= List of governors of Wisconsin =

Governor of Wisconsin
- Gubernatorial seal

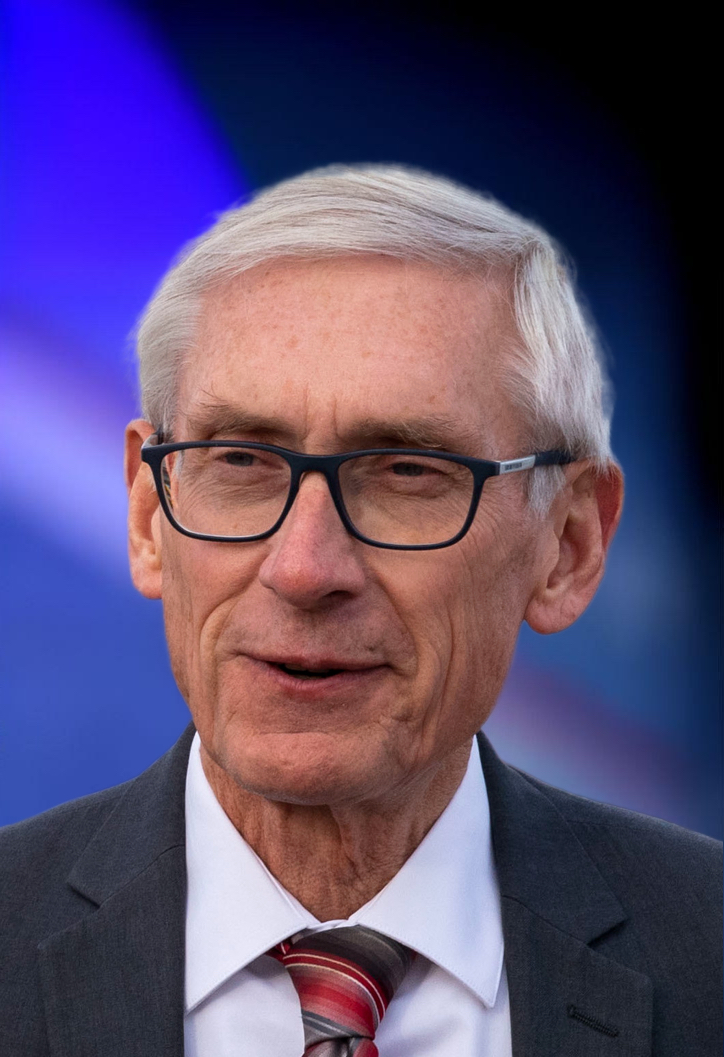
- Incumbent; Tony Evers since January 7, 2019
- Residence: Wisconsin Governor's Mansion
- Term length: Four years, no term limits
- Inaugural holder: Nelson Dewey
- Formation: June 7, 1848
- Succession: Line of succession
- Deputy: Lieutenant Governor of Wisconsin
- Salary: $152,756 (2022)
- Website: governor.wi.gov

The governor of Wisconsin is the head of government of Wisconsin and the commander-in-chief of the state's army and air forces. The governor has a duty to enforce state laws, and the power to either approve or veto bills passed by the Wisconsin State Legislature, to convene the legislature, and to grant pardons, except in cases of treason and impeachment.

Forty-four individuals have held the office of governor of Wisconsin since the state's admission to the Union in 1848, one of whom—Philip La Follette—served non-consecutive terms. Nelson Dewey, the first governor, took office on June 7, 1848. The longest-serving governor was Tommy Thompson, who took office on January 5, 1987, and resigned on February 1, 2001, a total of 14 years and 28 days. Arthur MacArthur Sr. had the shortest term: he was governor for a total of just 5 days—from March 21 to 25, 1856. The current governor is Tony Evers, a Democrat who took office on January 7, 2019.

== List of governors ==
Initially after the American Revolution, parts of the area now known as Wisconsin were claimed by Virginia, Massachusetts and Connecticut; however, Virginia ceded its claim in 1784, Massachusetts in 1785 and Connecticut in 1786. On July 13, 1787, the Northwest Territory, including the area now called Wisconsin, was formed; Wisconsin remained part of the territory until 1800. The territorial governor during this period was Arthur St. Clair. As parts of the Northwest Territory were admitted to the Union as states, Wisconsin became part of first the Indiana Territory (1800–1809), then the Illinois Territory (1809–1818), and then the Michigan Territory (1818–1836); see the lists of governors of Indiana, of Illinois, and of Michigan for these periods.

=== Wisconsin Territory ===
Wisconsin Territory was formed on July 3, 1836. During the time of its existence, the Wisconsin Territory had three people appointed governor by the President of the United States, one of whom served non-consecutive terms.

When most of Wisconsin Territory was admitted as the state of Wisconsin, the remainder became unorganized territory. However, the citizens of the region maintained a territorial government, and even elected a delegate to the United States House of Representatives, essentially making it a de facto continuation of Wisconsin Territory. As the region no longer had an official governor, Territorial Secretary John Catlin acted as governor of the region.

Governors of the Territory of Wisconsin
No.	Governor		Term in office (Note: The range given is from the date the governor was confirmed by the Senate, or appointed by the President during a Senate recess, to the date the governor's successor was confirmed, unless noted.)	Appointed by
1	Portrait of a well-dressed nineteenth-century man	Henry Dodge (1782–1867)	April 30, 1836 (Note: Dodge was nominated and confirmed by the Senate on April 30, 1836. He was reconfirmed by the Senate on March 2, 1839.) – September 13, 1841 (1963 days; replaced)	Andrew Jackson
1	Portrait of a well-dressed nineteenth-century man	Henry Dodge (1782–1867)	April 30, 1836 – September 13, 1841 (1963 days; replaced)	Martin Van Buren
2	Portrait of a well-dressed nineteenth-century man	James Duane Doty (1799–1865)	September 13, 1841 (Note: Doty was appointed on April 15, 1841, during a Senate recess; nominated on June 17; and confirmed by the Senate on September 13.) – June 15, 1844 (1007 days; replaced)	John Tyler
3	Portrait of a well-dressed nineteenth-century man	Nathaniel P. Tallmadge (1795–1864)	June 15, 1844 (Note: Tallmadge was nominated and confirmed by the Senate on June 15, 1844.) – April 8, 1845 (298 days; replaced)	John Tyler
4	Portrait of a well-dressed nineteenth-century man	Henry Dodge (1782–1867)	April 8, 1845 (Note: Dodge was appointed on April 8, 1845, during a Senate recess; nominated on December 23, 1846; and confirmed by the Senate on February 3.) – June 23, 1848 (1173 days; statehood)	James K. Polk

=== State of Wisconsin ===
Wisconsin was admitted to the Union on May 29, 1848. Since then, it has had 45 governors, one of whom served non-consecutive terms.

Originally, governors of Wisconsin served for two-year terms, but in 1967 the state constitution was amended to change this to four. Jeremiah M. Rusk served 1 3-year term in the 1880s as the constitution was amended during his first term to move elections from odd to even years, and all officers were allowed to serve an extra year, rather than have their terms cut a year short. Patrick Lucey, elected in the 1970 election, was the first governor to serve a 4-year term. Governors of Wisconsin are not term limited.

Lucius Fairchild, Jeremiah M. Rusk, Robert M. La Follette, Emanuel L. Philipp, John J. Blaine, Walter J. Kohler Jr., Warren P. Knowles and Tommy Thompson are one of eight Wisconsin governors to have served three terms. Thompson is the only person to have won four terms having been elected in 1986 and reelected in 1990, 1994 and again in 1998 before resigning in February 2001.

The state constitution provides for the election of a lieutenant governor; originally, the governor and lieutenant governor were elected on different tickets, and thus were not necessarily of the same party. Since the 1967 amendment, however, the two have been nominated, and voted on, together. Originally, if the office of the governor was vacant for any reason, "the powers and duties of the office . . . devolve[d] upon the lieutenant governor." In 1979, the constitution was amended to make this more specific: if the governor dies, resigns, or is removed from office, the lieutenant governor becomes governor, but becomes acting governor if the governor is absent from the state, impeached, or unable to carry out of duties. If any of these events occur while the office of lieutenant governor is vacant, the secretary of state becomes either governor or acting governor. Two Wisconsin governors have died while in office, one has died after being elected but before taking office, and four have resigned.

Governors of the State of Wisconsin
No.	Governor	Term in office	Party	Election	Lt. Governor (Note: Lieutenant governors represented the same party as their governor unless noted.)
1	Nelson Dewey (1813–1889)	June 7, 1848 – January 5, 1852 (1308 days; retired)	Democratic	1848	John Edwin Holmes
1	Nelson Dewey (1813–1889)	June 7, 1848 – January 5, 1852 (1308 days; retired)	Democratic	1849	Samuel Beall
2	Leonard J. Farwell (1819–1889)	January 5, 1852 – January 2, 1854 (729 days; retired) (Note: A convention of Free Soilers and others nominated Farwell, but he declined.)	Whig	1851	Timothy Burns (Note: Represented the Democratic Party) (died September 21, 1853)
2	Leonard J. Farwell (1819–1889)	January 5, 1852 – January 2, 1854 (729 days; retired)	Whig	1851	Vacant
3	William A. Barstow (1813–1865)	January 2, 1854 – March 21, 1856 (810 days; resigned) (Note: The 1855 election was very close, with Barstow initially named the winner by the Democratic state canvassing board, but irregularities were found and Republicans challenged it to the Supreme Court. Barstow resigned on March 21, before the Supreme Court could reach a decision. Lieutenant Governor MacArthur then acted as governor, though there was uncertainty as to the legitimacy of his position; this was complicated further when the Supreme Court ruled on March 25 that Bashford was the winner. Bashford arrived at the capitol and, due to fears of violence, MacArthur did not resist. The legislature recognized Bashford as governor on March 27.)	Democratic	1853	James T. Lewis (Note: Represented the Republican Party)
3	William A. Barstow (1813–1865)	January 2, 1854 – March 21, 1856 (810 days; resigned)	Democratic	1855	Arthur MacArthur Sr.
4	Arthur MacArthur Sr. (1815–1896)	March 21, 1856 – March 25, 1856 (5 days; removed)	Democratic	1855	Acting as governor
5	Coles Bashford (1816–1878)	March 25, 1856 – January 4, 1858 (651 days; retired)	Republican	1855	Arthur MacArthur Sr.
6	Alexander Randall (1819–1872)	January 4, 1858 – January 6, 1862 (1464 days; retired)	Republican	1857	Erasmus D. Campbell
6	Alexander Randall (1819–1872)	January 4, 1858 – January 6, 1862 (1464 days; retired)	Republican	1859	Butler Noble
7	Louis P. Harvey (1820–1862)	January 6, 1862 – April 19, 1862 (104 days; died in office)	Republican	1861	Edward Salomon
8	Edward Salomon (1828–1909)	April 19, 1862 – January 4, 1864 (626 days; lost nomination)	Republican	Succeeded from lieutenant governor	Vacant
9	James T. Lewis (1819–1904)	January 4, 1864 – January 1, 1866 (729 days; retired)	Republican	1863	Wyman Spooner
10	Lucius Fairchild (1831–1896)	January 1, 1866 – January 1, 1872 (2192 days; retired)	Republican	1865	Wyman Spooner
10	Lucius Fairchild (1831–1896)	January 1, 1866 – January 1, 1872 (2192 days; retired)	Republican	1867	Wyman Spooner
10	Lucius Fairchild (1831–1896)	January 1, 1866 – January 1, 1872 (2192 days; retired)	Republican	1869	Thaddeus C. Pound
11	Cadwallader C. Washburn (1818–1882)	January 1, 1872 – January 5, 1874 (736 days; lost election)	Republican	1871	Milton Pettit (died March 23, 1873)
11	Cadwallader C. Washburn (1818–1882)	January 1, 1872 – January 5, 1874 (736 days; lost election)	Republican	1871	Vacant
12	William Robert Taylor (1820–1909)	January 5, 1874 – January 3, 1876 (729 days; lost election)	Reform	1873	Charles D. Parker
13	Harrison Ludington (1812–1891)	January 3, 1876 – January 7, 1878 (736 days; retired)	Republican	1875	Charles D. Parker
14	William E. Smith (1824–1883)	January 7, 1878 – January 2, 1882 (1457 days; retired)	Republican	1877	James M. Bingham
14	William E. Smith (1824–1883)	January 7, 1878 – January 2, 1882 (1457 days; retired)	Republican	1879	James M. Bingham
15	Jeremiah M. Rusk (1830–1893)	January 2, 1882 – January 7, 1889 (2563 days; retired)	Republican	1881	Sam Fifield
15	Jeremiah M. Rusk (1830–1893)	January 2, 1882 – January 7, 1889 (2563 days; retired)	Republican	1884	Sam Fifield
15	Jeremiah M. Rusk (1830–1893)	January 2, 1882 – January 7, 1889 (2563 days; retired)	Republican	1886	George Washington Ryland
16	William D. Hoard (1836–1918)	January 7, 1889 – January 5, 1891 (729 days; lost election)	Republican	1888	George Washington Ryland
17	George Wilbur Peck (1840–1916)	January 5, 1891 – January 7, 1895 (1464 days; lost election)	Democratic	1890	Charles Jonas (resigned April 4, 1894)
17	George Wilbur Peck (1840–1916)	January 5, 1891 – January 7, 1895 (1464 days; lost election)	Democratic	1892	Charles Jonas (resigned April 4, 1894)
17	George Wilbur Peck (1840–1916)	January 5, 1891 – January 7, 1895 (1464 days; lost election)	Democratic	1892	Vacant
18	William H. Upham (1841–1924)	January 7, 1895 – January 4, 1897 (729 days; retired)	Republican	1894	Emil Baensch
19	Edward Scofield (1842–1925)	January 4, 1897 – January 7, 1901 (1464 days; retired)	Republican	1896	Emil Baensch
19	Edward Scofield (1842–1925)	January 4, 1897 – January 7, 1901 (1464 days; retired)	Republican	1898	Jesse Stone (died May 11, 1902)
20	Robert M. La Follette (1855–1925)	January 7, 1901 – January 1, 1906 (1821 days; resigned) (Note: La Follette resigned, having been elected to the United States Senate for a term beginning March 4, 1905; he delayed his resignation for nine months.)	Republican	1900	Jesse Stone (died May 11, 1902)
20	Robert M. La Follette (1855–1925)	January 7, 1901 – January 1, 1906 (1821 days; resigned)	Republican	1900	Vacant
20	Robert M. La Follette (1855–1925)	January 7, 1901 – January 1, 1906 (1821 days; resigned)	Republican	1902	James O. Davidson
20	Robert M. La Follette (1855–1925)	January 7, 1901 – January 1, 1906 (1821 days; resigned)	Republican	1904	James O. Davidson
21	James O. Davidson (1854–1922)	January 1, 1906 – January 2, 1911 (1828 days; retired)	Republican	Succeeded from lieutenant governor	Vacant
21	James O. Davidson (1854–1922)	January 1, 1906 – January 2, 1911 (1828 days; retired)	Republican	1906	William D. Connor
21	James O. Davidson (1854–1922)	January 1, 1906 – January 2, 1911 (1828 days; retired)	Republican	1908	John Strange
22	Francis E. McGovern (1866–1946)	January 2, 1911 – January 4, 1915 (1464 days; retired) (Note: McGovern instead ran unsuccessfully for the United States Senate.)	Republican	1910	Thomas Morris
22	Francis E. McGovern (1866–1946)	January 2, 1911 – January 4, 1915 (1464 days; retired)	Republican	1912	Thomas Morris
23	Emanuel L. Philipp (1861–1925)	January 4, 1915 – January 3, 1921 (2192 days; retired)	Republican	1914	Edward Dithmar
23	Emanuel L. Philipp (1861–1925)	January 4, 1915 – January 3, 1921 (2192 days; retired)	Republican	1916	Edward Dithmar
23	Emanuel L. Philipp (1861–1925)	January 4, 1915 – January 3, 1921 (2192 days; retired)	Republican	1918	Edward Dithmar
24	John J. Blaine (1875–1934)	January 3, 1921 – January 3, 1927 (2192 days; retired) (Note: Blaine was instead elected to the United States Senate.)	Republican	1920	George Comings
24	John J. Blaine (1875–1934)	January 3, 1921 – January 3, 1927 (2192 days; retired)	Republican	1922	George Comings
24	John J. Blaine (1875–1934)	January 3, 1921 – January 3, 1927 (2192 days; retired)	Republican	1924	Henry Huber
25	Fred R. Zimmerman (1880–1954)	January 3, 1927 – January 7, 1929 (736 days; lost nomination)	Republican	1926	Henry Huber
26	Walter J. Kohler Sr. (1875–1940)	January 7, 1929 – January 5, 1931 (729 days; lost nomination)	Republican	1928	Henry Huber
27	Philip La Follette (1897–1965)	January 5, 1931 – January 2, 1933 (729 days; lost nomination) (Note: La Follette lost the Republican nomination to Walter J. Kohler Sr.)	Republican	1930	Henry Huber
28	Albert G. Schmedeman (1864–1946)	January 2, 1933 – January 7, 1935 (736 days; lost election)	Democratic	1932	Thomas J. O'Malley (died May 27, 1936)
29	Philip La Follette (1897–1965)	January 7, 1935 – January 2, 1939 (1457 days; lost election)	Progressive	1934	Thomas J. O'Malley (died May 27, 1936)
29	Philip La Follette (1897–1965)	January 7, 1935 – January 2, 1939 (1457 days; lost election)	Progressive	1934	Vacant
29	Philip La Follette (1897–1965)	January 7, 1935 – January 2, 1939 (1457 days; lost election)	Progressive	1936	Henry Gunderson (resigned October 16, 1937)
29	Philip La Follette (1897–1965)	January 7, 1935 – January 2, 1939 (1457 days; lost election)	Progressive	1936	Vacant
29	Philip La Follette (1897–1965)	January 7, 1935 – January 2, 1939 (1457 days; lost election)	Progressive	1936	Herman Ekern (appointed May 16, 1938)
30	Julius P. Heil (1876–1949)	January 2, 1939 – January 4, 1943 (1464 days; lost election)	Republican	1938	Walter Samuel Goodland
30	Julius P. Heil (1876–1949)	January 2, 1939 – January 4, 1943 (1464 days; lost election)	Republican	1940	Walter Samuel Goodland
—	Orland Steen Loomis (1893–1942)	Died before taking office	Progressive	1942 (Note: Loomis was elected in the 1942 election, but died before taking office. Per a ruling of the Wisconsin Supreme Court, Goodland, who had been reelected lieutenant governor in the same election, served as governor for the term.)	Walter Samuel Goodland
31	Walter Samuel Goodland (1862–1947)	January 4, 1943 – March 12, 1947 (1529 days; died in office)	Republican	Succeeded from lieutenant governor	Vacant
31	Walter Samuel Goodland (1862–1947)	January 4, 1943 – March 12, 1947 (1529 days; died in office)	Republican	1944	Oscar Rennebohm
31	Walter Samuel Goodland (1862–1947)	January 4, 1943 – March 12, 1947 (1529 days; died in office)	Republican	1946	Oscar Rennebohm
32	Oscar Rennebohm (1889–1968)	March 12, 1947 – January 1, 1951 (1392 days; retired)	Republican	Succeeded from lieutenant governor	Vacant
32	Oscar Rennebohm (1889–1968)	March 12, 1947 – January 1, 1951 (1392 days; retired)	Republican	1948	George M. Smith
33	Walter J. Kohler Jr. (1904–1976)	January 1, 1951 – January 7, 1957 (2199 days; retired)	Republican	1950	George M. Smith
33	Walter J. Kohler Jr. (1904–1976)	January 1, 1951 – January 7, 1957 (2199 days; retired)	Republican	1952	George M. Smith
33	Walter J. Kohler Jr. (1904–1976)	January 1, 1951 – January 7, 1957 (2199 days; retired)	Republican	1954	Warren P. Knowles
34	Vernon W. Thomson (1905–1988)	January 7, 1957 – January 5, 1959 (729 days; lost election)	Republican	1956	Warren P. Knowles
35	Gaylord Nelson (1916–2005)	January 5, 1959 – January 7, 1963 (1464 days; retired) (Note: Nelson was instead elected to the United States Senate.)	Democratic	1958	Philleo Nash
35	Gaylord Nelson (1916–2005)	January 5, 1959 – January 7, 1963 (1464 days; retired)	Democratic	1960	Warren P. Knowles
36	John W. Reynolds Jr. (1921–2002)	January 7, 1963 – January 4, 1965 (729 days; lost election)	Democratic	1962	Jack B. Olson
37	Warren P. Knowles (1908–1993)	January 4, 1965 – January 4, 1971 (2192 days; retired)	Republican	1964	Patrick Lucey
37	Warren P. Knowles (1908–1993)	January 4, 1965 – January 4, 1971 (2192 days; retired)	Republican	1966	Jack B. Olson
37	Warren P. Knowles (1908–1993)	January 4, 1965 – January 4, 1971 (2192 days; retired)	Republican	1968	Jack B. Olson
38	Patrick Lucey (1918–2014)	January 4, 1971 – July 6, 1977 (2376 days; resigned) (Note: Lucey resigned, having been confirmed as United States Ambassador to Mexico.)	Democratic	1970	Martin J. Schreiber
38	Patrick Lucey (1918–2014)	January 4, 1971 – July 6, 1977 (2376 days; resigned)	Democratic	1974	Martin J. Schreiber
39	Martin J. Schreiber (b. 1939)	July 6, 1977 – January 3, 1979 (lost election)	Democratic	Succeeded from lieutenant governor	Vacant
40	Lee S. Dreyfus (1926–2008)	January 3, 1979 – January 3, 1983 (1462 days; retired)	Republican	1978	Russell Olson
41	Tony Earl (1936–2023)	January 3, 1983 – January 5, 1987 (1464 days; lost election)	Democratic	1982	James Flynn
42	Tommy Thompson (b. 1941)	January 5, 1987 – February 1, 2001 (5142 days; resigned) (Note: Thompson resigned, having been confirmed as United States Secretary of Health and Human Services.)	Republican	1986	Scott McCallum
42	Tommy Thompson (b. 1941)	January 5, 1987 – February 1, 2001 (5142 days; resigned)	Republican	1990	Scott McCallum
42	Tommy Thompson (b. 1941)	January 5, 1987 – February 1, 2001 (5142 days; resigned)	Republican	1994	Scott McCallum
42	Tommy Thompson (b. 1941)	January 5, 1987 – February 1, 2001 (5142 days; resigned)	Republican	1998	Scott McCallum
43	Scott McCallum (b. 1950)	February 1, 2001 – January 6, 2003 (705 days; lost election)	Republican	Succeeded from lieutenant governor	Vacant
43	Scott McCallum (b. 1950)	February 1, 2001 – January 6, 2003 (705 days; lost election)	Republican	Succeeded from lieutenant governor	Margaret Farrow (appointed May 9, 2001)
44	Jim Doyle (b. 1945)	January 6, 2003 – January 3, 2011 (2920 days; retired)	Democratic	2002	Barbara Lawton
44	Jim Doyle (b. 1945)	January 6, 2003 – January 3, 2011 (2920 days; retired)	Democratic	2006	Barbara Lawton
45	Scott Walker (b. 1967)	January 3, 2011 – January 7, 2019 (2927 days; lost election)	Republican	2010	Rebecca Kleefisch
45	Scott Walker (b. 1967)	January 3, 2011 – January 7, 2019 (2927 days; lost election)	Republican	2012 (recall)	Rebecca Kleefisch
45	Scott Walker (b. 1967)	January 3, 2011 – January 7, 2019 (2927 days; lost election)	Republican	2014	Rebecca Kleefisch
46	Tony Evers (b. 1951)	January 7, 2019 – Incumbent (Note: Evers' second term began on January 3, 2023, and will expire on January 4, 2027; he did not seek a third term.) (in office 2877 days)	Democratic	2018	Mandela Barnes
46	Tony Evers (b. 1951)	January 7, 2019 – Incumbent (in office 2877 days)	Democratic	2022	Sara Rodriguez
47	David Crowley (b. 1986)	Governor-elect takes office January 4, 2027	Democratic	2026	Sarah Godlewski

== See also ==
- Gubernatorial lines of succession in the United States § Wisconsin
- First ladies of Wisconsin
- Lieutenant Governor of Wisconsin
- List of Wisconsin state legislatures

== Sources ==
- "Former Wisconsin Governors". National Governors Association.
- "Wisconsin Constitution". State Democracy Research Initiative. University of Wisconsin Law School.
- Dubin, Michael J. (2003). United States Gubernatorial Elections, 1776–1860: The Official Results by State and County. McFarland. ISBN 0-7864-1439-1 – via Internet Archive.
- Glashan, Roy R. (1979). American Governors and Gubernatorial Elections, 1775-1978. Meckler Books. ISBN 0-7201-1511-6 – via Internet Archive.
- Kallenbach, Joseph E.; Kallenbach, Jessamine S. (1977). American State Governors, 1776-1976. Oceana Publications. ISBN 978-0-379-00665-0 – via Internet Archive.
- McMullin, Thomas A.; Walker, David (1984). Biographical Directory of American Territorial Governors. Meckler Publishing. ISBN 0-930466-11-X – via Internet Archive.
- Mullaney, Marie Marmo (1994). Biographical Directory of the Governors of the United States, 1988–1994. Greenwood Publishing Group. ISBN 0-313-28312-5 – via Internet Archive.
- Sobel, Robert; Raimo, John (1978). Biographical Directory of the Governors of the United States, 1789-1978. Vol. 4. Meckler Books. ISBN 0-930466-01-2 – via Internet Archive.
- Thorpe, Francis Newton, ed. (1909). The Federal and State Constitutions, Colonial Charters, and Other Organic Laws of the States, Territories, and Colonies Now or Heretofore Forming the United States of America. Vol. 7. United States Government Publishing Office – via Internet Archive.
