= 1957 United States Senate special election in Wisconsin =

- August 27, 1957
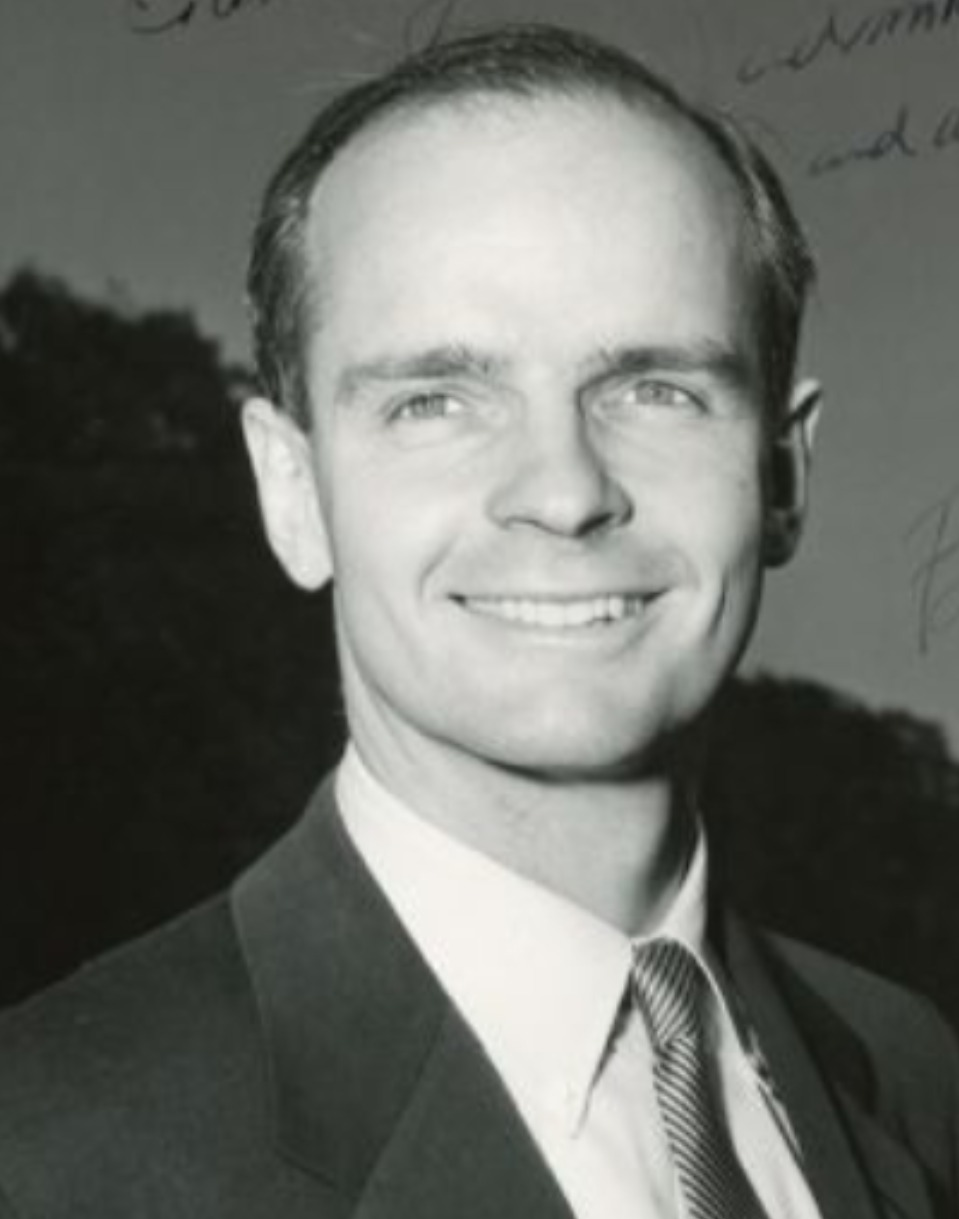

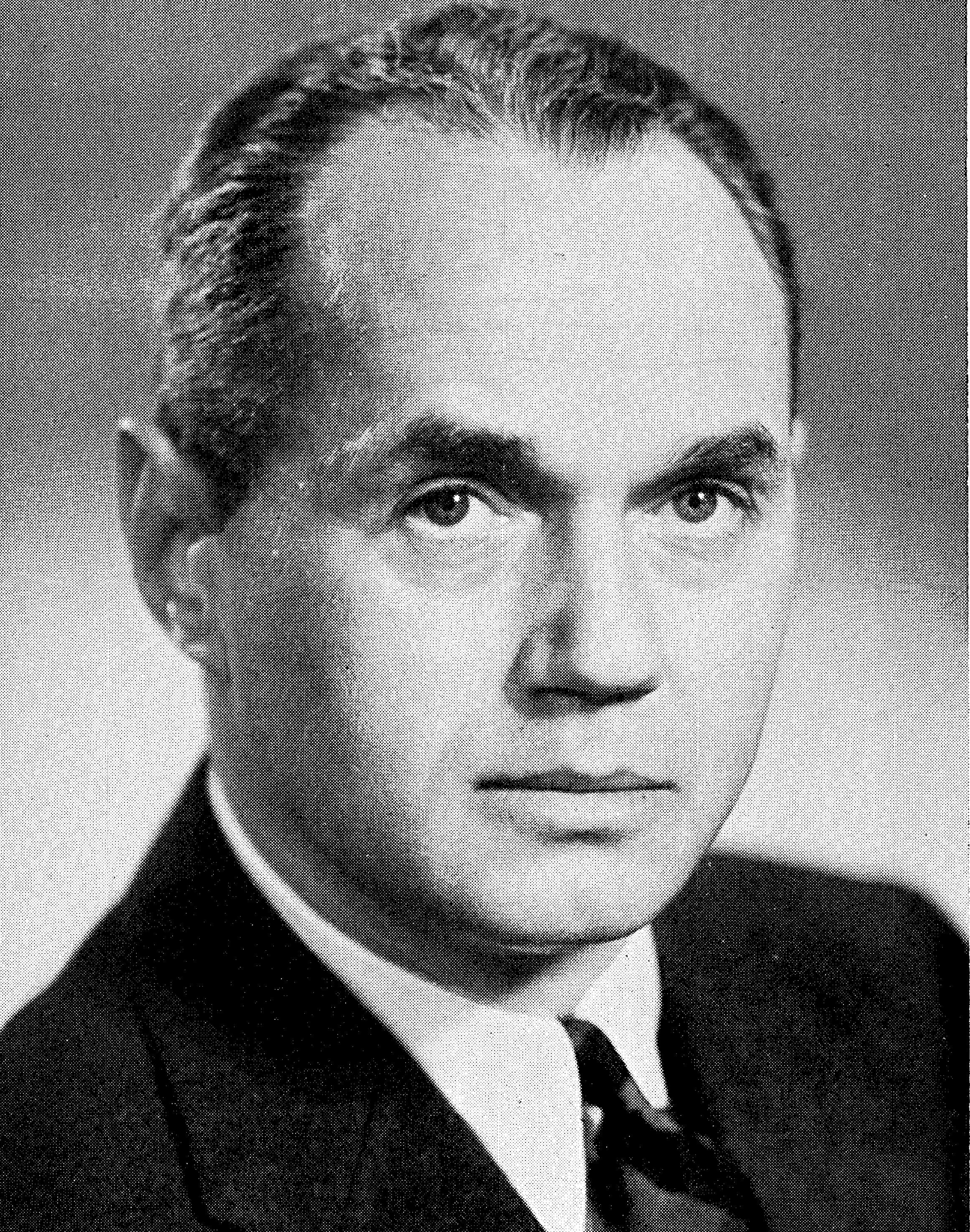
Nominee	William Proxmire	Walter J. Kohler Jr.
Party	Democratic	Republican
Popular vote	435,985	312,931
Percentage	56.43%	40.50%
- County results Proxmire: 40–50% 50–60% 60–70% 70–80% Kohler: 40–50% 50–60%
U.S. senator before election
Joseph McCarthy
Republican
Elected U.S. Senator
William Proxmire
Democratic

The 1957 United States Senate special election in Wisconsin took place on August 27, 1957, to elect a U.S. Senator to complete the unexpired term of Senator Joseph McCarthy, who died on May 2, 1957.

Unlike most states Wisconsin law did not allow for the gubernatorial appointment of an interim Senator.

Democratic nominee William Proxmire defeated Republican nominee and former Governor Walter J. Kohler Jr.

== Primary elections ==
Primary elections were held on July 30, 1957.

=== Democratic primary ===
==== Candidates ====
- William Proxmire, former State Representative, Democratic nominee for Governor in 1952, 1954 and 1956
- Clement J. Zablocki, incumbent U.S. Representative

==== Declined ====
- Henry S. Reuss, incumbent U.S. Representative

==== Results ====
Democratic primary results
Party	Candidate	Votes	%
Democratic	William Proxmire	86,341	60.29
Democratic	Clement J. Zablocki	56,817	39.67
Scattering		62	0.04
Total votes		143,220	100.00

=== Republican primary ===
==== Candidates ====
- Glenn Robert Davis, former U.S. Representative, unsuccessful candidate for Republican nomination for U.S. Senate in 1956
- Henry P. Hughes, former justice of the Wisconsin Supreme Court
- Warren P. Knowles, incumbent Lieutenant Governor of Wisconsin
- Walter J. Kohler Jr., former Governor of Wisconsin
- Gerald D. Lorge, incumbent State Senator
- Alvin E. O'Konski, incumbent U.S. Representative
- John C. Schafer, former U.S. Representative

==== Declined ====
- Howard H. Boyle, attorney, unsuccessful candidate for Republican nomination for U.S. Senate in 1956

==== Results ====
Republican primary results
Party	Candidate	Votes	%
Republican	Walter J. Kohler Jr.	109,256	34.43
Republican	Glenn Robert Davis	100,532	31.68
Republican	Alvin E. O'Konski	66,784	21.05
Republican	Warren P. Knowles	23,996	7.56
Republican	Henry P. Hughes	7,488	2.36
Republican	Gerald D. Lorge	7,326	2.31
Republican	John C. Schafer	1,906	0.60
Write-in		44	0.01
Total votes		317,332	100.00

== General election ==
=== Major party candidates ===
- Walter J. Kohler Jr., Republican
- William Proxmire, Democratic

=== Minor party candidates ===
- Howard H. Boyle, "Joe McCarthy Republican", attorney
- Georgia Cozzini, Socialist Labor, housewife
- Douglas J. Wheaton, steamfitter

The three minor candidates all technically ran as independents.

=== Results ===
1957 United States Senate special election in Wisconsin
Party	Candidate	Votes	%
Democratic	William Proxmire	435,985	56.43
Republican	Walter J. Kohler Jr.	312,931	40.50
Protection of Constitutional Government	Howard H. Boyle	20,581	2.66
Christianity - America First - McCarthyism	Douglas J. Wheaton	2,288	0.30
Socialist Labor	Georgia Cozzini	704	0.09
Scattering		131	0.02
Majority		123,054	15.93
Turnout		772,620	100.00
Democratic gain from Republican			

== See also ==
- 1957 United States Senate elections

== Bibliography ==
- Congressional Elections, 1946-1996. Washington, D.C.: Congressional Quarterly Inc. 1998. ISBN 1-56802-248-4.
- Scammon, Richard M., ed. (1958). America Votes: a handbook of contemporary American election statistics, 1956-57. New York: Governmental Affairs Institute.
- Toepel, M. G.; Kuehn, Hazel L. (eds.). The Wisconsin Blue Book, 1958. State of Wisconsin.
