= 1956 Wisconsin gubernatorial election =

- November 6, 1956
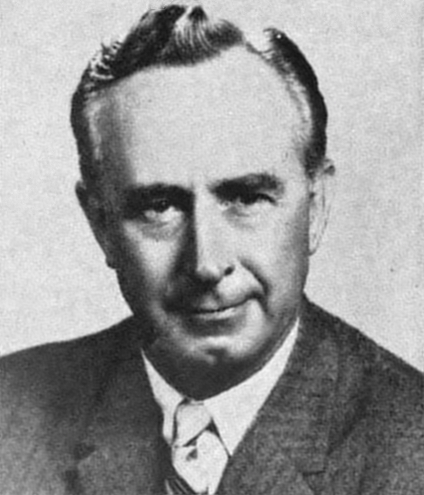

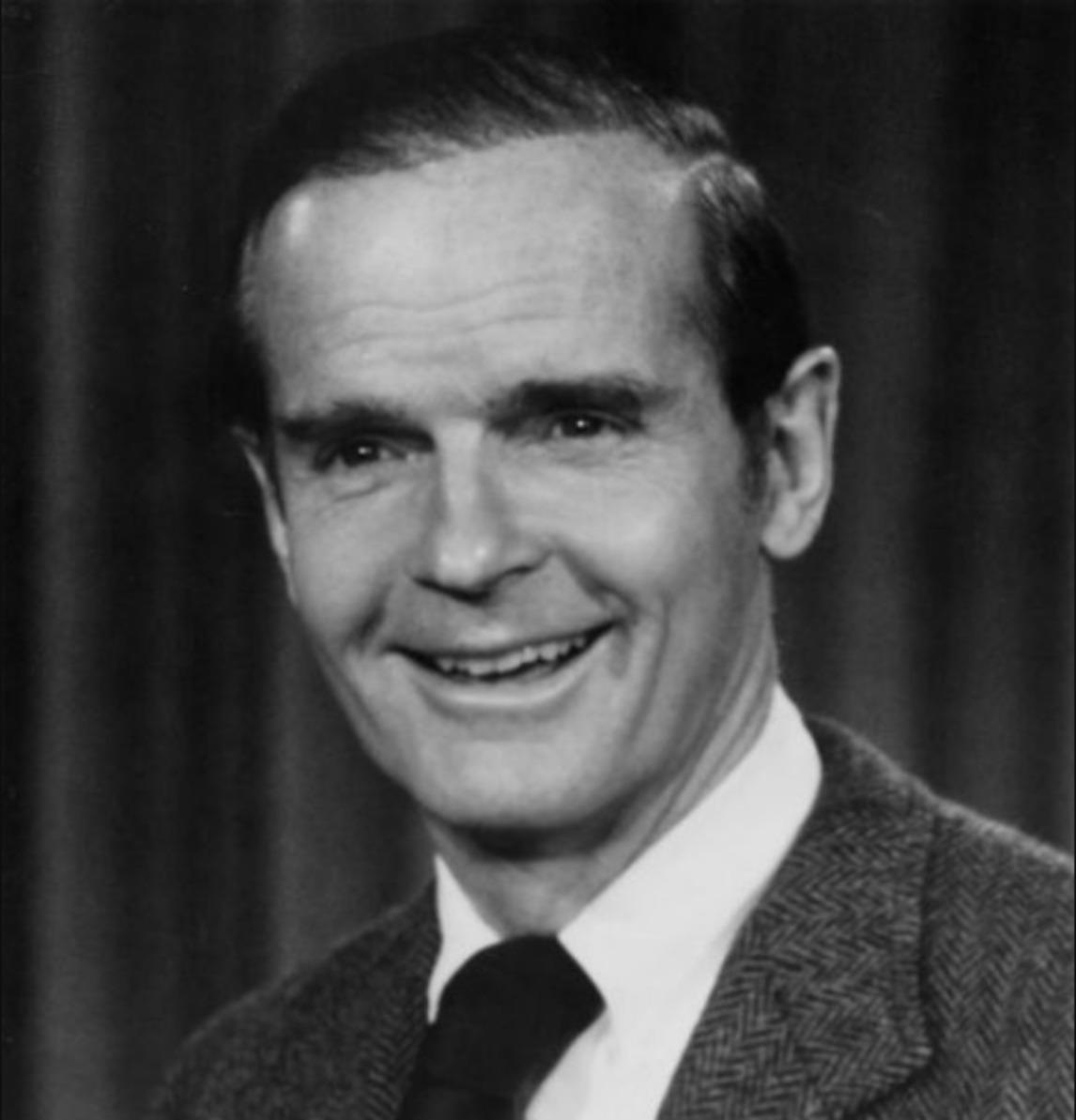
Nominee	Vernon W. Thomson	William Proxmire
Party	Republican	Democratic
Popular vote	808,273	749,421
Percentage	51.89%	48.11%
- County results Thomson: 50–60% 60–70% 70–80% Proxmire: 50–60% 60–70%
Governor before election
Walter J. Kohler Jr.
Republican
Elected Governor
Vernon Wallace Thomson
Republican

The 1956 Wisconsin gubernatorial election was held on November 6, 1956. Republican nominee Vernon W. Thomson defeated Democratic nominee William Proxmire with 51.89% of the vote. Proxmire was defeated for the third consecutive gubernatorial election; he would subsequently win a special election for the United States Senate the following year after the death of Joseph McCarthy.

== Primary election ==
The primary election was held on September 11, 1956. Both major party candidates were unopposed in their respective primaries.

=== Republican party ===
==== Candidates ====
- Vernon W. Thomson, Attorney General of Wisconsin since 1951.

==== Results ====
Republican primary results
Party	Candidate	Votes	%
Republican	Vernon W. Thomson	400,442	100.00%
Total votes		400,442	100.00%

=== Democratic party ===
==== Candidates ====
- William Proxmire, member of the Wisconsin State Assembly 1951–53 and Democratic nominee for Governor in 1952 and 1954

==== Results ====
Democratic primary results
Party	Candidate	Votes	%
Democratic	William Proxmire	265,475	100.00%
Total votes		265,475	100.00%

== General election ==
=== Candidates ===
- William Proxmire, Democrat
- Vernon W. Thomson, Republican

=== Results ===
1956 Wisconsin gubernatorial election
Party	Candidate	Votes	%	±%
Republican	Vernon W. Thomson	808,273	51.89%	+0.43%
Democratic	William Proxmire	749,421	48.11%	−0.29%
	Scattering (Note: These are not listed in the Blue Book but are listed in the Board of Canvassers report.)	94	0.01%	
Majority		58,852	3.78%	
Total votes		1,557,788	100.00%	
Republican hold		Swing	+0.72%	

=== Results by county ===
After this election, Taylor County would not vote Republican again until 1978.

County	Vernon W. Thomson Republican		William Proxmire Democratic		Scattering Write-in		Margin		Total votes cast
County	#	%	#	%	#	%	#	%	Total votes cast
Adams	1,652	52.98%	1,466	47.02%	0	0.00%	186	5.97%	3,118
Ashland	3,584	46.55%	4,115	53.45%	0	0.00%	-531	-6.90%	7,699
Barron	7,584	54.38%	6,362	45.62%	0	0.00%	1,222	8.76%	13,946
Bayfield	2,730	48.38%	2,913	51.62%	0	0.00%	-183	-3.24%	5,643
Brown	26,181	56.45%	20,192	43.54%	2	0.00%	5,989	12.91%	46,375
Buffalo	3,030	55.20%	2,459	44.80%	0	0.00%	571	10.40%	5,489
Burnett	2,109	51.70%	1,970	48.30%	0	0.00%	139	3.41%	4,079
Calumet	5,370	64.88%	2,905	35.10%	2	0.02%	2,465	29.78%	8,277
Chippewa	8,228	49.95%	8,246	50.05%	0	0.00%	-18	-0.11%	16,474
Clark	6,926	54.06%	5,886	45.94%	0	0.00%	1,040	8.12%	12,812
Columbia	9,265	59.74%	6,243	40.26%	0	0.00%	3,022	19.49%	15,508
Crawford	3,593	53.70%	3,098	46.30%	0	0.00%	495	7.40%	6,691
Dane	34,496	43.47%	44,851	56.52%	9	0.01%	-10,355	-13.05%	79,356
Dodge	15,244	61.23%	9,652	38.77%	0	0.00%	5,592	22.46%	24,896
Door	5,929	69.50%	2,602	30.50%	0	0.00%	3,327	39.00%	8,531
Douglas	8,283	41.16%	11,841	58.84%	1	0.00%	-3,558	-17.68%	20,125
Dunn	5,838	55.80%	4,624	44.20%	0	0.00%	1,214	11.60%	10,462
Eau Claire	11,631	50.32%	11,485	49.68%	0	0.00%	146	0.63%	23,116
Florence	841	50.06%	839	49.94%	0	0.00%	2	0.12%	1,680
Fond du Lac	18,424	61.19%	11,685	38.81%	1	0.00%	6,739	22.38%	30,110
Forest	1,502	42.26%	2,052	57.74%	0	0.00%	-550	-15.48%	3,554
Grant	10,929	65.72%	5,699	34.27%	1	0.01%	5,230	31.45%	16,629
Green	6,090	56.97%	4,599	43.03%	0	0.00%	1,491	13.95%	10,689
Green Lake	4,944	69.90%	2,128	30.09%	1	0.01%	2,816	39.81%	7,073
Iowa	4,762	56.99%	3,594	43.01%	0	0.00%	1,168	13.98%	8,356
Iron	1,367	34.57%	2,587	65.43%	0	0.00%	-1,220	-30.85%	3,954
Jackson	3,033	48.47%	3,224	51.52%	1	0.02%	-191	-3.05%	6,258
Jefferson	11,511	57.26%	8,591	42.73%	1	0.00%	2,920	14.53%	20,103
Juneau	4,660	62.16%	2,837	37.84%	0	0.00%	1,823	24.32%	7,497
Kenosha	16,273	41.98%	22,494	58.02%	1	0.00%	-6,221	-16.05%	38,768
Kewaunee	4,127	55.78%	3,272	44.22%	0	0.00%	855	11.56%	7,399
La Crosse	15,498	51.79%	14,427	48.21%	0	0.00%	1,071	3.58%	29,925
Lafayette	4,381	55.10%	3,570	44.90%	0	0.00%	811	10.20%	7,951
Langlade	4,261	54.64%	3,537	45.36%	0	0.00%	724	9.28%	7,798
Lincoln	5,664	60.42%	3,711	39.58%	0	0.00%	1,953	20.83%	9,375
Manitowoc	14,224	48.64%	15,017	51.35%	1	0.00%	-793	-2.71%	29,242
Marathon	17,802	46.42%	20,545	53.58%	0	0.00%	-2,743	-7.15%	38,347
Marinette	8,054	56.54%	6,190	43.46%	0	0.00%	1,864	13.09%	14,244
Marquette	2,528	66.65%	1,264	33.32%	1	0.03%	1,264	33.32%	3,793
Milwaukee	180,462	44.02%	229,443	55.97%	27	0.01%	-48,981	-11.95%	409,932
Monroe	6,712	56.99%	5,065	43.00%	1	0.01%	1,647	13.98%	11,778
Oconto	6,109	58.61%	4,314	41.39%	0	0.00%	1,795	17.22%	10,423
Oneida	5,177	53.68%	4,467	46.31%	1	0.01%	710	7.36%	9,645
Outagamie	23,037	66.33%	11,694	33.67%	0	0.00%	11,343	32.66%	34,731
Ozaukee	8,066	57.90%	5,864	42.10%	0	0.00%	2,202	15.81%	13,930
Pepin	1,689	58.54%	1,196	41.46%	0	0.00%	493	17.09%	2,885
Pierce	5,343	57.78%	3,904	42.22%	0	0.00%	1,439	15.56%	9,247
Polk	5,279	49.64%	5,356	50.36%	0	0.00%	-77	-0.72%	10,635
Portage	6,357	41.42%	8,991	58.58%	1	0.01%	-2,634	-17.16%	15,349
Price	3,430	51.37%	3,247	48.63%	0	0.00%	183	2.74%	6,677
Racine	25,987	46.85%	29,453	53.10%	26	0.05%	-3,466	-6.25%	55,466
Richland	4,747	59.72%	3,200	40.26%	2	0.03%	1,547	19.46%	7,949
Rock	25,495	59.25%	17,531	40.75%	0	0.00%	7,964	18.51%	43,026
Rusk	3,112	49.19%	3,215	50.81%	0	0.00%	-103	-1.63%	6,327
Sauk	9,715	60.12%	6,443	39.87%	1	0.01%	3,272	20.25%	16,159
Sawyer	2,474	58.09%	1,785	41.91%	0	0.00%	689	16.18%	4,259
Shawano	8,698	65.95%	4,489	34.04%	1	0.01%	4,209	31.92%	13,188
Sheboygan	20,359	52.97%	18,078	47.03%	0	0.00%	2,281	5.93%	38,437
St. Croix	6,256	51.72%	5,840	48.28%	0	0.00%	416	3.44%	12,096
Taylor	3,388	51.07%	3,245	48.91%	1	0.02%	143	2.16%	6,634
Trempealeau	4,766	48.66%	5,029	51.34%	0	0.00%	-263	-2.69%	9,795
Vernon	5,438	48.45%	5,787	51.55%	0	0.00%	-349	-3.11%	11,225
Vilas	3,109	53.50%	1,787	36.50%	0	0.00%	1,322	27.00%	4,896
Walworth	14,895	69.01%	6,688	30.98%	2	0.01%	8,207	38.02%	21,585
Washburn	2,573	55.14%	2,093	44.86%	0	0.00%	480	10.29%	4,666
Washington	10,004	60.09%	6,645	39.91%	0	0.00%	3,359	20.18%	16,649
Waukesha	29,573	57.94%	21,465	42.05%	6	0.01%	8,108	15.88%	51,044
Waupaca	11,060	73.08%	4,074	26.92%	0	0.00%	6,986	46.16%	15,134
Waushara	4,377	71.19%	1,771	28.81%	0	0.00%	2,606	42.39%	6,148
Winnebago	25,638	62.93%	15,101	37.06%	3	0.01%	10,537	25.86%	40,742
Wood	12,400	56.91%	9,389	43.09%	0	0.00%	3,011	13.82%	21,789
Total	808,273	51.89%	749,421	48.11%	94	0.01%	58,852	3.78%	1,557,788

==== Counties that flipped from Democratic to Republican ====
- Eau Claire
- Florence
- Langlade
- Price
- Taylor

==== Counties that flipped from Republican to Democratic ====
- Polk
