= Vernon W. Thomson =

American politician (1905–1988)

Vernon Thomson
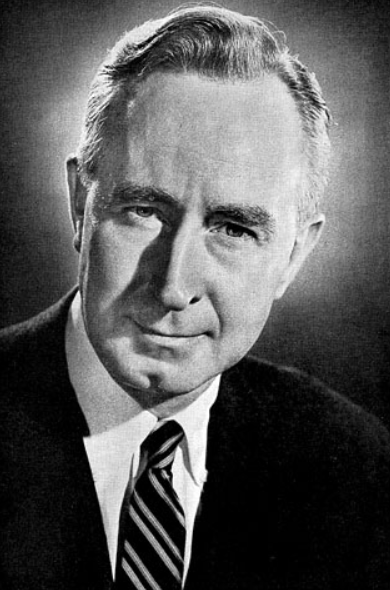
- Thomson as governor, c. 1957

Member of the U.S. House of Representatives from Wisconsin's 3rd district
- In office January 3, 1961 – December 31, 1974
- Preceded by: Gardner R. Withrow
- Succeeded by: Alvin Baldus

34th Governor of Wisconsin
- In office January 7, 1957 – January 5, 1959
- Lieutenant: Warren P. Knowles
- Preceded by: Walter J. Kohler Jr.
- Succeeded by: Gaylord Nelson

32nd Attorney General of Wisconsin
- In office January 1, 1951 – January 7, 1957
- Governor: Walter J. Kohler, Jr.
- Preceded by: Thomas E. Fairchild
- Succeeded by: Stewart G. Honeck

56th Speaker of the Wisconsin State Assembly
- In office January 2, 1939 – January 1, 1945
- Preceded by: Paul Alfonsi
- Succeeded by: Donald C. McDowell

Majority Leader of the Wisconsin State Assembly
- In office January 1, 1945 – January 1, 1951
- Preceded by: Mark Catlin Jr.
- Succeeded by: Arthur O. Mockrud

Member of the Wisconsin State Assembly from the Richland County district
- In office January 7, 1935 – January 1, 1951
- Preceded by: Harley A. Martin
- Succeeded by: Milford C. Kintz

Personal details
- Born: November 5, 1905 Richland Center, Wisconsin, U.S.
- Died: April 2, 1988 (aged 82) Washington, D.C., U.S.
- Resting place: Richland Center Cemetery, Richland Center, Wisconsin
- Party: Republican
- Spouse: Helen Alice Davis (m. 1936; died 1973)
- Profession: Lawyer

Vernon Wallace Thomson (November 5, 1905 – April 2, 1988) was an American lawyer and Republican politician from Richland County, Wisconsin. He served seven terms in the U.S. House of Representatives, representing Wisconsin's 3rd congressional district from 1961 through 1974. Before his election to Congress, he served as the 34th governor of Wisconsin (1957–1959), 32nd attorney general of Wisconsin (1951–1957), and 56th speaker of the Wisconsin State Assembly (1939–1945). He was also mayor of Richland Center, Wisconsin

== Early life and education ==
Vernon Thomson was born in Richland Center, Wisconsin. He attended what is now Carroll University, in 1925, but graduated from what is now the University of Wisconsin–Madison, in 1927, where he was a member of Chi Phi fraternity. In 1932, he received his law degree and practiced law.

== Career ==
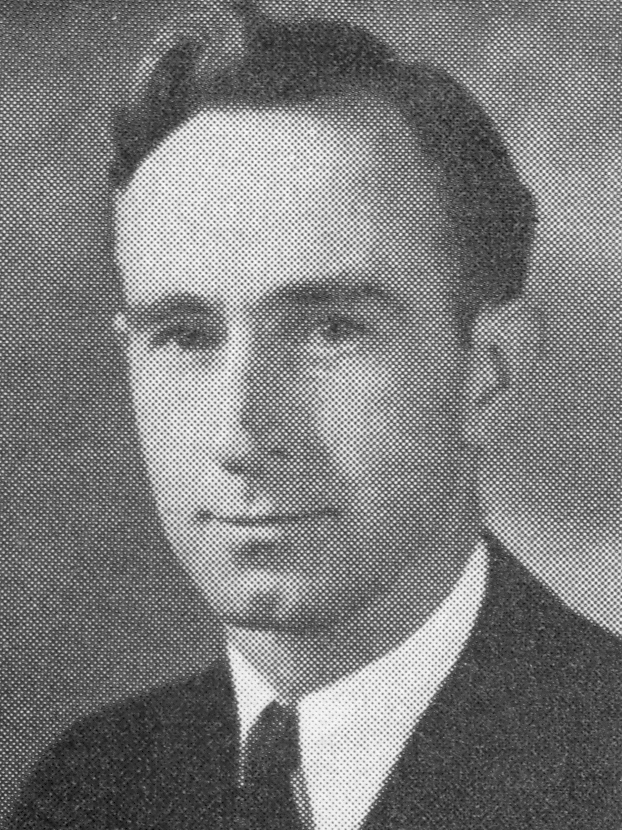
Thompson as a Speaker of the State Assembly, c. 1940

Thomson became involved in the Republican Party. He was mayor of Richland Center from 1944 to 1951 and a member of the Wisconsin State Assembly from 1935 to 1951, and served as Speaker of the Assembly from 1939 to 1945. He served as Attorney General of Wisconsin from 1951 to 1957. In 1956, he was elected governor of Wisconsin, defeating William Proxmire; he was defeated for reelection as governor in 1958 by Gaylord Nelson.

In 1960, he was elected to the United States House of Representatives representing Wisconsin's 3rd congressional district. He served in the 87th and was reelected to the six succeeding congresses. Thomson voted in favor of the Civil Rights Act of 1964. He was defeated for reelection in 1974, losing to Alvin Baldus. He resigned before the official end of his term, overall serving from January 3, 1961 till December 31, 1974. Thomson was a member of the Federal Election Commission.

Thomson died in Washington, D.C., and was buried in Richland Center, Wisconsin.

Party political offices
Preceded by Donald J. Martin	Republican nominee for Attorney General of Wisconsin; 1950, 1952, 1954	Succeeded by Stewart G. Honeck
Preceded by Walter J. Kohler Jr.	Republican nominee for Governor of Wisconsin; 1956, 1958	Succeeded by Philip Kuehn
Legal offices
Preceded by Thomas E. Fairchild	Attorney General of Wisconsin; 1951–1957	Succeeded by Stewart G. Honeck
Political offices
Preceded by Walter J. Kohler Jr.	Governor of Wisconsin; 1957–1959	Succeeded by Gaylord Nelson
U.S. House of Representatives
Preceded by Gardner R. Withrow	Member of the U.S. House of Representatives from Wisconsin's 3rd congressional district January 3, 1961 – December 31, 1974	Succeeded by Alvin Baldus
