= 1950 Wisconsin gubernatorial election =

- November 7, 1950
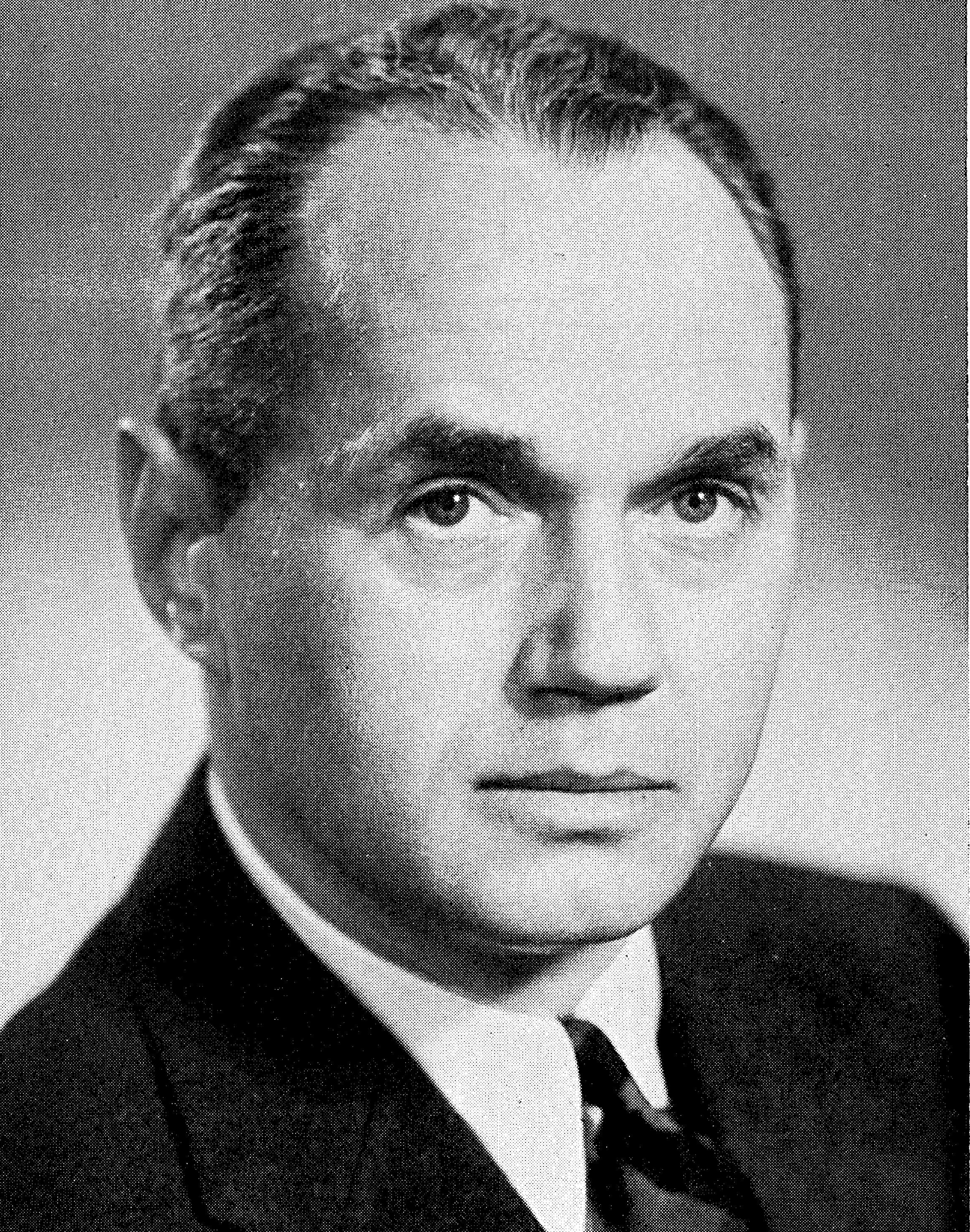

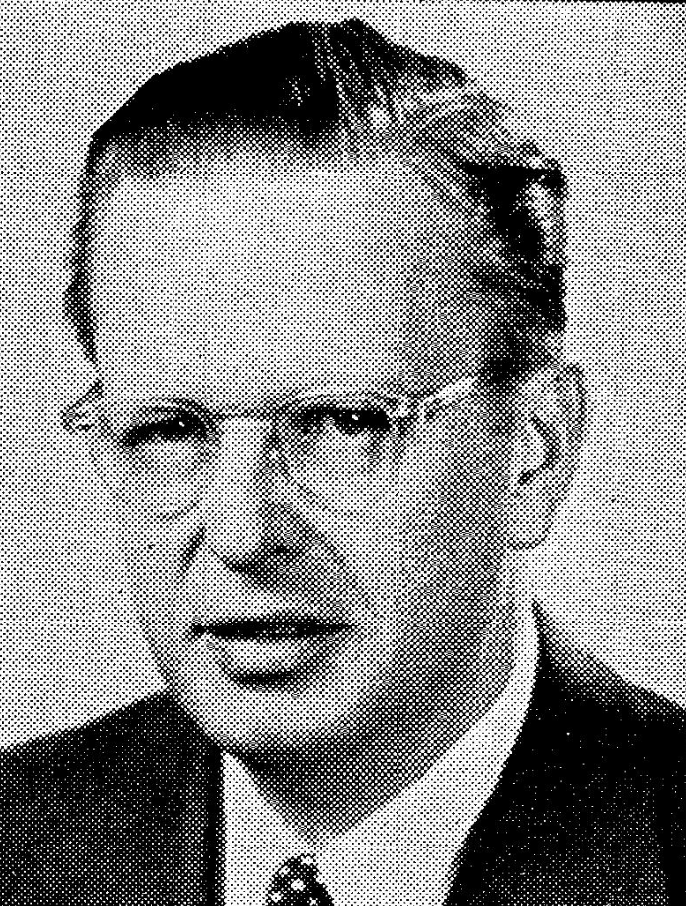
Nominee	Walter J. Kohler Jr.	Carl W. Thompson
Party	Republican	Democratic
Popular vote	605,649	525,319
Percentage	53.21%	46.16%
- County results Kohler: 50–60% 60–70% 70–80% Thompson: 50–60%
Governor before election
Oscar Rennebohm
Republican
Elected Governor
Walter J. Kohler Jr.
Republican

The 1950 Wisconsin gubernatorial election was held on November 7, 1950.

Incumbent Republican Governor Oscar Rennebohm did not seek a third term.

Republican nominee Walter J. Kohler Jr. defeated Democratic nominee Carl W. Thompson with 53.21% of the vote.

== Primary election ==
Primary elections were held on September 19, 1950.

=== Republican party ===
==== Candidates ====
- Walter J. Kohler Jr., businessman
- Leonard Schmitt, lawyer

==== Results ====
Republican primary results
Party	Candidate	Votes	%
Republican	Walter J. Kohler Jr.	272,139	64.42%
Republican	Leonard Schmitt	150,315	35.58%
Total votes		422,454	100.00%

=== Democratic party ===
==== Candidates ====
- Charles P. Greene, former member of the Wisconsin State Assembly
- Carl W. Thompson, Democratic candidate for Governor in 1948

==== Results ====
Democratic primary results
Party	Candidate	Votes	%
Democratic	Carl W. Thompson	130,745	78.05%
Democratic	Charles P. Greene	36,777	21.95%
Total votes		167,522	100.00%

=== People's Progressive party ===
==== Candidates ====
- M. Michael Essin, candidate for Attorney General in 1948

==== Results ====
People's Progressive primary results
Party	Candidate	Votes	%
Progressive	M. Michael Essin	1,105	100.00%
Total votes		1,105	100.00%

=== Social-Democratic party ===
==== Candidates ====
- William O. Hart, candidate for Lieutenant Governor in 1948

==== Results ====
Social-Democratic primary results
Party	Candidate	Votes	%
Social-Democratic	William O. Hart	2,130	100.00%
Total votes		2,130	100.00%

== General election ==
=== Candidates ===
Major party candidates

- Carl W. Thompson, Democratic
- Walter J. Kohler Jr., Republican

Other candidates

- M. Michael Essin, People's Progressive
- William O. Hart, Social-Democratic

=== Results ===
1950 Wisconsin gubernatorial election
Party	Candidate	Votes	%	±%
Republican	Walter J. Kohler Jr.	605,649	53.21%	−0.88%
Democratic	Carl W. Thompson	525,319	46.16%	+2.05%
Progressive	M. Michael Essin	3,735	0.33%	−0.69%
Social-Democratic	William O. Hart	3,384	0.30%	−0.43%
	Scattering (Note: These are not listed in the Blue Book but are listed in the Board of Canvassers report.)	61	0.01%	
Majority		80,330	7.06%	
Total votes		1,138,148	100.00%	
Republican hold		Swing	-2.92%	

=== Results by county ===
Thompson was the first Democrat since George W. Peck in 1890 to win Eau Claire County.

County	Walter J. Kohler Jr. Republican		Carl W. Thompson Democratic		M. Michael Essin Progressive		William O. Hart Social-Democratic		Scattering Write-in		Margin		Total votes cast
County	#	%	#	%	#	%	#	%	#	%	#	%	Total votes cast
Adams	1,498	54.37%	1,249	45.34%	5	0.18%	3	0.11%	0	0.00%	249	9.04%	2,755
Ashland	3,334	50.65%	3,163	48.06%	78	1.19%	7	0.11%	0	0.00%	171	2.60%	6,582
Barron	5,104	54.79%	4,151	44.56%	37	0.40%	22	0.24%	1	0.01%	953	10.23%	9,315
Bayfield	2,346	52.80%	2,023	45.53%	57	1.28%	17	0.38%	0	0.00%	323	7.27%	4,443
Brown	18,364	56.09%	14,346	43.81%	20	0.06%	12	0.04%	1	0.00%	4,018	12.27%	32,743
Buffalo	2,238	51.88%	2,068	47.94%	5	0.12%	3	0.07%	0	0.00%	170	3.94%	4,314
Burnett	1,546	48.45%	1,633	51.18%	11	0.34%	1	0.03%	0	0.00%	-87	-2.73%	3,191
Calumet	4,404	67.84%	2,077	31.99%	4	0.06%	7	0.11%	0	0.00%	2,327	35.84%	6,492
Chippewa	6,601	52.90%	5,849	46.87%	25	0.20%	3	0.02%	0	0.00%	752	6.03%	12,478
Clark	6,223	60.71%	3,949	38.53%	68	0.66%	10	0.10%	0	0.00%	2,274	22.19%	10,250
Columbia	6,483	55.11%	5,266	44.76%	9	0.08%	5	0.04%	1	0.01%	1,217	10.35%	11,764
Crawford	3,858	54.00%	3,283	45.95%	2	0.03%	1	0.01%	0	0.00%	575	8.05%	7,144
Dane	22,637	39.60%	34,237	59.89%	210	0.37%	80	0.14%	2	0.00%	-11,600	-20.29%	57,166
Dodge	11,736	63.27%	6,774	36.52%	27	0.15%	12	0.06%	0	0.00%	4,962	26.75%	18,549
Door	4,442	69.02%	1,986	30.86%	5	0.08%	3	0.05%	0	0.00%	2,456	38.16%	6,436
Douglas	6,579	41.00%	9,368	58.38%	69	0.43%	30	0.19%	0	0.00%	-2,789	-17.38%	16,046
Dunn	4,116	55.01%	3,354	44.83%	5	0.07%	7	0.09%	0	0.00%	762	10.18%	7,482
Eau Claire	7,569	48.26%	8,034	51.22%	64	0.41%	16	0.10%	2	0.01%	-465	-2.96%	15,685
Florence	643	53.27%	554	45.90%	9	0.75%	1	0.08%	0	0.00%	89	7.37%	1,207
Fond du Lac	14,939	68.67%	6,716	30.87%	83	0.38%	17	0.08%	1	0.00%	8,223	37.80%	21,756
Forest	1,374	43.23%	1,787	56.23%	12	0.38%	5	0.16%	0	0.00%	-413	-13.00%	3,178
Grant	8,165	63.15%	4,746	36.71%	12	0.09%	7	0.05%	0	0.00%	3,419	26.44%	12,930
Green	4,850	61.71%	3,002	38.20%	7	0.09%	0	0.00%	0	0.00%	1,848	23.51%	7,859
Green Lake	4,158	70.05%	1,766	29.75%	9	0.15%	3	0.05%	0	0.00%	2,392	40.30%	5,936
Iowa	3,756	55.17%	3,044	44.71%	7	0.10%	1	0.01%	0	0.00%	712	10.46%	6,808
Iron	1,514	40.97%	2,125	57.51%	47	1.27%	9	0.24%	0	0.00%	-611	-16.54%	3,695
Jackson	2,474	46.77%	2,802	52.97%	7	0.13%	7	0.13%	0	0.00%	-328	-6.20%	5,290
Jefferson	8,541	59.16%	5,876	40.70%	15	0.10%	5	0.03%	0	0.00%	2,665	18.46%	14,437
Juneau	3,522	59.57%	2,383	40.31%	6	0.10%	1	0.02%	0	0.00%	1,139	19.27%	5,912
Kenosha	13,021	44.06%	16,376	55.41%	76	0.26%	80	0.27%	0	0.00%	-3,355	-11.35%	29,553
Kewaunee	3,743	62.08%	2,280	37.82%	3	0.05%	3	0.05%	0	0.00%	1,463	24.27%	6,029
La Crosse	9,887	48.94%	10,168	50.33%	126	0.62%	22	0.11%	0	0.00%	-281	-1.39%	20,203
Lafayette	3,417	50.10%	3,399	49.84%	3	0.04%	1	0.01%	0	0.00%	18	0.26%	6,820
Langlade	3,605	56.07%	2,783	43.28%	34	0.53%	8	0.12%	0	0.00%	822	12.78%	6,430
Lincoln	4,259	59.78%	2,827	39.68%	21	0.29%	13	0.18%	5	0.07%	1,432	20.10%	7,125
Manitowoc	11,977	51.65%	11,159	48.12%	23	0.10%	27	0.12%	3	0.01%	818	3.53%	23,189
Marathon	11,936	51.34%	11,220	48.26%	39	0.17%	50	0.22%	3	0.01%	716	3.08%	23,248
Marinette	6,047	51.32%	5,706	48.43%	17	0.14%	12	0.10%	1	0.01%	341	2.89%	11,783
Marquette	2,078	68.36%	955	31.41%	4	0.13%	3	0.10%	0	0.00%	1,123	36.94%	3,040
Milwaukee	132,224	45.34%	155,804	53.42%	1,338	0.46%	2,257	0.77%	20	0.01%	-23,580	-8.09%	291,643
Monroe	4,789	57.28%	3,550	42.46%	11	0.13%	10	0.12%	0	0.00%	1,239	14.82%	8,360
Oconto	5,357	59.51%	3,614	40.15%	22	0.24%	7	0.08%	2	0.02%	1,743	19.36%	9,002
Oneida	3,652	53.94%	3,090	45.64%	12	0.18%	16	0.24%	0	0.00%	562	8.30%	6,770
Outagamie	17,103	67.44%	8,194	32.31%	43	0.17%	19	0.07%	0	0.00%	8,909	35.13%	25,359
Ozaukee	5,576	60.68%	3,585	39.01%	17	0.19%	11	0.12%	0	0.00%	1,991	21.67%	9,189
Pepin	1,269	57.19%	941	42.41%	7	0.32%	2	0.09%	0	0.00%	328	14.78%	2,219
Pierce	4,050	62.66%	2,402	37.17%	4	0.06%	5	0.08%	2	0.03%	1,648	25.50%	6,463
Polk	3,575	51.15%	3,385	48.43%	14	0.20%	15	0.21%	0	0.00%	190	2.72%	6,989
Portage	5,619	44.97%	6,837	54.72%	20	0.16%	16	0.13%	2	0.02%	-1,218	-9.75%	12,494
Price	3,030	55.10%	2,390	43.46%	59	1.07%	20	0.36%	0	0.00%	640	11.64%	5,499
Racine	21,256	52.06%	19,441	47.61%	93	0.23%	41	0.10%	0	0.00%	1,815	4.45%	40,831
Richland	4,273	65.73%	2,222	34.18%	5	0.08%	1	0.02%	0	0.00%	2,051	31.55%	6,501
Rock	17,706	58.38%	12,565	41.43%	39	0.13%	18	0.06%	0	0.00%	5,141	16.95%	30,328
Rusk	2,705	52.42%	2,416	46.82%	24	0.47%	14	0.27%	1	0.02%	289	5.60%	5,160
Sauk	7,267	57.00%	5,395	42.31%	17	0.13%	68	0.53%	3	0.02%	1,872	14.68%	12,750
Sawyer	2,209	61.36%	1,379	38.31%	4	0.11%	8	0.22%	0	0.00%	830	23.06%	3,600
Shawano	6,598	70.18%	2,780	29.57%	15	0.16%	8	0.09%	1	0.01%	3,818	40.61%	9,402
Sheboygan	16,552	60.13%	10,628	38.61%	223	0.81%	124	0.45%	0	0.00%	5,924	21.52%	27,527
St. Croix	4,172	51.23%	3,941	48.40%	9	0.11%	16	0.20%	5	0.06%	231	2.84%	8,143
Taylor	3,407	55.48%	2,681	43.66%	27	0.44%	26	0.42%	0	0.00%	726	11.82%	6,141
Trempealeau	3,337	50.75%	3,231	49.14%	7	0.11%	0	0.00%	0	0.00%	106	1.61%	6,575
Vernon	4,053	51.72%	3,778	48.21%	4	0.05%	1	0.01%	1	0.01%	275	3.51%	7,837
Vilas	2,792	64.33%	1,503	34.63%	31	0.71%	14	0.32%	0	0.00%	1,289	29.70%	4,340
Walworth	12,733	70.92%	5,189	28.90%	18	0.10%	14	0.08%	0	0.00%	7,544	42.02%	17,954
Washburn	1,968	47.26%	2,181	52.38%	12	0.29%	3	0.07%	0	0.00%	-213	-5.12%	4,164
Washington	7,514	65.78%	3,878	33.95%	20	0.18%	11	0.10%	0	0.00%	3,636	31.83%	11,423
Waukesha	18,762	61.80%	11,493	37.85%	48	0.16%	58	0.19%	0	0.00%	7,269	23.94%	30,361
Waupaca	8,732	74.43%	2,977	25.38%	10	0.09%	10	0.09%	3	0.03%	5,755	49.05%	11,732
Waushara	3,260	74.04%	1,126	25.57%	14	0.32%	3	0.07%	0	0.00%	2,134	48.47%	4,403
Winnebago	18,226	62.13%	10,804	36.83%	257	0.88%	46	0.16%	0	0.00%	7,422	25.30%	29,333
Wood	8,899	54.29%	7,435	45.35%	50	0.31%	8	0.05%	1	0.01%	1,464	8.93%	16,393
Total	605,649	53.21%	525,319	46.16%	3,735	0.33%	3,384	0.30%	61	0.01%	80,330	7.06%	1,138,148

==== Counties that flipped from Democratic to Republican ====
- Sheboygan

==== Counties that flipped from Republican to Democratic ====
- Burnett
- Eau Claire
- Jackson
- La Crosse
- Washburn

== Bibliography ==
- Gubernatorial Elections, 1787-1997. Washington, D.C.: Congressional Quarterly Inc. 1998. ISBN 1-56802-396-0.
- Toepel, M. G.; Kuehn, Hazel L., eds. (1952). The Wisconsin Blue Book, 1952. State of Wisconsin.
