= Walter J. Kohler Jr. =

American politician (1904–1976)

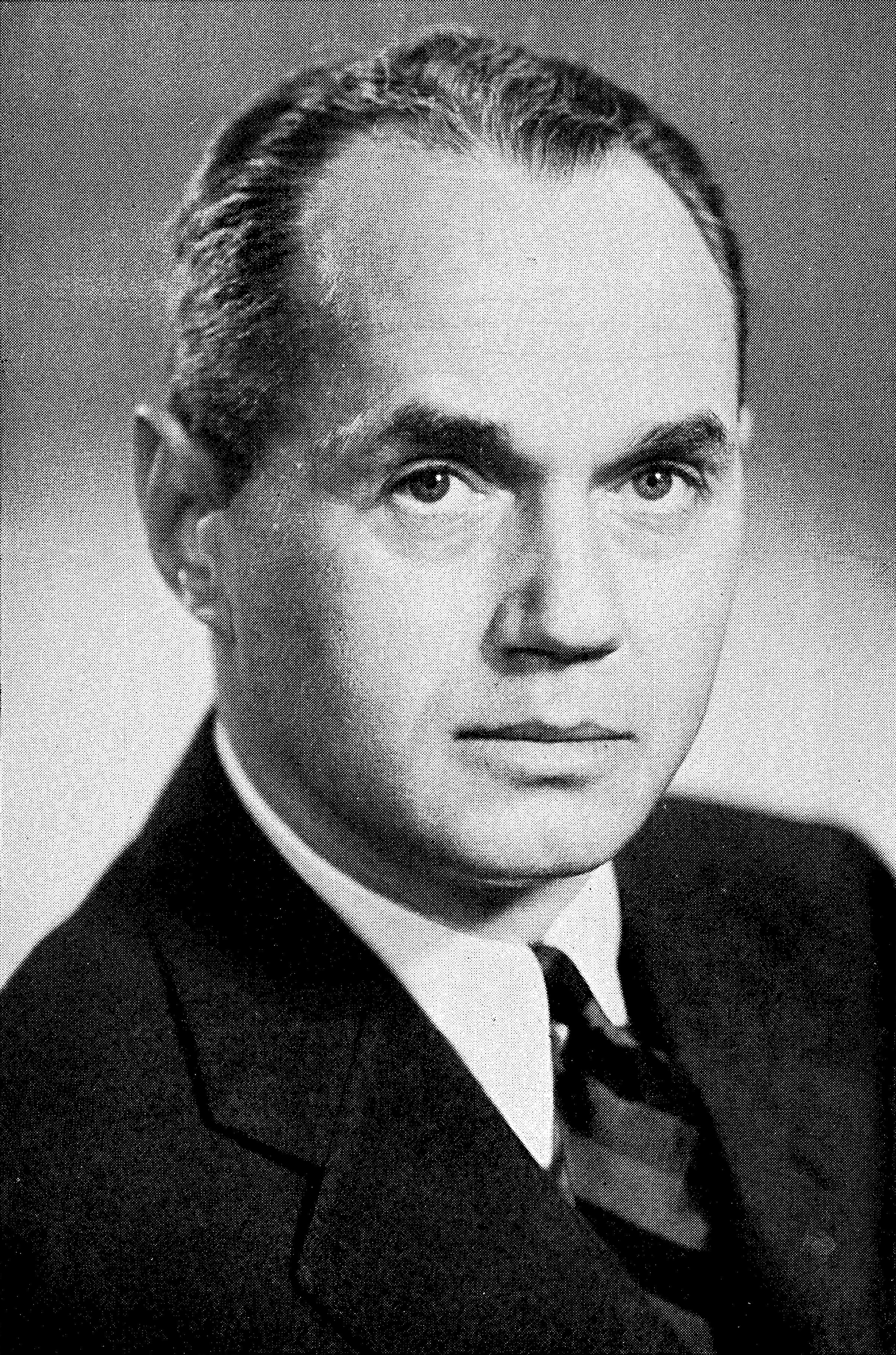
- Official portrait of Kohler as governor

33rd Governor of Wisconsin
- In office January 1, 1951 – January 7, 1957
- Lieutenant: George M. Smith; Warren P. Knowles
- Preceded by: Oscar Rennebohm
- Succeeded by: Vernon W. Thomson

Personal details
- Born: Walter Jodok Kohler Jr. April 4, 1904 Kohler, Wisconsin, U.S.
- Died: March 21, 1976 (aged 71) Sheboygan, Wisconsin, U.S.
- Resting place: Woodland Cemetery, Kohler, Wisconsin
- Party: Republican
- Spouses: Marie Celeste Holden (m. 1932; div. 1947); Charlotte McAleer (m. 1948)
- Relations: Kohler family of Wisconsin
- Children: 2, including Terry
- Parent: Walter J. Kohler Sr. (father)
- Education: Yale University (BA)
- Profession: Businessman

Military service
- Allegiance: United States
- Branch/service: United States Navy
- Years of service: 1942–1945
- Rank: Lt. Commander
- Unit: USS Hancock (CV-19)
- Battles/wars: World War II: Pacific Theater
- Awards: Bronze Star Medal; Asiatic–Pacific Campaign Medal

Walter Jodok Kohler Jr. (April 4, 1904 – March 21, 1976) was an American businessman and politician from Sheboygan County, Wisconsin. He was the 33rd governor of Wisconsin, serving three terms from 1951 to 1957. He was a leading figure of the state and national Republican Party in his era; his role in the 1952 clash between U.S. Senator Joseph R. McCarthy and then-presidential candidate Dwight D. Eisenhower has interested historians for decades. Before running for office, Kohler served as a Naval intelligence officer in World War II, and was decorated for his service in the Pacific theater.

Walter Kohler Jr. was a member of the Kohler family of Wisconsin, his father, Walter J. Kohler Sr., was the 26th governor of Wisconsin, and his son, Terry Kohler, was an unsuccessful candidate for governor in 1982. Walter Kohler Jr. worked for several years as a sales executive for the Kohler Company—the company founded by his grandfather. After his tenure as governor, he worked for the last two decades of his life as president of the Vollrath Company—a company founded by his great-grandfather.

== Personal life ==
Walter Jodok Kohler Jr. was born on April 4, 1904, on his family's lavish estate in Kohler, Wisconsin. His grandfather, John Michael Kohler had founded the Kohler Company in the late 19th century, and his father, Walter J. Kohler Sr. (1875–1940) was active in his family's plumbing supply business and served one term as the State's Governor (1929–31). Walter Jr.'s mother was the former Charlotte "Lottie" Henrietta Schroeder (1869–1947), and he had three brothers: John Michael Kohler III (1902–68), Carl James (1905–60), and Robert Eugene (1908–90).

Walter enjoyed many luxuries while growing up, but they were tempered by a strong-willed father who impressed his boys with the necessity of integrity, hard work, learning, good manners, frugality, and service to the community. Walter followed what was becoming a family tradition by graduating from Phillips Academy in Andover, Massachusetts, and graduated with a B.A. degree from Yale University in 1925.

After graduating, Walter joined the Kohler Company. He knew much about the factory, having been employed there in a number of often grueling jobs during school breaks—another family tradition for males. In 1932, he married Chicago socialite Marie Celeste Holden (1900–74), a divorcée with a child. The couple had two children: Terry Jodok (1934–2016) and Charlotte Nicolette (1936–2012). In 1938, Walter and Celeste built a handsome estate, Windway, in the country along the banks of the Pigeon River north of Kohler in the township of Sheboygan Falls. The home is located two miles directly north of the main plant in Kohler. Walter lived there for the rest of his life. After World War II, he and Celeste divorced. In 1948 Walter married Charlotte McAleer (1912–95), a wealthy divorcée from Philadelphia.

Walter owned two paintings by French artist Georges Seurat including Black Cow in a Meadow, c. 1881, and Two Stonebreakers, c. 1881, that he donated to Yale. Kohler's personal investment counselor, Robert Selle, claimed in an interview that Kohler had bought some Jean-Baptiste-Camille Corot paintings that he also donated to Yale after learning how expensive they would be to insure however no Corot paintings in the Yale University Art Gallery catalog list Kohler as the donator.

In his last years, he and Charlotte traveled widely throughout the world and enjoyed long holidays in Antigua and Florida. He died in Sheboygan on March 21, 1976, following a heart attack. Obituaries emphasized Walter's character and integrity, noting his wartime service, his business success, and his three successive terms as Governor.

== Military service ==
In August 1942, Kohler joined the United States Navy as a Lieutenant and was assigned duty as a combat intelligence officer in the Solomon Islands. In January 1944 he became part of the crew of the USS Hancock, a huge new aircraft carrier of the Essex class assigned to the South Pacific as part of the Third Fleet. Kohler was the ship's air combat intelligence officer. The Hancock was in the thick of fierce fighting throughout the year. On December 3, Kohler was promoted to the rank of Lieutenant Commander, receiving the highest recommendations.

On April 7, 1945, the Hancock was hit by a Kamikaze plane that caused major damage. Walter quietly vowed that if he survived the war, he would go into public service to put an end to such violence and destruction. Soon afterward, exhausted by intense battle, he sought an honorable discharge. On September 24, he left the Navy. Now 41, Kohler had served 37 months of active duty. The Bronze Star Medal and the Asiatic theater ribbon with five battle stars were among his awards.

== Business career ==
Walter discovered after the war that the entire Kohler Company was in the control of his uncle, Herbert V. Kohler. The industrialist told the veteran that he had no future in the company. Using inheritance funds and borrowed money, Walter made an effort to run the Vollrath Company in Sheboygan, Wisconsin, a maker of kitchen utensils and dairy supply products. The Kohlers and Vollraths were related and had long enjoyed economic ties. With the aid of a key insider, Walter became president of Vollrath in April 1947. Under his energetic leadership, the company began almost immediately to increase its profits. Between 1945 and 1950, the net worth of the company virtually doubled, and an assortment of new products appeared. By early 1958 sales had doubled in a decade. Walter led the Vollrath Company until his death. A short time later, Terry Kohler, Walter's son, assumed the reins of the highly expanded and profitable corporation. He had worked full-time for the company since 1963.

== Political career ==
Walter J. Kohler Jr. decided to move into politics in 1948 and he joined Team Stassen for the presidential elections. While this was unsuccessful, his networking and hard work in politics paid off when he became the 33rd governor of Wisconsin in 1951. Walter had experienced politics first hand, being active in his father's reelection campaign in 1932. After returning from the war, he thought of running for the United States Senate, but that was also the driving ambition of Joseph R. McCarthy, an ex-Marine who had run for the Senate two years earlier. Walter had little choice but to step aside.

In the late 1940s, Walter rose within the Wisconsin Republican Party by making friends, working for others, and winning the support of industrialist Tom Coleman, a dominant force within the Party. In 1948, Kohler was a delegate to the national convention and made it clear that he was a moderate Republican in the mold of the Republican presidential candidate, Thomas Dewey.

Dewey's unpredictable loss to Harry S Truman prompted many Republicans for the next few years to employ "Red Scare" tactics. The practice of "irresponsibly" labeling Democratic opponents as Communists or pro-Communists would help many of them win office. Kohler was never sympathetic to the right-wing, McCarthyite wing of the party. Still, he made infrequent gestures in that direction to appeal to the many Wisconsinites who were certain that their junior senator's charges were on target. Moreover, Kohler thought that at times, such as in the case against Alger Hiss, McCarthy and his allies were on the right track.

=== Governor of Wisconsin ===
In 1950, Walter was elected Governor, winning 59 of 71 counties in what was a Republican sweep of state offices. Legislators, journalists, and the public soon praised his friendliness, hard-work, and integrity. During the next two years, Wisconsin prospered economically, had a budget surplus, and enjoyed tax cuts. Of 55 specific gubernatorial proposals for legislation, 47 were passed. The package included two civil rights measures, a hike in old age pensions, and improved unemployment and workmen's compensation benefits.

During his re-election bid in 1952, Kohler worked successfully for the nomination of moderate Dwight D. Eisenhower. When the candidate was about to campaign in Wisconsin, Kohler privately asked Eisenhower to alter a proposed Milwaukee speech that was critical of McCarthy. At the heart of the request was the desire to unify Republican Party and to carry Wisconsin at the polls. Eisenhower reluctantly agreed, and the strategy largely paid off. Republicans won the White House and control of Congress, McCarthy and Kohler (they officially supported each other) were reelected, and Republicans retained control of the state legislature.

Walter admitted to being offered various positions in Washington, D.C., including at least one on the White House staff during his second term as Governor. He turned them all down largely because of the resistance of his wife to further political activity.

The Republican sweep intensified the commitment of local Democrats to gain power. Bill Proxmire, the man Kohler defeated handily, began to campaign the day after the election to win the Governorship in 1954. Kohler defeated Proxmire again in 1954. At the conclusion of his third two-year term in 1956, he had built an impressive record that included advances in higher education, redistricting, highway construction, public welfare, conservation, and the criminal and children's law codes. During his terms in office, 89 of the Governor's 92 vetoes were sustained by the Republican-dominated legislatures. State government under Walter's watch was efficient, clean, and fiscally responsible.

=== Senate campaign ===
In the meantime, Anti-McCarthy forces from the political center and left stepped up their nationwide efforts to bring down the Wisconsin Senator and end the Second Red Scare. In May 1957, Senator McCarthy died unexpectedly. A special election was called to fill the remaining years of his term and, for the third time in five years, Walter Kohler Jr. faced off against William Proxmire in a Wisconsin statewide election.

Kohler and Proxmire campaigned diligently for the vacant Senate seat. The McCarthyite wing of the GOP in large part turned against Walter (as it had against Eisenhower), and this lack of support, accompanied by Proxmire's populist rhetoric and financial support from labor unions, prompted a dramatic upset win for the tireless Democrat. Proxmire would represent Wisconsin in the United States Senate for the next 32 years.

== Later years and death ==
Kohler played a role in the 1960 Republican National Convention, but he then saw himself primarily as a businessman and fundraiser for the American Cancer Society.

Walter's health declined in the late 1960s and early 1970s. He had shingles and was diagnosed with skin cancer and had an operation to remove some cancerous tissue in 1972 at the Mayo Clinic. Then in 1975, Walter underwent heart surgery, which did nothing to improve his condition. He continued to deteriorate until he died of a massive heart attack at Sheboygan Memorial Hospital on March 21, 1976, at the age of 71. He is buried in Kohler's Woodland Cemetery.

== Notes ==
Party political offices
Preceded by Oscar Rennebohm	Republican nominee for Governor of Wisconsin; 1950, 1952, 1954	Succeeded by Vernon Wallace Thomson
Preceded by Joseph McCarthy	Republican nominee for U.S. Senator from Wisconsin (Class 1); 1957	Succeeded by Roland J. Steinle
Political offices
Preceded by Oscar Rennebohm	Governor of Wisconsin; 1951–1957	Succeeded by Vernon Wallace Thomson
