= 1904 Wisconsin gubernatorial election =

- November 8, 1904
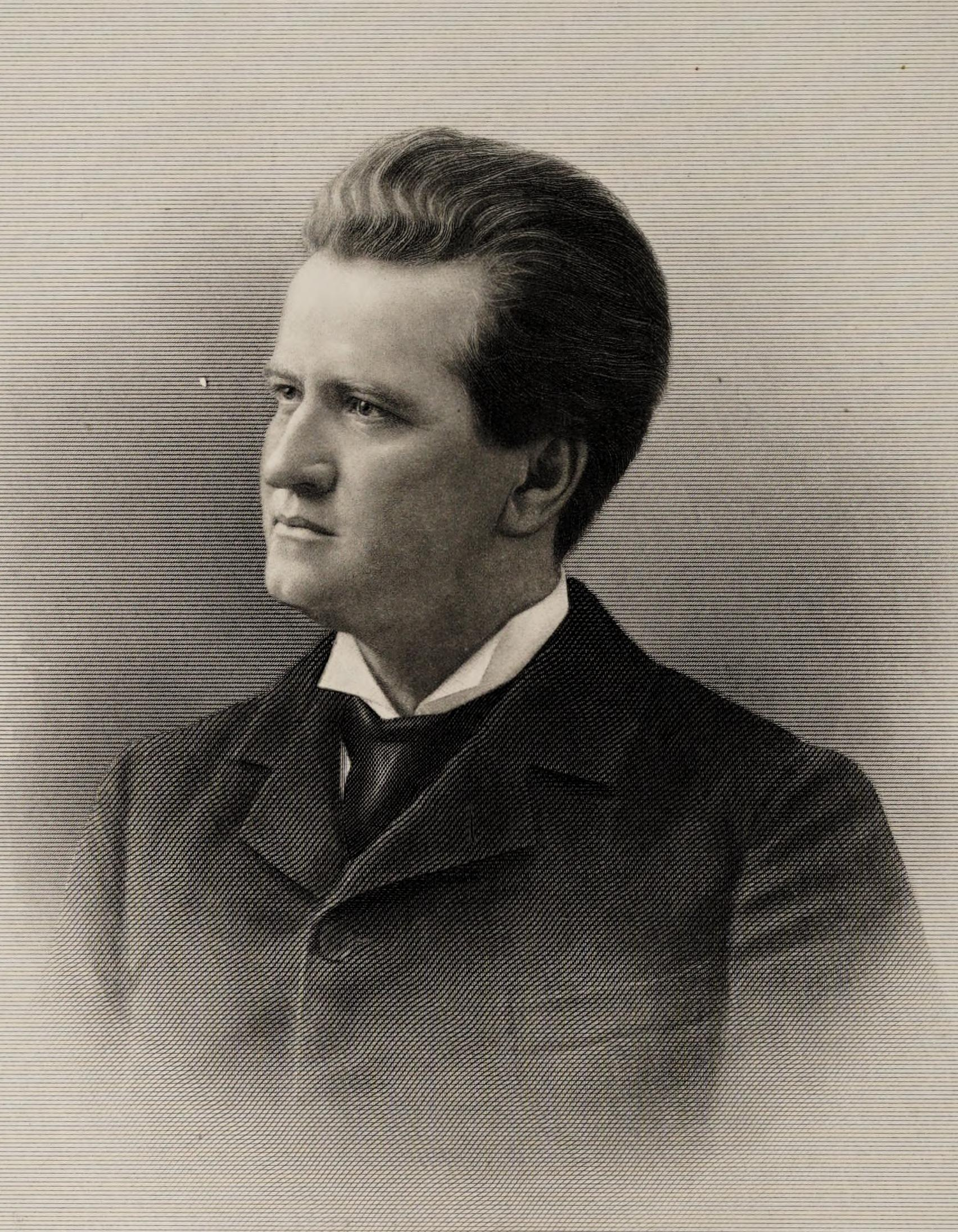

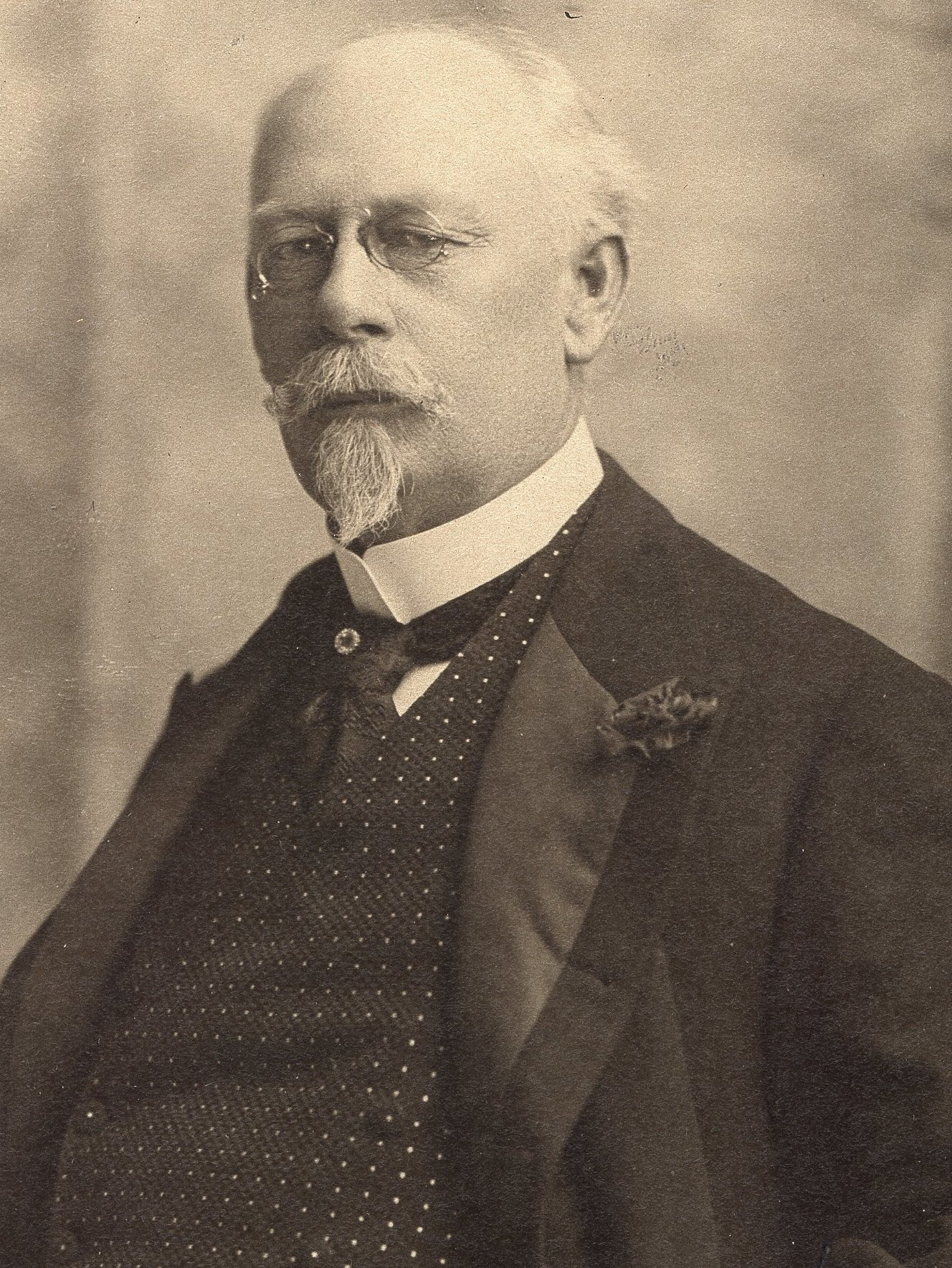

Nominee	Robert M. La Follette	George Wilbur Peck	William A. Arnold
Party	Republican	Democratic	Social-Democratic
Popular vote	227,253	176,301	24,857
Percentage	50.55%	39.22%	5.53%
- County results La Follette : 30–40% 40–50% 50–60% 60–70% 70–80% 80–90% Peck : 40–50% 50–60% 60–70%
Governor before election
Robert M. La Follette
Republican
Elected Governor
Robert M. La Follette
Republican

The 1904 Wisconsin gubernatorial election was held on November 8, 1904.

Incumbent Republican Governor Robert M. La Follette defeated Democratic nominee George Wilbur Peck and Social-Democratic nominee William A. Arnold with 50.55% of the vote.

== Conventions ==
In the aftermath of the 1902 election, the state legislature enacted the direct primary (subject to a statewide referendum) and La Follette's tax reform bill. The new tax law, which required railroads to pay taxes based on property owned rather than profits, resulted in railroads paying nearly double the amount of taxes they had paid before the enactment of the law. Having accomplished his first two major goals, La Follette next focused on regulating railroad rates, but the railroads prevented passage of his bill in 1903. During this period, La Follette became increasingly convinced of the need for a direct income tax in order to minimize tax avoidance by the wealthy. During his governorship, La Follette appointed African-American William Miller for a position in his office.

The Wisconsin Republican party split in the run up to the election due to the incumbent governor Robert La Follette's embrace of progressive ideas such as a state income tax and greater regulation of the railroads. There were two Republican conventions for the Republican nomination, one for La Follette's and one backed by more conservative elements of the Republican party.

After the legislature adjourned in mid-1903, La Follette began lecturing on the Chautauqua circuit, delivering 57 speeches across the Midwest. He also earned the attention of muckraker journalists like Ray Stannard Baker and Lincoln Steffens, many of whom supported La Follette's progressive agenda. La Follette's continued movement towards progressivism alienated many Republican Party leaders, and La Follette's followers and conservative party leaders held separate conventions in 1904; ultimately, the state Supreme Court declared that La Follette was the Republican Party's 1904 gubernatorial nominee.

== General election ==
=== Candidates ===
Major party candidates

- George Wilbur Peck, Democratic, former Governor
- Robert M. La Follette, Republican, incumbent Governor

Other candidates

- Edward Scofield, National Republican, former Governor (replacing Samuel A. Cook)
- William H. Clark, Prohibition, Prohibition nominee for Wisconsin's 6th congressional district in 1898
- William A. Arnold, Social-Democratic, printer
- Charles M. Minkley, Socialist Labor, Socialist Labor nominee for Wisconsin's 5th congressional district in 1902

=== Results ===
In the general election in Wisconsin that year, La Follette won 51 percent of the vote, but he ran far behind Republican President Theodore Roosevelt, who took 63 percent of the Wisconsin's vote in the national election by comparison. In that same election, Wisconsin voters approved the implementation of the direct primary.

1904 Wisconsin gubernatorial election (Note: One must exercise caution using the Blue Book as a source for Wisconsin election data for the period of 1890-1920 as it was unreliable during this period. However, the Blue Book's data for 1904 does match up with the Board of Canvassers reports.)
Party	Candidate	Votes	%	±%
Republican	Robert M. La Follette (incumbent)	227,253	50.55%	−2.34%
Democratic	George W. Peck	176,301	39.22%	−0.66%
Social Democratic	William A. Arnold	24,857	5.53%	+1.16%
National Republican	Edward Scofield	12,136	2.70%	
Prohibition	William H. Clark	8,764	1.95%	−0.69%
Socialist Labor	Charles M. Minkley	249	0.06%	−0.16%
	Scattering	10	0.00%	
Majority		50,952	11.33%	
Total votes		449,570	100.00%	
Republican hold		Swing	-1.68%	

=== Results by county ===
This is one of only four gubernatorial elections in which Door County has voted for the Democratic candidate and the only one in the 20th century; Door County had last voted Democratic in 1859 and would not do so again until 2006. Florence County voted Democratic for the first time ever and would not do so again until 1954.

County	Robert M. La Follette Republican		George W. Peck Democratic		William A. Arnold Social-Democratic		Edward Scofield National Republican		William H. Clark Prohibition		Charles M. Minkley Socialist Labor		Margin		Total votes cast
County	#	%	#	%	#	%	#	%	#	%	#	%	#	%	Total votes cast
Adams	1,317	74.36%	360	20.33%	24	1.36%	30	1.69%	40	2.26%	0	0.00%	957	54.04%	1,771
Ashland	2,928	60.95%	1,561	32.49%	139	2.89%	88	1.83%	86	1.79%	2	0.04%	1,367	28.46%	4,804
Barron	3,112	67.76%	1,124	24.47%	68	1.48%	81	1.76%	200	4.35%	8	0.17%	1,988	43.28%	4,593
Bayfield	2,512	79.34%	499	15.76%	27	0.85%	50	1.58%	74	2.34%	4	0.13%	2,013	63.58%	3,166
Brown	5,027	54.46%	3,692	40.00%	211	2.29%	190	2.06%	107	1.16%	3	0.03%	1,335	14.46%	9,230
Buffalo	1,933	61.21%	1,127	35.69%	6	0.19%	41	1.30%	51	1.61%	0	0.00%	806	25.52%	3,158
Burnett	1,256	88.02%	93	6.52%	17	1.19%	19	1.33%	41	2.87%	1	0.07%	1,163	81.50%	1,427
Calumet	1,438	45.12%	1,571	49.29%	78	2.45%	70	2.20%	30	0.94%	0	0.00%	-133	-4.17%	3,187
Chippewa	3,362	59.17%	2,061	36.27%	37	0.65%	101	1.78%	115	2.02%	6	0.11%	1,301	22.90%	5,682
Clark	2,851	51.88%	2,315	42.13%	40	0.73%	120	2.18%	167	3.04%	2	0.04%	536	9.75%	5,495
Columbia	3,580	50.81%	3,011	42.73%	111	1.58%	169	2.40%	175	2.48%	0	0.00%	569	8.08%	7,046
Crawford	1,638	43.71%	1,996	53.27%	12	0.32%	55	1.47%	44	1.17%	2	0.05%	-358	-9.55%	3,747
Dane	9,388	53.87%	7,268	41.71%	154	0.88%	277	1.59%	338	1.94%	0	0.00%	2,120	12.17%	17,426 (Note: Includes 1 Scattering vote)
Dodge	3,035	31.50%	6,167	64.00%	53	0.55%	248	2.57%	132	1.37%	1	0.01%	-3,132	-32.50%	9,636
Door	1,383	41.73%	1,716	51.78%	24	0.72%	96	2.90%	95	2.87%	0	0.00%	-333	-10.05%	3,314
Douglas	4,221	66.98%	1,428	22.66%	386	6.13%	114	1.81%	123	1.95%	30	0.48%	2,793	44.32%	6,302
Dunn	2,886	70.56%	925	22.62%	57	1.39%	111	2.71%	111	2.71%	0	0.00%	1,961	47.95%	4,090
Eau Claire	3,230	54.55%	2,337	39.47%	144	2.43%	70	1.18%	137	2.31%	3	0.05%	893	15.08%	5,921
Florence	302	45.35%	343	51.50%	3	0.45%	13	1.95%	5	0.75%	0	0.00%	-41	-6.16%	666
Fond du Lac	5,271	44.06%	6,115	51.12%	82	0.69%	333	2.78%	161	1.35%	1	0.01%	-844	-7.06%	11,963
Forest	906	73.06%	251	20.24%	19	1.53%	48	3.87%	15	1.21%	1	0.08%	655	52.82%	1,240
Gates	1,208	69.35%	436	25.03%	19	1.09%	36	2.07%	43	2.47%	0	0.00%	772	44.32%	1,742
Grant	4,440	49.27%	4,170	46.28%	46	0.51%	193	2.14%	161	1.79%	1	0.01%	270	3.00%	9,011
Green	2,346	48.07%	2,170	44.47%	97	1.99%	80	1.64%	187	3.83%	0	0.00%	176	3.61%	4,880
Green Lake	1,610	44.95%	1,778	49.64%	25	0.70%	96	2.68%	73	2.04%	0	0.00%	-168	-4.69%	3,582
Iowa	2,931	56.52%	2,066	39.84%	13	0.25%	55	1.06%	121	2.33%	0	0.00%	865	16.68%	5,186
Iron	899	57.63%	605	38.78%	10	0.64%	23	1.47%	23	1.47%	0	0.00%	294	18.85%	1,560
Jackson	2,228	66.23%	960	28.54%	24	0.71%	72	2.14%	80	2.38%	0	0.00%	1,268	37.69%	3,364
Jefferson	2,982	38.01%	4,477	57.07%	78	0.99%	171	2.18%	136	1.73%	0	0.00%	-1,495	-19.06%	7,845
Juneau	2,642	56.89%	1,806	38.89%	28	0.60%	102	2.20%	66	1.42%	0	0.00%	836	18.00%	4,644
Kenosha	2,608	47.74%	2,277	41.68%	378	6.92%	126	2.31%	60	1.10%	13	0.24%	331	6.06%	5,463
Kewaunee	1,475	45.67%	1,586	49.10%	99	3.07%	35	1.08%	35	1.08%	0	0.00%	-111	-3.44%	3,230
La Crosse	4,287	48.07%	4,239	47.53%	83	0.93%	120	1.35%	186	2.09%	3	0.03%	48	0.54%	8,919
Lafayette	2,522	50.86%	2,310	46.58%	9	0.18%	56	1.13%	61	1.23%	1	0.02%	212	4.28%	4,959
Langlade	1,713	53.13%	1,410	43.73%	16	0.50%	51	1.58%	33	1.02%	1	0.03%	303	9.40%	3,224
Lincoln	2,175	53.56%	1,675	41.25%	89	2.19%	75	1.85%	46	1.13%	1	0.02%	500	12.31%	4,061
Manitowoc	3,898	44.57%	3,977	45.48%	557	6.37%	213	2.44%	100	1.14%	0	0.00%	-79	-0.90%	8,745
Marathon	4,782	48.98%	4,556	46.66%	131	1.34%	160	1.64%	131	1.34%	4	0.04%	226	2.31%	9,764
Marinette	3,125	60.27%	1,519	29.30%	186	3.59%	209	4.03%	143	2.76%	3	0.06%	1,606	30.97%	5,185
Marquette	1,160	46.53%	1,192	47.81%	7	0.28%	58	2.33%	75	3.01%	1	0.04%	-32	-1.28%	2,493
Milwaukee	28,185	38.63%	23,143	31.72%	17,394	23.84%	3,228	4.42%	918	1.26%	91	0.12%	5,042	6.91%	72,959
Monroe	3,146	53.22%	2,483	42.01%	26	0.44%	108	1.83%	148	2.50%	0	0.00%	663	11.22%	5,911
Oconto	2,563	56.92%	1,703	37.82%	43	0.95%	138	3.06%	54	1.20%	2	0.04%	860	19.10%	4,503
Oneida	1,424	61.62%	689	29.81%	119	5.15%	39	1.69%	36	1.56%	4	0.17%	735	31.80%	2,311
Outagamie	5,042	53.44%	3,996	42.36%	74	0.78%	216	2.29%	105	1.11%	1	0.01%	1,046	11.09%	9,434
Ozaukee	1,258	39.80%	1,746	55.24%	93	2.94%	37	1.17%	26	0.82%	1	0.03%	-488	-15.44%	3,161
Pepin	848	60.01%	496	35.10%	1	0.07%	43	3.04%	24	1.70%	1	0.07%	352	24.91%	1,413
Pierce	2,906	67.57%	1,124	26.13%	21	0.49%	130	3.02%	120	2.79%	0	0.00%	1,782	41.43%	4,301
Polk	2,832	80.45%	443	12.59%	68	1.93%	79	2.24%	93	2.64%	3	0.09%	2,389	67.87%	3,520 (Note: Includes 2 Scattering votes)
Portage	2,933	48.84%	2,825	47.04%	30	0.50%	131	2.18%	86	1.43%	0	0.00%	108	1.80%	6,005
Price	1,817	65.57%	802	28.94%	52	1.88%	32	1.15%	64	2.31%	1	0.04%	1,015	36.63%	2,771 (Note: Includes 3 Scattering votes)
Racine	4,635	45.30%	3,639	35.56%	1,232	12.04%	464	4.53%	249	2.43%	13	0.13%	996	9.73%	10,232
Richland	2,075	47.34%	1,923	43.87%	24	0.55%	99	2.26%	262	5.98%	0	0.00%	152	3.47%	4,383
Rock	5,242	45.65%	4,940	43.02%	326	2.84%	635	5.53%	340	2.96%	1	0.01%	302	2.63%	11,484
Sauk	3,297	46.08%	3,280	45.84%	31	0.43%	228	3.19%	319	4.46%	0	0.00%	17	0.24%	7,155
Sawyer	739	69.72%	264	24.91%	10	0.94%	21	1.98%	25	2.36%	1	0.09%	475	44.81%	1,060
Shawano	3,033	59.54%	1,836	36.04%	22	0.43%	95	1.86%	106	2.08%	2	0.04%	1,197	23.50%	5,094
Sheboygan	4,936	45.13%	4,598	42.04%	794	7.26%	423	3.87%	167	1.53%	18	0.16%	338	3.09%	10,937
St. Croix	3,226 (Note: The 1905 Blue Book mistakenly gives this figure as 3,326)	55.48%	2,389	41.08%	61	1.05%	47	0.81%	91	1.56%	1	0.02%	837	14.39%	5,815
Taylor	1,456	57.37%	966	38.06%	31	1.22%	49	1.93%	35	1.38%	1	0.04%	490	19.31%	2,538
Trempealeau	3,202	67.60%	1,297	27.38%	6	0.13%	85	1.79%	147	3.10%	0	0.00%	1,905	40.22%	4,737
Vernon	4,378	75.73%	1,126	19.48%	20	0.35%	78	1.35%	178	3.08%	1	0.02%	3,252	56.25%	5,781
Vilas	1,217	65.18%	566	30.32%	30	1.61%	35	1.87%	18	0.96%	1	0.05%	651	34.87%	1,867
Walworth	3,246	48.00%	2,948	43.60%	104	1.54%	219	3.24%	245	3.62%	0	0.00%	298	4.41%	6,762
Washburn	812	62.65%	392	30.25%	31	2.39%	37	2.85%	24	1.85%	0	0.00%	420	32.41%	1,296
Washington	1,999	40.42%	2,717	54.94%	50	1.01%	136	2.75%	41	0.83%	2	0.04%	-718	-14.52%	4,945
Waukesha	4,179	49.36%	3,767	44.49%	193	2.28%	147	1.74%	180	2.13%	1	0.01%	412	4.87%	8,467
Waupaca	4,690	68.90%	1,643	24.14%	50	0.73%	182	2.67%	240	3.53%	2	0.03%	3,047	44.76%	6,807
Waushara	2,663	73.14%	751	20.63%	18	0.49%	128	3.52%	79	2.17%	2	0.05%	1,912	52.51%	3,641
Winnebago	5,422	43.28%	6,134	48.96%	195	1.56%	503	4.01%	269	2.15%	6	0.05%	-712	-5.68%	12,529
Wood	3,245	53.81%	2,506	41.56%	121	2.01%	89	1.48%	68	1.13%	1	0.02%	739	12.26%	6,030
Total	227,253	50.55%	176,301	39.22%	24,857	5.53%	12,136	2.70%	8,764	1.95%	249	0.06%	50,952	11.33%	449,570

==== Counties that flipped from Democratic to Republican ====
- Langlade
- Taylor

==== Counties that flipped from Republican to Democratic ====
- Crawford
- Door
- Florence
- Manitowoc
- Taylor
- Winnebago

== Aftermath ==
During the 1904 campaign, La Follette pledged that he would not resign as governor during his term, but after winning re-election he directed state representative Irvine Lenroot, a close political ally, to secure his election to the United States Senate. Shortly after La Follette delivered the inaugural message of his third term as governor, Lenroot began meeting with other legislators to assure that La Follette would be able to win election to the Senate; at that time, the state legislature elected senators. La Follette was formally nominated by the Republican caucus on January 23, 1905, and the state legislature chose him the following day. La Follette delayed accepting the nomination and continued to serve as governor until December 1905, when he announced his resignation. Throughout 1905, La Follette continued to push his progressive policies, including the state regulation of railroad rates. The state legislature passed a relatively weak regulation bill that La Follette considered vetoing, but he ultimately signed the law. Lieutenant Governor James O. Davidson succeeded La Follette as governor and went on to win re-election in 1906.

== Bibliography ==
- Glashan, Roy R. (1979). American Governors and Gubernatorial Elections, 1775-1978. Meckler Books. ISBN 0-930466-17-9.
- Gubernatorial Elections, 1787-1997. Washington, D.C.: Congressional Quarterly Inc. 1998. ISBN 1-56802-396-0.
- Erickson, Halford, ed. (1905). The Blue Book of the State of Wisconsin. Madison: Democrat Printing Co.
- Margulies, Herbert F. (1976). "Robert M. La Follette Goes to the Senate, 1905". The Wisconsin Magazine of History. 59 (3): 214–225. JSTOR 4635046.
- Thelen, David P. (1976). Robert M. La Follette and the Insurgent Spirit. Boston: Little, Brown. ISBN 978-0-316-83927-3. OL 5198113M.
