= 1954 Wisconsin gubernatorial election =

- November 2, 1954
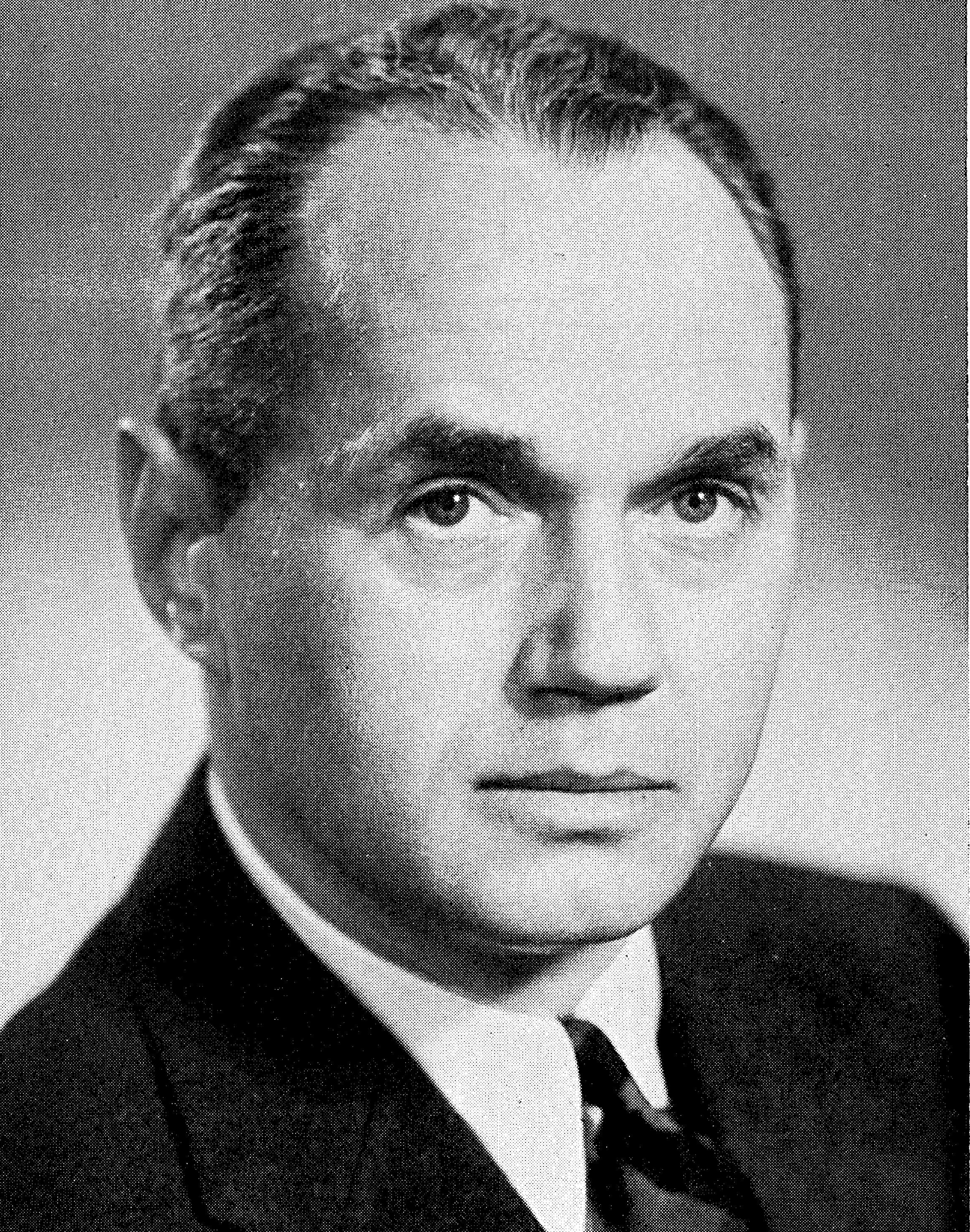

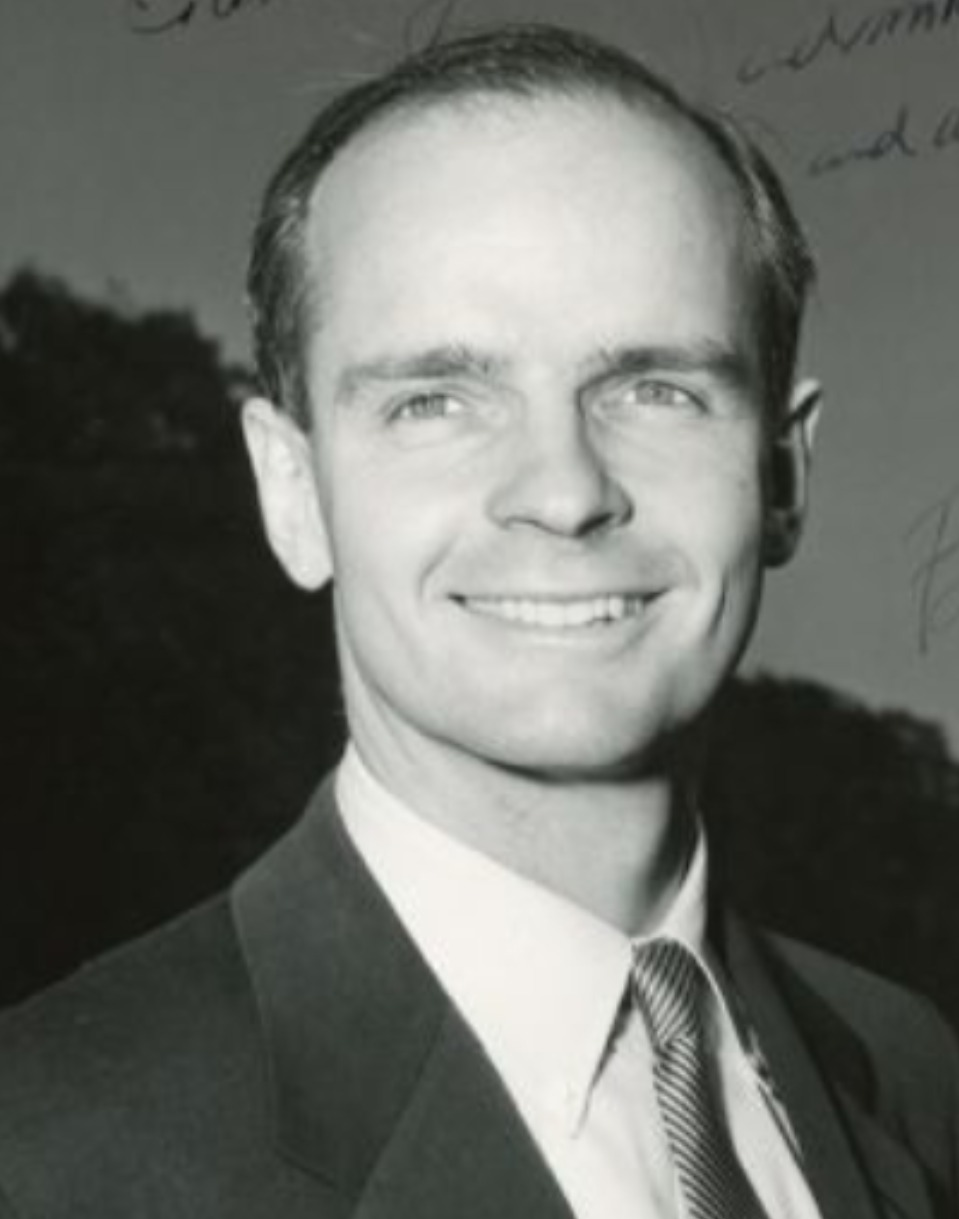
Nominee	Walter J. Kohler Jr.	William Proxmire
Party	Republican	Democratic
Popular vote	596,158	560,747
Percentage	51.45%	48.40%
- County results Kohler: 50–60% 60–70% 70–80% Proxmire: 40–50% 50–60% 60–70%
Governor before election
Walter J. Kohler Jr.
Republican
Elected Governor
Walter J. Kohler Jr.
Republican

The 1954 Wisconsin gubernatorial election was held on November 2, 1954.

Incumbent Republican Governor Walter J. Kohler Jr. defeated Democratic nominee William Proxmire in a rematch of the 1952 election with 51.45% of the vote.

== Primary election ==
Primary elections were held on September 14, 1954.

=== Republican party ===
==== Candidates ====
- Walter J. Kohler Jr., incumbent governor

==== Results ====
Republican primary results
Party	Candidate	Votes	%
Republican	Walter J. Kohler Jr. (incumbent)	331,006	100.00%
Total votes		331,006	100.00%

=== Democratic party ===
==== Candidates ====
- James E. Doyle, former chairman of the Wisconsin Democratic Party
- William Proxmire, Democratic nominee for governor in 1952

==== Results ====
Democratic primary results
Party	Candidate	Votes	%
Democratic	William Proxmire	141,548	62.43%
Democratic	James E. Doyle	85,187	37.57%
Total votes		226,735	100.00%

== General election ==
=== Candidates ===
- William Proxmire, Democratic
- Walter J. Kohler Jr., Republican
- Arthur Wepfer, Socialist Labor

=== Results ===
1954 Wisconsin gubernatorial election
Party	Candidate	Votes	%	±%
Republican	Walter J. Kohler Jr. (incumbent)	596,158	51.45%	−11.03%
Democratic	William Proxmire	560,747	48.40%	+11.13%
Socialist Labor (Note: "Independent Socialist Labor")	Arthur Wepfer	1,722	0.15%	
	Scattering (Note: These are not listed in the Blue Book but are listed in the Board of Canvassers report.)	39	0.00%	
Majority		35,411	3.06%	
Total votes		1,158,666	100.00%	
Republican hold		Swing	-22.16%	

=== Results by county ===
Proxmire was the first Democrat since George W. Peck in 1904 to win Florence County. By voting for Proxmire, Rusk County backed the losing candidate for the first time since its establishment in 1901.

County	Walter J. Kohler Jr. Republican		William Proxmire Democratic		Arthur Wepfer Socialist Labor		Margin		Total votes cast
County	#	%	#	%	#	%	#	%	Total votes cast
Adams	1,440	51.01%	1,380	48.88%	3	0.11%	60	2.13%	2,823
Ashland	2,730	44.40%	3,414	55.52%	5	0.08%	-684	-11.12%	6,149
Barron	5,874	52.81%	5,245	47.15%	4	0.04%	629	5.65%	11,123
Bayfield	1,978	45.82%	2,327	53.90%	0	0.00%	-349	-8.08%	4,317 (Note: Includes 12 Scattering votes)
Brown	18,832	54.00%	16,009	45.91%	32	0.09%	2,823	8.09%	34,874 (Note: Includes 1 Scattering vote)
Buffalo	2,290	54.32%	1,926	45.68%	0	0.00%	364	8.63%	4,216
Burnett	1,602	50.60%	1,559	49.24%	3	0.09%	43	1.36%	3,166 (Note: Includes 2 Scattering votes)
Calumet	4,244	65.47%	2,235	34.48%	2	0.03%	2,009	30.99%	6,482
Chippewa	6,212	49.01%	6,452	50.90%	11	0.09%	-240	-1.89%	12,675
Clark	5,593	52.10%	5,142	47.90%	0	0.00%	451	4.20%	10,735
Columbia	6,431	59.35%	4,390	40.51%	15	0.14%	2,041	18.84%	10,836
Crawford	3,388	56.83%	2,569	43.09%	5	0.08%	819	13.74%	5,962
Dane	25,220	42.78%	33,634	57.05%	98	0.17%	-8,414	-14.27%	58,955 (Note: Includes 3 Scattering votes)
Dodge	11,429	61.42%	7,168	38.52%	11	0.06%	4,261	22.90%	18,608
Door	4,399	64.28%	2,444	35.72%	0	0.00%	1,955	28.57%	6,843
Douglas	6,393	37.48%	10,655	62.47%	9	0.05%	-4,262	-24.99%	17,057
Dunn	4,367	54.17%	3,692	45.80%	1	0.01%	675	8.37%	8,062
Eau Claire	8,228	47.36%	9,111	52.44%	34	0.20%	-883	-5.08%	17,374
Florence	741	48.15%	786	51.07%	12	0.78%	-45	-2.92%	1,539
Fond du Lac	14,436	63.08%	8,423	36.80%	27	0.12%	6,013	26.27%	22,886
Forest	1,320	39.04%	2,055	60.78%	6	0.18%	-735	-21.74%	3,381
Grant	8,545	70.27%	3,595	29.56%	20	0.16%	4,950	40.70%	12,161
Green	4,986	65.25%	2,648	34.66%	7	0.09%	2,338	30.60%	7,641
Green Lake	3,838	72.57%	1,443	27.28%	8	0.15%	2,395	45.28%	5,289
Iowa	3,233	56.41%	2,493	43.50%	5	0.09%	740	12.91%	5,731
Iron	1,258	33.74%	2,464	66.08%	7	0.19%	-1,206	-32.34%	3,729
Jackson	2,552	45.27%	3,077	54.59%	8	0.14%	-525	-9.31%	5,637
Jefferson	8,503	56.37%	6,573	43.58%	8	0.05%	1,930	12.80%	15,084
Juneau	3,466	60.66%	2,231	39.04%	17	0.30%	1,235	21.61%	5,714
Kenosha	12,759	41.29%	18,120	58.64%	21	0.07%	-5,361	-17.35%	30,900
Kewaunee	3,558	54.35%	2,982	45.55%	6	0.09%	576	8.80%	6,546
La Crosse	12,023	53.24%	10,497	46.48%	64	0.28%	1,526	6.76%	22,584
Lafayette	2,976	58.57%	2,104	41.41%	1	0.02%	872	17.16%	5,081
Langlade	3,460	48.62%	3,649	51.28%	7	0.10%	-189	-2.66%	7,116
Lincoln	4,166	56.99%	3,141	42.97%	3	0.04%	1,025	14.02%	7,310
Manitowoc	11,118	48.96%	11,557	50.89%	35	0.15%	-439	-1.93%	22,710
Marathon	11,771	44.75%	14,488	55.08%	45	0.17%	-2,717	-10.33%	26,304
Marinette	5,671	51.27%	5,387	48.70%	4	0.04%	284	2.57%	11,062
Marquette	2,225	67.61%	1,062	32.27%	4	0.12%	1,163	35.34%	3,291
Milwaukee	129,318	44.16%	162,858	55.62%	631	0.22%	-33,540	-11.45%	292,815 (Note: Includes 8 Scattering votes)
Monroe	4,603	56.58%	3,530	43.39%	3	0.04%	1,073	13.19%	8,136
Oconto	4,606	54.91%	3,776	45.01%	7	0.08%	830	9.89%	8,389
Oneida	3,766	53.52%	3,266	46.42%	4	0.06%	500	7.11%	7,036
Outagamie	16,565	65.12%	8,826	34.70%	45	0.18%	7,739	30.43%	25,436
Ozaukee	5,557	58.50%	3,930	41.37%	12	0.13%	1,627	17.13%	9,499
Pepin	1,141	57.66%	835	42.19%	2	0.10%	306	15.46%	1,979
Pierce	4,363	60.61%	2,827	39.27%	9	0.13%	1,536	21.34%	7,199
Polk	3,901	51.84%	3,616	48.05%	8	0.11%	285	3.79%	7,525
Portage	5,168	40.42%	7,605	59.48%	11	0.09%	-2,437	-19.06%	12,785
Price	2,692	47.12%	3,002	52.55%	19	0.33%	-310	-5.43%	5,713
Racine	19,158	45.80%	22,634	54.11%	34	0.08%	-3,476	-8.31%	41,826
Richland	3,949	60.20%	2,603	39.68%	6	0.09%	1,346	20.52%	6,560
Rock	16,633	58.27%	11,852	41.52%	60	0.21%	4,781	16.75%	28,545
Rusk	2,447	49.86%	2,448	49.88%	11	0.22%	-1	-0.02%	4,908
Sauk	7,065	59.40%	4,816	40.49%	12	0.10%	2,249	18.91%	11,893
Sawyer	2,078	59.05%	1,439	40.89%	2	0.06%	639	18.16%	3,519
Shawano	6,566	64.32%	3,634	35.60%	8	0.08%	2,932	28.72%	10,208
Sheboygan	18,512	55.28%	14,821	44.26%	153	0.46%	3,691	11.02%	33,486
St. Croix	4,700	53.10%	4,148	46.86%	4	0.05%	552	6.24%	8,852
Taylor	2,399	46.83%	2,713	52.96%	11	0.21%	-314	-6.13%	5,123
Trempealeau	3,680	47.30%	4,095	52.63%	5	0.06%	-415	-5.33%	7,780
Vernon	4,099	48.57%	4,337	51.39%	3	0.04%	-238	-2.82%	8,439
Vilas	2,564	63.70%	1,457	36.20%	4	0.10%	1,107	27.50%	4,025
Walworth	9,622	68.86%	4,339	31.05%	13	0.09%	5,283	37.81%	13,974
Washburn	1,948	52.39%	1,768	47.55%	2	0.05%	180	4.84%	3,718
Washington	6,924	64.54%	3,804	35.46%	0	0.00%	3,120	29.08%	10,728
Waukesha	20,358	57.53%	15,001	42.39%	26	0.07%	5,357	15.14%	35,386
Waupaca	8,185	71.44%	3,266	28.51%	5	0.04%	4,919	42.93%	11,457
Waushara	3,386	72.03%	1,305	27.76%	10	0.21%	2,081	44.27%	4,701
Winnebago	18,428	62.21%	11,170	37.71%	26	0.09%	7,258	24.50%	29,624
Wood	8,522	55.16%	6,899	44.66%	28	0.18%	1,623	10.51%	15,449
Total	596,158	51.45%	560,747	48.40%	1,722	0.15%	35,411	3.06%	1,158,666

==== Counties that flipped from Republican to Democratic ====
- Ashland
- Bayfield
- Chippewa
- Dane
- Douglas
- Eau Claire
- Florence
- Forest
- Jackson
- Kenosha
- Langlade
- Manitowoc
- Marathon
- Portage
- Price
- Racine
- Rusk
- Taylor
- Trempealeau
- Vernon

== Bibliography ==
- Gubernatorial Elections, 1787-1997. Washington, D.C.: Congressional Quarterly Inc. 1998. ISBN 1-56802-396-0.
- Toepel, M. J.; Kuehn, Hazel L., eds. (1956). The Wisconsin Blue Book, 1956. State of Wisconsin.
