= 1952 Wisconsin gubernatorial election =

- November 4, 1952
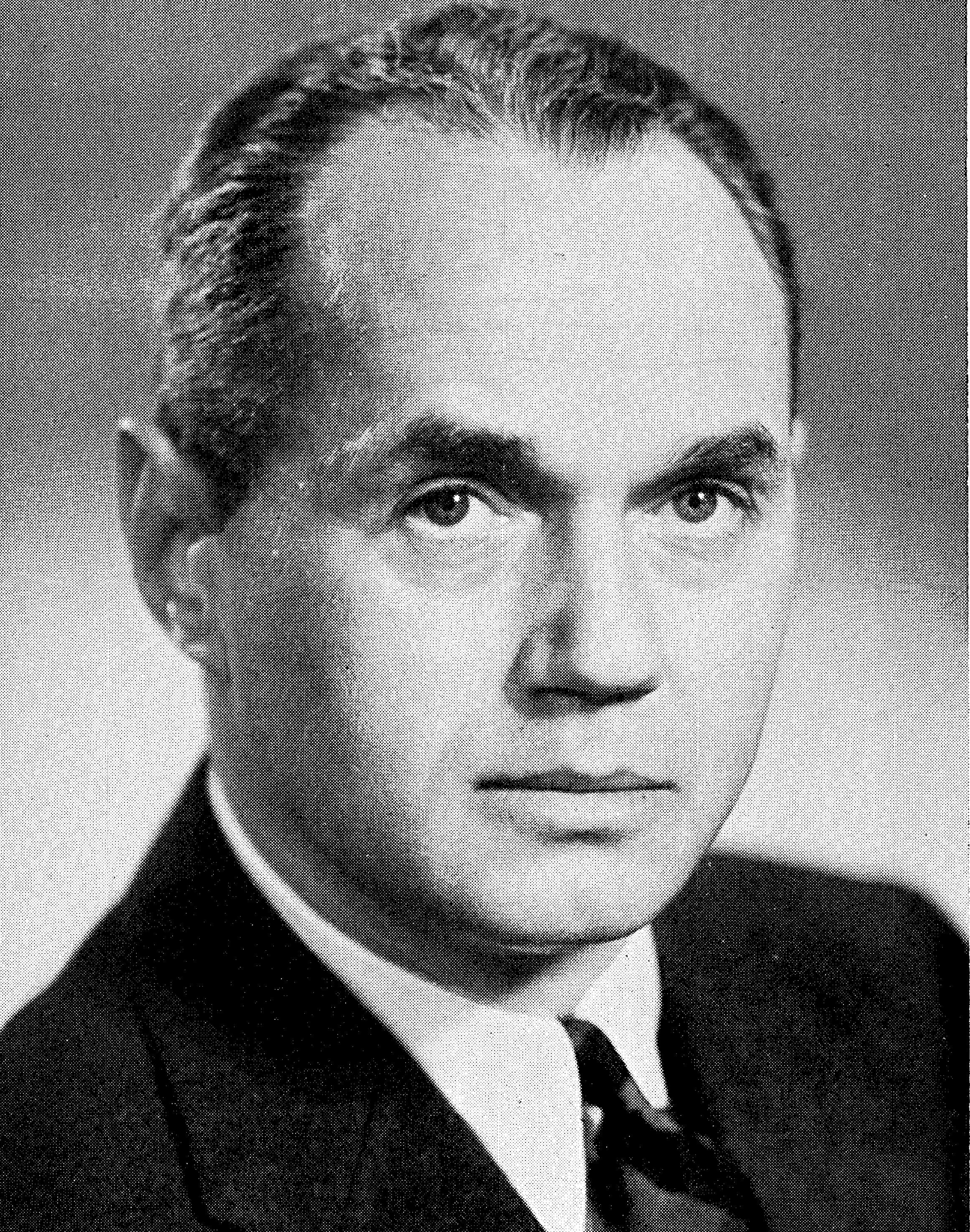

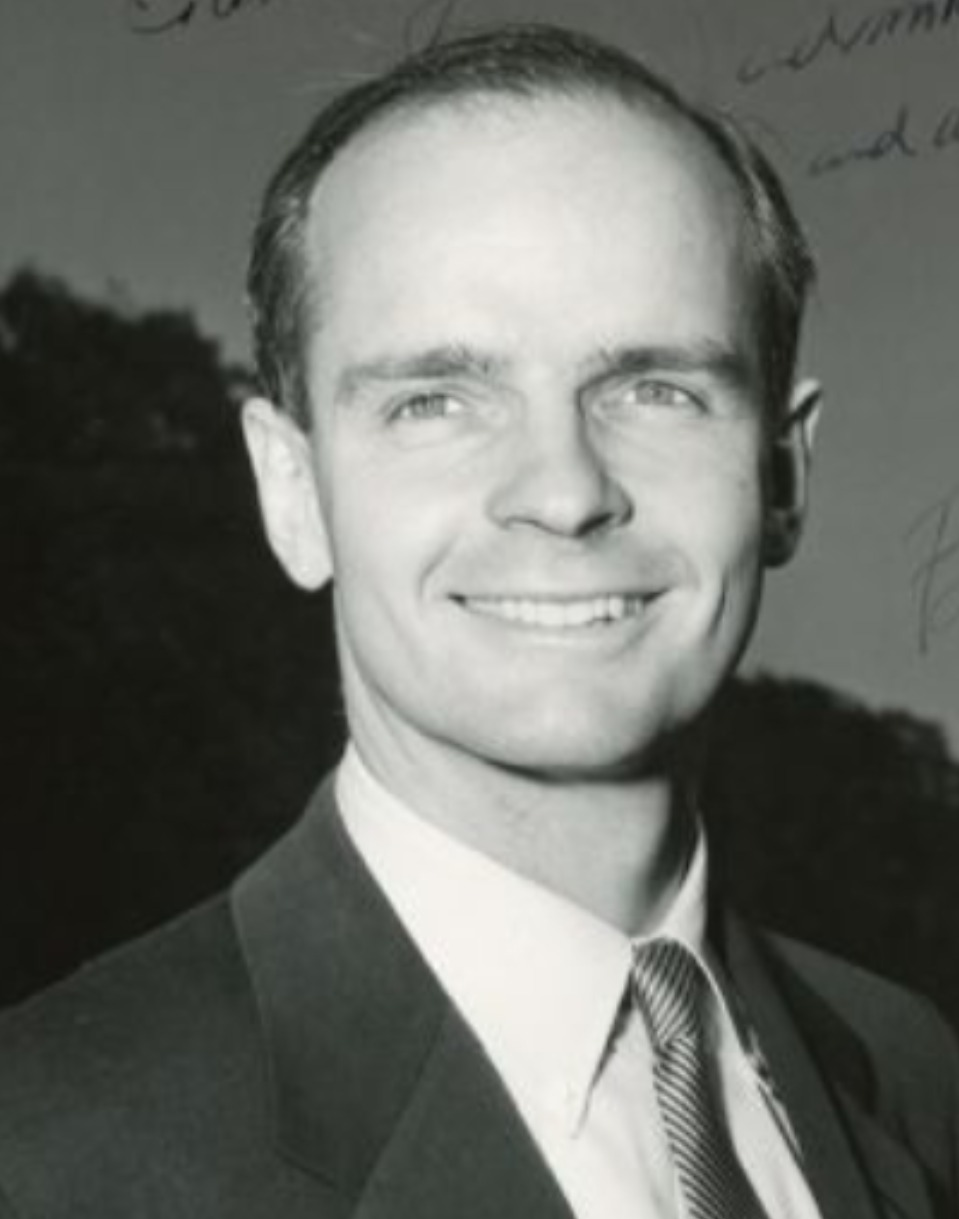
Nominee	Walter J. Kohler Jr.	William Proxmire
Party	Republican	Democratic
Popular vote	1,009,171	601,844
Percentage	62.48%	37.26%
- County results Kohler: 50–60% 60–70% 70–80% 80–90% Proxmire: 50–60%
Governor before election
Walter J. Kohler Jr.
Republican
Elected Governor
Walter J. Kohler Jr.
Republican

The 1952 Wisconsin gubernatorial election was held on November 4, 1952.

Incumbent Republican Governor Walter J. Kohler Jr. defeated Democratic nominee William Proxmire with 62.50% of the vote. Kohler's share of the vote was the highest by a gubernatorial candidate since Philip La Follette in 1930; no candidate would match Kohler's share until Tommy Thompson in 1994.

== Primary election ==
Primary elections were held on September 9, 1952.

=== Republican party ===
==== Candidates ====
- Walter J. Kohler Jr., incumbent Governor

==== Results ====
Republican primary results
Party	Candidate	Votes	%
Republican	Walter J. Kohler Jr. (incumbent)	699,082	100.00%
Total votes		699,082	100.00%

=== Democratic party ===
==== Candidates ====
- William Proxmire, member of the Wisconsin State Assembly

==== Results ====
Democratic primary results
Party	Candidate	Votes	%
Democratic	William Proxmire	178,133	100.00%
Total votes		178,133	100.00%

== General election ==
=== Candidates ===
- William Proxmire, Democratic
- Walter J. Kohler Jr., Republican
- M. Michael Essin, Independent

=== Results ===
1952 Wisconsin gubernatorial election
Party	Candidate	Votes	%	±%
Republican	Walter J. Kohler Jr. (incumbent)	1,009,171	62.48%	+9.27%
Democratic	William Proxmire	601,844	37.27%	−8.89%
Independent	M. Michael Essin	3,706	0.23%	−0.10%
	Scattering (Note: These are not listed in the Blue Book but are listed in the Board of Canvassers report.)	493	0.03%	
Majority		407,327	25.22%	
Total votes		1,615,214	100.00%	
Republican hold		Swing	+18.16%	

=== Results by county ===
After this election, Douglas County and Kenosha County would not vote Republican again until 1990.

County	Walter J. Kohler Jr. Republican		William Proxmire Democratic		M. Michael Essin Independent		Scattering Write-in		Margin		Total votes cast
County	#	%	#	%	#	%	#	%	#	%	Total votes cast
Adams	2,438	71.60%	955	28.05%	12	0.35%	0	0.00%	1,483	43.55%	3,405
Ashland	4,732	58.29%	3,340	41.14%	46	0.57%	0	0.00%	1,392	17.15%	8,118
Barron	10,673	72.64%	3,954	26.91%	65	0.44%	0	0.00%	6,719	45.73%	14,692
Bayfield	3,808	63.27%	2,163	35.94%	48	0.80%	0	0.00%	1,645	27.33%	6,019
Brown	30,913	69.66%	13,429	30.26%	31	0.07%	1	0.00%	17,484	39.40%	44,374
Buffalo	4,397	74.11%	1,518	25.59%	18	0.30%	0	0.00%	2,879	48.53%	5,933
Burnett	2,869	66.88%	1,409	32.84%	12	0.28%	0	0.00%	1,460	34.03%	4,290
Calumet	7,195	80.52%	1,730	19.36%	11	0.12%	0	0.00%	5,465	61.16%	8,936
Chippewa	12,443	69.69%	5,382	30.14%	30	0.17%	0	0.00%	7,061	39.55%	17,855
Clark	10,091	76.37%	3,074	23.26%	48	0.36%	0	0.00%	7,017	53.11%	13,213
Columbia	11,798	71.44%	4,706	28.50%	10	0.06%	0	0.00%	7,092	42.95%	16,514
Crawford	5,455	72.12%	2,105	27.83%	4	0.05%	0	0.00%	3,350	44.29%	7,564
Dane	40,167	50.81%	38,699	48.95%	182	0.23%	9	0.01%	1,468	1.86%	79,057
Dodge	19,692	74.30%	6,788	25.61%	22	0.08%	2	0.01%	12,904	48.69%	26,504
Door	7,967	84.17%	1,484	15.68%	14	0.15%	0	0.00%	6,483	68.49%	9,465
Douglas	10,789	52.03%	9,854	47.52%	92	0.44%	0	0.00%	935	4.51%	20,735
Dunn	8,023	73.54%	2,873	26.34%	13	0.12%	0	0.00%	5,150	47.21%	10,909
Eau Claire	14,967	62.56%	8,916	37.27%	40	0.17%	0	0.00%	6,051	25.29%	23,923
Florence	1,247	67.51%	594	32.16%	6	0.32%	0	0.00%	653	35.35%	1,847
Fond du Lac	23,788	76.25%	7,343	23.54%	67	0.21%	0	0.00%	16,445	52.71%	31,198
Forest	2,050	55.66%	1,624	44.09%	9	0.24%	0	0.00%	426	11.57%	3,683
Grant	14,976	81.67%	3,339	18.21%	22	0.12%	0	0.00%	11,637	63.46%	18,337
Green	8,640	77.44%	2,512	22.52%	5	0.04%	0	0.00%	6,128	54.93%	11,157
Green Lake	6,497	82.54%	1,364	17.33%	10	0.13%	0	0.00%	5,133	65.21%	7,871
Iowa	6,603	74.12%	2,298	25.79%	8	0.09%	0	0.00%	4,305	48.32%	8,909
Iron	1,809	42.24%	2,456	57.34%	18	0.42%	0	0.00%	-647	-15.11%	4,283
Jackson	4,231	61.56%	2,633	38.31%	5	0.07%	4	0.06%	1,598	23.25%	6,873
Jefferson	14,031	67.60%	6,713	32.34%	11	0.05%	0	0.00%	7,318	35.26%	20,755
Juneau	6,314	77.26%	1,852	22.66%	6	0.07%	0	0.00%	4,462	54.60%	8,172
Kenosha	20,194	51.27%	19,100	48.49%	92	0.23%	0	0.00%	1,094	2.78%	39,386
Kewaunee	6,763	80.68%	1,610	19.21%	9	0.11%	0	0.00%	5,153	61.48%	8,382
La Crosse	20,147	63.80%	11,369	36.00%	64	0.20%	0	0.00%	8,778	27.80%	31,580
Lafayette	6,141	71.63%	2,427	28.31%	4	0.05%	1	0.01%	3,714	43.32%	8,573
Langlade	6,549	71.10%	2,636	28.62%	26	0.28%	0	0.00%	3,913	42.48%	9,211
Lincoln	7,165	71.88%	2,784	27.93%	19	0.19%	0	0.00%	4,381	43.95%	9,968
Manitowoc	19,383	62.56%	11,563	37.32%	36	0.12%	2	0.01%	7,820	25.24%	30,984
Marathon	22,178	61.97%	13,313	37.20%	295	0.82%	3	0.01%	8,865	24.77%	35,789
Marinette	10,263	66.89%	5,058	32.96%	23	0.15%	0	0.00%	5,205	33.92%	15,344
Marquette	3,484	83.27%	695	16.61%	5	0.12%	0	0.00%	2,789	66.66%	4,184
Milwaukee	209,887	48.68%	219,550	50.92%	1,283	0.30%	449	0.10%	-9,663	-2.24%	431,169
Monroe	9,443	76.41%	2,906	23.51%	8	0.06%	2	0.02%	6,537	52.89%	12,359
Oconto	8,205	73.81%	2,883	25.94%	28	0.25%	0	0.00%	5,322	47.88%	11,116
Oneida	6,504	64.86%	3,508	34.99%	15	0.15%	0	0.00%	2,996	29.88%	10,027
Outagamie	28,074	77.30%	8,172	22.50%	73	0.20%	0	0.00%	19,902	54.80%	36,319
Ozaukee	8,522	66.03%	4,372	33.88%	12	0.09%	0	0.00%	4,150	32.16%	12,906
Pepin	2,383	76.13%	741	23.67%	6	0.19%	0	0.00%	1,642	52.46%	3,130
Pierce	7,446	76.44%	2,275	23.35%	20	0.21%	0	0.00%	5,171	53.08%	9,741
Polk	7,761	69.39%	3,406	30.45%	18	0.16%	0	0.00%	4,355	38.94%	11,185
Portage	9,220	57.79%	6,714	42.08%	20	0.13%	1	0.01%	2,506	15.71%	15,955
Price	4,928	67.24%	2,352	32.09%	49	0.67%	0	0.00%	2,576	35.15%	7,329
Racine	31,456	55.61%	24,999	44.20%	102	0.18%	6	0.01%	6,457	11.42%	56,563
Richland	6,904	77.45%	2,006	22.50%	4	0.04%	0	0.00%	4,898	54.95%	8,914
Rock	28,891	66.93%	14,231	32.97%	41	0.09%	3	0.01%	14,660	33.96%	43,166
Rusk	4,718	68.21%	2,173	31.42%	26	0.38%	0	0.00%	2,545	36.79%	6,917
Sauk	12,811	73.16%	4,677	26.71%	19	0.11%	3	0.02%	8,134	46.45%	17,510
Sawyer	3,369	72.62%	1,257	27.10%	12	0.26%	1	0.02%	2,112	45.53%	4,639
Shawano	11,800	81.42%	2,670	18.42%	22	0.15%	0	0.00%	9,130	63.00%	14,492
Sheboygan	24,174	63.18%	13,936	36.42%	151	0.39%	0	0.00%	10,238	26.76%	38,261
St. Croix	8,296	67.60%	3,962	32.28%	14	0.11%	0	0.00%	4,334	35.32%	12,272
Taylor	5,448	71.97%	2,100	27.74%	19	0.25%	3	0.04%	3,348	44.23%	7,570
Trempealeau	6,895	68.34%	3,189	31.61%	5	0.05%	0	0.00%	3,706	36.73%	10,089
Vernon	8,186	71.15%	3,302	28.70%	18	0.16%	0	0.00%	4,884	42.45%	11,506
Vilas	3,892	75.30%	1,270	24.57%	7	0.14%	0	0.00%	2,622	50.73%	5,169
Walworth	17,619	78.79%	4,698	21.01%	45	0.20%	0	0.00%	12,921	57.78%	22,362
Washburn	3,496	68.19%	1,619	31.58%	12	0.23%	0	0.00%	1,877	36.61%	5,127
Washington	12,361	71.82%	4,834	28.09%	17	0.10%	0	0.00%	7,527	43.73%	17,212
Waukesha	29,770	64.26%	16,472	35.55%	87	0.19%	1	0.00%	13,298	28.70%	46,330
Waupaca	14,524	85.36%	2,479	14.57%	12	0.07%	0	0.00%	12,045	70.79%	17,015
Waushara	5,696	83.30%	1,128	16.50%	12	0.18%	2	0.03%	4,568	66.80%	6,838
Winnebago	29,807	70.94%	12,137	28.88%	75	0.18%	0	0.00%	17,670	42.05%	42,019
Wood	15,815	71.84%	6,164	28.00%	36	0.16%	0	0.00%	9,651	43.84%	22,015
Total	1,009,171	62.48%	601,844	37.26%	3,706	0.23%	493	0.03%	407,327	25.22%	1,615,214

==== Counties that flipped from Democratic to Republican ====
- Burnett
- Dane
- Douglas
- Eau Claire
- Forest
- Jackson
- Kenosha
- La Crosse
- Portage
- Washburn

== Bibliography ==
- Gubernatorial Elections, 1787-1997. Washington, D.C.: Congressional Quarterly Inc. 1998. ISBN 1-56802-396-0.
- Toepel, M. J.; Kuehn, Hazel L., eds. (1954). The Wisconsin Blue Book, 1954. State of Wisconsin.
