= 1982 United States gubernatorial elections =

- November 2, 1982

38 governorships 36 states; 2 territories
	Majority party	Minority party
Party	Democratic	Republican
Seats before	27	23
Seats after	34	16
Seat change	▲7	▼7
Seats up	20	16
Seats won	27	9
- Republican hold Republican gain Democratic hold Democratic gain

United States gubernatorial elections were held on November 2, 1982, in 36 states and two territories. The Democratic party had a net gain of seven seats. This election coincided with the Senate and the House elections. As of 2026, this remains the last election cycle in which a Republican won the governorship of Oregon.

== Election results ==
=== States ===
State	Incumbent	Party	First elected	Result	Candidates
Alabama	Fob James	Democratic	1978	Incumbent retired. New governor elected. Democratic hold.	✓ George Wallace (Democratic) 57.6%; Emory Folmar (Republican) 39.1%; Leo Suiter (Alabama Conservative) 1.6%; Henry Klingler (Libertarian) 0.7%; John Jackson (Alabama Nat'l Democrat) 0.4%; John Dyer (Prohibition) 0.4%; Martin J. Boyers (Socialist Workers) 0.2%
Alaska	Jay Hammond	Republican	1974	Incumbent term-limited. New governor elected. Democratic gain.	✓ Bill Sheffield (Democratic) 46.1%; Tom Fink (Republican) 37.1%; Dick Randolph (Libertarian) 14.9%; Joe Vogler (Alaskan Ind.) 1.7%
Arizona	Bruce Babbitt	Democratic	1978 (Note: Babbitt took office after his predecessor (Wesley Bolin) died.)	Incumbent re-elected.	✓ Bruce Babbitt (Democratic) 62.5%; Leo Corbet (Republican) 32.5%; Sam Steiger (Libertarian) 5.0%
Arkansas	Frank D. White	Republican	1980	Incumbent lost re-election. New governor elected. Democratic gain.	✓ Bill Clinton (Democratic) 54.7%; Frank D. White (Republican) 45.3%
California	Jerry Brown	Democratic	1974	Incumbent retired. New governor elected. Republican gain.	✓ George Deukmejian (R) 49.3%; Tom Bradley (D) 48.1%; Don P. Dougherty (L) 1.0%; Elizabeth Martinez (PF) 0.9%; James C. Griffin (AI) 0.7%
Colorado	Richard Lamm	Democratic	1974	Incumbent re-elected.	✓ Richard Lamm (Democratic) 65.7%; John Fuhr (Republican) 31.2%; Paul K. Grant (Libertarian) 2.0%; Earl Dodge (Prohibition) 0.4%; Alan Gummerson (Socialist Workers) 0.3%
Connecticut	William A. O'Neill	Democratic	1980 (Note: O'Neill took office after his predecessor (Ella Grasso) resigned.)	Incumbent elected to full term.	✓ William A. O'Neill (Democratic) 53.7%; Lewis B. Rome (Republican) 46.3%
Florida	Bob Graham	Democratic	1978	Incumbent re-elected.	✓ Bob Graham (Democratic) 64.7%; Skip Bafalis (Republican) 35.3%
Georgia	George Busbee	Democratic	1974	Incumbent term-limited. New governor elected. Democratic hold.	✓ Joe Frank Harris (Democratic) 62.8%; Robert H. Bell (Republican) 37.2%
Hawaii	George Ariyoshi	Democratic	1974	Incumbent re-elected.	✓ George Ariyoshi (Democratic) 45.2%; Frank Fasi (Independent Democrat) 28.6%; D. G. Anderson (Republican) 26.1%
Idaho	John Evans	Democratic	1977 (Note: Evans took office after his predecessor (Cecil Andrus) resigned.)	Incumbent re-elected.	✓ John Evans (Democratic) 52.9%; Phil Batt (Republican) 47.1%
Illinois	James R. Thompson	Republican	1976	Incumbent re-elected.	✓ James R. Thompson (Republican) 49.44%; Adlai Stevenson III (Democratic) 49.30%; Bea Armstrong (Libertarian) 0.67%; John E. Roche (U.S. Taxpayers) 0.60%
Iowa	Robert D. Ray	Republican	1968	Incumbent retired. New governor elected. Republican hold.	✓ Terry Branstad (Republican) 52.8%; Roxanne Conlin (Democratic) 46.6%; Marcia Farrington (Libertarian) 0.3%; Jim Bittner (Socialist) 0.3%
Kansas	John W. Carlin	Democratic	1976	Incumbent re-elected.	✓ John W. Carlin (Democratic) 53.2%; Sam Hardage (Republican) 44.5%; James H. Ward (Libertarian) 1.0%; Frank Shelton (American) 0.8%; Warren C. Martin (Prohibition) 0.6%
Maine	Joseph E. Brennan	Democratic	1978	Incumbent re-elected.	✓ Joseph E. Brennan (Democratic) 61.9%; Charles R. Cragin (Republican) 38.1%; Venn Warren (Independent) 0.6%; J. Martin "Marty" Vachon (Independent) 0.6%
Maryland	Harry Hughes	Democratic	1978	Incumbent re-elected.	✓ Harry Hughes (Democratic) 62.0%; Robert A. Pascal (Republican) 38.0%
Massachusetts	Edward J. King	Democratic	1978	Incumbent lost re-nomination. New governor elected. Democratic hold.	✓ Michael Dukakis (Democratic) 59.5%; John W. Sears (Republican) 36.6%; Frank Rich (Independent) 3.1%; Rebecca Shipman (Libertarian) 0.9%
Michigan	William Milliken	Republican	1969 (Note: Milliken took office after his predecessor (George W. Romney) resigned.)	Incumbent retired. New governor elected. Democratic gain.	✓ James Blanchard (Democratic) 51.4%; Richard Headlee (Republican) 45.1%; Robert Tisch (Tisch Ind. Citizens) 2.6%; Dick Jacobs (Libertarian) 0.5%; James Phillips (American Ind.) 0.2%; Leslie E. Craine (Socialist Workers) 0.1%; Martin P. McLaughlin (Workers League) 0.1%
Minnesota	Al Quie	Republican	1978	Incumbent retired. New governor elected. Democratic gain.	✓ Rudy Perpich (Democratic) 58.6%; Wheelock Whitney (Republican) 40.0%; Kathy Wheeler (Socialist Workers) 0.6%; Tom McDonald (Honest Government) 0.5%; Franklin H. Haws (Libertarian) 0.4%
Nebraska	Charles Thone	Republican	1978	Incumbent lost re-election. New governor elected. Democratic gain.	✓ Bob Kerrey (Democratic) 50.7%; Charles Thone (Republican) 49.3%
Nevada	Robert List	Republican	1978	Incumbent lost re-election. New governor elected. Democratic gain.	✓ Richard Bryan (Democratic) 53.4%; Robert List (Republican) 41.8%; None of These Candidates 2.9%; Dan Becan (Libertarian) 1.9%
New Hampshire	Hugh Gallen	Democratic	1978	Incumbent lost re-election. New governor elected. Republican gain.	✓ John H. Sununu (Republican) 51.5%; Hugh Gallen (Democratic) 46.8%; Meldrim Thomson Jr. (Independent) 1.7%
New Mexico	Bruce King	Democratic	1970; 1974 (term-limited); 1978	Incumbent term-limited. New governor elected. Democratic hold.	✓ Toney Anaya (Democratic) 53.0%; John B. Irick (Republican) 47.0%
New York	Hugh Carey	Democratic	1974	Incumbent retired. New governor elected. Democratic hold.	✓ Mario Cuomo (Democratic) 50.9%; Lewis Lehrman (Republican) 47.5%; Robert J. Bohner (Right to Life) 1.0%; John H. Northrup (Libertarian) 0.3%; Jane Benedict (Unity) 0.1%; Nancy Ross (New Alliance) 0.1%; Diane Wang (Socialist Workers) 0.1%
Ohio	Jim Rhodes	Republican	1962; 1970 (term-limited); 1974	Incumbent term-limited. New governor elected. Democratic gain.	✓ Dick Celeste (Democratic) 59.0%; Bud Brown (Republican) 38.9%; Phyllis Goetz (Libertarian) 1.2%; Kurt O. Landefiled (Independent) 0.5%; Erwin Reupert (Independent) 0.4%
Oklahoma	George Nigh	Democratic	1978	Incumbent re-elected.	✓ George Nigh (Democratic) 62.1%; Tom Daxon (Republican) 37.6%; Allah-U Akbar Allah-U Wahid (Independent) 0.3%
Oregon	Victor Atiyeh	Republican	1978	Incumbent re-elected.	✓ Victor Atiyeh (Republican) 63.1%; Ted Kulongoski (Democratic) 36.9%
Pennsylvania	Dick Thornburgh	Republican	1978	Incumbent re-elected.	✓ Dick Thornburgh (Republican) 50.8%; Allen E. Ertel (Democratic) 48.1%; Mark Zola (Socialist Workers) 0.4%; Lee Frissell (Consumer) 0.4%; Richard D. Fuerle (Libertarian) 0.3%
Rhode Island	J. Joseph Garrahy	Democratic	1976	Incumbent re-elected.	✓ J. Joseph Garrahy (Democratic) 73.3%; Vincent Marzullo (Republican) 23.6%; Hilary R. Salk (Independent) 2.1%; Peter Van Daam (Independent) 1.0%
South Carolina	Richard Riley	Democratic	1978	Incumbent re-elected.	✓ Richard Riley (Democratic) 69.8%; W. D. Workman Jr. (Republican) 30.2%
South Dakota	Bill Janklow	Republican	1978	Incumbent re-elected.	✓ Bill Janklow (Republican) 70.9%; Michael J. O'Connor (Democratic) 29.1%
Tennessee	Lamar Alexander	Republican	1978	Incumbent re-elected.	✓ Lamar Alexander (Republican) 59.6%; Randy Tyree (Democratic) 40.4%
Texas	Bill Clements	Republican	1978	Incumbent lost re-election. New governor elected. Democratic gain.	✓ Mark White (Democratic) 53.2%; Bill Clements (Republican) 45.9%; David Hutzelman (Libertarian) 0.6%; Bob Poteet (U.S. Taxpayers) 0.3%
Vermont	Richard A. Snelling	Republican	1976	Incumbent re-elected.	✓ Richard A. Snelling (Republican) 55.0%; Madeleine Kunin (Democratic) 44.0%; Richard Gottlieb (Liberty Union) 0.5%; John L. Buttolph III (Libertarian) 0.5%
Wisconsin	Lee S. Dreyfus	Republican	1978	Incumbent retired. New governor elected. Democratic gain.	✓ Tony Earl (Democratic) 56.8%; Terry Kohler (Republican) 42.0%; Larry Smiley (Libertarian) 0.6%; James Wickstrom (U.S. Taxpayers) 0.5%; Peter Seidman (Socialist Workers) 0.2%
Wyoming	Edgar Herschler	Democratic	1974	Incumbent re-elected.	✓ Edgar Herschler (Democratic) 63.1%; Warren A. Morton (Republican) 36.9%

=== Territories and federal district ===
Territory	Incumbent	Party	First elected	Result	Candidates
District of Columbia	Marion Barry	Democratic	1978	Incumbent re-elected.	✓ Marion Barry (Democratic) 81.0%; E. Brooke Lee Jr. (Republican) 14.1%; Dennis S. Sobin (Independent) 2.3%; Glenn B. White (Socialist Workers) 1.3%
Guam	Paul M. Calvo	Republican	1978	Incumbent lost re-election. New governor elected. Democratic gain.	✓ Ricardo Bordallo (Democratic) 52.4%; Paul McDonald Calvo (Republican) 47.6%
U.S. Virgin Islands	Juan Francisco Luis	Independent	1978 (Note: Luis took office after his predecessor (Cyril E. King) died. He was subsequently elected in the 1978 United States Virgin Islands gubernatorial election.)	Incumbent re-elected.	✓ Juan Francisco Luis (Independent) 100%

== Close states ==
States where the margin of victory was under 1%:

1. Illinois, 0.14%

States where the margin of victory was under 5%:

1. California, 1.2%
2. Nebraska, 1.4%
3. New York, 2.4%
4. Pennsylvania, 2.7%
5. New Hampshire, 4.7%
6. Guam, 4.8%

States where the margin of victory was under 10%:

1. Idaho, 5.8%
2. New Mexico, 6.0%
3. Iowa, 6.2%
4. Michigan, 6.3%
5. Texas, 7.3%
6. Connecticut, 7.4%
7. Kansas, 8.7%
8. Alaska, 9.0%
9. Arkansas, 9.4%

== Alabama ==
1982 Alabama gubernatorial election
- November 2, 1982
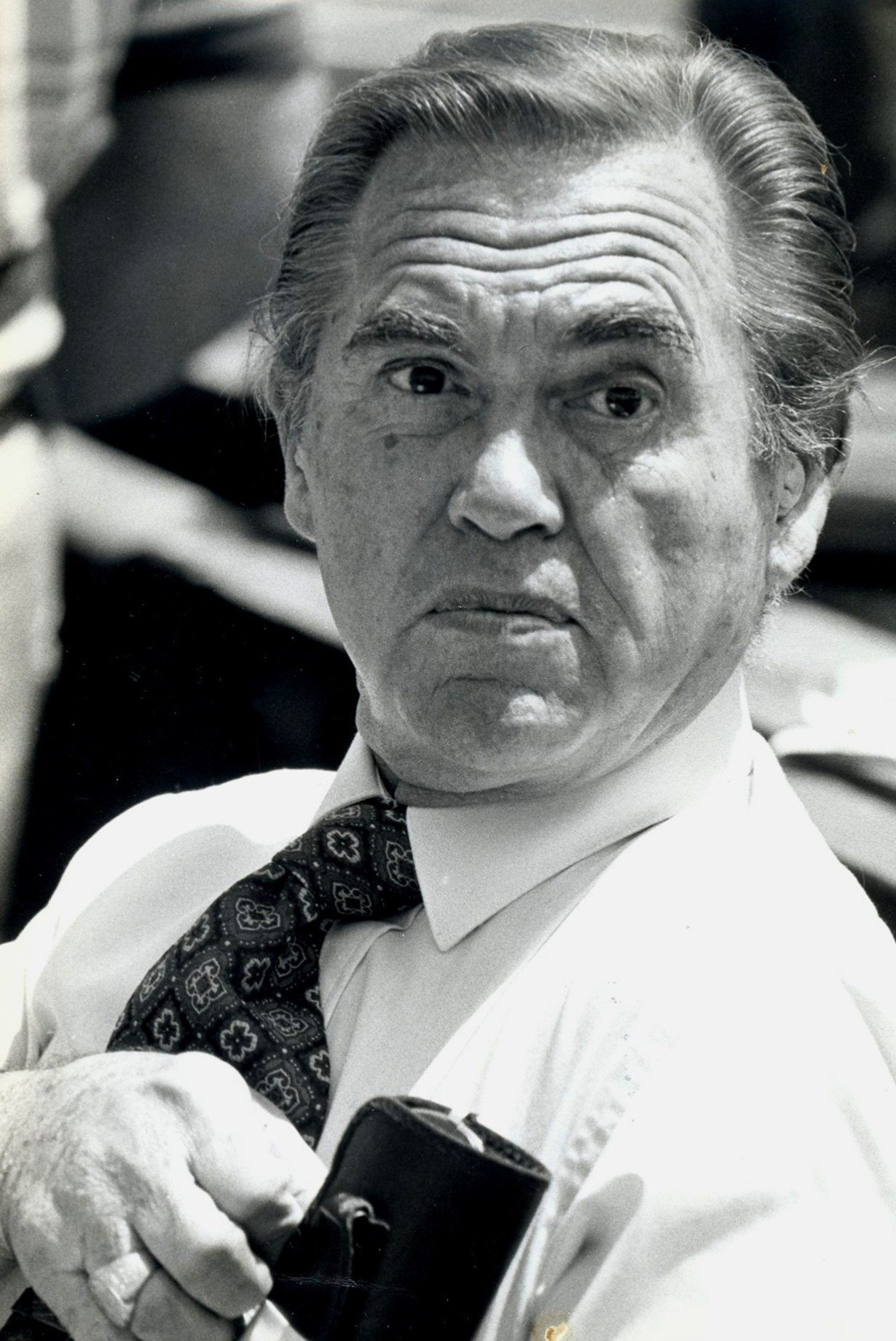

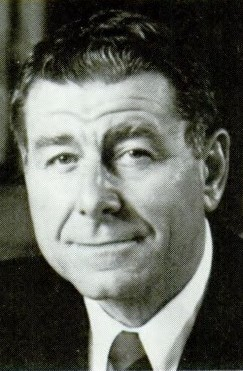
Nominee	George Wallace	Emory Folmar
Party	Democratic	Republican
Popular vote	650,538	440,815
Percentage	57.6%	39.1%
- County results Wallace: 40–50% 50–60% 60–70% 70–80% 80–90% Folmar: 40–50% 50–60%
Governor before election
Fob James
Democratic
Elected Governor
George Wallace
Democratic

The 1982 Alabama gubernatorial election was held on November 2, 1982, to elect the governor of Alabama. Incumbent Democrat Fob James declined to run for re-election; he later successfully ran again in 1994 as a Republican. The open seat election saw former Democratic governor George Wallace, who narrowly won the Democratic primary, defeat Republican Emory Folmar, the Mayor of Montgomery, Alabama.

== Alaska ==
1982 Alaska gubernatorial election
- November 2, 1982
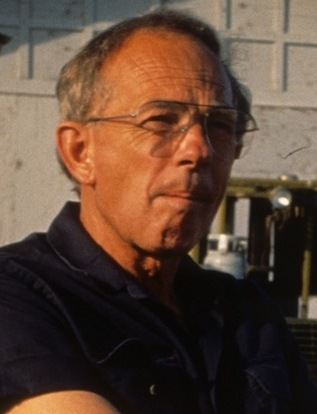

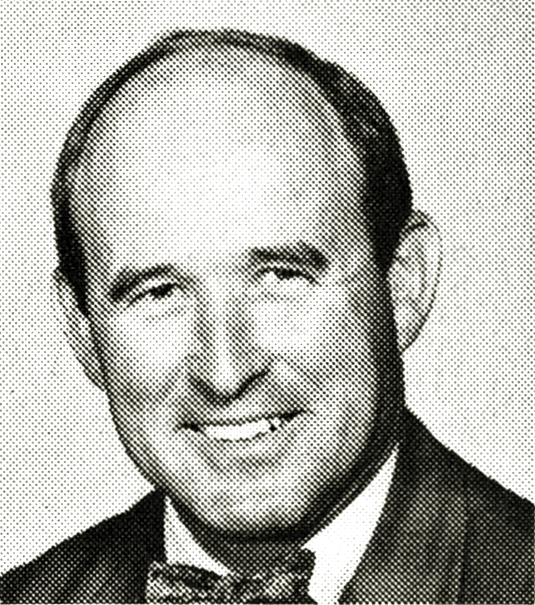

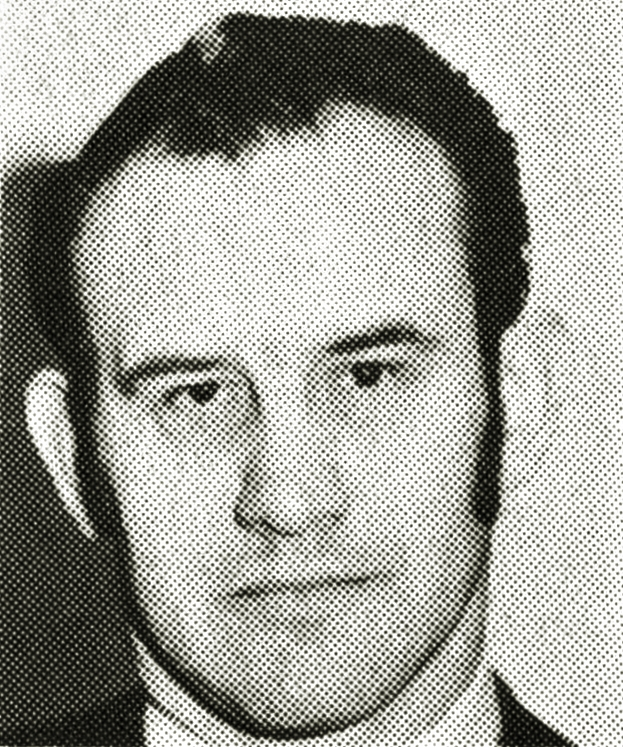
Nominee	Bill Sheffield	Tom Fink	Dick Randolph
Party	Democratic	Republican	Libertarian
Running mate	Steve McAlpine	Mike Colletta	Donnis Thompson
Popular vote	89,918	72,291	29,067
Percentage	46.12%	37.09%	14.91%
- Results by state house district Sheffield: 30–40% 40–50% 50–60% 60–70% 70–80% 80–90% Fink: 30–40% 40–50% 50–60% 60–70%
Governor before election
Jay Hammond
Republican
Elected Governor
Bill Sheffield
Democratic

The 1982 Alaska gubernatorial election took place on November 2, 1982, for the post of Governor of Alaska. To replace outgoing Republican governor Jay Hammond, Democratic nominee Bill Sheffield defeated three opponents: Republican nominee Tom Fink, Libertarian nominee Dick Randolph and Alaskan Independence Party nominee Joe Vogler. Hammond had endorsed his lieutenant governor, Terry Miller, who lost the Republican nomination to Fink in the primary election, as did Don Wright. Sheffield defeated Steve Cowper and former Lieutenant Governor H. A. Boucher for the Democratic nomination.

== Arizona ==
1982 Arizona gubernatorial election
- November 2, 1982
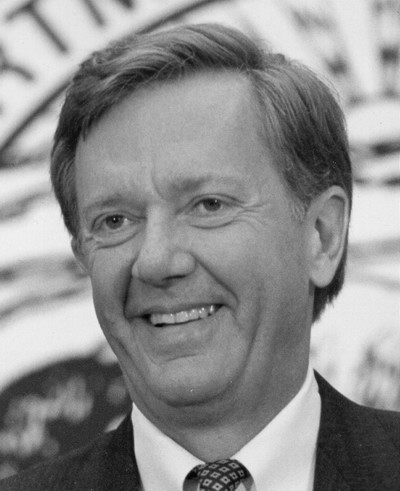

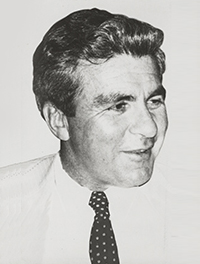
Nominee	Bruce Babbitt	Leo Corbet	Sam Steiger
Party	Democratic	Republican	Libertarian
Popular vote	453,795	235,877	36,649
Percentage	62.5%	32.5%	5.1%
- County results Babbitt: 50–60% 60–70% 70–80%
Governor before election
Bruce Babbitt
Democratic
Elected Governor
Bruce Babbitt
Democratic

The 1982 Arizona gubernatorial election took place on November 2, 1982, for the post of Governor of Arizona. Democratic incumbent Bruce Babbitt defeated Republican nominee Leo Corbet and Libertarian candidate and former U.S. Representative Sam Steiger. Evan Mecham unsuccessfully ran for the Republican nomination. This was the last time until 2002 that a Democrat was elected governor of Arizona, and the last time a male Democrat was elected governor.

== Arkansas ==
1982 Arkansas gubernatorial election
- November 2, 1982
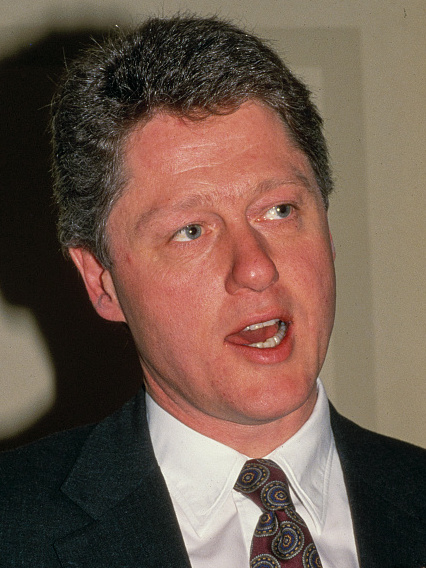

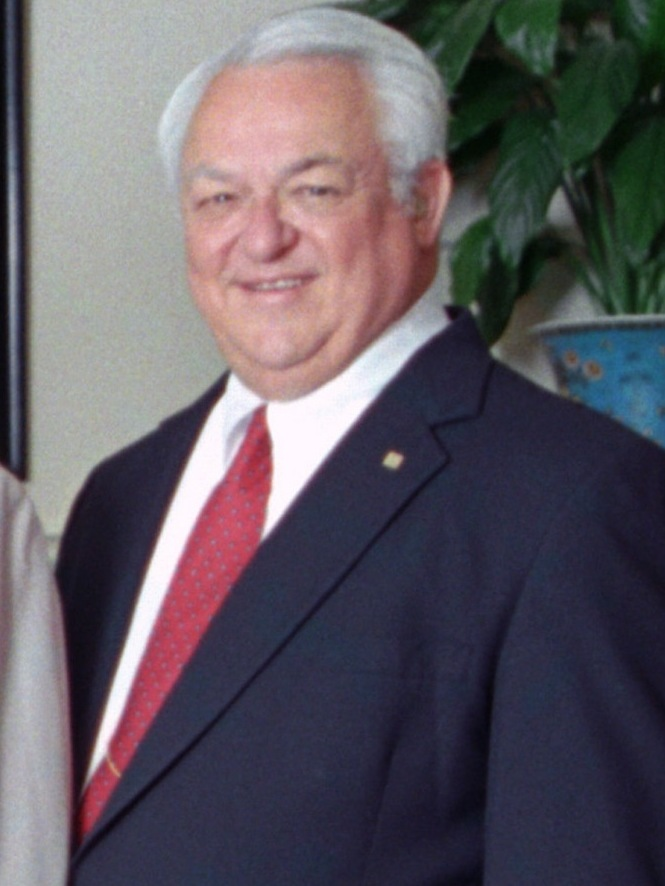
Nominee	Bill Clinton	Frank D. White
Party	Democratic	Republican
Popular vote	431,855	357,496
Percentage	54.71%	45.29%
- County results Clinton: 50–60% 60–70% 70–80% White: 50–60% 60–70%
Governor before election
Frank D. White
Republican
Elected Governor
Bill Clinton
Democratic

The 1982 Arkansas gubernatorial election was held on November 2, 1982. Former Democratic governor Bill Clinton regained the position after having narrowly been defeated by Republican candidate Frank D. White at the previous election. Clinton held the position from January 1983 until he resigned after being elected president in 1992. As of 2026, this is the last time that an incumbent governor of Arkansas lost re-election.

== California ==
1982 California gubernatorial election
- November 2, 1982
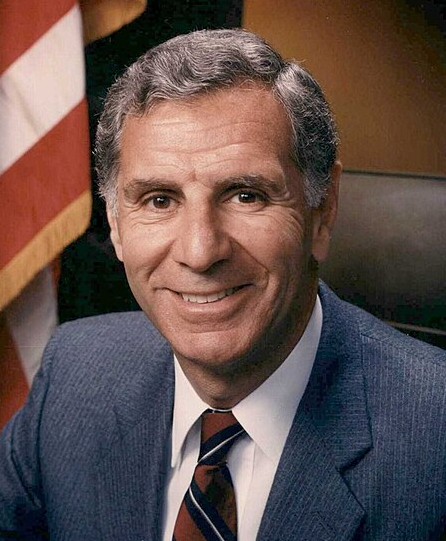

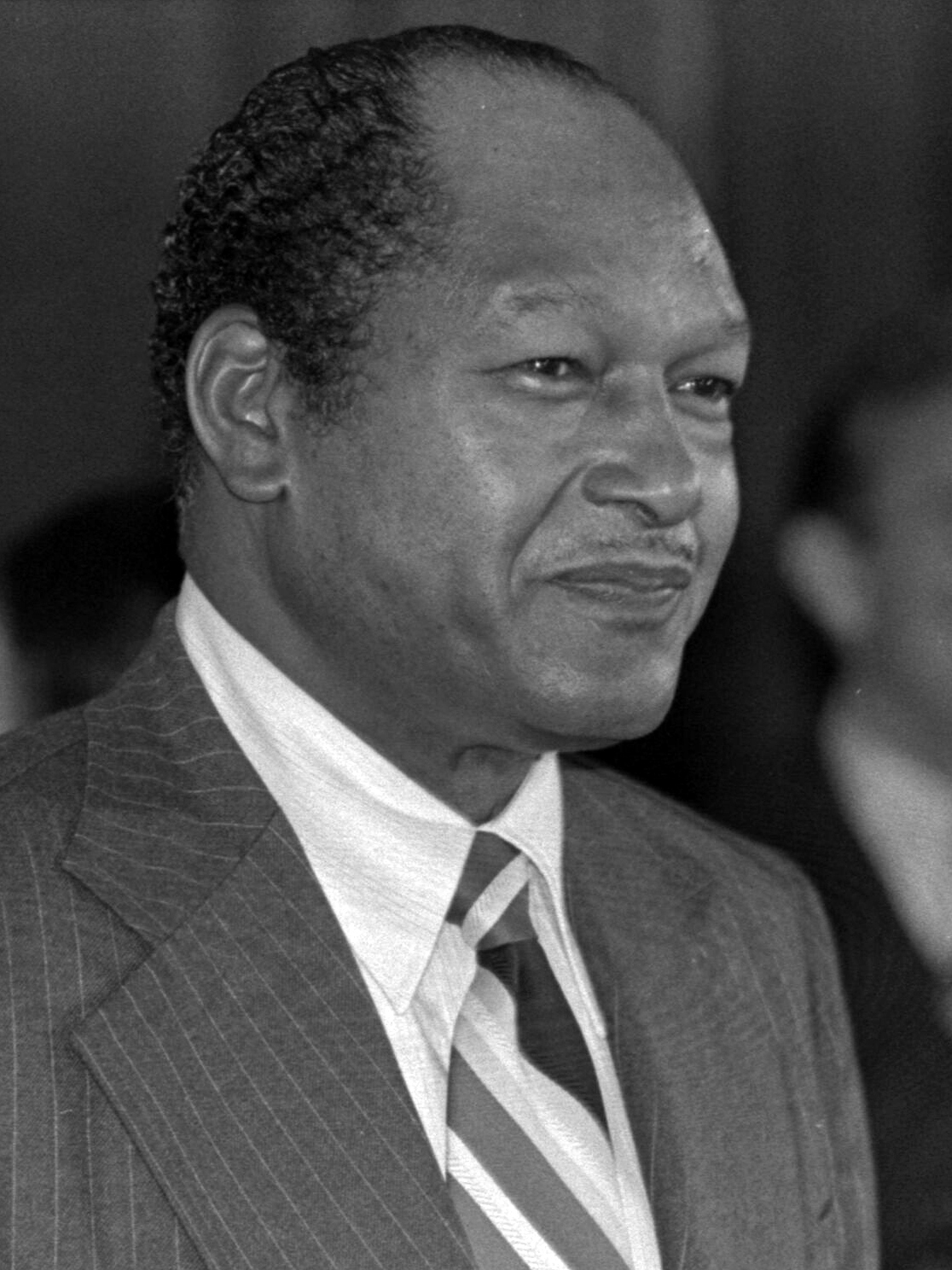
Nominee	George Deukmejian	Tom Bradley
Party	Republican	Democratic
Popular vote	3,881,014	3,787,669
Percentage	49.28%	48.09%
- County results Deukmejian: 40-50% 50-60% 60-70% Bradley: 40–50% 50–60% 60–70%
Governor before election
Jerry Brown
Democratic
Elected Governor
George Deukmejian
Republican

The 1982 California gubernatorial election occurred on November 2, 1982. The Republican nominee, Attorney General George Deukmejian, narrowly defeated the Democratic nominee, Los Angeles Mayor Tom Bradley. Incumbent Governor Jerry Brown did not seek reelection to a third consecutive term; he later successfully ran again in 2010 and 2014.

== Colorado ==
1982 Colorado gubernatorial election
- November 2, 1982
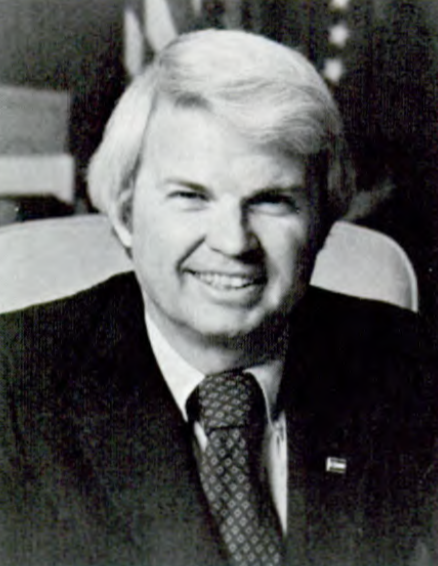

Nominee	Richard Lamm	John Fuhr
Party	Democratic	Republican
Running mate	Nancy Dick	Robert E. Denier
Popular vote	627,960	302,740
Percentage	65.69%	31.67%
- County results Lamm: 40–50% 50–60% 60–70% 70–80% 80–90% Fuhr: 40–50% 50–60%
Governor before election
Richard Lamm
Democratic
Elected Governor
Richard Lamm
Democratic

The 1982 Colorado gubernatorial election was held on November 2, 1982. Incumbent Democrat Richard Lamm defeated Republican nominee John Fuhr with 65.69% of the vote.

== Connecticut ==
1982 Connecticut gubernatorial election
- November 2, 1982

Nominee	Bill O'Neill	Lewis Rome
Party	Democratic	Republican
Running mate	Joseph J. Fauliso	Gerald Labriola
Popular vote	578,264	497,773
Percentage	53.35%	45.93%
- O'Neill: 40–50% 50–60% 60–70% 70–80% Rome: 40–50% 50–60% 60–70% 70–80%
Governor before election
Bill O'Neill
Democratic
Elected Governor
Bill O'Neill
Democratic

The 1982 Connecticut gubernatorial election took place on November 2, 1982. Incumbent Democratic governor Bill O'Neill had assumed the governor's office in 1980 after Ella Grasso resigned due to poor health. Grasso died just weeks later on February 5, 1981. Governor O'Neill defeated former Connecticut state senator Lewis Rome for his first full term in the governor's office.

== Florida ==
1982 Florida gubernatorial election
- November 2, 1982
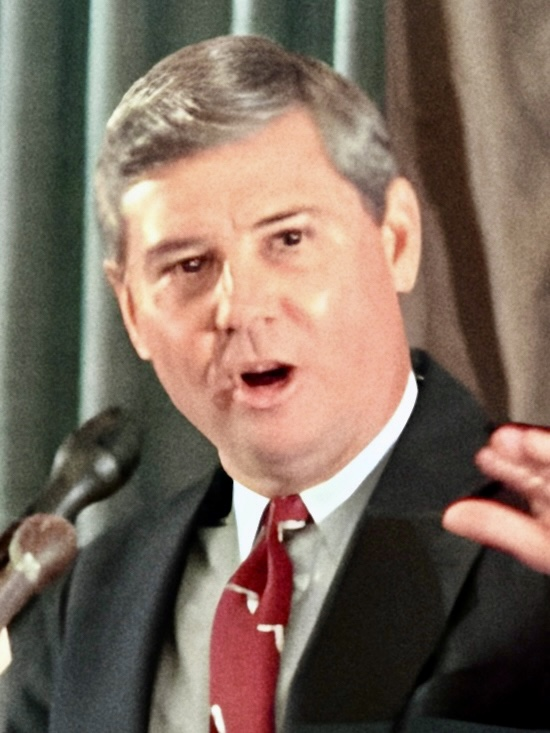

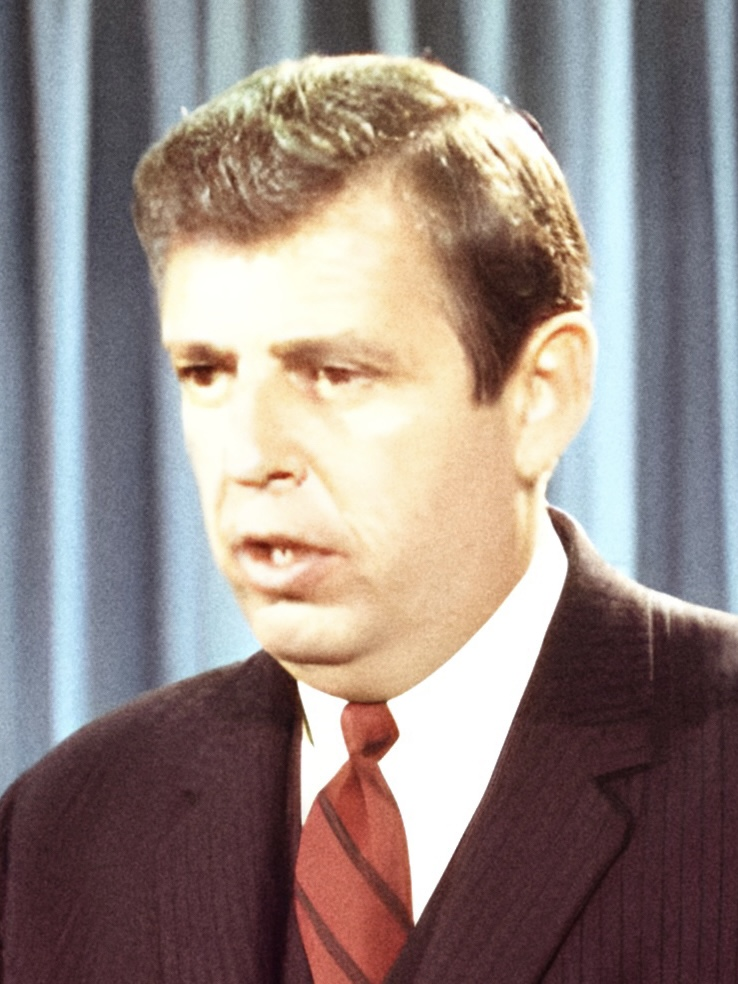
Nominee	Bob Graham	Skip Bafalis
Party	Democratic	Republican
Running mate	Wayne Mixson	Leo Callahan
Popular vote	1,739,553	949,013
Percentage	64.70%	35.30%
- County results Graham: 50–60% 60–70% 70–80% 80–90% Bafalis: 50–60%
Governor before election
Bob Graham
Democratic
Elected Governor
Bob Graham
Democratic

The 1982 Florida gubernatorial election was held on November 2, 1982. Incumbent Democratic governor Bob Graham was re-elected in a landslide, defeating Republican nominee Skip Bafalis with 64.70% of the vote.

== Georgia ==
1982 Georgia gubernatorial election
- November 2, 1982
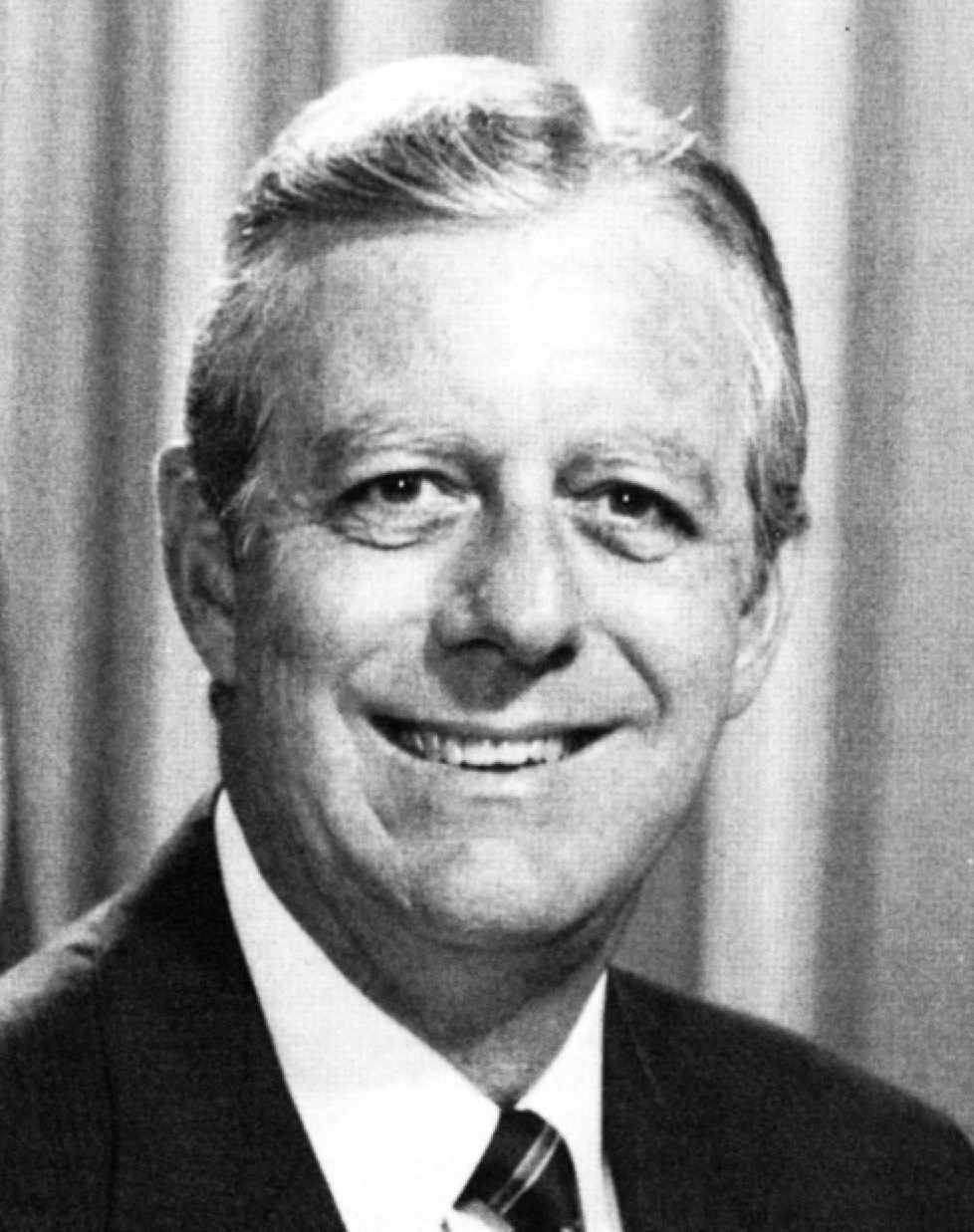

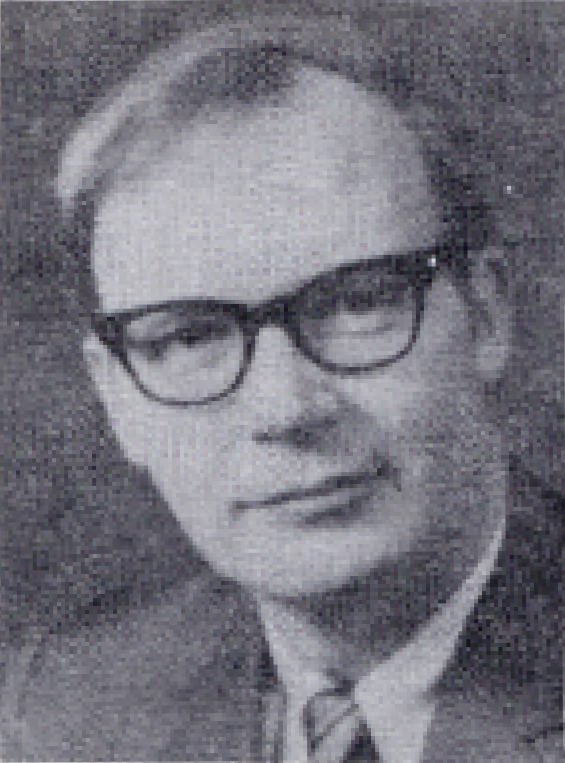
Nominee	Joe Frank Harris	Robert H. Bell
Party	Democratic	Republican
Popular vote	734,090	434,496
Percentage	62.82%	37.18%
- County results Harris: 50–60% 60–70% 70–80% 80–90% >90% Bell: 50–60%
Governor before election
George Busbee
Democratic
Elected Governor
Joe Frank Harris
Democratic

The 1982 Georgia gubernatorial election was held on November 2, 1982. Joe Frank Harris was elected as the 78th Governor of Georgia.

== Hawaii ==
1982 Hawaii gubernatorial election
- November 2, 1982
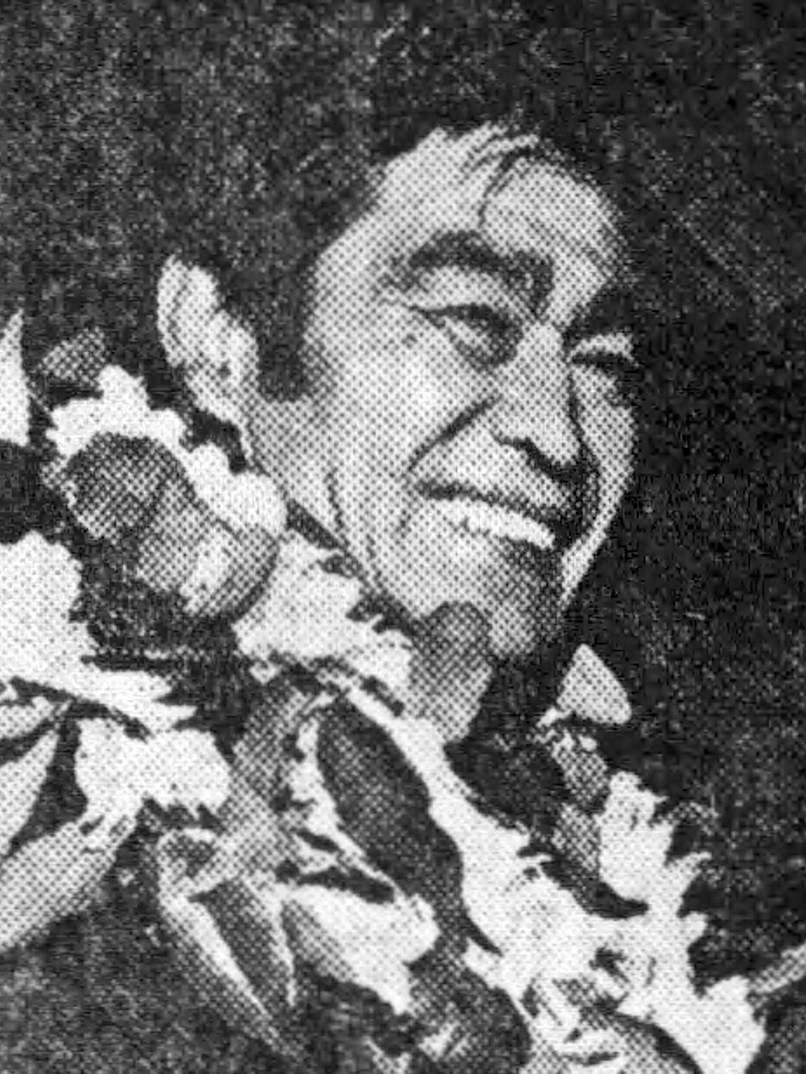

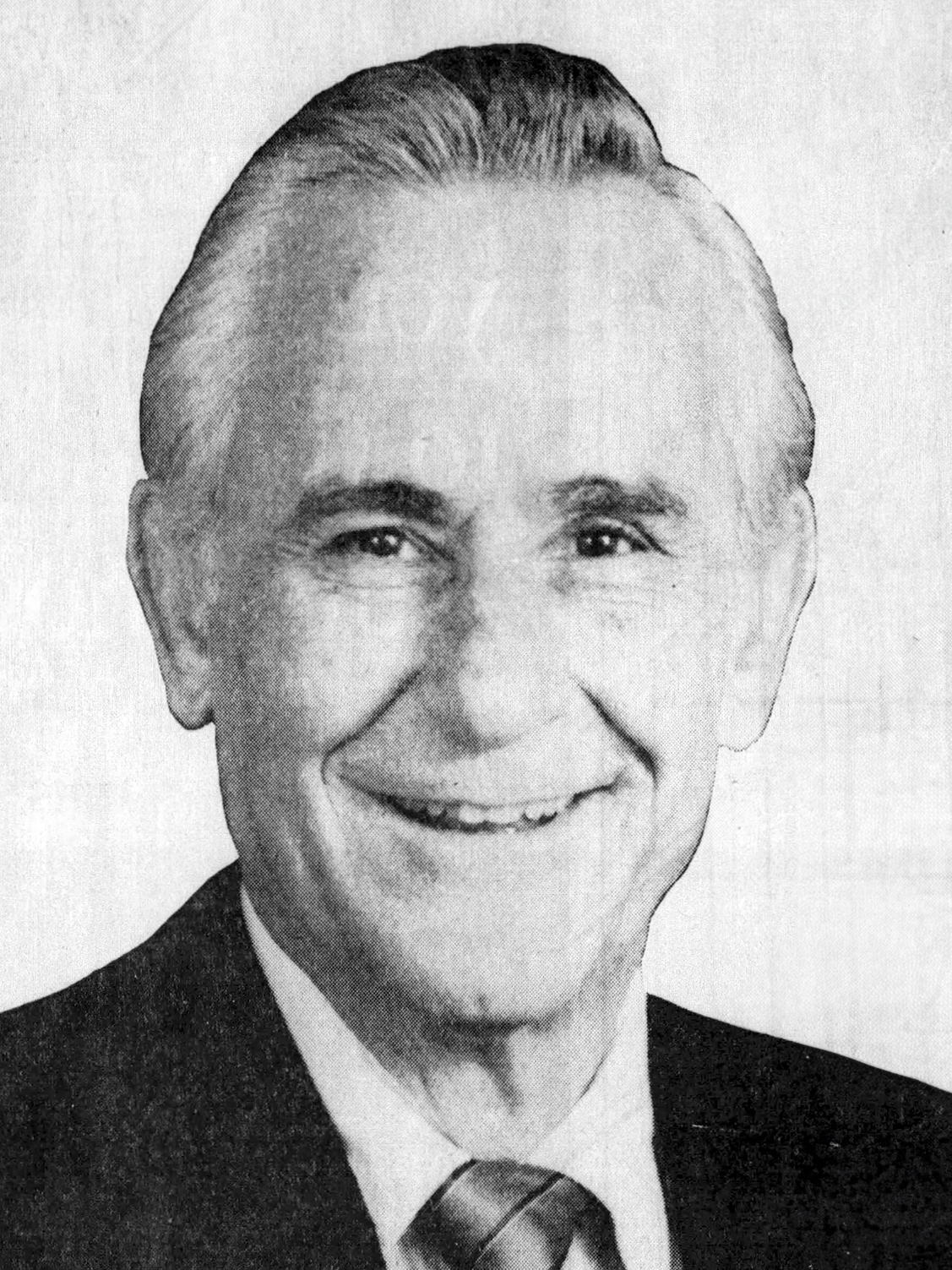

Nominee	George Ariyoshi	Frank Fasi	D. G. Anderson
Party	Democratic	Independent Democrat	Republican
Running mate	John D. Waihee III	Randy A. K. Piltz	Pat Saiki
Popular vote	141,043	89,303	81,507
Percentage	45.2%	28.6%	26.1%
- County results Ariyoshi: 40–50% 50–60%
Governor before election
George Ariyoshi
Democratic
Elected Governor
George Ariyoshi
Democratic

The 1982 Hawaii gubernatorial election was Hawaii's seventh gubernatorial election. The election was held on November 2, 1982, and resulted in a victory for the Democratic candidate, governor George Ariyoshi, over Frank Fasi, running as an Independent Democrat, and the Republican candidate, state senator D. G. Anderson. Ariyoshi received more votes than any other candidate in every county in the state.

== Idaho ==
1982 Idaho gubernatorial election
- November 2, 1982
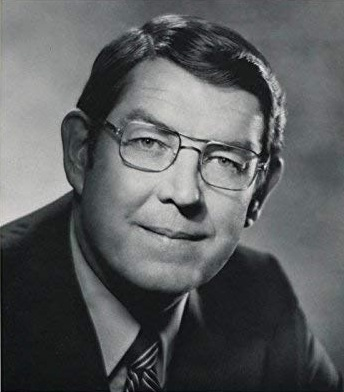

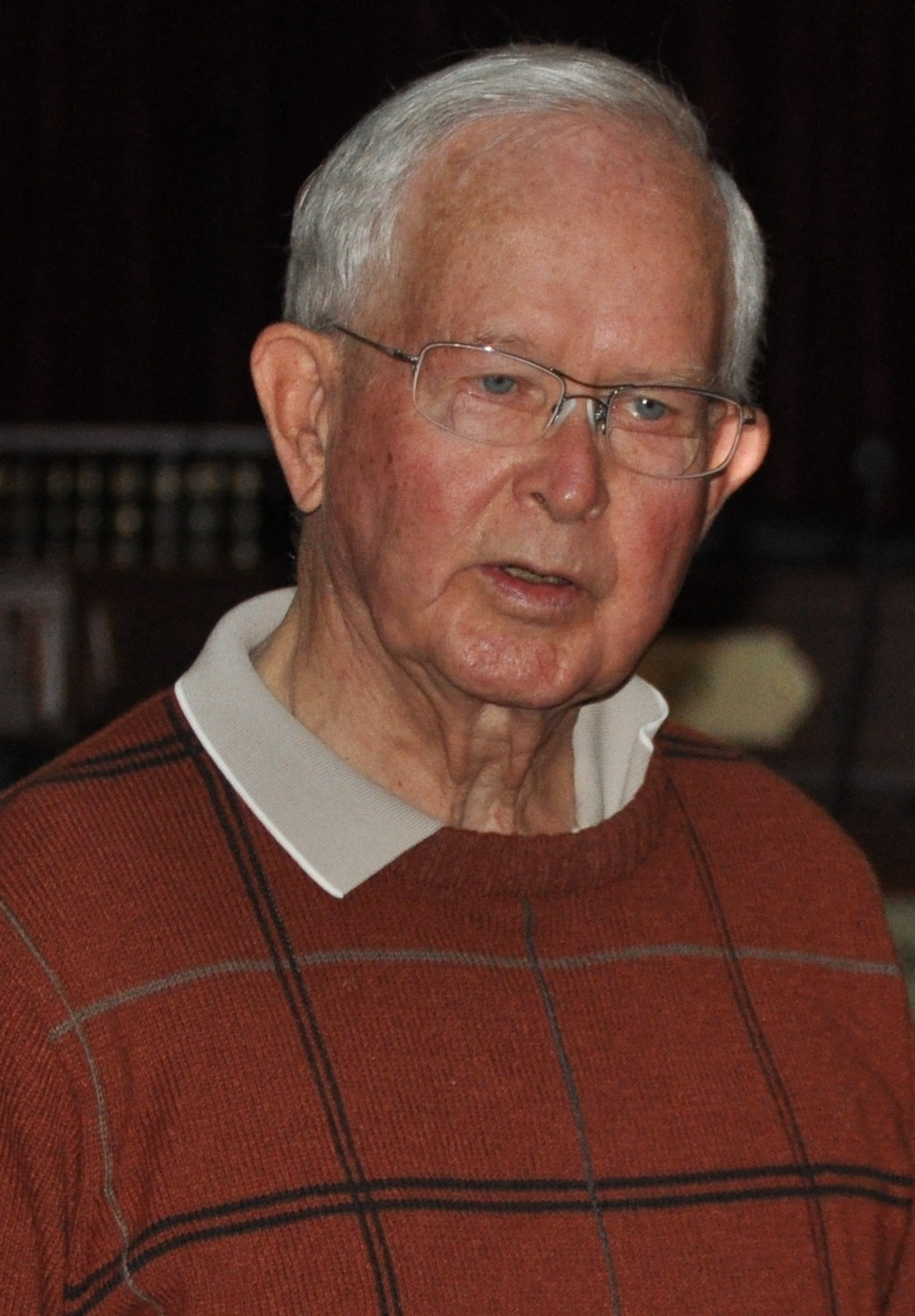
Nominee	John V. Evans	Phil Batt
Party	Democratic	Republican
Popular vote	165,365	161,157
Percentage	50.6%	49.4%
- County results Evans: 50–60% 60–70% 70–80% Batt: 50–60% 60–70% 70–80%
Governor before election
John V. Evans
Democratic
Elected Governor
John V. Evans
Democratic

The 1982 Idaho gubernatorial election was held on November 2. Incumbent Democrat John V. Evans narrowly defeated Republican nominee Phil Batt with 50.64% of the vote, the fourth of six consecutive wins for the Democratic party.

== Illinois ==
1982 Illinois gubernatorial election
- November 2, 1982
- Turnout: 61.58% ▲7.35 pp
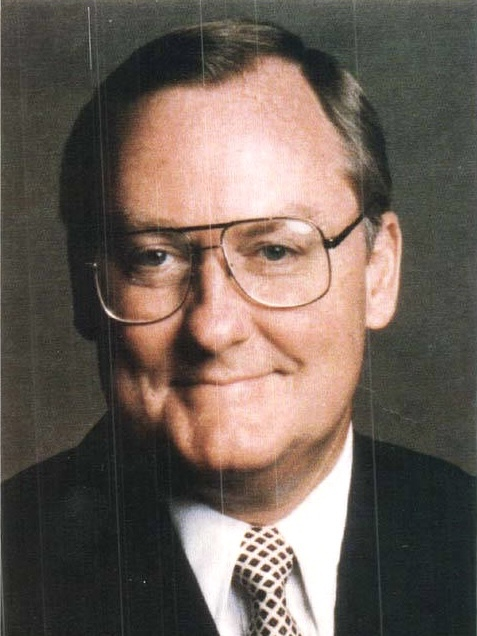

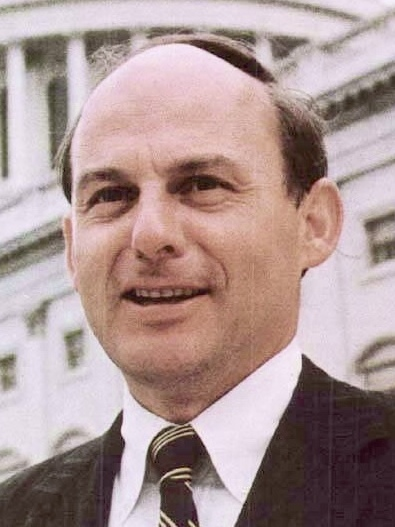
Nominee	Jim Thompson	Adlai Stevenson III
Party	Republican	Democratic
Running mate	George Ryan	Grace Mary Stern
Popular vote	1,816,101	1,811,027
Percentage	49.44%	49.30%
- County results Thompson: 40-50% 50-60% 60-70% 70-80% Stevenson: 40–50% 50–60% 60–70%
Governor before election
James R. Thompson
Republican
Elected Governor
James R. Thompson
Republican

The 1982 Illinois gubernatorial election was held in Illinois on November 2, 1982. Incumbent Republican governor James R. Thompson won a third term in office, defeating the Democratic nominee, former United States Senator Adlai Stevenson III, by a slim margin of 5,074 votes.

== Iowa ==
1982 Iowa gubernatorial election
- November 2, 1982
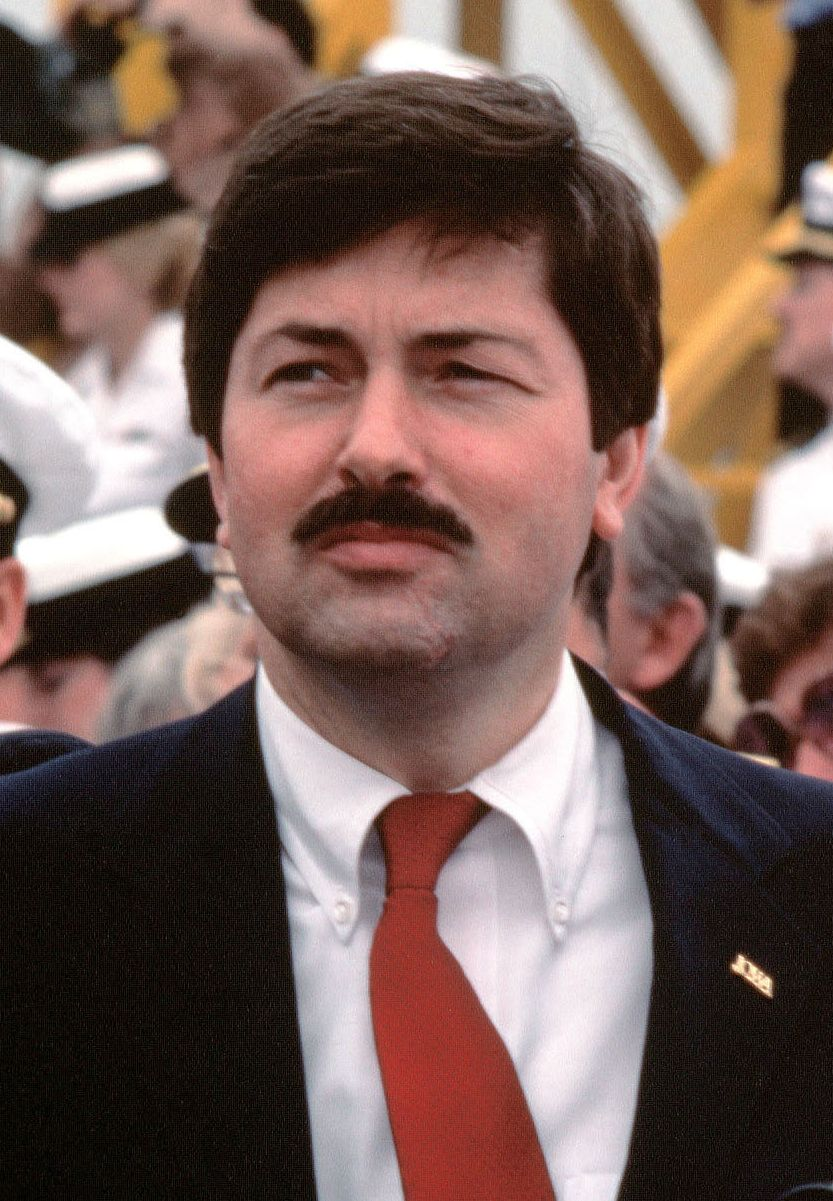

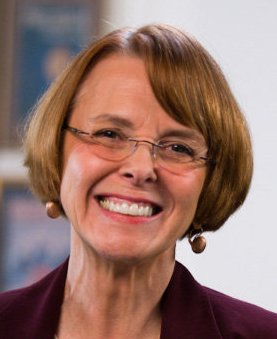
Nominee	Terry Branstad	Roxanne Conlin
Party	Republican	Democratic
Popular vote	548,313	483,291
Percentage	52.8%	46.5%
- County results Branstad: 40-50% 50-60% 60-70% 70-80% Conlin: 40–50% 50–60%
Governor before election
Robert D. Ray
Republican
Elected Governor
Terry Branstad
Republican

The 1982 Iowa gubernatorial election was held on November 2, 1982. Republican nominee Terry Branstad defeated Democratic nominee Roxanne Conlin with 52.81% of the vote.

== Kansas ==
1982 Kansas gubernatorial election
- November 2, 1982
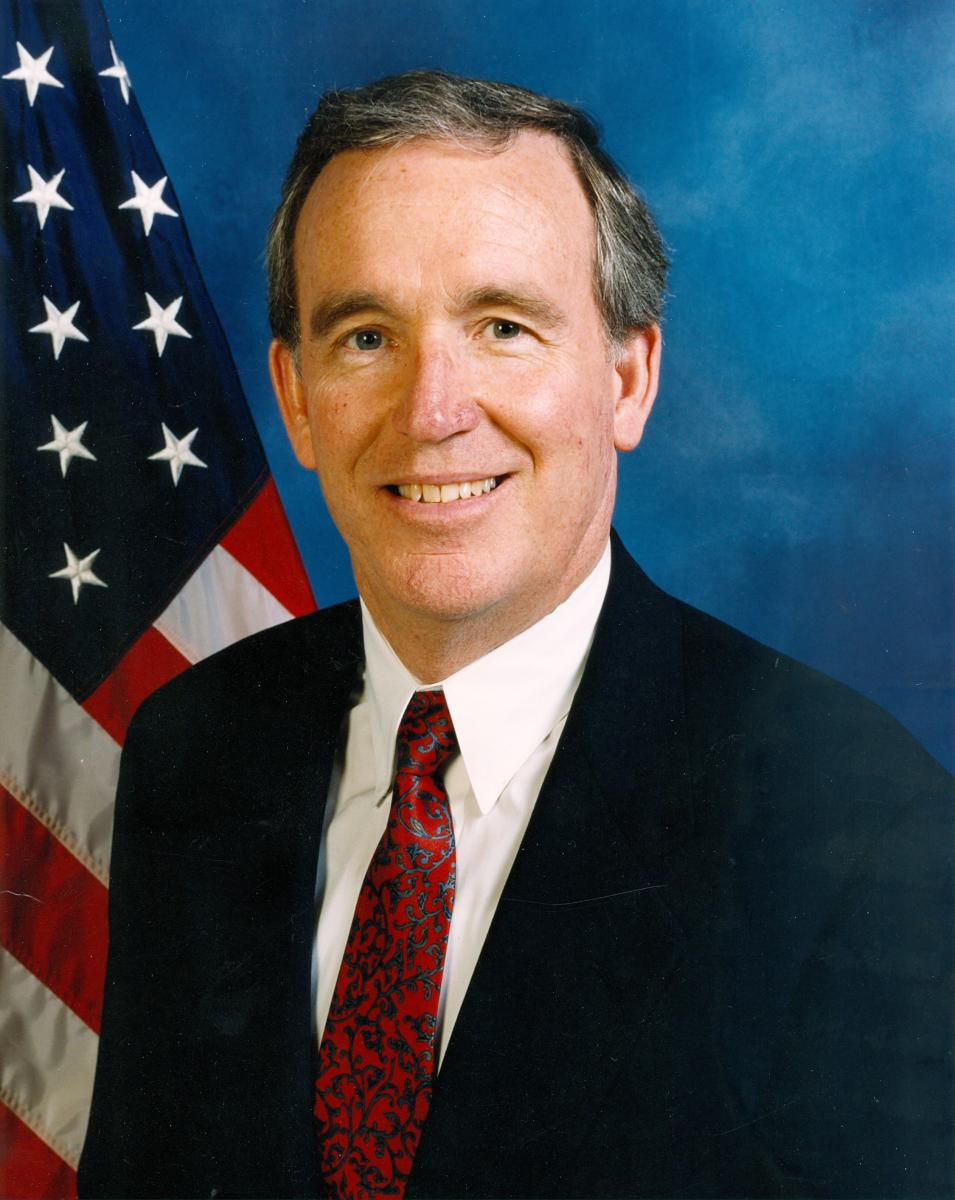

Nominee	John W. Carlin	Sam Hardage
Party	Democratic	Republican
Running mate	Thomas Docking	Dan Thiessen
Popular vote	405,772	339,356
Percentage	53.2%	44.5%
- County results Carlin: 40–50% 50–60% 60–70% 70–80% Hardage: 40–50% 50–60% 60–70% 70–80% 80–90%
Governor before election
John W. Carlin
Democratic
Elected Governor
John W. Carlin
Democratic

The 1982 Kansas gubernatorial election was held on November 2, 1982. Incumbent Democrat John W. Carlin defeated Republican nominee Sam Hardage with 53.2% of the vote.

== Maine ==
1982 Maine gubernatorial election
- November 2, 1982
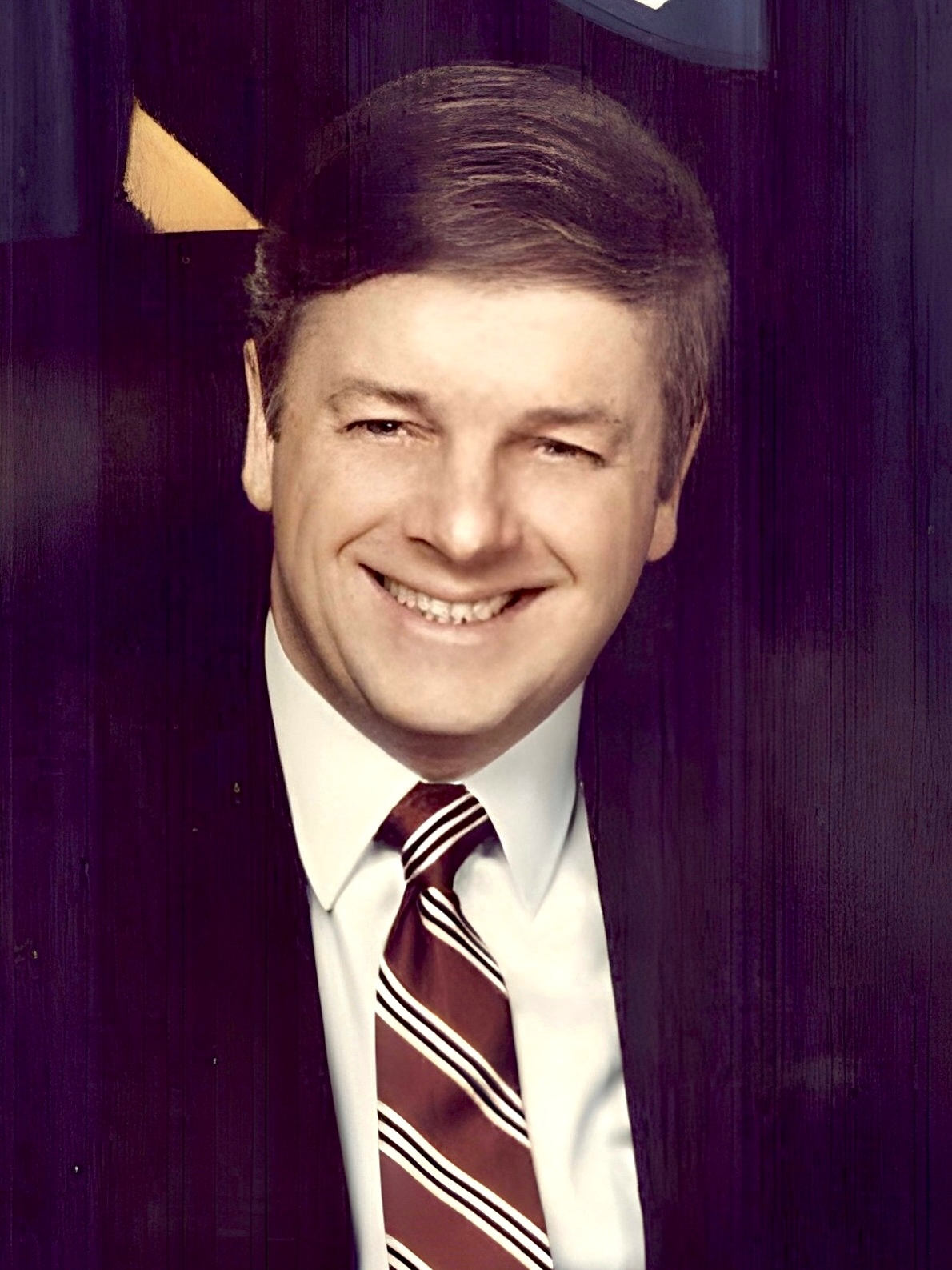

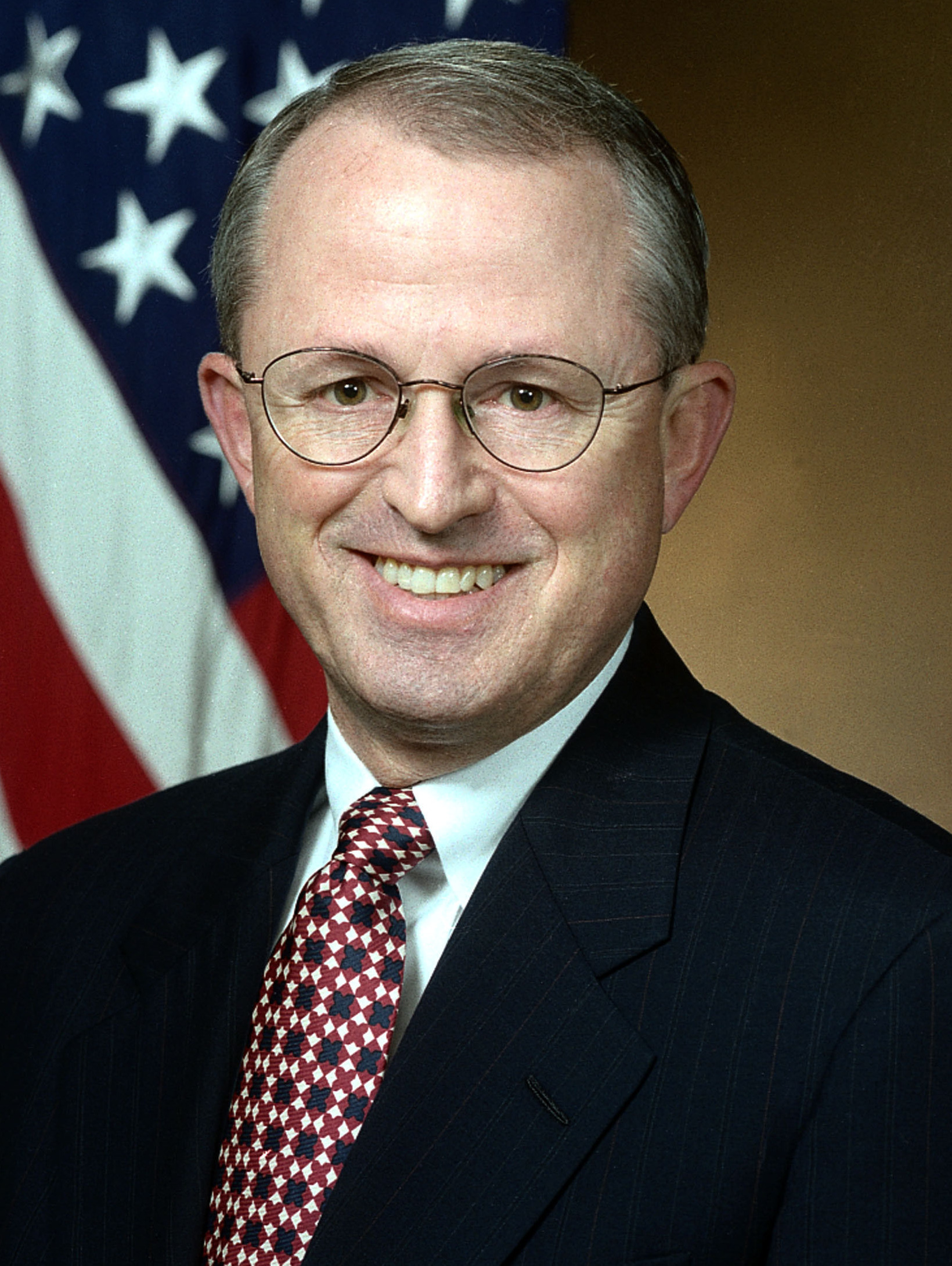
Nominee	Joseph Brennan	Charles Cragin
Party	Democratic	Republican
Popular vote	281,066	172,949
Percentage	61.91%	38.09%
- Brennan: 40–50% 50–60% 60–70% 70–80% 80–90% Cragin: 40–50% 50–60% 60–70% 70–80% 80–90% Tie: 40–50% 50%
Governor before election
Joseph Brennan
Democratic
Elected Governor
Joseph Brennan
Democratic

The 1982 Maine gubernatorial election took place on November 2, 1982. Incumbent Democratic Governor Joseph Brennan defeated Republican challenger Charles R. Cragin. Brennan defeated Cragin, winning his re-election by the highest percent margin in more than thirty years.

== Maryland ==
1982 Maryland gubernatorial election
- November 2, 1982
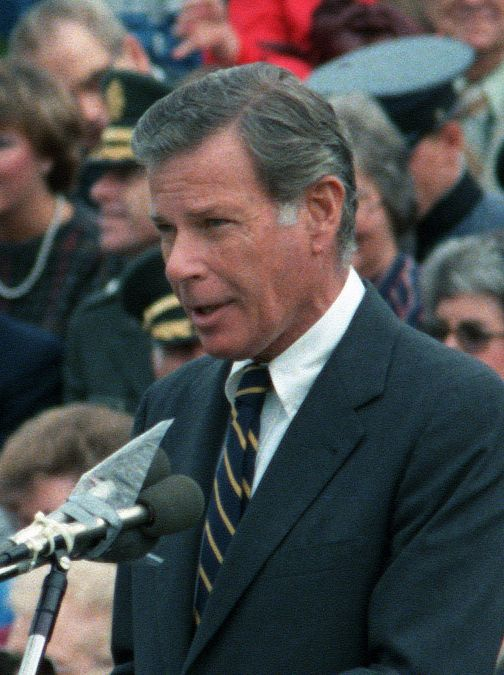

Nominee	Harry Hughes	Robert A. Pascal
Party	Democratic	Republican
Running mate	J. Joseph Curran Jr.	Newton Steers
Popular vote	705,910	432,826
Percentage	61.97%	38.00%
- County results Hughes: 50-60% 60-70% 70-80% Pascal: 50-60%
Governor before election
Harry Hughes
Democratic
Elected Governor
Harry Hughes
Democratic

The 1982 Maryland gubernatorial election was held on November 2, 1982. Incumbent Democrat Harry Hughes defeated Republican nominee Robert A. Pascal with 61.97% of the vote.

== Massachusetts ==
1982 Massachusetts gubernatorial election
- November 2, 1982
- Turnout: 82.51% ▲3.54
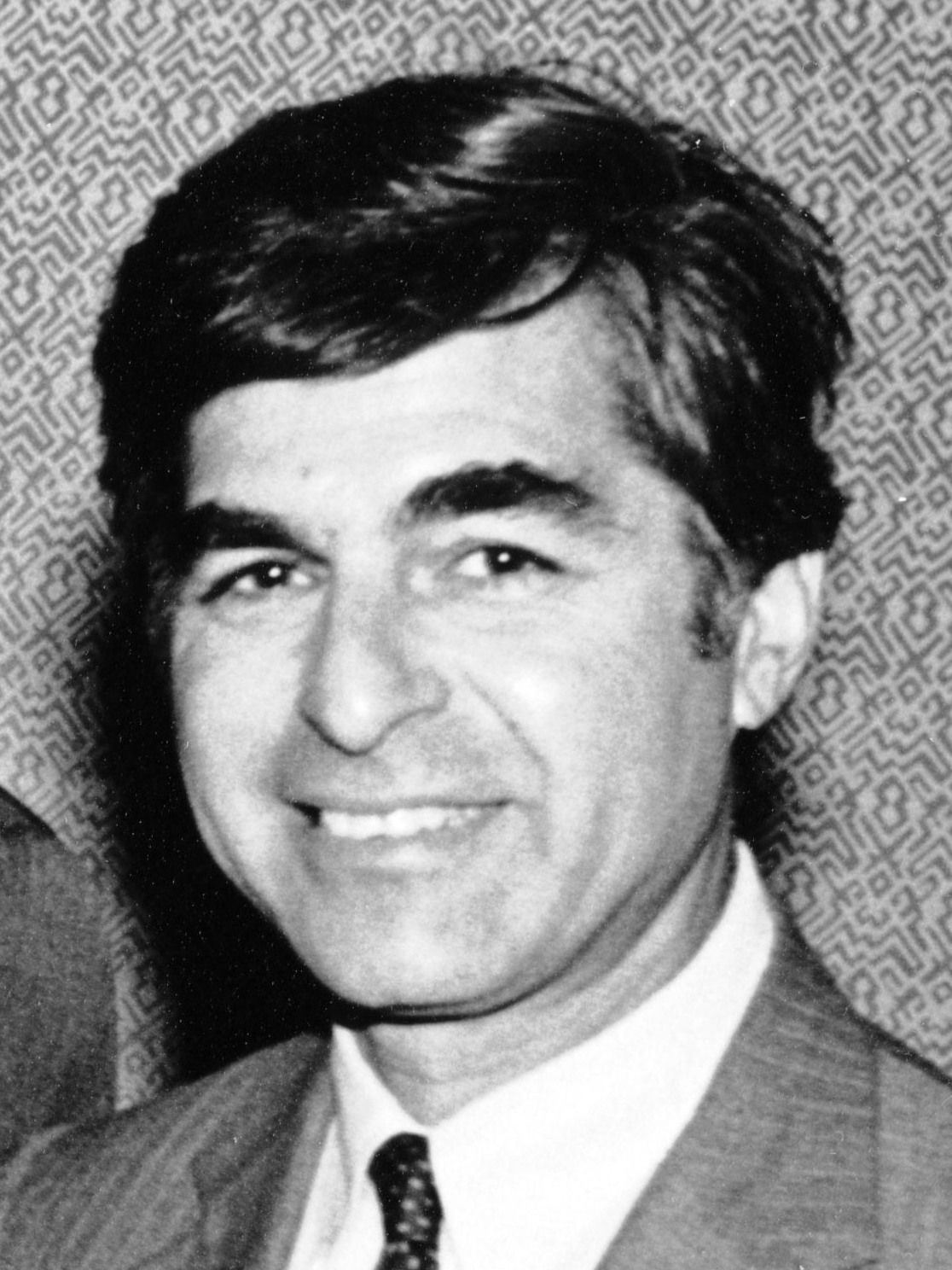

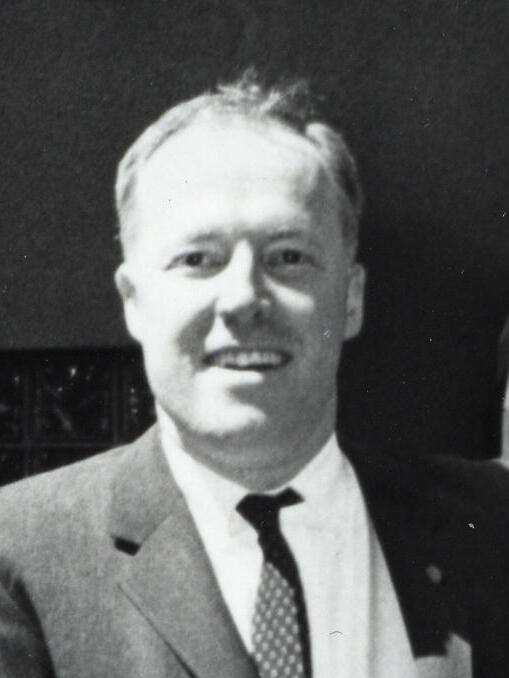
Nominee	Michael Dukakis	John W. Sears
Party	Democratic	Republican
Running mate	John Kerry	Leon Lombardi
Popular vote	1,219,109	749,679
Percentage	59.48%	36.57%
- Dukakis: 40–50% 50–60% 60–70% 70–80% 80–90% Sears: 40–50% 50–60% 60–70% 70–80%
Governor before election
Edward J. King
Democratic
Elected Governor
Michael Dukakis
Democratic

The 1982 Massachusetts gubernatorial election was held on November 2, 1982. Michael Dukakis was elected to a second non-consecutive term. He beat Republican John W. Sears in the general election, after defeating incumbent Governor Edward J. King in the Democratic primary.

== Michigan ==
1982 Michigan gubernatorial election
- November 2, 1982
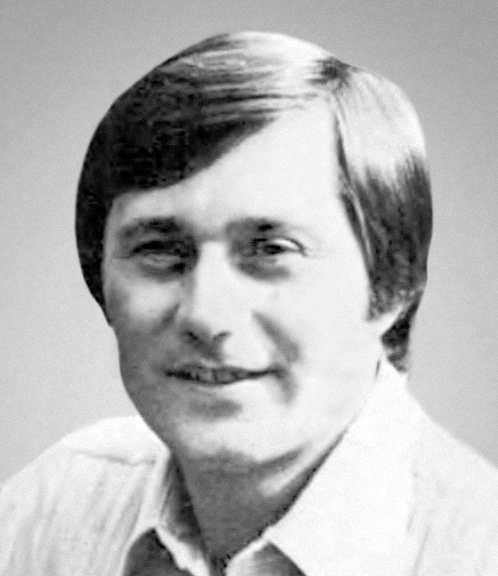

Nominee	James Blanchard	Richard Headlee
Party	Democratic	Republican
Popular vote	1,561,291	1,369,582
Percentage	51.4%	45.1%
- County results Blanchard: 40–50% 50–60% 60–70% Headlee: 40–50% 50–60% 60–70%
Governor before election
William Milliken
Republican
Elected Governor
James Blanchard
Democratic

The 1982 Michigan gubernatorial election was held on November 2, 1982. Incumbent Governor William Milliken decided to retire instead of seeking a fourth full term as governor. The primary elections occurred on August 10, 1982. Businessman Richard Headlee narrowly defeated incumbent lieutenant governor James Brickley in a four way race on the Republican side. Congressman James Blanchard defeated Michigan Senate Majority Leader William B. Fitzgerald Jr. by a wide margin a fractured seven way race. Blanchard won the general election by a relatively comfortable 6.31% margin. Blanchard became the first Democrat to win the governor’s mansion in Michigan in 22 years.

== Minnesota ==
1982 Minnesota gubernatorial election
- November 2, 1982
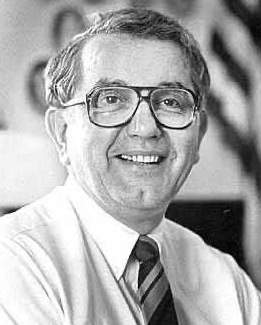

Nominee	Rudy Perpich	Wheelock Whitney, Jr.
Party	Democratic (DFL)	Ind.-Republican
Running mate	Marlene Johnson	Lauris Krenik
Popular vote	1,049,104	711,796
Percentage	58.76%	39.86%
- County results Perpich: 40–50% 50–60% 60–70% 70–80% 80–90% Whitney: 40–50% 50–60%
Governor before election
Al Quie
Ind.-Republican
Elected Governor
Rudy Perpich
Democratic (DFL)

The 1982 Minnesota gubernatorial election took place on November 2, 1982. Minnesota Democratic–Farmer–Labor Party candidate Rudy Perpich defeated Independent-Republican Party challenger Wheelock Whitney, Jr. Warren Spannaus unsuccessfully ran for the Democratic nomination, while Lou Wangberg and Harold Stassen unsuccessfully ran for the Republican nomination. Perpich became the first candidate to receive over a million votes in a gubernatorial election in Minnesota.

== Nebraska ==
1982 Nebraska gubernatorial election
- November 2, 1982
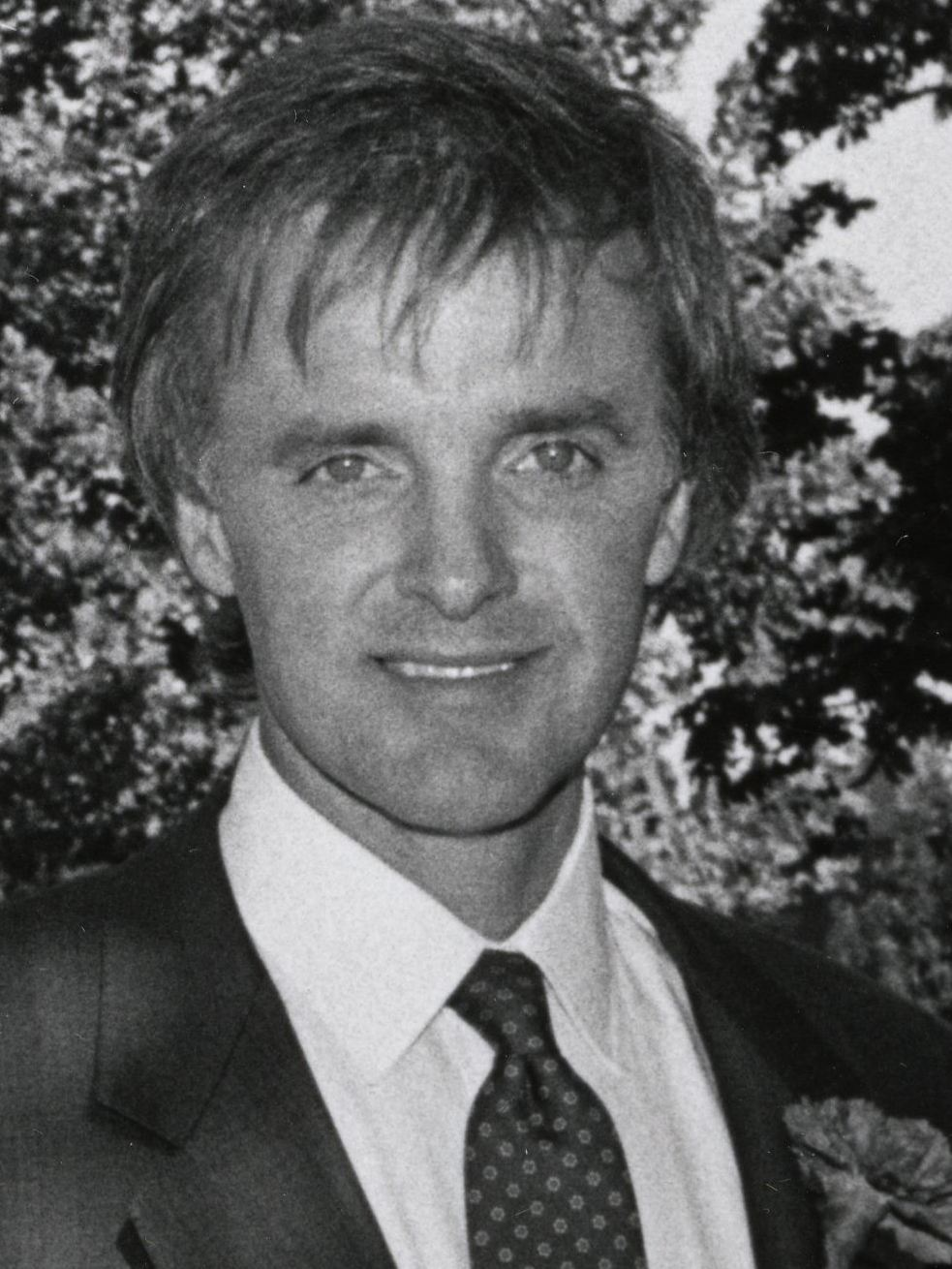

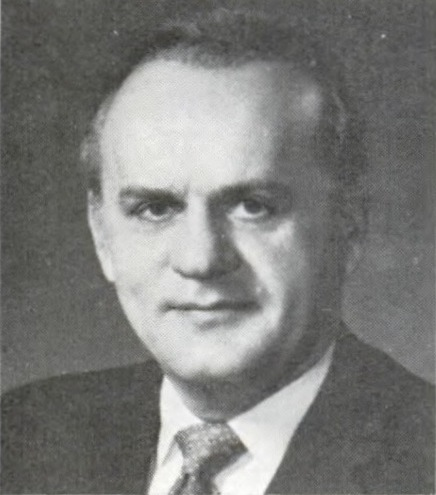
Nominee	Bob Kerrey	Charles Thone
Party	Democratic	Republican
Running mate	Donald McGinley	Roland Luedtke
Popular vote	277,436	270,203
Percentage	50.6%	49.3%
- County results Kerrey: 50–60% 60–70% Thone: 50–60% 60–70% 70–80% 80–90%
Governor before election
Charles Thone
Republican
Elected Governor
Bob Kerrey
Democratic

The 1982 Nebraska gubernatorial election was held on November 2, 1982, and featured businessman Bob Kerrey, a Democrat, narrowly defeating incumbent Republican governor Charles Thone.

== Nevada ==
1982 Nevada gubernatorial election
- November 2, 1982
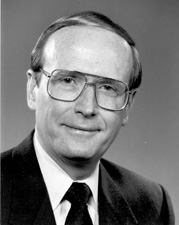

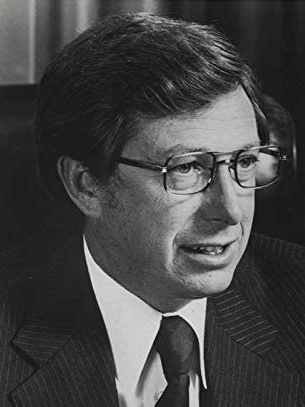
Nominee	Richard Bryan	Robert List
Party	Democratic	Republican
Popular vote	128,132	100,104
Percentage	53.30%	41.65%
- County results Bryan: 40–50% 50–60% 60–70% List: 40–50% 50–60%
Governor before election
Robert List
Republican
Elected Governor
Richard Bryan
Democratic

The 1982 Nevada gubernatorial election took place on November 2, 1982 to elect the Governor of Nevada. Incumbent Republican Robert List ran unsuccessfully for re-election to a second term. He lost to Democratic nominee Richard Bryan by 11.7%.

== New Hampshire ==
1982 New Hampshire gubernatorial election
- November 2, 1982
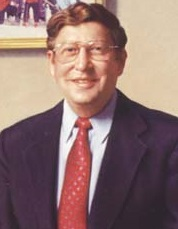

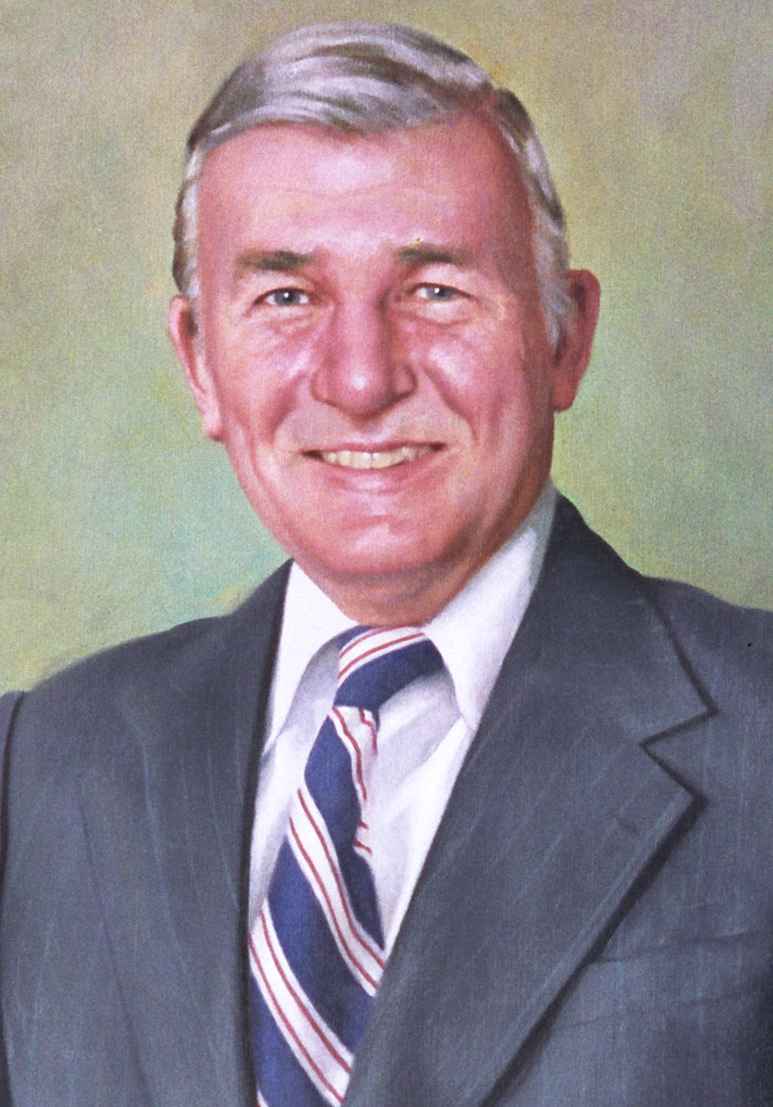
Nominee	John H. Sununu	Hugh Gallen
Party	Republican	Democratic
Popular vote	145,389	132,317
Percentage	51.47%	46.84%
- Sununu: 40–50% 50–60% 60–70% 70–80% Gallen: 40–50% 50–60% 60–70% >90%
Governor before election
Hugh Gallen
Democratic
Elected Governor
John H. Sununu
Republican

The 1982 New Hampshire gubernatorial election took place on November 2, 1982. Incumbent Democratic governor Hugh Gallen ran for re-election but was defeated by Tufts University professor John Sununu. Sununu, who defeated Lou D'Allesandro for the Republican nomination, became the first Arab-American governor of New Hampshire. Gallen died just over a week before Sununu's inauguration.

== New Mexico ==
1982 New Mexico gubernatorial election
- November 2, 1982
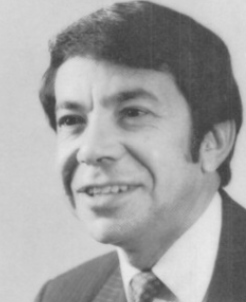

Nominee	Toney Anaya	John B. Irick
Party	Democratic	Republican
Popular vote	215,840	191,626
Percentage	52.97%	47.03%
- County results Anaya: 50–60% 60–70% 70–80% Irick: 50–60% 60–70%
Governor before election
Bruce King
Democratic
Elected Governor
Toney Anaya
Democratic

The 1982 New Mexico gubernatorial election took place on November 2, 1982 to elect the governor of New Mexico. Due to term limits, incumbent Democrat Bruce King was ineligible to seek a second consecutive (and third overall) term as governor. Democrat Toney Anaya defeated Republican state senator John B. Irick by about five points. Anaya was the first Democrat to carry Harding County in a gubernatorial election since Thomas J. Mabry in 1946.

== New York ==
1982 New York gubernatorial election
- November 2, 1982
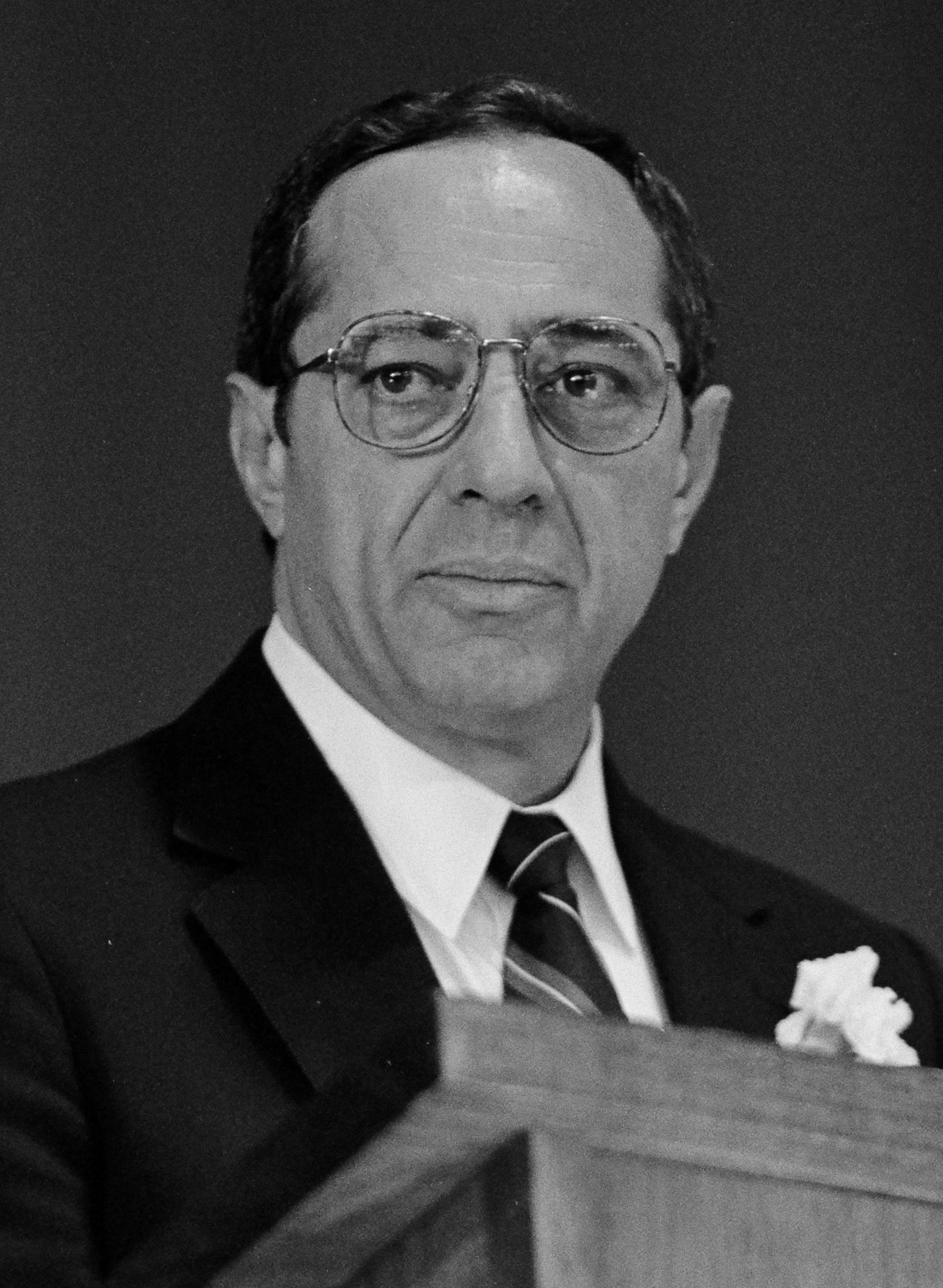

Nominee	Mario Cuomo	Lewis Lehrman
Party	Democratic	Republican
Alliance	Liberal	Conservative; Statewide Ind.
Running mate	Alfred DelBello	James L. Emery
Popular vote	2,675,213	2,494,827
Percentage	50.91%	47.48%
- County results Cuomo: 40–50% 50–60% 60–70% 70–80% Lehrman: 50–60% 60–70% 70–80%
Governor before election
Hugh Carey
Democratic
Elected Governor
Mario Cuomo
Democratic

The 1982 New York gubernatorial election was held on November 2, 1982, to elect the Governor and Lieutenant Governor of New York. Incumbent Democratic Governor Hugh Carey chose not to run for a third term, which resulted in an open race. Democratic nominee Mario Cuomo, the Lieutenant Governor of New York, narrowly defeated Republican Lewis Lehrman, a banker who ran as a conservative.

== Ohio ==
1982 Ohio gubernatorial election
- November 2, 1982
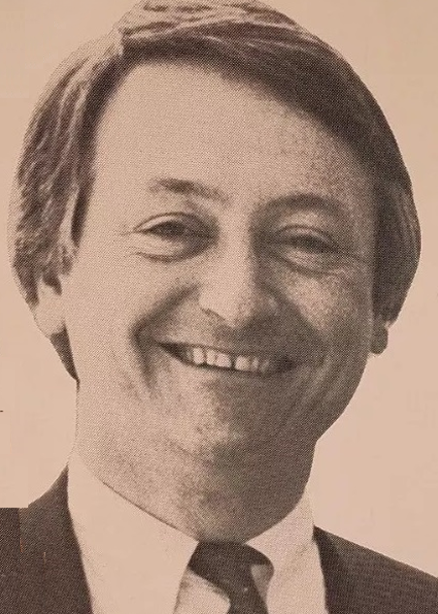

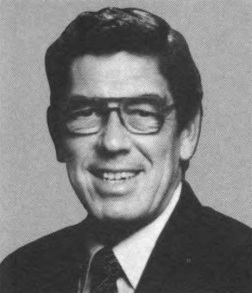
Nominee	Dick Celeste	Bud Brown
Party	Democratic	Republican
Popular vote	1,981,882	1,303,962
Percentage	59.0%	38.9%
- County results Celeste: 40–50% 50–60% 60–70% 70–80% Brown: 40–50% 50–60% 60–70%
Governor before election
Jim Rhodes
Republican
Elected Governor
Dick Celeste
Democratic

The 1982 Ohio gubernatorial election was held in Ohio on November 2, 1982. Dick Celeste of the Democratic Party was elected with 59% of the vote.

== Oklahoma ==
1982 Oklahoma gubernatorial election
- November 2, 1982
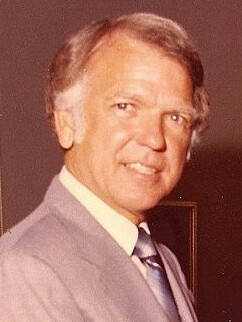

Nominee	George Nigh	Tom Daxon
Party	Democratic	Republican
Popular vote	548,159	332,207
Percentage	62.0%	37.6%
- County results Nigh: 50–60% 60–70% 70–80% 80–90%
Governor before election
George Nigh
Democratic
Elected Governor
George Nigh
Democratic

The 1982 Oklahoma gubernatorial election was held on November 2, 1982, and was a race for Governor of Oklahoma. Democrat George Nigh won re-election by a substantial majority over the Republican, former State Auditor and Inspector Tom Daxon.

== Oregon ==
1982 Oregon gubernatorial election
- November 2, 1982
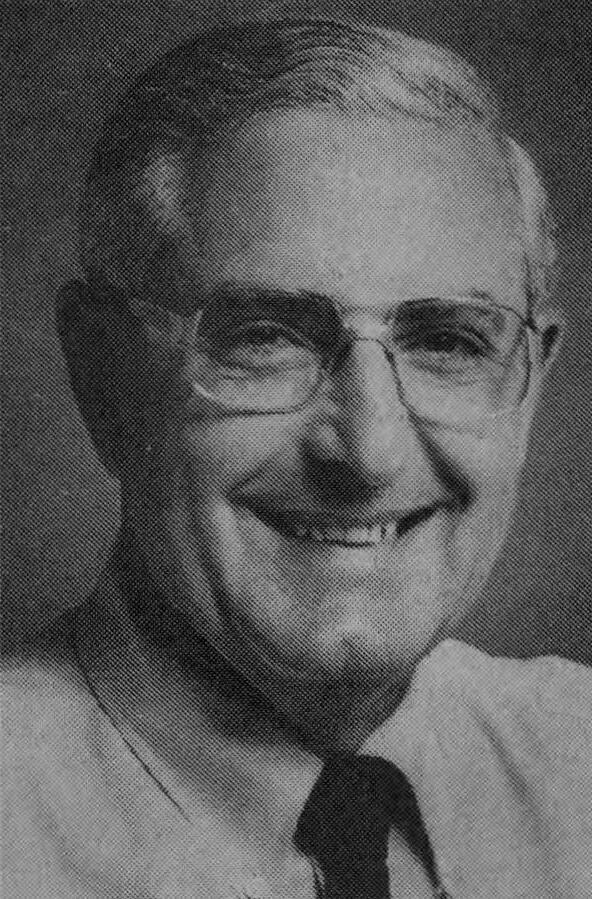

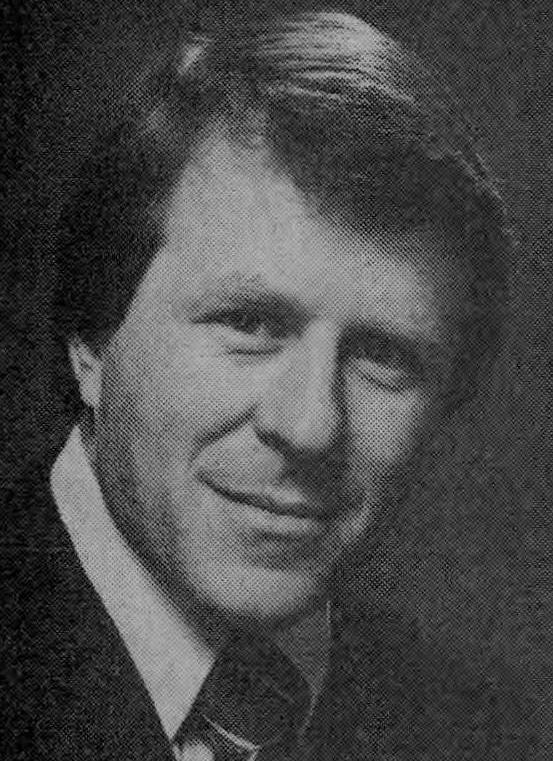
Nominee	Victor Atiyeh	Ted Kulongoski
Party	Republican	Democratic
Popular vote	639,841	374,316
Percentage	61.4%	35.9%
- County results Atiyeh: 50–60% 60–70% 70–80%
Governor before election
Victor Atiyeh
Republican
Elected Governor
Victor Atiyeh
Republican

The 1982 Oregon gubernatorial election took place on November 2, 1982. Incumbent Republican Governor Victor Atiyeh won re-election to a second term in a landslide, defeating Democratic state senator Ted Kulongoski and carrying every county in the state.

== Pennsylvania ==
1982 Pennsylvania gubernatorial election
- November 2, 1982
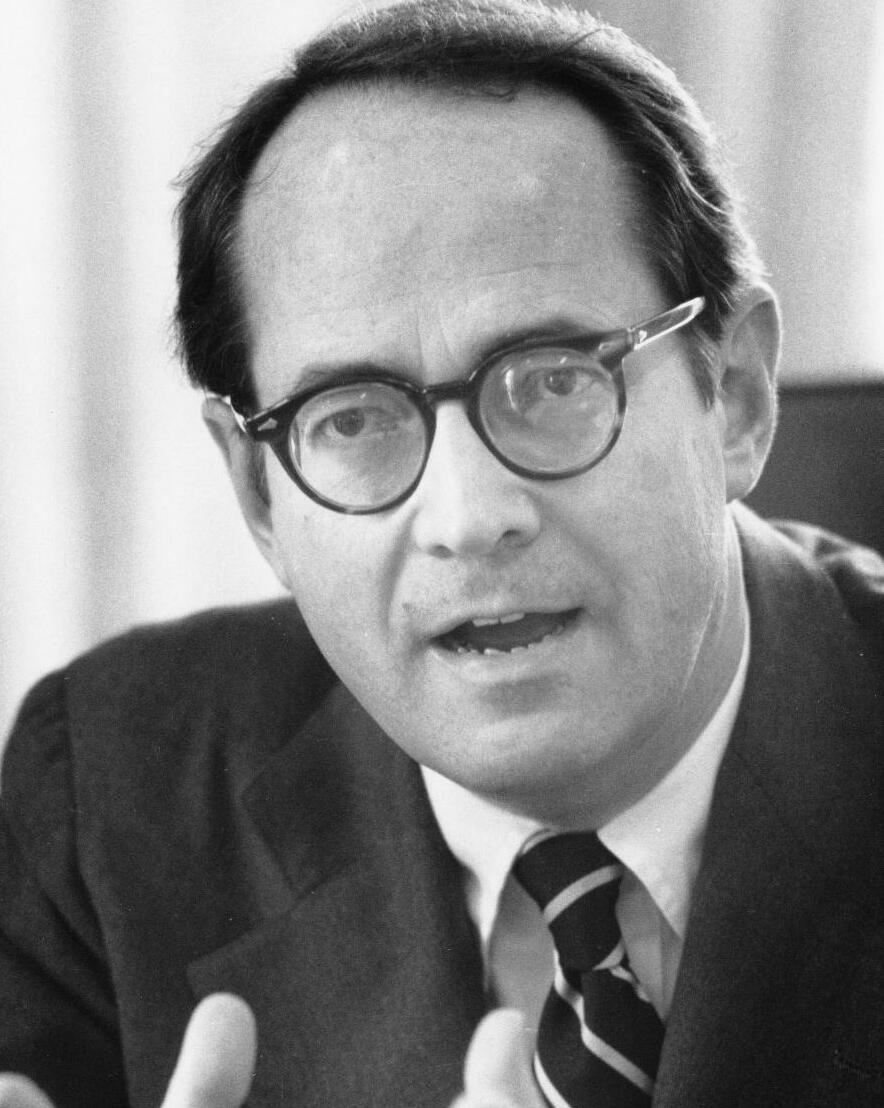

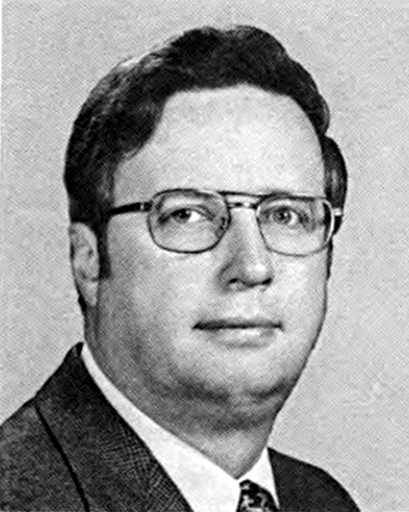
Nominee	Dick Thornburgh	Allen Ertel
Party	Republican	Democratic
Running mate	Bill Scranton III	James Lloyd
Popular vote	1,872,784	1,772,353
Percentage	50.84%	48.11%
- County results Thornburgh: 40-50% 50-60% 60-70% 70-80% Ertel: 50–60% 60–70%
Governor before election
Dick Thornburgh
Republican
Elected Governor
Dick Thornburgh
Republican

The 1982 Pennsylvania gubernatorial election was held on November 2, 1982, between incumbent Republican Dick Thornburgh and Democratic U.S. Congressman Allen E. Ertel. Thornburgh was a popular incumbent, who largely was the favorite throughout the race. However, owing to a nationwide recession which hit the state particularly hard, and a backlash to Reaganomics, the final result ended up becoming much closer than what was initially anticipated.

== Rhode Island ==
1982 Rhode Island gubernatorial election
- November 2, 1982
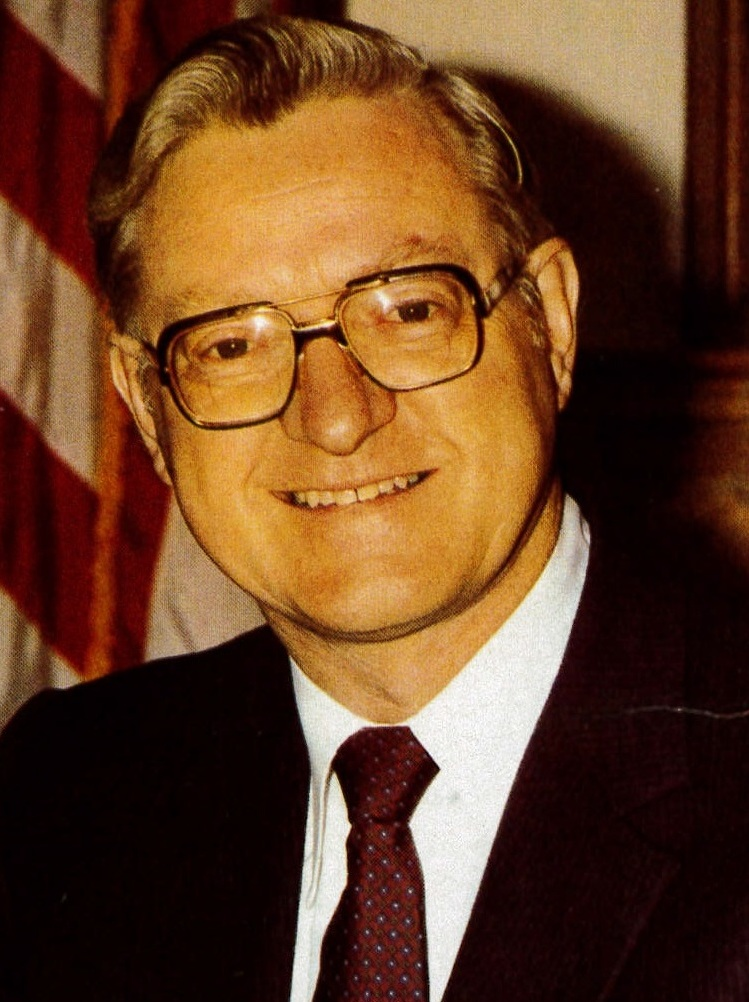

Nominee	J. Joseph Garrahy	Vincent Marzullo
Party	Democratic	Republican
Popular vote	247,208	79,602
Percentage	73.30%	23.60%
- Garrahy: 50–60% 60–70% 70–80% 80–90%
Governor before election
J. Joseph Garrahy
Democratic
Elected Governor
J. Joseph Garrahy
Democratic

The 1982 Rhode Island gubernatorial election was held on November 2, 1982. Incumbent Democrat J. Joseph Garrahy defeated Republican nominee Vincent Marzullo with 73.30% of the vote.

== South Carolina ==
1982 South Carolina gubernatorial election
- November 2, 1982
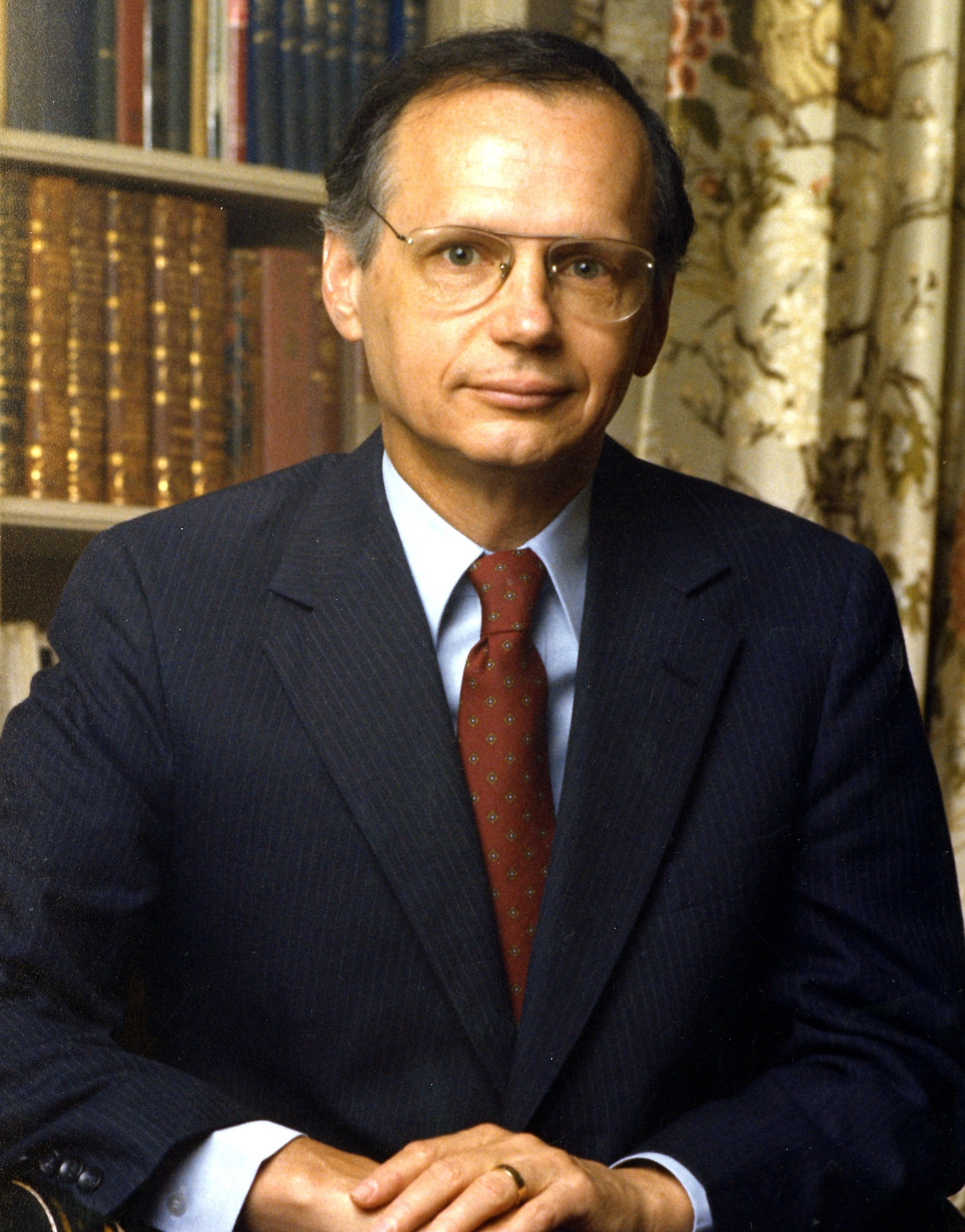

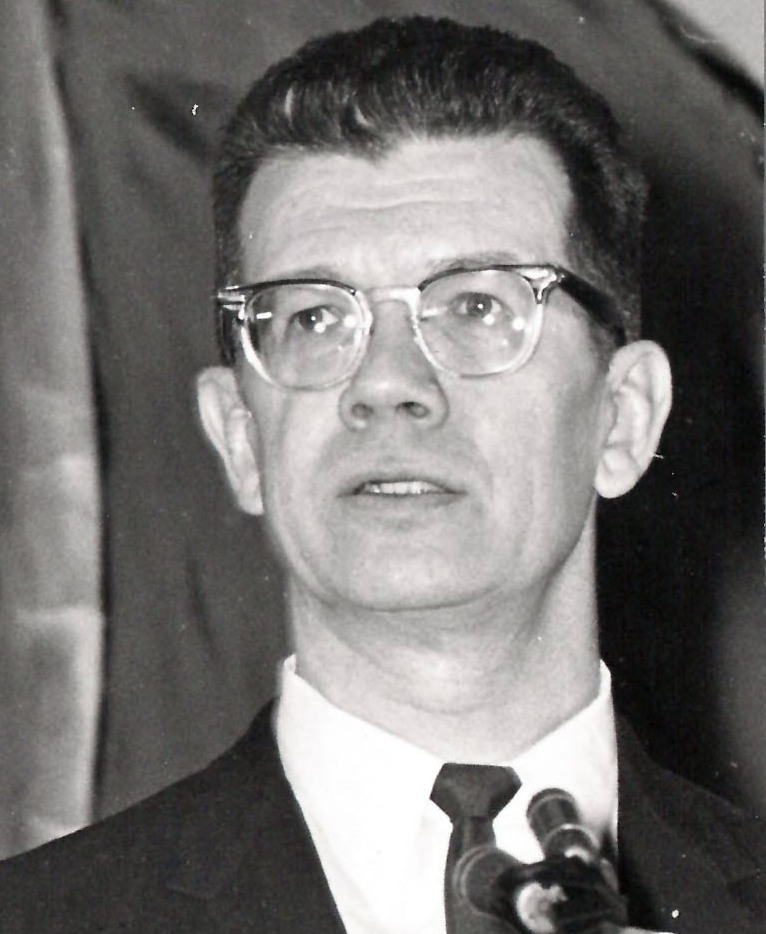
Nominee	Richard Riley	W. D. Workman, Jr.
Party	Democratic	Republican
Popular vote	468,787	202,806
Percentage	69.8%	30.2%
- County results Riley: 50–60% 60–70% 70–80% 80–90%
Governor before election
Richard Riley
Democratic
Elected Governor
Richard Riley
Democratic

The 1982 South Carolina gubernatorial election was held on November 2, 1982 to select the governor of the state of South Carolina. The state constitution was amended by the voters on November 4, 1980 to allow for the governor to serve a second consecutive four-year term. Governor Richard Riley, the popular Democratic incumbent, easily defeated Republican W. D. Workman, Jr. and became the first governor since Thomas Gordon McLeod in 1924 to be elected to a second consecutive term.

== South Dakota ==
1982 South Dakota gubernatorial election
- November 2, 1982
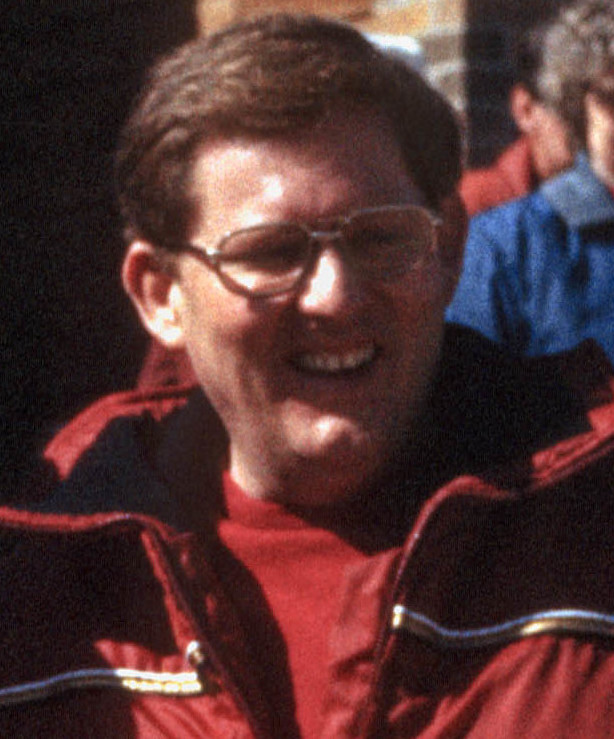

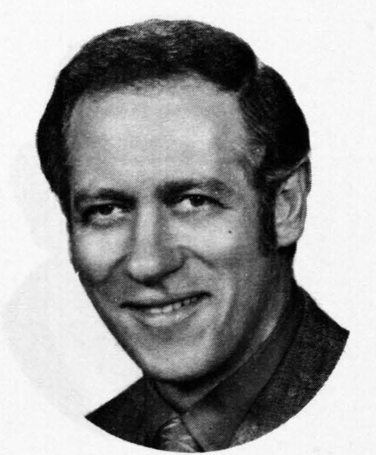
Nominee	Bill Janklow	Mike O'Connor
Party	Republican	Democratic
Running mate	Lowell Hansen	Willis Danokas
Popular vote	197,429	81,136
Percentage	70.9%	29.1%
- County results Janklow: 50–60% 60–70% 70–80% 80–90% O'Connor: 50–60% 60–70% 80–90%
Governor before election
Bill Janklow
Republican
Elected Governor
Bill Janklow
Republican

The 1982 South Dakota gubernatorial elections were held on November 2, 1982, to elect a Governor of South Dakota. Republican candidate Bill Janklow was elected, defeating Democratic nominee Mike O'Connor to take a second term in office.

== Tennessee ==
1982 Tennessee gubernatorial election
- November 2, 1982
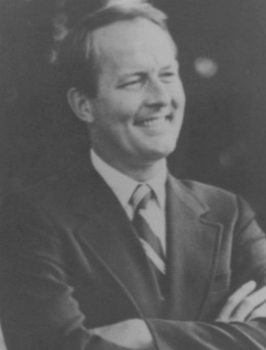

Nominee	Lamar Alexander	Randy Tyree
Party	Republican	Democratic
Popular vote	737,693	500,937
Percentage	59.56%	40.44%
- County results Alexander: 50–60% 60–70% 70–80% 80–90% Tyree: 50–60% 60–70% 70–80%
Governor before election
Lamar Alexander
Republican
Elected Governor
Lamar Alexander
Republican

The 1982 Tennessee gubernatorial election was held on November 2, 1982, to elect the governor of Tennessee. Incumbent Republican governor Lamar Alexander was now qualified to run for re-election because of Tennessee's 1978 constitutional amendment allowing governors to serve a second consecutive four-year term. Alexander ran for re-election and defeated Democratic nominee Randy Tyree with 59.6% of the vote in the general election.

Alexander was the first Republican to be re-elected governor since 1912.

== Texas ==
1982 Texas gubernatorial election
- November 2, 1982
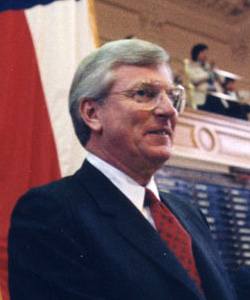

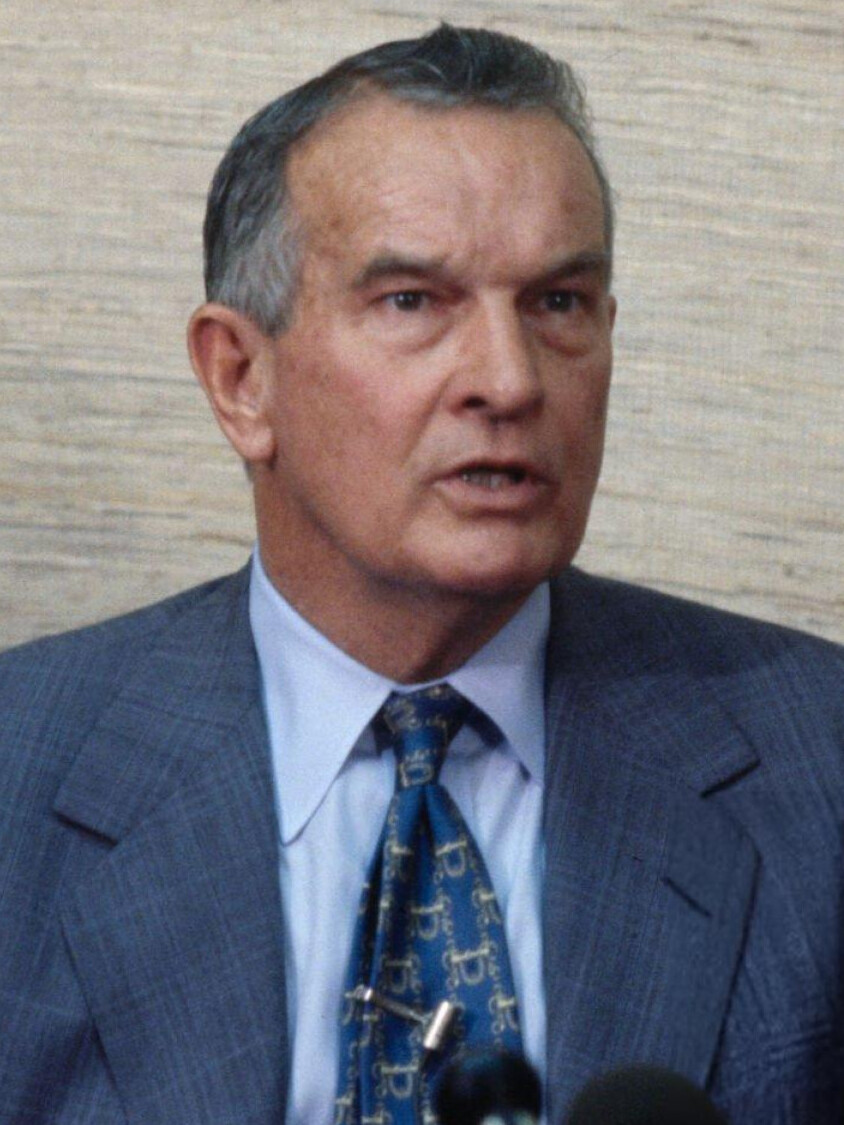
Nominee	Mark White	Bill Clements
Party	Democratic	Republican
Popular vote	1,697,870	1,465,937
Percentage	53.2%	45.9%
- County results White: 50–60% 60–70% 70–80% 80–90% Clements: 50–60% 60–70% 70–80%
Governor before election
Bill Clements
Republican
Elected Governor
Mark White
Democratic

The 1982 Texas gubernatorial election was held on November 2, 1982, to elect the governor of Texas. Incumbent Republican governor Bill Clements ran for reelection, but was defeated in the general election by Democrat Mark White, winning 46% of the vote to White's 53%. White was sworn into office on January 18, 1983.

== Vermont ==
1982 Vermont gubernatorial election
- November 2, 1982
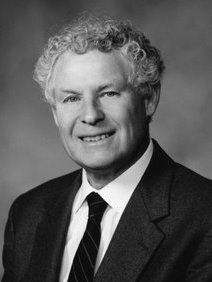

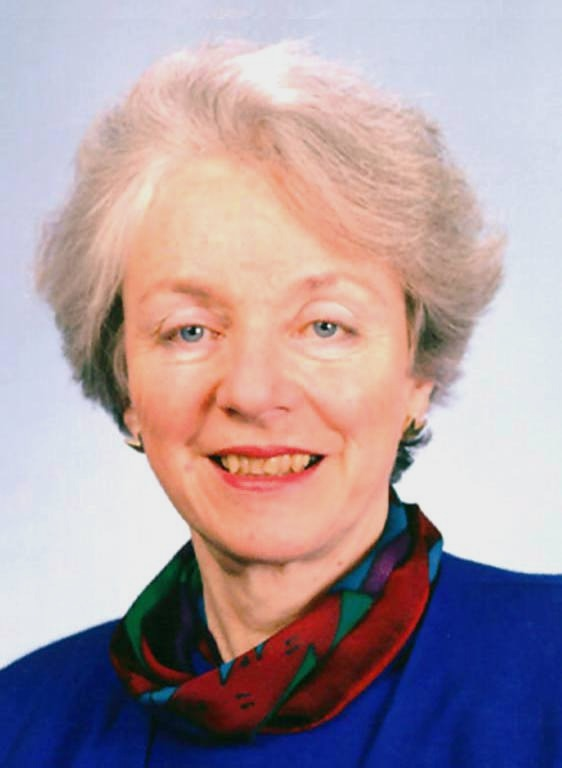
Nominee	Richard Snelling	Madeleine Kunin
Party	Republican	Democratic
Popular vote	93,111	74,394
Percentage	55.0%	44.0%
- Snelling: 40-50% 50-60% 60-70% 70-80% 80-90% Kunin: 40-50% 50-60% 60-70%
Governor before election
Richard Snelling
Republican
Elected Governor
Richard Snelling
Republican

The 1982 Vermont gubernatorial election took place on November 2, 1982. Incumbent Republican Richard A. Snelling ran successfully for a fourth term as Governor of Vermont, defeating Democratic candidate Madeleine Kunin.

== Wisconsin ==
1982 Wisconsin gubernatorial election
- November 2, 1982
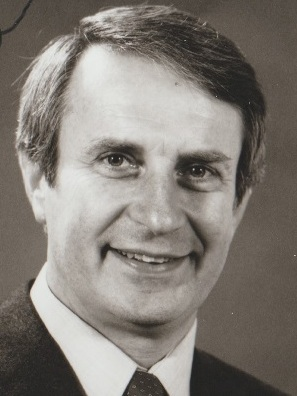

Nominee	Anthony S. Earl	Terry J. Kohler
Party	Democratic	Republican
Running mate	James T. Flynn	Russell A. Olson
Popular vote	896,872	662,738
Percentage	56.76%	41.94%
- County results Earl: 40–50% 50–60% 60–70% 70–80% Kohler: 40–50% 50–60% 60–70%
Governor before election
Lee S. Dreyfus
Republican
Elected Governor
Anthony S. Earl
Democratic

The 1982 Wisconsin gubernatorial election was held on November 2, 1982. Democrat Anthony S. Earl won the election with 56.75% of the vote, defeating Republican Terry J. Kohler.

== Wyoming ==
1982 Wyoming gubernatorial election
- November 2, 1982
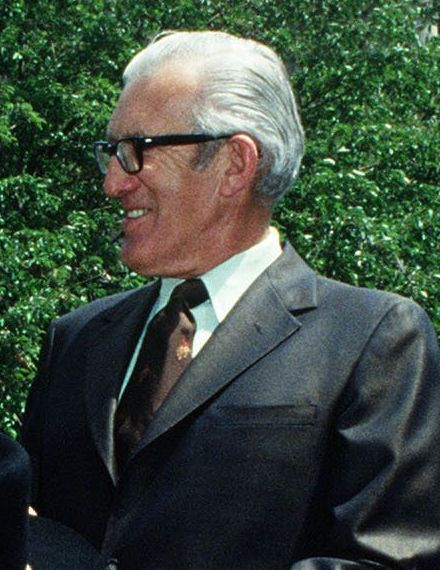

Nominee	Edgar Herschler	Warren A. Morton
Party	Democratic	Republican
Popular vote	106,427	62,128
Percentage	63.14%	36.86%
- County results Herschler: 50–60% 60–70% 70–80% Morton: 50–60%
Governor before election
Edgar Herschler
Democratic
Elected Governor
Edgar Herschler
Democratic

The 1982 Wyoming gubernatorial election took place on November 2, 1982. Incumbent Democratic Governor Edgar Herschler ran for re-election to a third term. He faced former State House Speaker Warren A. Morton in the general election after several prominent Republicans, including then-Congressman Dick Cheney, declined to challenge him. However, Herschler remained personally popular and the national political environment favored Democrats, and he had little difficulty defeating Morton to win a third term. In doing so, Herschler became the first (and, with the subsequent adoption of gubernatorial term limits, likely the last) Governor of Wyoming to win three terms in office.

== Territories and federal district ==
=== District of Columbia ===
1982 United States gubernatorial elections
- November 2, 1982
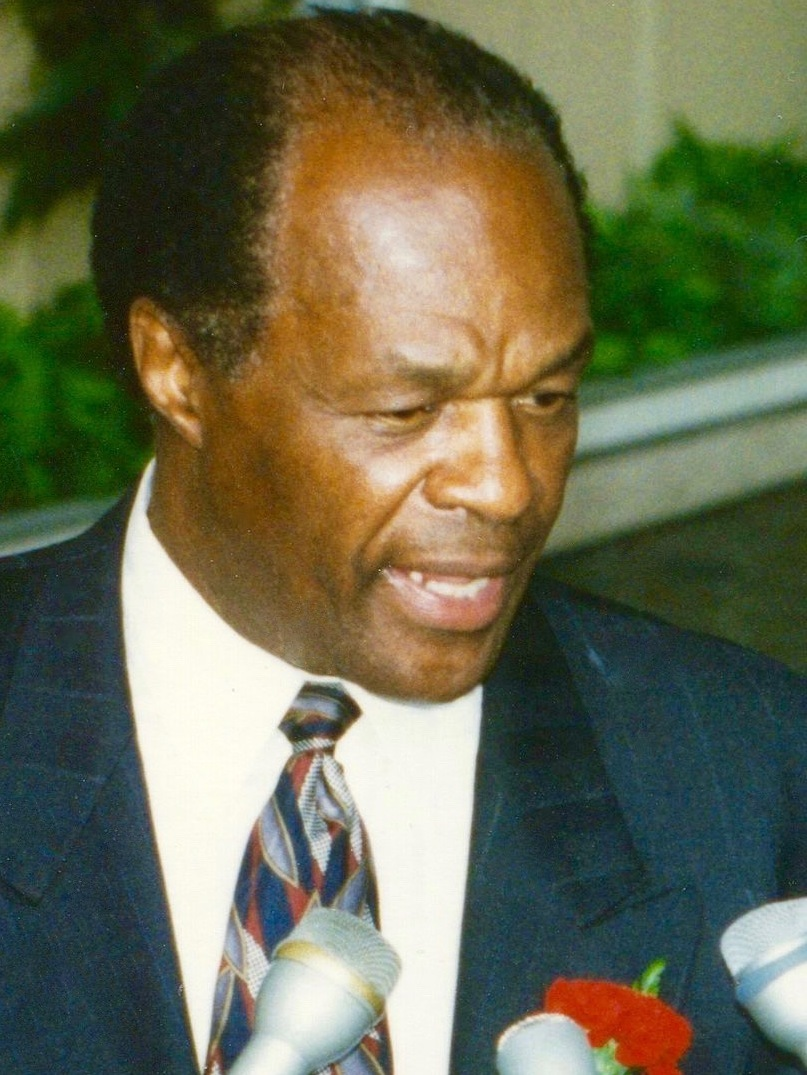

Nominee	Marion Barry	E. Brooke Lee Jr.
Party	Democratic	Republican
Popular vote	95,007	16,501
Percentage	81.0%	14.1%
Mayor before election
Marion Barry
Democratic
Elected mayor
Marion Barry
Democratic

On November 2, 1982, the District of Columbia held an election for its mayor. It resulted in the reelection of incumbent Democratic mayor Marion Barry to a second term, defeating Republican candidate E. Brooke Lee.

=== Guam ===
Guam election
Party	Candidate	Votes	%
Democratic	Ricardo Bordallo	{{{votes}}}	52.4%
Republican	Paul McDonald Calvo	{{{votes}}}	47.6%
Total votes		{{{votes}}}	100.00
Democratic gain from Republican			

=== U.S. Virgin Islands ===
U.S. Virgin Islands election
Party	Candidate	Votes	%
Independent	Juan Francisco Luis	{{{votes}}}	100%
Total votes		{{{votes}}}	100.00
Independent hold			

== See also ==
- 1982 United States elections
  - 1982 United States Senate elections
  - 1982 United States House of Representatives elections
