= 1986 Sioux Falls mayoral election =

- June 17, 1986; July 1, 1986

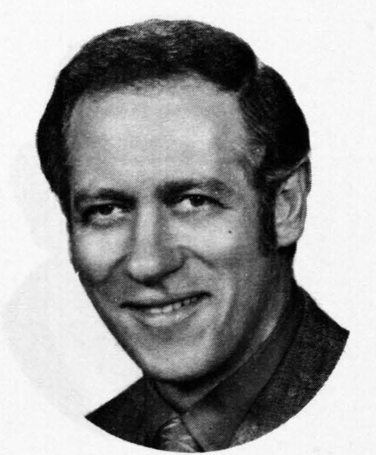

Candidate	Jack White	Mike O'Connor
First round	8,646; 37.43%	9,405; 40.72%
Runoff	12,428; 51.02%	11,932; 48.98%
Candidate	Al Brown	Lloyd M. Taplett
First round	2,863; 12.40%	1,951; 8.45%
Runoff	Eliminated	Eliminated
Mayor before election
Joe Cooper
Nonpartisan
Elected mayor
Jack White
Nonpartisan

The 1986 Sioux Falls mayoral election took place on July 1, 1986, following a primary election on June 17, 1986. On June 4, 1985, voters ratified a change to city government that expanded the size of the city commission to five and cut short the mayor's term, forcing an election in 1986 for a new five-year term. Incumbent Mayor Joe Cooper, who was elected in 1984, originally planned to seek re-election, but instead opted to run for city Public Safety Commissioner.

Former State Senator Mike O'Connor, the 1982 Democratic nominee for Governor, placed first in the primary, winning 41 percent of the vote, and faced Jack White, a real estate agent who narrowly lost the 1984 mayoral election to Cooper. White defeated O'Connor by a thin margin, winning 51–49 percent.

== Primary election ==
=== Candidates ===
- Mike O'Connor, former State Senator, 1982 Democratic nominee for Governor
- Jack White, real estate agent, 1984 candidate for Mayor
- Al Brown, anti-tax activist
- Lloyd M. Taplett, former manager of the Job Service of South Dakota Sioux Falls office
- Bob "Skippy" Blechinger, radio announcer
- Charles Nixon, businessman (deceased)

=== Results ===
1986 Sioux Falls mayoral primary election
Party	Candidate	Votes	%
Nonpartisan	Mike O'Connor	9,405	40.72%
Nonpartisan	Jack White	8,646	37.43%
Nonpartisan	Al Brown	2,863	12.40%
Nonpartisan	Lloyd M. Taplett	1,951	12.39%
Nonpartisan	Bob "Skippy" Blechinger	156	0.68%
Nonpartisan	Charles Nixon	77	0.33%
Total votes		23,098	100.00%

== General election ==
=== Results ===
1986 Sioux Falls mayoral runoff election
Party	Candidate	Votes	%
Nonpartisan	Jack White	12,428	51.02%
Nonpartisan	Mike O'Connor	11,932	48.98%
Total votes		24,360	100.00%
