= 1984 Sioux Falls mayoral election =

- April 10, 1984; April 24, 1984

Candidate	Joe Cooper	Jack White
First round	4,899; 23.14%	4,960; 23.42%
Runoff	11,770; 52.98%	10,445; 47.02%
Candidate	Don Kuck	Neal Hines
First round	4,672; 22.06%	4,613; 21.79%
Runoff	Eliminated	Eliminated
Mayor before election
Rick Knobe
Nonpartisan
Elected mayor
Joe Cooper
Nonpartisan

The 1984 Sioux Falls mayoral election took place on April 24, 1984, following a primary election on April 10, 1984. Incumbent Mayor Rick Knobe declined to run for re-election to a third term. Seven candidates ran to succeed him, producing a close primary election. Real estate agent Jack White and news anchor Joe Cooper placed first and second in the primary with 23 percent of the vote each, while insurance agent Don Kuck and businessman Neal Hines narrowly placed third and fourth with 22 percent each. In the general election, Cooper narrowly defeated White, 53-47 percent.

In 1985, voters ratified a change to the system of government, which cut Cooper's term from five years to two, forcing an early election in 1986.

== Primary election ==
=== Candidates ===
- Jack White, real estate agent
- Joe Cooper, KELO-TV news anchor
- Don Kuck, insurance agent
- Neal Hines, businessman
- Pat O'Connor, real estate agent
- Brian Burns, Southeastern Area Vocational-Technical School student
- James Kroll, retiree

=== Results ===
1984 Sioux Falls mayoral primary election
Party	Candidate	Votes	%
Nonpartisan	Jack White	4,960	23.42%
Nonpartisan	Joe Cooper	4,899	23.14%
Nonpartisan	Don Kuck	4,672	22.06%
Nonpartisan	Neal Hines	4,613	12.39%
Nonpartisan	Pat O'Connor	1,805	8.52%
Nonpartisan	Brian Burns	114	0.54%
Nonpartisan	James Kroll	112	0.53%
Total votes		21,175	100.00%

== General election ==
=== Results ===
1984 Sioux Falls mayoral runoff election
Party	Candidate	Votes	%
Nonpartisan	Joe Cooper	11,770	52.98%
Nonpartisan	Jack White	10,445	47.02%
Total votes		22,215	100.00%
