= John Fuhr =

American politician (1928–2017)

45th Speaker of the Colorado House of Representatives
- In office January 13, 1971 – January 8, 1975
- Preceded by: John D. Vanderhoof
- Succeeded by: Ruben A. Valdez

Member of the Colorado House of Representatives from the 40th district
- In office January 8, 1969 – January 8, 1975
- Preceded by: Richard G. Gebhardt
- Succeeded by: Steve Hogan

Member of the Colorado House of Representatives from the 6th district
- In office January 11, 1967 – January 8, 1969
- Preceded by: Dominic A. Coloroso
- Succeeded by: Dominic A. Coloroso

Personal details
- Born: September 9, 1928 Aledo, Illinois, U.S.
- Died: February 1, 2017 (aged 88) Spearfish, South Dakota, U.S.
- Party: Republican

John Fuhr (September 9, 1928 – February 1, 2017) was an American politician who served in the Colorado House of Representatives from 1967 to 1975. He served as Speaker of the Colorado House of Representatives from 1971 to 1975.

He died on February 1, 2017, in Spearfish, South Dakota at age 88.

Party political offices
Preceded by Ted L. Strickland	Republican nominee for Governor of Colorado; 1982	Succeeded by Ted L. Strickland
