= 1982 Colorado gubernatorial election =

- November 2, 1982
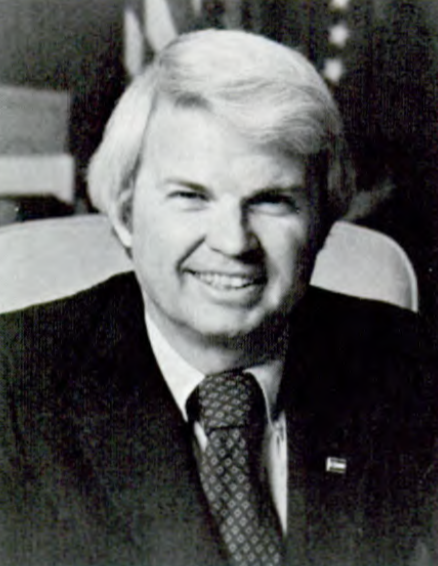

Nominee	Richard Lamm	John Fuhr
Party	Democratic	Republican
Running mate	Nancy Dick	Robert E. Denier
Popular vote	627,960	302,740
Percentage	65.69%	31.67%
- County results Lamm: 40–50% 50–60% 60–70% 70–80% 80–90% Fuhr: 40–50% 50–60%
Governor before election
Richard Lamm
Democratic
Elected Governor
Richard Lamm
Democratic

The 1982 Colorado gubernatorial election was held on November 2, 1982. Incumbent Democrat Richard Lamm defeated Republican nominee John Fuhr with 65.69% of the vote.

== Primary elections ==
Primary elections were held on September 14, 1982.

=== Democratic primary ===
==== Candidates ====
- Richard Lamm, incumbent Governor

==== Results ====
Democratic primary results
Party	Candidate	Votes	%
Democratic	Richard Lamm (incumbent)	108,034	100.00

=== Republican primary ===
==== Candidates ====
- John Fuhr, former Speaker of the Colorado House of Representatives

==== Results ====
Republican primary results
Party	Candidate	Votes	%
Republican	John Fuhr	112,340	100.00

== General election ==
=== Candidates ===
Major party candidates

- Richard Lamm, Democratic
- John Fuhr, Republican

Other candidates

- Paul K. Grant, Libertarian
- Earl F. Dodge Jr., Prohibition
- Alan Gummerson, Socialist Workers

=== Results ===
1982 Colorado gubernatorial election
Party	Candidate	Votes	%	±%
Democratic	Richard Lamm (incumbent)	627,960	65.69%	+6.93%
Republican	John Fuhr	302,740	31.67%	−6.86%
Libertarian	Paul K. Grant	19,349	2.02%	N/A
Prohibition	Earl Dodge	3,496	0.37%	+0.10%
Socialist Workers	Alan Gummerson	2,476	0.26%	−0.19%
Majority		325,220	34.02%	+13.79%
Turnout		956,021		
Democratic hold		Swing		
