= 1982 South Dakota gubernatorial election =

- November 2, 1982
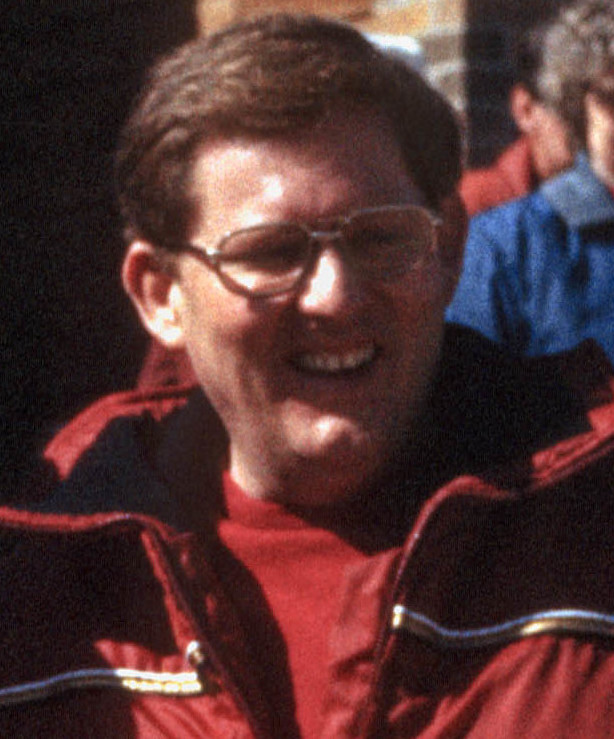

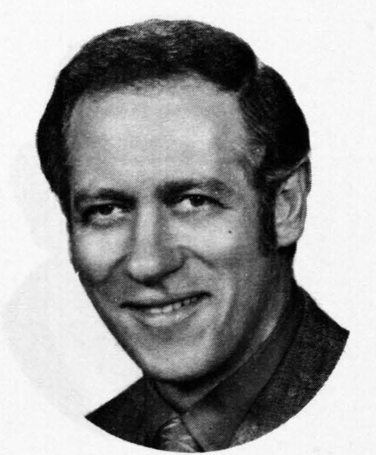
Nominee	Bill Janklow	Mike O'Connor
Party	Republican	Democratic
Running mate	Lowell Hansen	Willis Danokas
Popular vote	197,429	81,136
Percentage	70.87%	29.13%
- County results Janklow: 50–60% 60–70% 70–80% 80–90% O'Connor: 50–60% 60–70% 80–90%
Governor before election
Bill Janklow
Republican
Elected Governor
Bill Janklow
Republican

The 1982 South Dakota gubernatorial elections were held on November 2, 1982, to elect a Governor of South Dakota. Republican candidate Bill Janklow was elected, defeating Democratic nominee Mike O'Connor to take a second term in office.

== Republican primary ==
=== Candidates ===
- Bill Janklow, incumbent Governor of South Dakota

== Democratic primary ==
=== Candidates ===
- Mike O'Connor, member of the South Dakota State Senate
- Elvern Varilek

=== Results ===
Democratic primary results
Party	Candidate	Votes	%
Democratic	Mike O'Connor	24,101	58.76
Democratic	Elvern Varilek	16,916	41.24
Total votes		41,017	100.00

== General election ==
=== Results ===
South Dakota gubernatorial election, 1982
Party	Candidate	Votes	%
Republican	Bill Janklow (inc.)	197,429	70.87
Democratic	Mike O'Connor	81,136	29.13
Majority		116,293	41.74%
Turnout		278,565	
Republican hold			
