= Michael J. O'Connor (politician) =

American politician

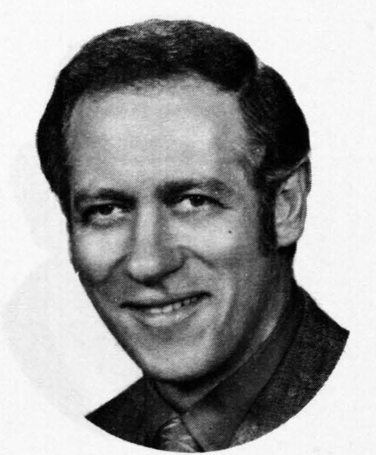

Member of the South Dakota House of Representatives
- In office 1971–1972

Member of the South Dakota Senate from the 11th district
- In office 1973–1977
- In office 1981–1982

Personal details
- Born: December 15, 1928 Sioux Falls, South Dakota, U.S.
- Died: October 24, 2018 (aged 89) Sioux Falls, South Dakota, U.S.
- Party: Democratic
- Spouse: Barbara
- Children: four
- Education: Augustana University
- Profession: printing executive

Michael J. O'Connor (December 15, 1928 – October 24, 2018) was an American politician in the state of South Dakota. He was a member of the South Dakota House of Representatives and South Dakota State Senate. He was President Pro Tempore of the Senate from 1975 to 1976.

O'Connor was an alumnus of Augustana College and was a printing executive and owner of O'Connor Printers. O'Connor was a farmer. He served in the United States Marine Corps. O'Connor also served on the Minnehaha County Commission. O'Connor died at the Sioux Falls VA Hospital in Sioux Falls, South Dakota.

Party political offices
Preceded by Roger D. McKellips	Democratic nominee for Governor of South Dakota; 1982	Succeeded by Lars Herseth
