= Scott McCallum =

American politician (born 1950)

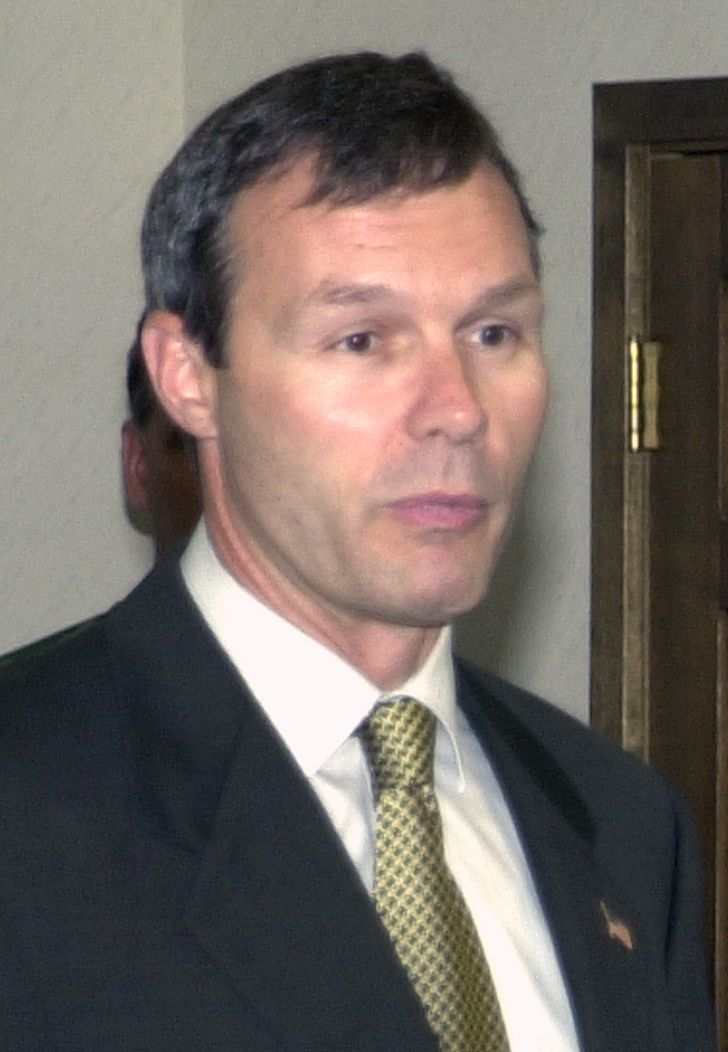
- McCallum in 2001

43rd Governor of Wisconsin
- In office February 1, 2001 – January 6, 2003
- Lieutenant: Margaret Farrow
- Preceded by: Tommy Thompson
- Succeeded by: Jim Doyle

41st Lieutenant Governor of Wisconsin
- In office January 5, 1987 – February 1, 2001
- Governor: Tommy Thompson
- Preceded by: James Flynn
- Succeeded by: Margaret Farrow

32nd Chair of the National Lieutenant Governors Association
- In office 1991–1992
- Preceded by: Jim Folsom Jr.
- Succeeded by: Frank O'Bannon

Member of the Wisconsin Senate from the 18th district
- In office January 6, 1977 – January 5, 1987
- Preceded by: Walter G. Hollander
- Succeeded by: Carol Roessler

Personal details
- Born: James Scott McCallum; May 2, 1950 (age 76) Fond du Lac, Wisconsin, U.S.
- Party: Republican
- Spouse: Laurie McCallum
- Children: 3
- Education: Macalester College (BA); Johns Hopkins University (MA); University of Wisconsin, Milwaukee (PhD)

James Scott McCallum (born May 2, 1950) is an American businessman and former politician. A member of the Republican Party, he was the 43rd governor of Wisconsin, ascending from the lieutenant governorship when Tommy Thompson resigned in 2001 to accept appointment as U.S. Secretary of Health and Human Services. Prior to becoming governor, McCallum served 14 years as Thompson's lieutenant governor and 10 years in the Wisconsin State Senate.

== Early life and education ==
James Scott McCallum was born in Fond du Lac, Wisconsin, the eldest of four children. His father worked as a construction worker and his mother was a homemaker and bank teller. In 1967, he attended a youth leadership program, Badger Boys State, as a representative chosen from Lowell P. Goodrich High School.

He graduated from Macalester College in 1972 with a degree in economics and political science. He earned his master's degree in international economics from Johns Hopkins University in 1974. He earned a PhD from the University of Wisconsin-Milwaukee. He is of the Christian Science faith. McCallum is married to Laurie McCallum; they have three children and reside in Lodi, Wisconsin.

== Political career ==
=== Early career ===
In 1976 at the age of 26, McCallum won a seat in the Wisconsin State Senate, defeating a 20-year incumbent. McCallum won the Republican nomination for the United States Senate in 1982, but lost in the general election to incumbent William Proxmire. During his 10 years (1976–1986) as state senator, McCallum was allied with the New Republican Conference, a now-defunct movement of fiscally conservative, but socially liberal, GOP activists. McCallum's legislative accomplishments included increasing penalties for drunk driving offenses and assaults on prison guards; creating a health insurance risk pool for people considered uninsurable; sunsetting outdated legislation; and indexing individual income taxes to account for inflation.

=== Lieutenant Governor and Governor of Wisconsin ===
In 1986, McCallum ran for lieutenant governor on the Republican ticket with Tommy Thompson, who was running for governor; both candidates won. McCallum chaired the National Council of Lieutenant Governors and was appointed to the Environmental Protection Agency's advisory council by President George H. W. Bush. The Thompson-McCallum ticket served the state of Wisconsin for 14 years, having been reelected in 1990, 1994 and 1998. In 2001, President George W. Bush appointed Thompson to be Secretary of Health and Human Services. McCallum thus served out the final two years of Thompson's fourth term, and appointed State Senator Margaret Farrow of Pewaukee, Wisconsin, to be the state's first female lieutenant governor.

As the Wisconsin governor, an editorial at the The Wall Street Journal praised McCallum during the economic slowdown in 2001, saying he was one of the 'political tough guys' for balancing the budget without raising taxes. As a governor he was commander-in-chief of the Wisconsin National Guard, directing emergency operations following the September 11 attacks.

In 2001, McCallum launched "Invest Wisconsin," a new program to focus on the needs of state businesses and communities for investment capital. The public and private partnership was designed to increase awareness of business financing options by engaging statewide networks and professional associations.

As governor he created the Department of Electronic Government and the state's first CIO through consolidation of various departments. Today, the department is known as the "Division of Enterprise Technology" of the Wisconsin Department of Administration.

Governor McCallum aggressively used the veto pen to cut expenditures throughout his time in office. His office claimed that he saved Wisconsin taxpayers $62.9 million through this action. McCallum ran for a full term in 2002, but was defeated in the election by Democratic Attorney General Jim Doyle. The other major party candidate running in 2002 was Libertarian Ed Thompson (brother of Tommy Thompson).

=== Post-governor career ===
After leaving office, McCallum joined the Discovery Institute, a politically conservative think tank, in 2004. He was president and CEO of Aidmatrix for nine years. Aidmatrix is a non-profit based in Texas that matches charitable corporate donations of surplus food and supplies with organizations that need them.

He is also an adjunct professor and honorary fellow in the School of Public Health and Medicine at the University of Wisconsin–Madison. McCallum has also taught executive MBA marketing courses at Sun Yat-sen University and Harbin University. McCallum is now an adjunct professor of Public Affairs at the University of Wisconsin-Madison's La Follette School of Public Affairs and the University of Wisconsin-Milwaukee.

In March 2013, McCallum was named by Government Technology magazine as one of the "Top 25 Doers, Dreamers, and Drivers" in US technology. McCallum has also received the 21st Century Achievement Award from Computerworld, the Distinguished Citizen Award from Macalester College, and the Ernst and Young Entrepreneur of the Year Award.

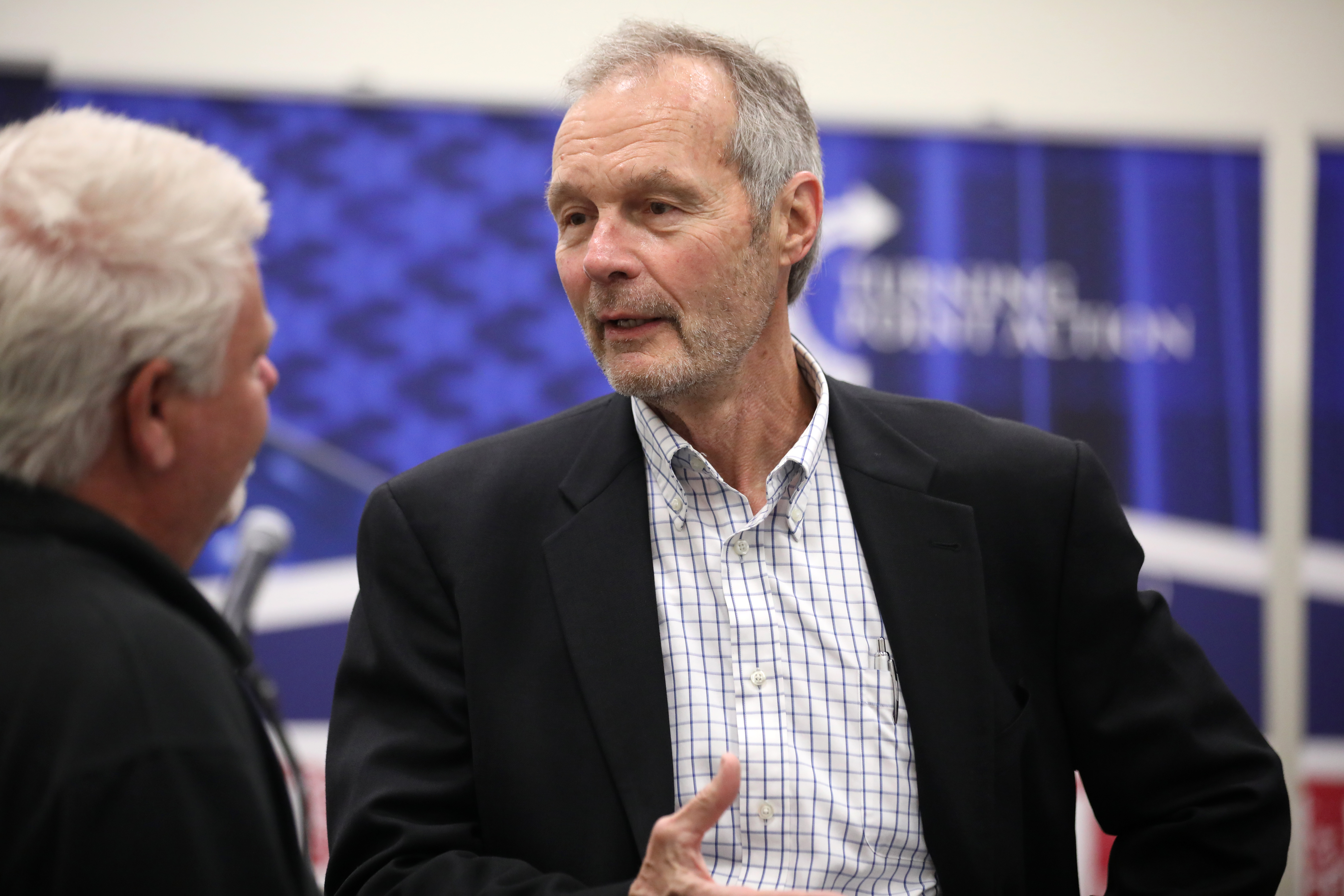
McCallum in 2024

In 2024, in partnership with the Carter Center and journalist David Haynes, McCallum launched the Wisconsin Alliance for Civic Trust, or WisACT. Among its goals are training in media literacy, conflict resolution, and reducing political polarization.

== Electoral history ==
=== Wisconsin Senate (1976, 1980) ===
1976 Wisconsin Senate election, 18th district
Party	Candidate	Votes	%	±%
Primary election, September 14, 1976
Republican	Scott McCallum	8,102	40.38%	
Republican	Walter G. Hollander (incumbent)	8,019	39.97%	
Republican	Edward H. Hoban	795	3.96%	
Democratic	Daniel L. Klawitter	3,148	15.69%	
Total votes		'20,064'	'100.0%'	
General election, November 2, 1976
Republican	Scott McCallum	39,194	66.14%	
Democratic	Daniel L. Klawitter	20,062	33.86%	
Total votes		'59,256'	'100.0%'	
Republican hold				

1980 Wisconsin Senate election, 18th district
Party	Candidate	Votes	%	±%
Primary election, September 9, 1980
Republican	Scott McCallum (incumbent)	11,723	100.0%	
Total votes		'11,723'	'100.0%'	
General election, November 4, 1980
Republican	Scott McCallum (incumbent)	47,647	100.0%	
Total votes		'47,647'	'100.0%'	−19.59%
Republican hold				

=== United States Senate (1982) ===
1982 United States Senate election in Wisconsin
Party	Candidate	Votes	%	±%
Primary election, September 14, 1982
Democratic	William Proxmire (incumbent)	467,214	57.39%	
Republican	Scott McCallum	182,043	22.36%	
Republican	Paul Thomas Brewer	86,728	10.65%	
Democratic	Marcel Dandeneau	75,258	9.24%	
Libertarian	George Liljenfeldt	1,421	0.17%	
Constitution	Sanford G. Knapp	1,397	0.17%	
Total votes		'814,061'	'100.0%'	
General election, November 2, 1982
Democratic	William Proxmire (incumbent)	983,311	63.65%	
Republican	Scott McCallum	527,355	34.14%	
Labor–Farm	William Osborne Hart	21,807	1.41%	
Libertarian	George Liljenfeldt	7,947	0.51%	
Constitution	Sanford G. Knapp	4,463	0.29%	
Total votes		'1,544,883'	'100.0%'	
Democratic hold				

=== Wisconsin Senate (1984) ===
1984 Wisconsin Senate election, 18th district
Party	Candidate	Votes	%	±%
Primary election, September 11, 1984
Republican	Scott McCallum (incumbent)	6,385	59.24%	
Democratic	Peg Lautenschlager	3,733	34.64%	
Democratic	John Daggett	660	6.12%	
Total votes		'10,778'	'100.0%'	
General election, November 6, 1984
Republican	Scott McCallum (incumbent)	34,296	54.03%	
Democratic	Peg Lautenschlager	29,177	45.97%	
Total votes		'63,473'	'100.0%'	+33.22%
Republican hold				

=== Wisconsin Lieutenant Governor (1986–1998) ===
1986 Wisconsin gubernatorial election
Party	Candidate	Votes	%	±%
Lieutenant Governor primary election, September 9, 1986
Republican	Scott McCallum	134,099	26.08%	
Democratic	Sharon K. Metz	101,753	19.79%	
Republican	Patricia A. Goodrich	65,628	12.76%	
Democratic	Gervase Hephner	52,313	19.79%	
Republican	Robert Nolan	51,836	10.08%	
Democratic	Cletus J. Johnson	50,795	9.88%	
Democratic	Taylor Benson	29,353	5.71%	
Republican	Drew W. Heiden	19,451	3.78%	
Democratic	Arlyn F. Wollenburg	7,984	1.55%	
Labor–Farm	John Ervin Bergum	1,012	0.20%	
Total votes		'514,224'	'100.0%'	
General election, November 4, 1986
Republican	Tommy Thompson Scott McCallum	805,090	52.74%	+10.80%
Democratic	Tony Earl (incumbent) Sharon K. Metz	705,578	46.22%	−10.53%
Labor–Farm	Kathryn A. Christensen John Ervin Bergum	10,323	0.68%	
Independent	Darold E. Wall Irma L. Lotts	3,913	0.26%	
Independent	Sanford Knapp Verdell Hallingstad	1,668	0.11%	
	Scattering	1	0.00%	
Total votes		'1,526,573'	'100.0%'	−3.40%
Republican gain from Democratic				

=== Wisconsin Governor (2002) ===
2002 Wisconsin gubernatorial election
Party	Candidate	Votes	%	±%
General election, November 5, 2002
Democratic	Jim Doyle	800,515	45.09%	+6.39%
Republican	Scott McCallum (incumbent)	734,779	41.39%	−18.28%
Libertarian	Ed Thompson	185,455	10.45%	+9.82%
Green	Jim Young	44,111	2.48%	+2.48%
Reform	Alan D. Eisenberg	2,847	0.16%	
Independent	Ty A. Bollerud	2,637	0.15%	
Independent	Mike Managan	1,710	0.10%	
Independent	Aneb Jah Rasta	929	0.05%	
	Scattering	2,366	0.13%	
Plurality		65,736	3.71%	−17.27%
Turnout		1,775,349	45.43%	+1.10%
Democratic gain from Republican				

== See also ==
- Northeast Wisconsin Economic Development Partnership

Party political offices
Preceded by Stanley York	Republican nominee for U.S. Senator from Wisconsin (Class 1); 1982	Succeeded by Susan Engeleiter
Preceded by Russell Olson	Republican nominee for Lieutenant Governor of Wisconsin; 1986, 1990, 1994, 1998	Succeeded by Margaret Farrow
Preceded by Tommy Thompson	Republican nominee for Governor of Wisconsin; 2002	Succeeded by Mark Green
Political offices
Preceded by James Flynn	Lieutenant Governor of Wisconsin; 1987–2001	Succeeded by Margaret Farrow
Preceded by Tommy Thompson	Governor of Wisconsin; 2001–2003	Succeeded by Jim Doyle
U.S. order of precedence (ceremonial)
Preceded by Martin J. Schreiber as Former Governor	Order of precedence of the United States	Succeeded by Jim Doyle as Former Governor
