= Tommy Thompson =

American politician (born 1941)

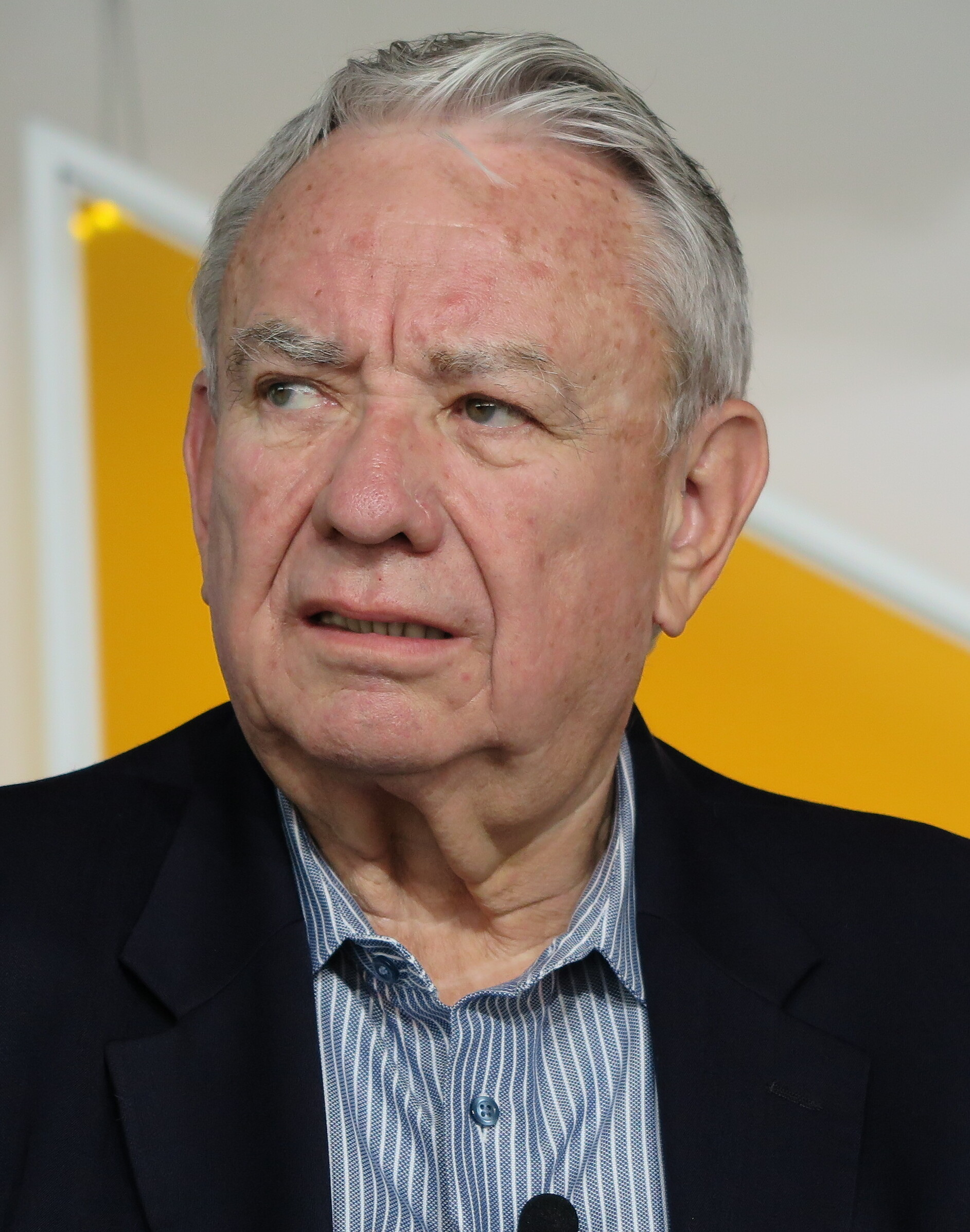
- Thompson in 2015

President of the University of Wisconsin System
- Acting
- In office July 1, 2020 – March 18, 2022
- Preceded by: Ray Cross
- Succeeded by: Mike Falbo (acting)

19th United States Secretary of Health and Human Services
- In office February 2, 2001 – January 26, 2005
- President: George W. Bush
- Preceded by: Donna Shalala
- Succeeded by: Mike Leavitt

Chair of the National Governors Association
- In office August 1, 1995 – July 16, 1996
- Preceded by: Howard Dean
- Succeeded by: Bob Miller

42nd Governor of Wisconsin
- In office January 5, 1987 – February 1, 2001
- Lieutenant: Scott McCallum
- Preceded by: Tony Earl
- Succeeded by: Scott McCallum

Minority Leader of the Wisconsin State Assembly
- In office December 17, 1981 – January 5, 1987
- Preceded by: John C. Shabaz
- Succeeded by: Betty Jo Nelsen

Member of the Wisconsin State Assembly
- In office January 2, 1967 – January 5, 1987
- Preceded by: Louis C. Romell
- Succeeded by: Ben Brancel
- Constituency: Adams-Juneau-Marquette district (1967–1973); 79th district (1973–1983); 87th district (1983–1985); 42nd district (1985–1987)

Personal details
- Born: Tommy George Thompson; November 19, 1941 (age 84) Elroy, Wisconsin, U.S.
- Party: Republican
- Spouse: Sue Mashak (m. 1968)
- Relatives: Ed Thompson (brother)
- Education: University of Wisconsin, Madison (BA, JD)

Military service
- Allegiance: United States
- Branch/service: United States Army; Wisconsin Army National Guard; United States Army Reserve
- Years of service: 1966–1972 (ARNG); 1972–1976 (USAR)
- Rank: Captain

Tommy George Thompson (born November 19, 1941) is an American politician who served as the 19th United States secretary of health and human services from 2001 to 2005 under President George W. Bush. A member of the Republican Party, he was the 42nd governor of Wisconsin from 1987 to 2001 and Republican floor leader in the Wisconsin State Assembly from 1981 to 1987. Thompson is the longest-serving governor in Wisconsin history and is the only person to be elected to the office four times.

During his tenure as governor, Thompson also served as chair of Amtrak, the nation's passenger rail service, chairman of the Republican Governors Association in 1991 and 1992, and chairman of the National Governors Association in 1995 and 1996. After his time in the Bush administration, Thompson became a partner in the law firm Akin Gump and independent chairman of Deloitte's Center for Health Solutions. He has served on the boards of 22 other organizations. Thompson most recently served as interim president of the University of Wisconsin System from 2020 to 2022.

Thompson sought the Republican presidential nomination in 2008, but withdrew from the primaries before voting began. He was the Republican nominee in the 2012 United States Senate election in Wisconsin, vying to replace retiring senator Herb Kohl, but was defeated by Democrat Tammy Baldwin in what was his only statewide election loss.

== Early life, education, and military service ==
Thompson was born in Elroy, Wisconsin. His mother, Julie (née Dutton), was a teacher, and his father, Allan Thompson, owned and ran a gas station and country grocery store. His brother, the late Ed Thompson, was a mayor of Tomah, Wisconsin, and was the Libertarian Party nominee for governor of Wisconsin in 2002. He has a daughter, Kelli Thompson, who was the lead Wisconsin state public defender from 2011 to 2023.

Thompson earned his bachelor and Juris Doctor degrees from the University of Wisconsin–Madison in 1963 and 1966, respectively. While in law school, Thompson was elected chairman of the Madison Young Republicans.

Thompson held a student deferment from military service during the Vietnam War until he completed law school in June 1966. The following year, 1966, Thompson enlisted in the National Guard. After completing six years in the National Guard, Thompson served in the Army Reserves for another four years. His final rank was captain.

== Early political career (1966–1987) ==
=== Wisconsin Assembly ===
Immediately after completing law school in 1966, Thompson ran for the Wisconsin State Assembly. In the Republican primary, he defeated incumbent Assemblyman Louis Romell by 635 votes, after Romell had underestimated the challenge Thompson represented.

In 1973, Thompson became the Assembly's assistant minority leader and its minority leader in 1981. Thompson aggressively used parliamentary procedure to block bills favored by the Democratic majority and stop legislative progress, earning him the nickname "Dr. No" by the frustrated majority.

=== American Legislative Exchange Council ===
As a state legislator, Thompson was involved in the early years of the American Legislative Exchange Council (ALEC), a conservative legislative organization. Speaking at a 2002 ALEC meeting, Thompson stated: "I always loved going to [ALEC] meetings because I always found new ideas. Then I'd take them back to Wisconsin, disguise them a little bit, and declare, 'That's mine.'" ALEC awarded Thompson its "Thomas Jefferson Award" in 1991.

=== 1979 congressional campaign ===
While Thompson was Assistant Minority Leader in the Assembly, incumbent Republican U.S. Congressman William Steiger of Wisconsin's 6th congressional district died at the age of 40 from a heart attack. Thompson was one of seven Republican candidates who ran to replace Steiger in the special election in 1979. State Senator Tom Petri won the primary and general elections and represented the 6th district until his retirement in January 2015.

== Governor of Wisconsin (1987–2001) ==
Thompson served as the 42nd Governor of Wisconsin, having been elected to an unprecedented four terms. As of April 2013, Thompson has the tenth longest gubernatorial tenure in post-Constitutional U.S. history at 5,141 days.

=== Elections ===
1986

Thompson decided to run for Governor of Wisconsin in 1986 against incumbent Democrat Anthony Earl. He ran and won the Republican primary with 52% of the vote in a five candidate field. He defeated Earl 53%–46%.

1990

Thompson won election to a second term defeating Democrat Thomas Loftus, the Speaker of the Wisconsin State Assembly, 58%–42%.

1994

Thompson won election to a third term defeating Democratic state senator Chuck Chvala 67%–31%. He won every county in the state except Menominee County.

1998

Thompson won election to a fourth term defeating Democrat Ed Garvey, a Wisconsin Deputy Attorney General, 60%–39%.

=== Tenure ===
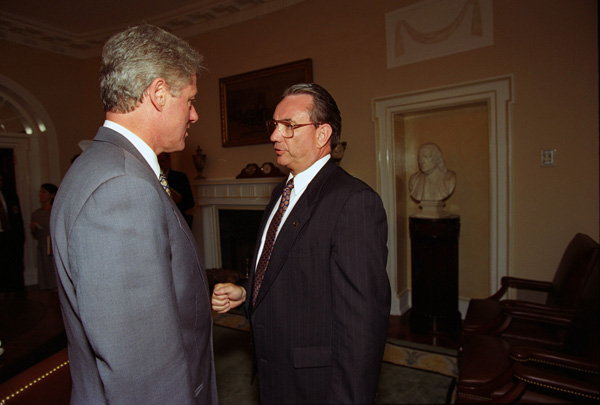
Then-Governor Thompson meets President Bill Clinton, 1993

Thompson is best known nationally for changes in Wisconsin's welfare system, which was radically downsized, before similar ideas were adopted nationally. Under his leadership, Wisconsin reduced its welfare rolls by almost 90%, cutting welfare spending but increasing investments in child care and health care, especially for low-income working families.

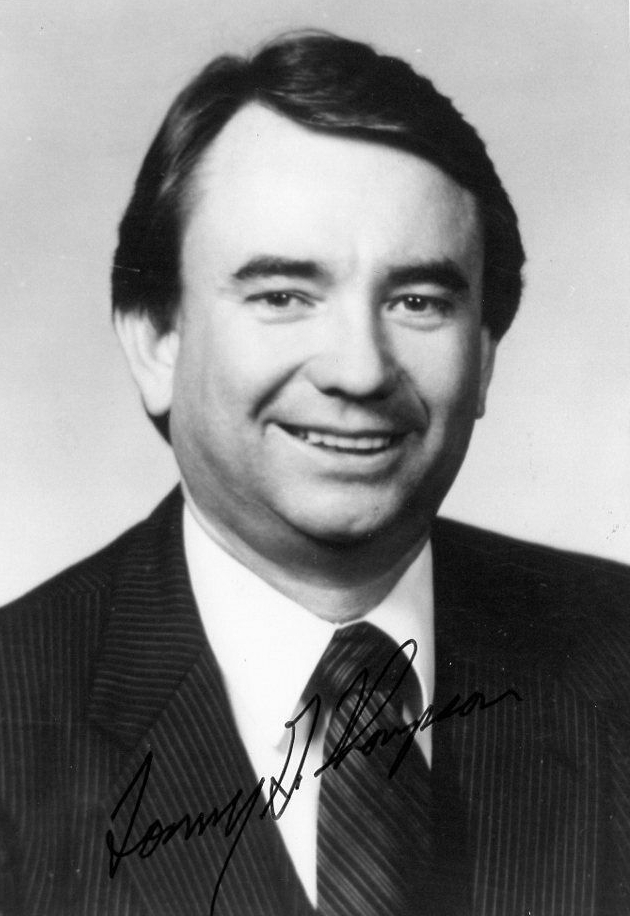
Thompson as governor

Thompson was called a "pioneer" for two key initiatives of his governorship, the Wisconsin Works welfare reform (sometimes called W-2) and school vouchers. In 1990 Thompson pushed for the creation of the country's first parental school-choice program, which provided Milwaukee families with a voucher to send children to the private or public school of their choice. He created the BadgerCare program, designed to provide health coverage to those families whose employers don't provide health insurance but make too much money to qualify for Medicaid. Through the federal waiver program, Thompson helped replicate this program in several states when he became Secretary of Health and Human Services.

Thompson was well known for his extensive use of the veto, particularly his sweeping line-item veto powers. At the time, Wisconsin governors had the power to strike out words, numbers, and even entire sentences from appropriations bills. In his first two terms alone, he used the line-item veto 1,500 times to cancel a total of $150 million in spending; none of these vetoes were overridden.

Thompson's welfare reform policies were criticized. Wendell Primus of the Center on Budget and Policy Priorities wrote that "many families have actually lost ground even though they are no longer on welfare". Many of Wisconsin's poor remained well below the federal poverty line. In addition, slightly more of the state's poorest children reportedly lacked health insurance than before Thompson's welfare overhaul.

The growth of the state budget during Thompson's 14-year tenure became a subject of attacks on his record as governor later by conservative opponents in the 2012 U.S. Senate primary.

==== Transportation focus ====
Thompson is a rail enthusiast, and was a supporter of mass transit, which earned him distrust on the issue from other Republicans. Prior to being selected as HHS Secretary, Thompson made clear that his first choice in the Bush Administration would be secretary of transportation.

While governor, Thompson was appointed to the Amtrak Board of Directors by President Bill Clinton, served as chairman, and had an Amtrak locomotive named for him from 2001 through 2006, when his name was removed from the side of the locomotive as part of a routine overhaul.

Beginning in the 1990s, Thompson proposed modernizing passenger rail in the state. In 1999, Thompson proposed a modernization and extension of the Hiawatha rail service (between Chicago and Milwaukee), extending to beyond Milwaukee to also serve Madison, Wisconsin and Minnesota's Twin Cities (Minneapolis–Saint Paul). Thompson was promoting the "Midwest Rail Initiative" in his capacity as Amtrak's chairman, which included a proposal for a line connecting these cities. In early 2000, he gave further details, proposing first to establish new service between Milwaukee and Madison with $50 million in state funding and $100 million in federal funding, hoping to inaugurate a high-speed service by 2003, which would include a station at Dane County Regional Airport. As part of his plans, Thompson initiated preliminary studies that resulted in the construction of the Milwaukee Airport Rail Station.

==== Taxes ====
In 1996, Thompson bragged that he never raised taxes in Wisconsin. Thompson claimed to cut taxes 91 times—including eliminating the estate tax in 1987, cutting income tax rates three times and a $1.2 billion property tax cut in 1995.

When Thompson made the same claim, in 2012, that he "never raised taxes", he earned a rating of "False" from PolitiFact-Wisconsin. PolitiFact found numerous examples of taxes that had increased during Thompson's terms. Politifact said in its rating, "Thompson has a long list of taxes he cut and, on balance, he can claim to have reduced taxes. But he also raised some specific taxes along the way." Politifact rated Mostly True Thompson's claim that Wisconsin's overall tax burden went down while he served as governor from 1987 to 2001.

Two of the tax increases that Thompson did fight, using the Wisconsin governor's partial-veto power, were taxes on the state's wealthiest residents. In a budget bill in 1987, Thompson vetoed two tax increases on capital gains and the alternative minimum tax, that would have largely affected the wealthy, at the same time that he pushed forward a 6% cut in welfare benefits.

==== Executive power consolidation ====
As governor, Thompson took major steps to transfer decision-making power from elected constitutional officers and independent agencies to his political appointees. Among the changes:

- The Secretary of State's office was gutted of its responsibilities concerning business registration and Uniform Commercial Code administration. These functions were in turn vested in Thompson's appointee at the newly created Department of Financial Institutions, which also regulates depository institutions and the securities industry.
- Enforcement of consumer protection laws was taken away from the elected Wisconsin Attorney General and transferred to Thompson's appointee at what is now the Department of Agriculture, Trade and Consumer Protection.
- The Wisconsin Office of Public Intervenor, which for decades prior functioned as an ombudsman for the state's natural resources protected under the Public Trust Doctrine, had its budget significantly reduced, shrinking its staff and eliminating its power to sue in environmental cases; Thompson effectively shifted these powers to an appointed natural resources secretary.
- An attempt was made to transfer education policy to an appointed education secretary after the constitutional head of the Wisconsin Department of Public Instruction, the elected Superintendent of Public Instruction of Wisconsin, saw most of the office's powers gutted. The Wisconsin Supreme Court later ruled the move unconstitutional.

Thompson also had two other acts overturned by the courts as unconstitutional. His plan to include church schools in his school voucher plan was found unconstitutional. Thompson also insisted on keeping Good Friday as a half-holiday for state workers, "despite a clear ruling" from the Seventh Circuit, earning a rebuke from the court.

==== Tobacco ====
As governor, Thompson was friendly to tobacco interests. His campaign accepted tens of thousands of dollars in campaign contributions and trips from Philip Morris. He also vetoed a tobacco excise tax and "delayed authorizing the state attorney general to join other state[s] in a lawsuit against cigarette manufacturers.

==== Abortion ====
Thompson is Catholic and opposes abortion. His support for legislation in Wisconsin restricting abortions led Planned Parenthood, NARAL, and other pro-choice groups to oppose his nomination to head HHS.

=== Treatment of Ojibwa spearfishers ===
In 1983, the U.S. Court of Appeals for the Seventh Circuit issued its "Voigt Decision", which found that Wisconsin's Ojibwa tribe had a treaty-guaranteed right to engage in traditional spearfishing off-reservation and that the state of Wisconsin was prohibited from regulating fishing on Ojibwa land. The decision was upheld by the Supreme Court of the United States in 1983.

During his 1986 gubernatorial campaign, Thompson suggested abrogating the Ojibwa's rights. Once in office, Thompson called on two Ojibwa tribes to sell their treaty-guaranteed rights: the Lac du Flambeau Band of Lake Superior Chippewa, for $42 million, and the Mole Lake Band of Lake Superior Chippewa, for $10 million. Thompson's administration tried an unsuccessful legal challenge to the "Voigt Decision". The State of Wisconsin argued that Native Americans' lives were in danger from protesters if they continued spearfishing.

In 1989, federal judge Barbara Crabb ruled against the Thompson Administration's legal efforts. The judge rebuked the state for attempting to avoid violence by punishing the Ojibwa, since it was violence by non-Native American protesters that was the threatened danger. Crabb issued an injunction against violent anti-spearfishing protests in 1991, and made it permanent in 1992. On May 20, 1991, the Thompson administration declared it would no longer attempt to appeal the 1983 Voight Decision.

=== Other leadership roles ===
During his time as governor, Thompson served as chairman of the National Governors Association and the Education Commission of the States, in addition to the Council of State Governments, the Republican Governors Association, the Council of Great Lakes Governors, and the Midwestern Governors Association.

=== Reputation as governor ===
In June 1989, Wisconsin journalist Bruce Murphy opined, "Time and again, his opponents have taken him too lightly… He has proved an energetic, hard-working governor and enthusiastic state cheerleader." In October 2003, Wisconsin journalist Tom Bamberger opined that Thompson had thrived at earning himself important political allies, but had failed at originating good original ideas for governance. In March 2001, Wisconsin journalist Bruce Murphy opined,

Thompson entered the governor’s mansion in 1987 with the faint air of a rube from Elroy, an arch-conservative who would slash spending. He leaves for Washington D.C. as a tax-loving empire builder, a masterful politician whose breathtakingly activist style might have left FDR weeping for joy.

Thompson was reputed to be a poor public speaker. The view of Thompson as having weak speaking skills was present from the start of his governorship, with Wisconsin journalist quipping in a January 1987 arricle, "now that he is safely in the governor’s chair, participles will be an endangered species, so often will they go unundangled. No metaphor will go unmixed or negative undoubled, and the mind reels at the fate of adverbs."

=== Consideration as prospective Republican vice presidential nominee ===
Thompson's name had been in the press as a possible vice presidential pick during several election seasons. By 1992, Thompson himself had openly discussed his desire to be the Republican vice presidential nominee for 1996.

Republican presidential nominee Bob Dole considered Thompson as a possible vice presidential nominee in 1996 and Thompson openly lobbied for the position. However, Thompson was forced to fight off perceptions of being someone to "bluster through a speech, turn bombastic during public statements", and have difficulty thinking on his feet. During the 1996 vetting process, Dole also reportedly remarked on Thompson's lack of finesse in their interactions. After Dole disclosed that Thompson was no longer under consideration in August, Thompson stated that he was relieved because he had been "scared to death" of the process and the spotlight of the position. In 2000, Thompson was mentioned as a possible vice presidential running mate for George W. Bush.

== Secretary of Health and Human Services ==
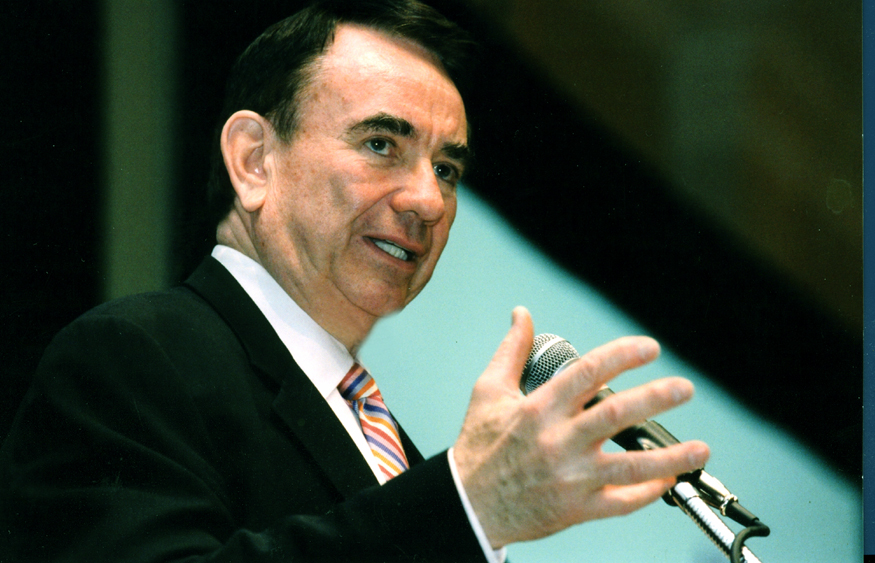
Thompson at the 2004 HealthierUS summit

Thompson left the governorship when he was appointed by President George W. Bush as HHS Secretary. He was confirmed by the Senate on January 24, 2001. Thompson announced his resignation from HHS on December 3, 2004, and served until January 26, 2005, when the Senate confirmed his successor, Michael O. Leavitt.

While Secretary, he launched initiatives to increase funding for the National Institutes of Health, reorganize the Centers for Medicare & Medicaid Services to encourage greater responsiveness and efficiency, and clear the backlog of waivers and state plan amendments. He approved 1,400 state plans and waiver requests, thereby providing health insurance to 1.8 million lower-income Americans. In the aftermath of 9/11, he also worked on strengthening the nation's preparedness for a bio-terrorism attack, by stockpiling smallpox vaccines and investing heavily in state and local public health infrastructure.

=== Key initiatives ===
Thompson's major initiatives were "efforts to strengthen U.S. preparedness for a bioterrorism attack, increase funding for the National Institutes of Health, expand health insurance coverage to lower-income Americans, and focus attention on health problems such as obesity and diabetes." He also was elected chairman of the Global Fund to Fight AIDS, Tuberculosis and Malaria in 2003.

=== Medicare prescription drug-benefit ===
Thompson was one of the key architects of the 2003 passage of Bush's Medicare Modernization Act, which was slated to provide public funding for prescription drugs for Medicare recipients starting in 2006. On the prescription drug-benefit issue, the major piece of health care legislation of President Bush's first term, Thompson frequently served as the president's point man. National analysts cite the passage of Medicare reform as the most important achievement of Thompson's tenure as HHS secretary.

As part of the debate over the adoption of Medicare Part D, Thompson was involved in a dispute over whether the Center for Medicare and Medicaid Services had to share cost estimates to Congress for legislation that would create a prescription drug benefit. Critics accused Thompson and HHS of downplaying the true cost of the law by $150 billion. CMS Administrator Tom Scully threatened to fire a CMS actuary if he revealed to Congress his estimate. Investigators determined that the data was improperly hidden from Congress, but did not conclude whether laws had been broken. In 2011 the trustees of Medicare found that the prescription drug benefit had come in 40% below estimates, the Congressional Budget Office (using different budgeting numbers) determined that the program had come in 28% below projections.

In her Senate campaign, Rep. Tammy Baldwin (D-WI) said in 2012 that Thompson was responsible for forbidding Medicare to negotiate drug prices, a statement that Politifact rated as "True." Thompson said that he had nothing to do with that provision, a statement Politifact rated as "False." The New York Times reported, "In December (2004), just before leaving office, Mr. Leavitt’s predecessor, Tommy G. Thompson, said he wished Congress had given him the authority to negotiate prices for Medicare beneficiaries, as he negotiated discounts on antibiotics during the anthrax scare of 2001."

=== 2001 anthrax scare ===
Early in his term, Thompson faced an emergency situation with the 2001 anthrax attacks. Thompson was given poor marks for seeming "utterly overtaken by events" and issuing "early statements that the government was prepared to deal with any biological emergency [that] never squared with the facts".

At a White House briefing following the first anthrax death of the scare, Thompson made a statement to the press that "would be cited for years afterward as a historic blunder in crisis communication". Thompson offered the media a "far-fetched" suggestion that the individual who died had come into contact with anthrax from drinking water from a creek. Thompson's words were criticized by a range of experts as unwarranted, as potentially undermining public confidence, and as the "kind of statements that lead to mistrust of officials and experts". Thompson was also faulted for positioning himself as the voice of the Administration to the public on this issue, having had no formal training in medicine or public health.

=== Alleged politicizing of science ===
In 2001, early in his term as Secretary of Health and Human Services, Thompson's office rejected 19 of 26 people, including a Nobel laureate, recommended for seats on the advisory board for the NIH developing nations unit by the unit's director. In return, Thompson's office sent back to the unit's director, Gerald Keusch of the Fogarty International Center, résumés for other scientists that Keusch described as "lightweights" with "no scientific credibility." Keusch relayed to one of those rejected, Nobel laureate Torsten Wiesel, that he was pushed aside for having "signed too many full-page letters in The New York Times critical of President Bush." This incident was cited by the advocacy group Union of Concerned Scientists as part of a report detailing their allegations of a "politicization of science" under President George W. Bush's administration.

=== Resignation press conference ===
Thompson resigned on December 3, 2004, in a press conference at which he issued warnings over the dangers of avian flu and the poisoning of U.S. food supplies by terrorists. Thompson stated that he had attempted to resign in 2003, but remained until after the President's reelection at the administration's request. Some noted, in particular, his words: "I, for the life of me, cannot understand why the terrorists have not, you know, attacked our food supply because it is so easy to do. And we are importing a lot of food from the Middle East, and it would be easy to tamper with that."

== Post-government private sector work ==
After leaving the public sector at the end of the Bush Administration, Thompson joined the law firm Akin Gump, and the consulting firm Deloitte and joined the boards of directors of other companies.

Thompson also joined the board of about two dozen private companies and nonprofit groups.

In 2011, Thompson was paid more than $1.1 million in cash and stock incentives from five public companies, Thompson's consulting firm was paid $471,000 by six companies, and Thompson himself received $3 million from the sale of a healthcare firm he chaired. Thompson's work with these companies and other investments led him to accumulate a disclosed net worth of $13 million.

A number of those companies and organizations (as of 2012), "he helps oversee have faced an array of troubles, including claims of making faulty and dangerous medical implants, failing grades from a corporate watchdog and allegations of misleading investors." An expert with one agency that gave failing marks three of the six public companies who boards Thompson sits on commented that "either [Thompson] has really bad luck choosing companies...or he is one of the directors on company boards who is not exercising sufficient oversight."

Thompson became a partner at law firm Akin Gump, a Washington, D.C., law firm that engages in federal lobbying. There, Thompson provided "strategic advice" to the lobbyists in the firm's health care practice, advising them on how to most successfully lobby government officials on behalf of the firm's clients.

He also became a senior advisor at the professional services firm Deloitte and became Independent Chairman of its Deloitte Center for Health Solutions. Thompson was no longer associated with Deloitte by October 2011.

== Initial post-government political activities ==
Soon after leaving office, Thompson began publicly proposing policy solutions for a variety of programs that he had overseen as HHS Secretary. However, critics claimed many changes would benefit companies Thompson owned or had a financial stake in (including Centene and the Deloitte Center for Health Solutions). These included transferring some Medicaid beneficiaries from federal to state responsibility and requiring digitization of medical records, which would directly benefit those companies.

Thompson spoke as a panelist at a 2005 Harvard Kennedy School conference on global poverty, where he discussed medical diplomacy. Thompson also authored a Boston Globe op-ed on the topic.

One of the nonprofit organizations that Thompson joined the board of, Medical Missions for Children, recruited Thompson to co-host a number of episodes of one of its health instructional series, Plain Talk about Health.

== 2008 presidential campaign ==
After first announcing the formation of an exploratory committee in late 2006, Thompson announced his candidacy for the 2008 presidential election on April 1, 2007.

=== Statement about sexual orientation and workplace protections ===
During a May 3, 2007, presidential debate at the Ronald Reagan Presidential Library Thompson was asked by moderator Chris Matthews whether a private employer opposed to homosexuality should have the right to fire a gay worker. He said, "I think that is left up to the individual business. I really sincerely believe that that is an issue that business people have got to make their own determination as to whether or not they should be."

He later claimed that he did not hear the question correctly, saying, "It's not my position. There should be no discrimination in the workplace." He would also claim that he had been feeling sick on the day of the debate, and that he was distracted when that question was asked by his own impending need to use a bathroom.

==== Gaffe about Jews, Israel ====
I'm in the private sector and for the first time in my life I'm earning money. You know that's sort of part of the Jewish tradition and I do not find anything wrong with that. [...]
I just want to clarify something because I didn't in any means want to infer or imply anything about Jews and finances and things. What I was referring to, ladies and gentlemen, is the accomplishments of the Jewish religion. You've been outstanding business people and I compliment you for that.

— Tommy Thompson, address to the Religious Action Center of Reform Judaism – Consultation on Conscience, Washington, DC, April 16, 2007

Thompson was courting public support, not trying to alienate people—which means he somehow believed that repeating an age-old stereotype about Jews and money would please his Jewish listeners! There could be no more vivid illustration of how deeply ingrained these stereotypes have become.

— Abraham Foxman, National Director, Anti-Defamation League, Jews and Money: The Story of a Stereotype (Macmillan, 2010, p. 139)

In April 2007, Thompson was compelled to apologize for remarks he made about Jews and Israel during an address to an assembled crowd of Jewish social activists in Washington, D.C.

On April 16, 2007, appearing before a conference organized by the Religious Action Center of Reform Judaism, Thompson referenced his lucrative transition from public service to the private sector and invoked stereotypes linking Judaism with finance. Thompson stated: "You know that's sort of part of the Jewish tradition and I do not find anything wrong with that." Thompson then returned to the podium with the intention of clearing up his earlier comments, adding: "I just want to clarify something because I didn't (by) any means want to infer or imply anything about Jews and finances and things. What I was referring to, ladies and gentlemen, is the accomplishments of the Jewish religion. You've been outstanding business people and I compliment you for that." Thompson's comments caused "unease in the room" as the attendees tried to decode the meaning of Thompson's use of this stereotype.

Thompson made a variety of other lesser gaffes, including referring to the Anti Defamation League as the fringe Jewish Defense League, and to Israel bonds as "Jewish bonds". He discussed his connections to politically conservative Israeli and Jewish leaders while speaking to the mostly liberal leaning group

Conference organizers noted the unease with Thompson's words but otherwise limited their comments on the faux pas, instead thanking Thompson for being one of the speakers at the conference.

The national director of the Anti-Defamation League, Abraham Foxman, later wrote of the incident that "there could be no more vivid illustration of how deeply ingrained these stereotypes [about Jews and finances] have become" than Thompson's belief that "repeating an age-old stereotype about Jews and money would please his Jewish listeners!"

After the event, Thompson told Politico that his remarks could be blamed on fatigue and a persistent cold. Journalists believed that Thompson had instead failed to prepare for the event, acquaint himself beforehand with the likely audience, and recruit an adviser to properly brief him before the event.

=== Iowa straw poll; withdrawal and endorsements ===
Thompson had stated he would drop out of the race if he did not finish either first or second in the Ames straw poll on August 11, 2007. Thompson finished sixth, with just 7% of the vote, despite the fact that some major contenders were not competing in the poll. On August 12, Thompson officially announced he would drop out of the race. In October, Thompson endorsed Rudy Giuliani. Thompson told the Associated Press in a statement that "Rudy Giuliani has shown that he is a true leader. He can and will win the nomination and the presidency. He is America's mayor, and during a period of time of great stress for this country he showed tremendous leadership." He then endorsed Senator John McCain after Giuliani's withdrawal from the presidential race. In a New York Times article published October 11, 2008, Thompson was quoted in response to a question regarding whether he was happy with McCain's campaign as saying, "No. I don't know who is."

== 2012 U.S. Senate election ==
While Thompson gave some consideration to running for the governorship again in 2010, he more seriously considered running for the United States Senate in Wisconsin's 2010 election. Ultimately, however, he declined to run for either office in 2010. On September 19, 2011, Thompson announced he would run in 2012 for the seat vacated by Herb Kohl. He more formally launched his campaign with an announcement video on December 1.

=== Political positions during 2012 campaign ===
During the 2012 campaign, Thompson, speaking to a Tea Party group, said, "Who better than me, that's already finished one of the entitlement programs, to come up with programs that do away with Medicaid and Medicare?" When a videotape of his remarks surfaced, Thompson stated that he did not want to eliminate Medicare but instead wanted a system that would provide a subsidy to individuals to help them purchase private health insurance.

Thompson favored making the Bush tax cuts permanent and adopting a 15% flat tax.

=== Republican primary ===
After a bitter four-way race, Thompson won the Republican nomination on August 14, 2012. His opponents in the primary had included Eric Hovde (a millionaire hedge fund manager), Mark Neumann (a former congressman), and Jeff Fitzgerald (speaker of the Wisconsin State Assembly). During the primary, attention was raised to the fact that in 2008 Thompson had given campaign contributions to two Democrats – $250 to Michigan U.S. senator Carl Levin and $100 to Bev Perdue, who was running for governor of North Carolina. Both Democrats won in that year's elections. That same election cycle, he had given $1,200 to the Wisconsin Republican Party. The attacks against Thompson led to Mike Huckabee (a Republican who was the former governor of Arkansas, a former presidential candidate, and an active conservative media figure) offering a defense and endorsement of Thompson.

=== General election ===
Ahead of the general election, ALEC member the American Chemistry Council spent nearly $650,000 in support of Thompson's campaign in the latter part of 2012. Thompson faced Democratic Congresswoman Tammy Baldwin in the general election. Although most polls from the spring through September showed Thompson ahead, he ultimately lost to Baldwin in the general election, receiving 45.9% against Baldwin's 51.5%. Ultimately, Thompson could not overcome a combined 260,000-vote deficit in the state's two largest counties, Milwaukee and Dane – home to Milwaukee and Madison, respectively. It was the first time Thompson had lost a statewide election.

== Later political involvement ==
Over the course of the Republican primaries for the United States presidential election of 2016 Thompson endorsed a number of candidates. Before the primaries, he initially endorsed Scott Walker's campaign. After Walker withdrew his candidacy, Thompson gave his endorsement to the campaign of Jeb Bush. In March 2016 (a month after Bush ended his campaign), Thompson endorsed the campaign of John Kasich and became chair of Kasich's Wisconsin state campaign operation. In early July, Thompson, endorsed Donald Trump (the party's presumptive nominee) and served as a delegate to the 2016 Republican National Convention.

Thompson considered running for Wisconsin governor again in 2022, which would mean challenging incumbent Democrat Tony Evers. In March 2022, he visited Mar-a-Lago to consult with then-former president Trump about such a possibility. In April, Thompson claimed that he would not be running for governor. He claimed that he had received encouragement from Trump, but was ultimately dissuaded from running by objections from his own immediate family. In July, Thompson gave his own endorsement in the Republican gubernatorial primary to Tim Michels (the Trump-backed candidate). Trump and Thompson's endorsements of Michels was seen as helping him to overtake former lieutenant governor Rebecca Kleefisch in the polls. While Michels succeeded in securing the Republican nomination, he went on to lose to Evers.

In October 2022, Thompson joined the Council for Responsible Social Media project launched by Issue One to address the negative mental, civic, and public health impacts of social media in the United States co-chaired by former House Democratic Caucus Leader Dick Gephardt and former Massachusetts Lieutenant Governor Kerry Healey.

Thompson served as a delegate to the 2024 Republican National Convention (held in Milwaukee), and delivered a speech at the convention. Thompson claimed that it was the twelfth consecutive Republican convention to which he had been a delegate. In the 2024 presidential election, Thompson once again endorsed Trump, and sent Trump's campaign advice on campaigning in Wisconsin. Thompson also campaigned alongside Trump in Wisconsin.

== President of the University of Wisconsin System (2020–22) ==
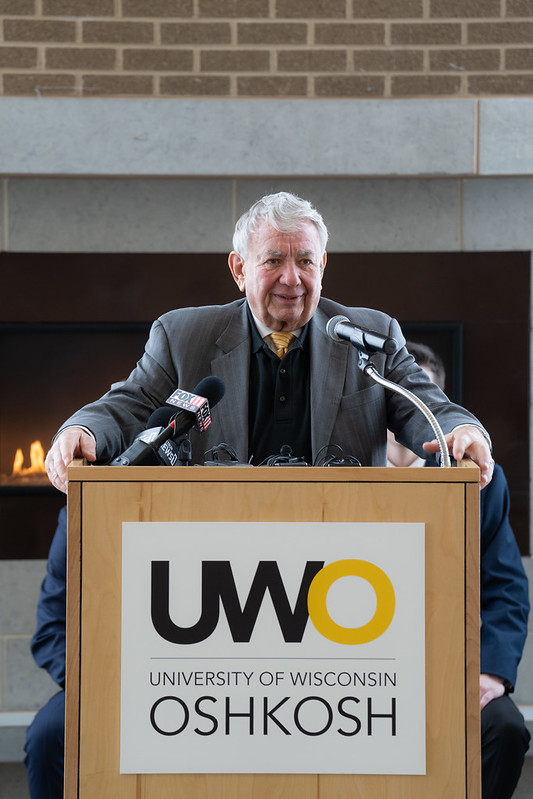
Thompson (as UW System president) visiting the campus of UW Oshkosh in March 2022.

In the fall of 2019, incumbent University of Wisconsin System President Ray Cross announced his intention to retire. This kicked off a search by the University of Wisconsin System Board of Regents to find his successor. In what was seen as a flawed candidate search, complicated by the COVID-19 pandemic in Wisconsin, the board initially was poised to offer the position to University of Alaska System President Jim Johnsen. Johnsen was ultimately forced to withdraw amidst vocal opposition from University of Wisconsin System faculty and students. A week later, after closed-door sessions, the board named Thompson as the interim president. Thompson served nearly two years as interim president before announcing in January 2022 that he would step down, effective March 18, 2022.

== Electoral history ==
=== Wisconsin Assembly, Adams-Juneau-Marquette district (1966–1970) ===
Wisconsin Assembly, Adams–Juneau–Marquette District Election, 1966
Party	Candidate	Votes	%	±%
Republican primary, September 13, 1966
Republican	Tommy Thompson	2,697	56.67%	
Republican	Louis C. Romell (incumbent)	2,062	43.33%	−8.16%
Plurality		635	13.34%	+10.36%
Total votes		4,759	100.0%	+11.69%
General Election, November 8, 1966
Republican	Tommy Thompson	7,703	71.96%	+18.42%
Democratic	Stephen E. Baumgartner	3,002	28.04%	
Plurality		4,701	43.91%	+36.84%
Total votes		10,705	100.0%	-24.54%
Republican hold				

Wisconsin Assembly, Adams–Juneau–Marquette District Election, 1968
Party	Candidate	Votes	%	±%
General Election, November 5, 1968
Republican	Tommy Thompson (incumbent)	9,818	69.62%	−2.34%
Democratic	Leslie J. Schmidt	4,285	30.38%	
Plurality		5,533	39.23%	-4.68%
Total votes		14,103	100.0%	+31.74%
Republican hold				

Wisconsin Assembly, Adams–Juneau–Marquette District Election, 1970
Party	Candidate	Votes	%	±%
General Election, November 5, 1968
Republican	Tommy Thompson (incumbent)	7,294	65.69%	−3.93%
Democratic	Justin E. Tarvid	3,810	34.31%	
Plurality		3,484	31.38%	-7.86%
Total votes		11,104	100.0%	-21.26%
Republican hold				

=== Wisconsin Assembly, 79th district (1972–1980) ===
Wisconsin Assembly, 79th District Election, 1972
Party	Candidate	Votes	%	±%
General Election, November 7, 1972
Republican	Tommy Thompson	12,027	61.53%	
Democratic	Robert M. Thompson	7,519	38.47%	
Plurality		4,508	23.06%	
Total votes		19,546	100.0%	
Republican win (new seat)				

Wisconsin Assembly, 79th District Election, 1974
Party	Candidate	Votes	%	±%
General Election, November 5, 1974
Republican	Tommy Thompson (incumbent)	10,116	67.93%	+6.40%
Democratic	Daniel P. O'Connor	4,775	32.07%	
Plurality		5,341	35.87%	+12.80%
Total votes		14,891	100.0%	-23.82%
Republican hold				

Wisconsin Assembly, 79th District Election, 1976
Party	Candidate	Votes	%	±%
General Election, November 2, 1976
Republican	Tommy Thompson (incumbent)	14,549	67.96%	+0.03%
Democratic	Samuel O. Gratz	6,858	32.04%	
Plurality		7,691	35.93%	+0.06%
Total votes		21,407	100.0%	+43.76%
Republican hold				

Wisconsin Assembly, 79th District Election, 1978
Party	Candidate	Votes	%	±%
General Election, November 7, 1978
Republican	Tommy Thompson (incumbent)	12,136	76.49%	+8.52%
Democratic	George L. Lytle	3,731	23.51%	
Plurality		8,405	52.97%	+17.04%
Total votes		15,867	100.0%	-25.88%
Republican hold				

=== United States House of Representatives (1979) ===
Wisconsin's 6th Congressional District Special Election, 1979
Party	Candidate	Votes	%	±%
Special Republican primary, February 20, 1979
Republican	Thomas Petri	22,293	35.25%	
Republican	Tommy Thompson	11,850	18.74%	
Republican	Jack D. Steinhilber	11,810	18.68%	
Republican	Kenneth Benson	10,965	17.34%	
Republican	Donald Jones	5,077	8.03%	
Republican	Richard Wright	844	1.33%	
Republican	John Gregory	395	0.62%	
Plurality		10,443	30.59%	
Total votes		63,234	100.0%	

=== Wisconsin Governor (1986–1998) ===
Wisconsin Gubernatorial Election, 1986
Party	Candidate	Votes	%	±%
Republican primary, September 9, 1986
Republican	Tommy Thompson	156,875	52.11%	
Republican	Jonathan B. Barry	67,114	22.30%	
Republican	George Watts	58,424	19.41%	
Republican	Albert Lee Wiley, Jr.	15,233	5.06%	
Republican	Joseph A. Ortiz	3,374	1.12%	
Plurality		89,761	29.82%	
Total votes		301,020	100.0%	
General Election, November 4, 1986
Republican	Tommy Thompson Scott McCallum	805,090	52.74%	+10.80%
Democratic	Tony Earl (incumbent) Sharon K. Metz	705,578	46.22%	−10.53%
Labor–Farm	Kathryn A. Christensen John Ervin Bergum	10,323	0.68%	
Independent	Darold E. Wall Irma L. Lotts	3,913	0.26%	
Independent	Sanford Knapp Verdell Hallingstad	1,668	0.11%	
	Scattering	1	0.00%	
Plurality		99,512	6.52%	-8.30%
Total votes		1,526,573	100.0%	-3.40%
Republican gain from Democratic		Swing	21.33%	

Wisconsin Gubernatorial Election, 1990
Party	Candidate	Votes	%	±%
Republican primary, September 11, 1990
Republican	Tommy Thompson	201,467	92.68%	
Republican	Bennett A. Masel	11,230	5.17%	
Republican	Edmond C. Hou-Seye	4,665	2.15%	
Republican	Willie G. Lovelace	8	0.00%	
Plurality		190,237	87.52%	
Total votes		217,370	100.0%	-27.79%
General Election, November 6, 1990
Republican	Tommy Thompson (incumbent) Scott McCallum	802,321	58.15%	+5.41%
Democratic	Thomas A. Loftus Joseph Czarnezki	576,280	41.77%	−4.45%
	Scattering	1,126	0.08%	
Plurality		226,041	16.38%	+9.86%
Total votes		1,379,727	100.0%	-9.62%
Republican hold				

Wisconsin Gubernatorial Election, 1994
Party	Candidate	Votes	%	±%
General Election, November 8, 1994
Republican	Tommy Thompson (incumbent) Scott McCallum	1,051,326	67.23%	+9.08%
Democratic	Charles Chvala Dorothy K. Dean	482,850	30.88%	−10.89%
Libertarian	David S. Harmon Kevin J. Robinson	11,639	0.74%	
U.S. Taxpayers'	Edward J. Frami Michael J. O'Hare	9,188	0.59%	
Independent	Michael J. Mangan	8,150	0.52%	
	Scattering	682	0.04%	
Plurality		568,476	36.35%	+19.97%
Total votes		1,563,835	100.0%	+13.34%
Republican hold				

Wisconsin Gubernatorial Election, 1998
Party	Candidate	Votes	%	±%
Republican primary, September 8, 1998
Republican	Tommy Thompson (incumbent)	229,916	83.55%	
Republican	Jeffrey A. Hyslop	45,252	16.45%	
Plurality		184,664	67.11%	
Total votes		275,168	100.0%	
General Election, November 3, 1998
Republican	Tommy Thompson (incumbent) Scott McCallum	1,047,716	59.66%	−7.56%
Democratic	Ed Garvey Barbara Lawton	679,553	38.70%	+7.82%
Libertarian	Jeffrey L. Mueller James Dean	11,071	0.63%	−0.11%
U.S. Taxpayers'	Edward J. Frami Thomas R. Rivers	10,269	0.58%	−0.00%
Independent	Michael J. Mangan	4,985	0.28%	−0.24%
Independent	A-Ja-mu Muhammad Vida Harley Bridges	1,604	0.09%	
Green	Jeffrey L. Smith (write-in) R. Smith	14	0.00%	
	Scattering	802	0.05%	
Plurality		368,163	20.97%	-15.39%
Total votes		1,756,014	100.0%	+12.29%
Republican hold				

=== United States Senate (2012) ===
United States Senate Election in Wisconsin, 2012
Party	Candidate	Votes	%	±%
Republican primary, August 14, 2012
Republican	Tommy Thompson	197,928	33.99%	
Republican	Eric Hovde	179,557	30.83%	
Republican	Mark Neumann	132,786	22.80%	
Republican	Jeff Fitzgerald	71,871	12.34%	
	Scattering	244	0.04%	
Plurality		18,371	3.15%	
Total votes		582,386	100.0%	-5.89%
General Election, November 6, 2012
Democratic	Tammy Baldwin	1,547,104	51.41%	−15.90%
Republican	Tommy Thompson	1,380,126	45.86%	+16.38%
Independent	Joseph Kexel	62,240	2.07%	N/A
Independent	Nimrod Allen III	16,455	0.55%	N/A
Write-in		3,486	0.11%	+0.05%
Total votes		3,009,411	100.00%	N/A

Wisconsin State Assembly
Preceded by John C. Shabaz	Minority Leader of the Wisconsin State Assembly; 1981–1987	Succeeded by Betty Jo Nelsen
Party political offices
Preceded by Terry Kohler	Republican nominee for Governor of Wisconsin; 1986, 1990, 1994, 1998	Succeeded by Scott McCallum
Preceded by Carroll Campbell	Chair of the Republican Governors Association; 1991–1992	Succeeded by George Voinovich
Preceded by Robert Lorge	Republican nominee for U.S. Senator from Wisconsin (Class 1); 2012	Succeeded by Leah Vukmir
Political offices
Preceded by Tony Earl	Governor of Wisconsin; 1987–2001	Succeeded by Scott McCallum
Preceded by Howard Dean	Chair of the National Governors Association; 1995–1996	Succeeded by Bob Miller
Preceded by Donna Shalala	United States Secretary of Health and Human Services; 2001–2005	Succeeded by Mike Leavitt
Academic offices
Preceded by Ray Cross	President of the University of Wisconsin System; Acting; 2020–2022	Succeeded by Mike Falbo; Acting
U.S. order of precedence (ceremonial)
Preceded by John Ashcroft as Former U.S. Cabinet Member	Order of precedence of the United States as Former U.S. Cabinet Member	Succeeded by Tom Ridge as Former U.S. Cabinet Member
