= 1986 Wisconsin gubernatorial election =

- November 4, 1986
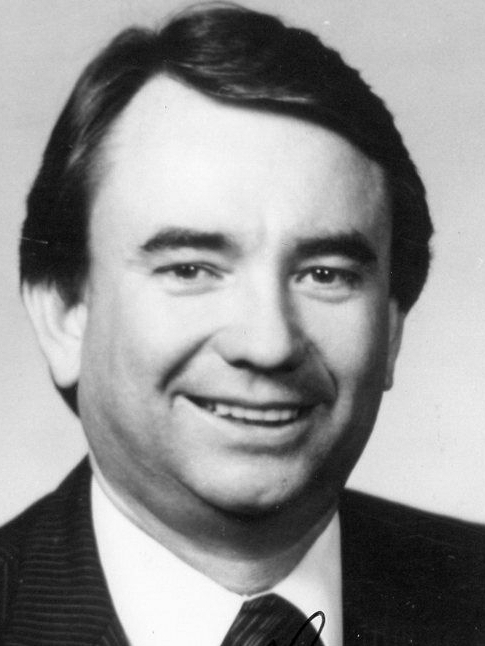

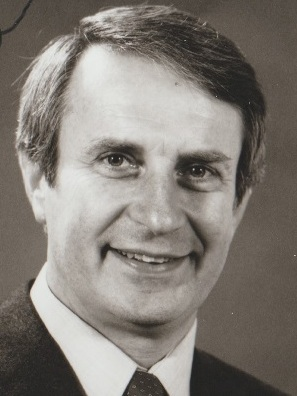
Nominee	Tommy G. Thompson	Anthony S. Earl
Party	Republican	Democratic
Running mate	Scott McCallum	Sharon K. Metz
Popular vote	805,090	705,578
Percentage	52.73%	46.21%
- County results Thompson: 40–50% 50–60% 60–70% 70–80% Earl: 40–50% 50–60% 60–70% 70–80%
Governor before election
Anthony S. Earl
Democratic
Elected Governor
Tommy G. Thompson
Republican

The 1986 Wisconsin gubernatorial election was held on November 4, 1986. Republican Tommy G. Thompson won the election with 53% of the vote, winning his first term as Governor of Wisconsin and defeating incumbent Governor Anthony S. Earl. This was the first time since 1962 that the winner of a Wisconsin gubernatorial election was of the same party as the incumbent president. Jonathan B. Barry unsuccessfully sought the Republican nomination.

== Primary election ==
The primary election was held on September 9, 1986. Nominees for Governor and Lieutenant Governor were selected in separate primaries before running on a joint ticket in the general election.

=== Democratic party ===
==== Governor ====
===== Candidates =====
- Anthony S. Earl, incumbent governor
- Edmond Hou-Seye, perennial candidate

===== Results =====
Democratic gubernatorial primary results
Party	Candidate	Votes	%
Democratic	Anthony S. Earl (incumbent)	215,183	80.30%
Democratic	Edmond Hou-Seye	52,784	19.70%
Total votes		267,967	100.00%

==== Lieutenant Governor ====
===== Candidates =====
- Taylor Benson, former member of Wisconsin Senate
- Gervase Hephner, member of Wisconsin State Assembly
- Cletus J. Johnson, nominee for Secretary of State of Wisconsin in 1966
- Sharon K. Metz, member of Wisconsin State Assembly
- Arlyn F. Wollenburg, perennial candidate

===== Results =====
Democratic lieutenant gubernatorial primary results
Party	Candidate	Votes	%
Democratic	Sharon K. Metz	101,753	42.01%
Democratic	Gervase Hephner	52,313	21.60%
Democratic	Cletus J. Johnson	50,795	20.97%
Democratic	Taylor Benson	29,353	12.12%
Democratic	Arlyn F. Wollenburg	7,984	3.30%
Total votes		242,198	100.00%

=== Republican party ===
==== Governor ====
===== Candidates =====
- Jonathan B. Barry, Dane County Executive
- Joseph A. Ortiz
- Tommy G. Thompson, member of Wisconsin State Assembly
- George Watts, Milwaukee businessman
- Albert Lee Wiley Jr.

===== Results =====
Republican gubernatorial primary results
Party	Candidate	Votes	%
Republican	Tommy G. Thompson	156,875	52.11%
Republican	Jonathan B. Barry	67,114	22.30%
Republican	George Watts	58,424	19.41%
Republican	Albert Lee Wiley Jr.	15,233	5.06%
Republican	Joseph A. Ortiz	3,374	1.12%
Total votes		301,020	100.00%

==== Lieutenant Governor ====
===== Candidates =====
- Patricia A. Goodrich, former member of Wisconsin State Assembly
- Drew W. Heiden
- Scott McCallum, member of Wisconsin Senate
- Robert Nolan

===== Results =====
Republican lieutenant gubernatorial primary results
Party	Candidate	Votes	%
Republican	Scott McCallum	134,099	49.48%
Republican	Patricia A. Goodrich	65,628	24.22%
Republican	Robert Nolan	51,836	19.13%
Republican	Drew W. Heiden	19,451	7.18%
Total votes		271,014	100.00%

=== Labor-Farm party ===
==== Governor ====
===== Candidates =====
- Kathryn A. Christensen

===== Results =====
Labor-Farm gubernatorial primary results
Party	Candidate	Votes	%
Labor-Farm	Kathryn A. Christensen	1,088	100.00%
Total votes		1,088	100.00%

==== Lieutenant Governor ====
===== Candidates =====
- John Ervin Bergum

===== Results =====
Labor-Farm lieutenant gubernatorial primary results
Party	Candidate	Votes	%
Labor-Farm	John Ervin Bergum	1,012	100.00%
Total votes		1,012	100.00%

=== Independent nominations ===
==== Governor ====
===== Candidates =====
- Sanford Knapp
- Darold E. Wall

===== Results =====
Independent gubernatorial primary results
Party	Candidate	Votes	%
Independent	Darold E. Wall	525	59.59%
Independent	Sanford Knapp	356	40.41%
Total votes		881	100.00%

== General election ==
=== Candidates ===
- Anthony S. Earl & Sharon K. Metz, Democrat
- Tommy G. Thompson & Scott McCallum, Republican
- Kathryn A. Christensen & John Ervin Bergum, Labor-Farm
- Darold E. Wall & Irma L. Lotts, Independent
- Sanford Knapp & Verdell Hallingstad, Independent

=== Results ===
1986 Wisconsin gubernatorial election
Party	Candidate	Votes	%	±%
Republican	Tommy G. Thompson	805,090	52.73%	+10.79%
Democratic	Anthony S. Earl	705,578	46.21%	−10.55%
Labor-Farm	Kathryn A. Christensen	10,323	0.68%	
Independent	Darold E. Wall	3,913	0.26%	
Independent	Sanford Knapp	1,668	0.11%	
	Scattering	388	0.03%	
Majority		99,512	6.52%	
Total votes		1,526,960	100.00%	
Republican gain from Democratic		Swing	+21.33%	

=== Results by county ===
Thompson was the first Republican since Walter J. Kohler Jr. in 1952 to win Ashland County and Manitowoc County.

County	Tommy G. Thompson Republican		Anthony S. Earl Democratic		All Others Various		Margin		Total votes cast
County	#	%	#	%	#	%	#	%	Total votes cast
Adams	3,193	63.54%	1,800	35.82%	32	0.64%	1,393	27.72%	5,025
Ashland	3,076	49.67%	3,015	48.68%	102	1.65%	61	0.98%	6,193
Barron	5,720	51.27%	5,366	48.10%	70	0.63%	354	3.17%	11,156
Bayfield	2,664	48.15%	2,788	50.39%	81	1.46%	-124	-2.24%	5,533
Brown	34,762	55.73%	27,000	43.29%	612	0.98%	7,762	12.44%	62,374
Buffalo	2,471	51.27%	2,321	48.15%	28	0.58%	150	3.11%	4,820
Burnett	2,378	44.49%	2,887	54.01%	80	1.50%	-509	-9.52%	5,345
Calumet	6,492	62.79%	3,716	35.94%	131	1.27%	2,776	26.85%	10,339
Chippewa	7,041	47.93%	7,173	48.83%	477	3.25%	-132	-0.90%	14,691
Clark	6,080	57.90%	4,287	40.83%	133	1.27%	1,793	17.08%	10,500
Columbia	9,035	59.74%	6,002	39.69%	86	0.57%	3,033	20.06%	15,123
Crawford	3,563	64.23%	1,926	34.72%	58	1.05%	1,637	29.51%	5,547
Dane	51,412	39.68%	76,204	58.82%	1,947	1.50%	-24,792	-19.14%	129,563
Dodge	15,045	66.73%	7,300	32.38%	200	0.89%	7,745	34.35%	22,545
Door	5,211	63.67%	2,903	35.47%	70	0.86%	2,308	28.20%	8,184
Douglas	4,582	33.33%	9,063	65.93%	101	0.73%	-4,481	-32.60%	13,746
Dunn	4,520	44.77%	5,459	54.07%	117	1.16%	-939	-9.30%	10,096
Eau Claire	12,813	47.42%	13,862	51.30%	344	1.27%	-1,049	-3.88%	27,019
Florence	895	52.10%	815	47.44%	8	0.47%	80	4.66%	1,718
Fond du Lac	17,248	64.83%	9,136	34.34%	219	0.82%	8,112	30.49%	26,603
Forest	1,367	49.65%	1,364	49.55%	22	0.80%	3	0.11%	2,753
Grant	7,847	62.83%	4,548	36.42%	94	0.75%	3,299	26.42%	12,489
Green	4,721	59.99%	3,054	38.81%	94	1.19%	1,667	21.18%	7,869
Green Lake	4,407	73.63%	1,522	25.43%	56	0.94%	2,885	48.20%	5,985
Iowa	3,385	54.31%	2,790	44.76%	58	0.93%	595	9.55%	6,233
Iron	1,205	46.24%	1,381	52.99%	20	0.77%	-176	-6.75%	2,606
Jackson	3,256	54.35%	2,698	45.03%	37	0.62%	558	9.31%	5,991
Jefferson	11,551	58.98%	7,876	40.21%	159	0.81%	3,675	18.76%	19,586
Juneau	5,904	73.04%	2,122	26.25%	57	0.71%	3,782	46.79%	8,083
Kenosha	12,385	38.77%	19,293	60.40%	263	0.82%	-6,908	-21.63%	31,941
Kewaunee	4,052	56.77%	3,029	42.44%	56	0.78%	1,023	14.33%	7,137
La Crosse	17,596	52.92%	15,290	45.98%	365	1.10%	2,306	6.94%	33,251
Lafayette	3,124	59.29%	2,113	40.10%	32	0.61%	1,011	19.19%	5,269
Langlade	3,907	59.43%	2,610	39.70%	57	0.87%	1,297	19.73%	6,574
Lincoln	4,060	53.32%	3,456	45.38%	99	1.30%	604	7.93%	7,615
Manitowoc	15,203	56.75%	11,176	41.72%	411	1.53%	4,027	15.03%	26,790
Marathon	20,827	55.33%	16,318	43.35%	498	1.32%	4,509	11.98%	37,643
Marinette	7,856	60.68%	4,974	38.42%	116	0.90%	2,882	22.26%	12,946
Marquette	3,012	68.45%	1,350	30.68%	38	0.86%	1,662	37.77%	4,400
Menominee	216	23.89%	684	75.66%	4	0.44%	-468	-51.77%	904
Milwaukee	129,933	44.17%	161,149	54.79%	3,066	1.04%	-31,216	-10.61%	294,148
Monroe	6,015	63.65%	3,360	35.56%	75	0.79%	2,655	28.10%	9,450
Oconto	6,058	60.28%	3,897	38.78%	94	0.94%	2,161	21.50%	10,049
Oneida	6,390	57.92%	4,571	41.43%	72	0.65%	1,819	16.49%	11,033
Outagamie	25,445	61.18%	15,701	37.75%	443	1.07%	9,744	23.43%	41,589
Ozaukee	16,973	65.31%	8,807	33.89%	210	0.81%	8,166	31.42%	25,990
Pepin	1,297	51.24%	1,202	47.49%	32	1.26%	95	3.75%	2,531
Pierce	3,614	42.59%	4,781	56.35%	90	1.06%	-1,167	-13.75%	8,485
Polk	4,281	44.69%	5,204	54.33%	94	0.98%	-923	-9.64%	9,579
Portage	7,938	45.27%	9,363	53.40%	233	1.33%	-1,425	-8.13%	17,534
Price	3,969	61.39%	2,437	37.70%	59	0.91%	1,532	23.70%	6,465
Racine	26,575	51.14%	24,892	47.90%	503	0.97%	1,683	3.24%	51,970
Richland	4,051	64.46%	2,165	34.45%	69	1.10%	1,886	30.01%	6,285
Rock	19,459	50.04%	19,005	48.88%	420	1.08%	454	1.17%	38,884
Rusk	2,999	53.00%	2,592	45.81%	67	1.18%	407	7.19%	5,658
Sauk	8,994	61.91%	5,440	37.45%	93	0.64%	3,554	24.46%	14,527
Sawyer	2,895	60.41%	1,839	38.38%	58	1.21%	1,056	22.04%	4,792
Shawano	7,181	66.10%	3,608	33.21%	75	0.69%	3,573	32.89%	10,864
Sheboygan	17,324	49.91%	17,091	49.24%	294	0.85%	233	0.67%	34,709
St. Croix	5,990	46.80%	6,744	52.70%	64	0.50%	-754	-5.89%	12,798
Taylor	4,069	62.52%	2,345	36.03%	94	1.44%	1,724	26.49%	6,508
Trempealeau	4,171	49.26%	4,243	50.11%	53	0.63%	-72	-0.85%	8,467
Vernon	4,911	62.10%	2,9433	37.22%	54	0.68%	1,968	24.89%	7,908
Vilas	4,854	68.32%	2,207	31.06%	44	0.62%	2,647	37.26%	7,105
Walworth	11,786	60.41%	7,505	38.47%	220	1.13%	4,281	21.94%	19,511
Washburn	2,613	53.02%	2,267	46.00%	48	0.97%	346	7.02%	4,928
Washington	16,757	62.57%	9,755	36.43%	269	1.00%	7,002	26.15%	26,781
Waukesha	62,387	62.54%	36,389	36.48%	973	0.98%	25,998	26.06%	99,749
Waupaca	7,835	64.92%	4,121	34.15%	113	0.94%	3,714	30.77%	12,069
Waushara	4,057	67.17%	1,909	31.61%	74	1.23%	2,148	35.56%	6,040
Winnebago	25,786	59.04%	17,316	39.65%	571	1.31%	8,470	19.39%	43,673
Wood	14,401	58.31%	10,059	40.73%	236	0.96%	4,342	17.58%	24,696
Total	805,090	52.73%	705,578	46.21%	16,292	1.07%	99,512	6.52%	1,526,960

==== Counties that flipped from Democratic to Republican ====
- Adams
- Ashland
- Barron
- Brown
- Buffalo
- Fond du Lac
- Forest
- Jackson
- Jefferson
- Kewaunee
- La Crosse
- Langlade
- Manitowoc
- Marathon
- Oneida
- Outagamie
- Pepin
- Racine
- Rock
- Rusk
- Sheboygan
- Washburn
- Winnebago
- Wood
