= 1990 Wisconsin gubernatorial election =

- November 6, 1990
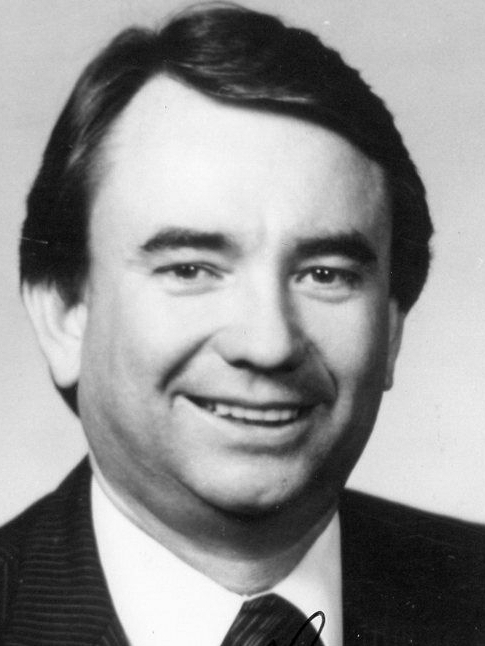

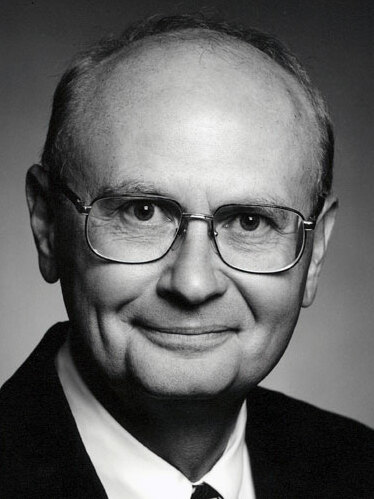
| Nominee | Tommy Thompson | Thomas A. Loftus |
| Party | Republican | Democratic |
| Running mate | Scott McCallum | Joseph Czarnezki |
| Popular vote | 802,321 | 576,280 |
| Percentage | 58.15% | 41.77% |
- Thompson: 40–50% 50–60% 60–70% 70–80% 80–90% >90% Loftus: 40–50% 50–60% 60–70% 70–80% 80–90% >90% Tie
Governor before election
Tommy G. Thompson
Republican
Elected Governor
Tommy G. Thompson
Republican

The 1990 Wisconsin gubernatorial election was held on November 6, 1990. Incumbent Republican governor Tommy Thompson won the election with 58% of the vote, winning a second term as Governor of Wisconsin. The primary elections were held on September 11, 1990.

As of 2022, this is the most recent Wisconsin gubernatorial election in which a Republican candidate won at the same time the party held the presidency. Neither party would pull off such a feat again until 2022, when Democratic governor Tony Evers won re-election during the presidency of fellow Democrat Joe Biden.

== Republican primary ==
=== Governor ===
==== Nominee ====
- Tommy G. Thompson, incumbent governor

===== Eliminated in primary =====
- Michele Ann Gess (write-in)
- Edmond Hou-Seye, perennial candidate
- Willie G. Lovelace (write-in)
- Bennett A. Masel

===== Results =====
Republican gubernatorial primary results
| Party | Candidate | Votes | % |
|---|---|---|---|
| Republican | Tommy G. Thompson (incumbent) | 201,467 | 92.68% |
| Republican | Bennett A. Masel | 11,230 | 5.17% |
| Republican | Edmond Hou-Seye | 4,665 | 2.15% |
| Republican | Willie G. Lovelace (write-in) | 8 | 0.00% |
| Total votes | | 217,370 | 100.00% |

=== Lieutenant Governor ===
==== Nominee ====
- Scott McCallum, incumbent lieutenant governor

==== Results ====
Republican lieutenant gubernatorial primary results
| Party | Candidate | Votes | % |
|---|---|---|---|
| Republican | Scott McCallum (incumbent) | 169,403 | 100.00% |
| Total votes | | 169,403 | 100.00% |

== Democratic party ==
=== Governor ===
==== Nominee ====
- Thomas A. Loftus, incumbent Speaker of the Wisconsin State Assembly

==== Results ====
Democratic gubernatorial primary results
| Party | Candidate | Votes | % |
|---|---|---|---|
| Democratic | Thomas A. Loftus | 153,346 | 100.00% |
| Total votes | | 153,346 | 100.00% |

=== Lieutenant Governor ===
==== Nominee ====
- Joseph Czarnezki, member of Wisconsin Senate

==== Results ====
Democratic lieutenant gubernatorial primary results
| Party | Candidate | Votes | % |
|---|---|---|---|
| Democratic | Joseph Czarnezki | 128,885 | 100.00% |
| Total votes | | 128,885 | 100.00% |

== Labor-Farm party ==
=== Governor ===
==== Nominee ====
- Rickey D. Keilholtz

==== Results ====
Labor-Farm gubernatorial primary results
| Party | Candidate | Votes | % |
|---|---|---|---|
| Labor-Farm | Rickey D. Keilholtz (write-in) | 223 | 100.00% |
| Total votes | | 223 | 100.00% |

=== Lieutenant Governor ===
==== Nominee ====
- Richard L. Ackley

==== Results ====
Labor-Farm lieutenant gubernatorial primary results
| Party | Candidate | Votes | % |
|---|---|---|---|
| Labor-Farm | Richard L. Ackley (write-in) | 208 | 100.00% |
| Total votes | | 208 | 100.00% |

== General election ==
=== Results ===
1990 Wisconsin gubernatorial election
| Party | Candidate | Votes | % | ±% |
|---|---|---|---|---|
| Republican | Tommy G. Thompson | 802,321 | 58.15% | +5.43% |
| Democratic | Thomas A. Loftus | 576,280 | 41.77% | −4.44% |
| | Scattering | 1,126 | 0.08% | |
| Majority | | 226,041 | 16.38% | |
| Total votes | | 1,379,727 | 100.00% | |
| Republican hold | | Swing | +9.87% | |

=== Results by county ===
Thompson was the first Republican since Philip La Follette in 1930 to win Iron County, the first since Walter S. Goodland in 1946 to win Milwaukee County, and the first since Walter J. Kohler Jr. in 1952 to win Douglas County and Kenosha County.

| County | Tommy G. Thompson Republican | | Thomas A. Loftus Democratic | | Scattering Write-in | | Margin | | Total votes cast |
| County | # | % | # | % | # | % | # | % | Total votes cast |
|---|---|---|---|---|---|---|---|---|---|
| Adams | 2,391 | 52.60% | 2,154 | 47.38% | 1 | 0.02% | 237 | 5.21% | 4,546 |
| Ashland | 3,066 | 59.49% | 2,087 | 40.49% | 1 | 0.02% | 979 | 18.99% | 5,154 |
| Barron | 5,494 | 52.37% | 4,982 | 47.49% | 14 | 0.13% | 512 | 4.88% | 10,490 |
| Bayfield | 3,309 | 59.24% | 2,276 | 40.74% | 1 | 0.02% | 1,033 | 18.49% | 5,586 |
| Brown | 35,561 | 57.62% | 26,143 | 42.36% | 14 | 0.02% | 9,418 | 15.26% | 61,718 |
| Buffalo | 2,262 | 52.06% | 2,083 | 47.94% | 0 | 0.00% | 179 | 4.12% | 4,345 |
| Burnett | 2,175 | 48.44% | 2,307 | 51.38% | 8 | 0.18% | -132 | -2.94% | 4,490 |
| Calumet | 6,109 | 65.96% | 3,151 | 34.02% | 2 | 0.02% | 2,958 | 31.94% | 9,262 |
| Chippewa | 7,954 | 54.86% | 6,542 | 45.12% | 3 | 0.02% | 1,412 | 9.74% | 14,499 |
| Clark | 5,761 | 58.22% | 4,131 | 41.75% | 3 | 0.03% | 1,630 | 16.47% | 9,895 |
| Columbia | 8,304 | 57.92% | 6,021 | 42.00% | 12 | 0.08% | 2,283 | 15.92% | 14,337 |
| Crawford | 2,456 | 55.37% | 1,976 | 44.54% | 4 | 0.09% | 480 | 10.82% | 4,436 |
| Dane | 55,998 | 45.63% | 66,638 | 54.29% | 98 | 0.08% | -10,640 | -8.67% | 122,734 |
| Dodge | 12,325 | 64.27% | 6,842 | 35.68% | 9 | 0.05% | 5,483 | 28.59% | 19,176 |
| Door | 5,291 | 62.06% | 3,235 | 37.94% | 0 | 0.00% | 2,056 | 24.11% | 8,526 |
| Douglas | 7,898 | 56.25% | 6,140 | 43.73% | 4 | 0.03% | 1,758 | 12.52% | 14,042 |
| Dunn | 4,613 | 48.42% | 4,900 | 51.43% | 14 | 0.15% | -287 | -3.01% | 9,527 |
| Eau Claire | 14,864 | 53.89% | 12,711 | 46.09% | 5 | 0.02% | 2,153 | 7.81% | 27,580 |
| Florence | 808 | 58.00% | 585 | 42.00% | 0 | 0.00% | 223 | 16.01% | 1,393 |
| Fond du Lac | 16,043 | 66.73% | 7,992 | 33.24% | 7 | 0.03% | 8,051 | 33.49% | 24,042 |
| Forest | 1,711 | 55.64% | 1,364 | 44.36% | 0 | 0.00% | 347 | 11.28% | 3,075 |
| Grant | 6,782 | 62.11% | 4,131 | 37.83% | 7 | 0.06% | 2,651 | 24.28% | 10,920 |
| Green | 4,454 | 58.31% | 3,180 | 41.63% | 4 | 0.05% | 1,274 | 16.68% | 7,638 |
| Green Lake | 3,412 | 69.10% | 1,526 | 30.90% | 0 | 0.00% | 1,886 | 38.19% | 4,938 |
| Iowa | 3,425 | 56.84% | 2,593 | 43.03% | 8 | 0.13% | 832 | 13.81% | 6,026 |
| Iron | 1,794 | 69.83% | 774 | 30.13% | 1 | 0.04% | 1,020 | 39.70% | 2,569 |
| Jackson | 3,196 | 52.27% | 2,918 | 47.73% | 0 | 0.00% | 278 | 4.55% | 6,114 |
| Jefferson | 10,646 | 62.79% | 6,305 | 37.18% | 5 | 0.03% | 4,341 | 25.60% | 16,956 |
| Juneau | 5,244 | 70.83% | 2,158 | 29.15% | 2 | 0.03% | 3,086 | 41.68% | 7,404 |
| Kenosha | 14,750 | 53.19% | 12,977 | 46.79% | 6 | 0.02% | 1,773 | 6.39% | 27,733 |
| Kewaunee | 4,140 | 57.29% | 3,087 | 42.71% | 0 | 0.00% | 1,053 | 14.57% | 7,227 |
| La Crosse | 16,790 | 54.24% | 14,164 | 45.76% | 2 | 0.01% | 2,626 | 8.48% | 30,956 |
| Lafayette | 3,203 | 61.22% | 2,028 | 38.76% | 1 | 0.02% | 1,175 | 22.46% | 5,232 |
| Langlade | 3,637 | 60.80% | 2,341 | 39.13% | 4 | 0.07% | 1,296 | 21.66% | 5,982 |
| Lincoln | 4,443 | 55.69% | 3,534 | 44.30% | 1 | 0.01% | 909 | 11.39% | 7,978 |
| Manitowoc | 12,967 | 56.15% | 10,098 | 43.73% | 28 | 0.12% | 2,869 | 12.42% | 23,093 |
| Marathon | 21,908 | 59.86% | 14,693 | 40.14% | 0 | 0.00% | 7,215 | 19.71% | 36,601 |
| Marinette | 7,524 | 58.73% | 5,286 | 41.26% | 2 | 0.02% | 2,238 | 17.47% | 12,812 |
| Marquette | 2,245 | 59.47% | 1,526 | 40.42% | 4 | 0.11% | 719 | 19.05% | 3,775 |
| Menominee | 390 | 41.76% | 544 | 58.24% | 0 | 0.00% | -154 | -16.49% | 934 |
| Milwaukee | 128,835 | 54.06% | 108,812 | 45.66% | 670 | 0.28% | 20,023 | 8.40% | 238,317 |
| Monroe | 5,189 | 59.38% | 3,546 | 40.58% | 3 | 0.03% | 1,643 | 18.80% | 8,738 |
| Oconto | 5,441 | 58.68% | 3,831 | 41.32% | 0 | 0.00% | 1,610 | 17.36% | 9,272 |
| Oneida | 7,208 | 62.47% | 4,328 | 37.51% | 2 | 0.02% | 2,880 | 24.96% | 11,538 |
| Outagamie | 27,500 | 64.68% | 15,010 | 35.31% | 5 | 0.01% | 12,490 | 29.38% | 42,515 |
| Ozaukee | 16,078 | 75.58% | 5,193 | 24.41% | 1 | 0.00% | 10,885 | 51.17% | 21,272 |
| Pepin | 1,047 | 50.97% | 1,006 | 48.98% | 1 | 0.05% | 41 | 2.00% | 2,054 |
| Pierce | 4,809 | 55.79% | 3,806 | 44.15% | 5 | 0.06% | 1,003 | 11.64% | 8,620 |
| Polk | 5,779 | 55.08% | 4,711 | 44.90% | 2 | 0.02% | 1,068 | 10.18% | 10,492 |
| Portage | 7,976 | 51.47% | 7,514 | 48.49% | 5 | 0.03% | 462 | 2.98% | 15,495 |
| Price | 3,592 | 54.88% | 2,949 | 45.06% | 4 | 0.06% | 643 | 9.82% | 6,545 |
| Racine | 29,318 | 61.64% | 18,243 | 38.36% | 0 | 0.00% | 11,075 | 23.29% | 47,561 |
| Richland | 2,666 | 61.37% | 1,678 | 38.63% | 0 | 0.00% | 988 | 22.74% | 4,344 |
| Rock | 19,979 | 55.14% | 16,231 | 44.80% | 23 | 0.06% | 3,748 | 10.34% | 36,233 |
| Rusk | 2,697 | 51.67% | 2,523 | 48.33% | 0 | 0.00% | 174 | 3.33% | 5,220 |
| Sauk | 8,191 | 59.99% | 5,458 | 39.97% | 6 | 0.04% | 2,733 | 20.01% | 13,655 |
| Sawyer | 2,530 | 58.96% | 1,757 | 40.95% | 4 | 0.09% | 773 | 18.01% | 4,291 |
| Shawano | 6,690 | 64.35% | 3,705 | 35.64% | 2 | 0.02% | 2,985 | 28.71% | 10,397 |
| Sheboygan | 18,903 | 60.93% | 12,118 | 39.06% | 5 | 0.02% | 6,785 | 21.87% | 31,026 |
| St. Croix | 7,052 | 53.37% | 6,158 | 46.61% | 3 | 0.02% | 894 | 6.77% | 13,213 |
| Taylor | 3,280 | 57.26% | 2,443 | 42.65% | 5 | 0.09% | 837 | 14.61% | 5,728 |
| Trempealeau | 3,566 | 47.85% | 3,878 | 52.04% | 8 | 0.11% | -312 | -4.19% | 7,452 |
| Vernon | 3,945 | 53.48% | 3,426 | 46.44% | 6 | 0.08% | 519 | 7.04% | 7,377 |
| Vilas | 5,003 | 68.18% | 2,331 | 31.77% | 4 | 0.05% | 2,672 | 36.41% | 7,338 |
| Walworth | 11,937 | 64.92% | 6,447 | 35.06% | 3 | 0.02% | 5,490 | 29.86% | 18,387 |
| Washburn | 2,743 | 55.46% | 2,201 | 44.50% | 2 | 0.04% | 542 | 10.96% | 4,946 |
| Washington | 15,983 | 70.58% | 6,662 | 29.42% | 0 | 0.00% | 9,321 | 41.16% | 22,645 |
| Waukesha | 61,002 | 71.19% | 24,679 | 28.80% | 13 | 0.02% | 36,323 | 42.39% | 85,694 |
| Waupaca | 7,227 | 66.57% | 3,619 | 33.34% | 10 | 0.09% | 3,608 | 33.24% | 10,856 |
| Waushara | 3,300 | 63.49% | 1,896 | 36.48% | 2 | 0.04% | 1,404 | 27.01% | 5,198 |
| Winnebago | 25,972 | 64.58% | 14,187 | 35.28% | 57 | 0.14% | 11,785 | 29.30% | 40,216 |
| Wood | 11,540 | 59.64% | 7,811 | 40.36% | 0 | 0.00% | 3,729 | 19.27% | 19,351 |
| Total | 802,321 | 58.15% | 576,280 | 41.77% | 1,126 | 0.08% | 226,041 | 16.38% | 1,379,727 |

==== Counties that flipped from Democratic to Republican ====
- Bayfield
- Chippewa
- Douglas
- Eau Claire
- Iron
- Kenosha
- Milwaukee
- Pierce
- Polk
- Portage
- St. Croix
