= 1994 Wisconsin gubernatorial election =

- November 8, 1994
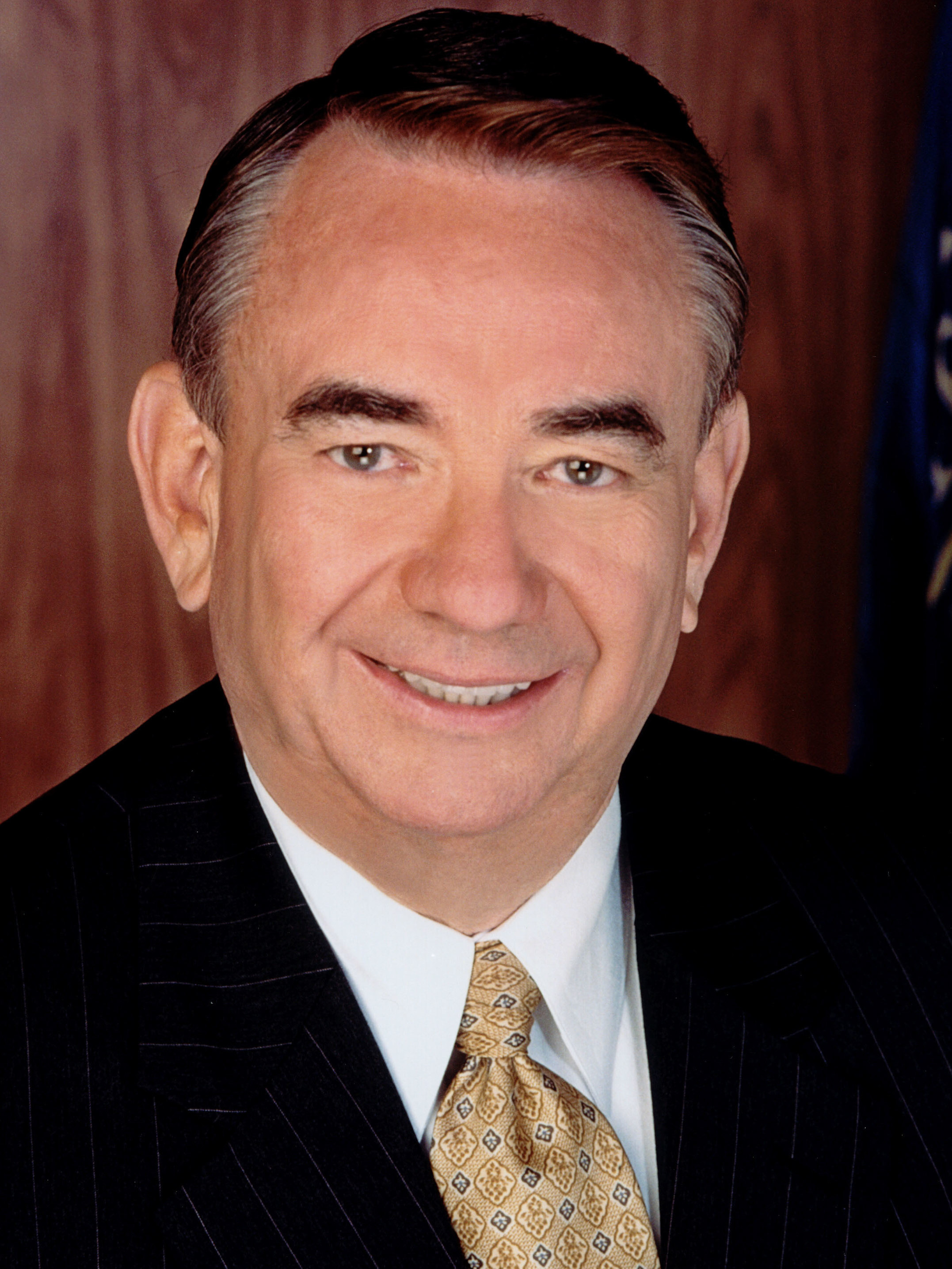

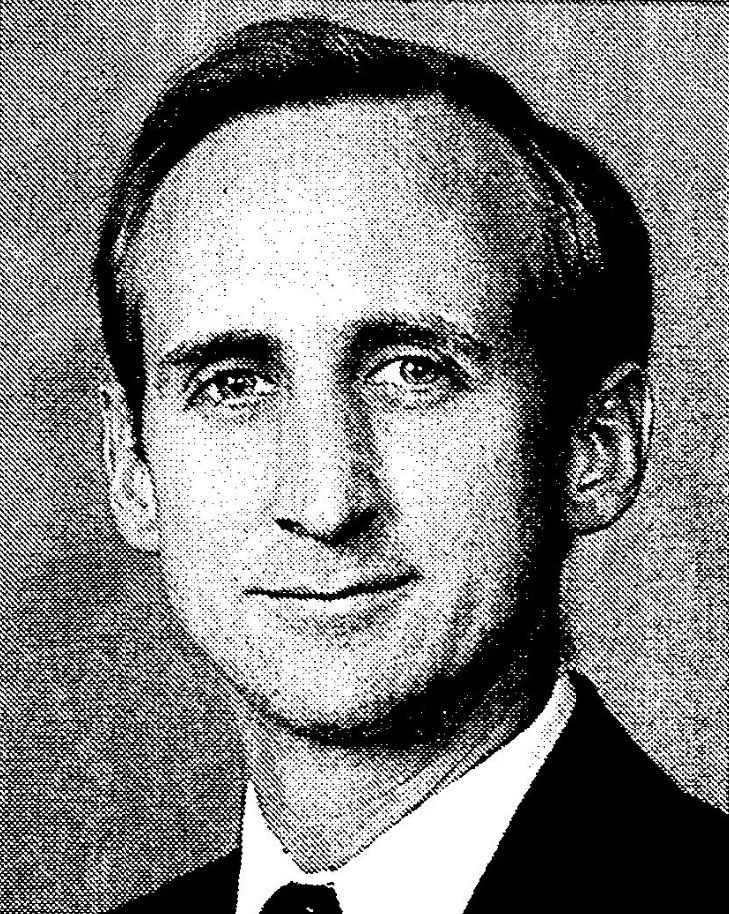
Nominee	Tommy Thompson	Charles Chvala
Party	Republican	Democratic
Running mate	Scott McCallum	Dorothy K. Dean
Popular vote	1,051,326	482,850
Percentage	67.23%	30.88%
- Thompson: 40–50% 50–60% 60–70% 70–80% 80–90% >90% Chvala: 40–50% 50–60% 60–70% 70–80% 80–90% >90% Tie
Governor before election
Tommy G. Thompson
Republican
Elected Governor
Tommy G. Thompson
Republican

The 1994 Wisconsin gubernatorial election was held on November 8, 1994. In the midst of the Republican Revolution, incumbent Republican governor Tommy Thompson won the election with a landslide 67% of the vote, winning a third term as Governor of Wisconsin.

Thompson's share of the popular vote was the highest received by any gubernatorial candidate in Wisconsin since 1920. Thompson also won 71 of Wisconsin's 72 counties, losing only Menominee County by 20 votes. This is the most recent gubernatorial election in which Dane County (containing Wisconsin's capital of Madison), as well as Ashland, Bayfield, and Douglas counties, have voted for the Republican candidate.

== Primary election ==
The primary election was held on September 13, 1994. Nominees for Governor and Lieutenant Governor were selected in separate primaries before running on a joint ticket in the general election.

=== Republican party ===
==== Governor ====
===== Candidates =====
- Tommy G. Thompson, incumbent governor

===== Results =====
Republican gubernatorial primary results
Party	Candidate	Votes	%
Republican	Tommy G. Thompson (incumbent)	321,487	100.00%
Total votes		321,487	100.00%

==== Lieutenant Governor ====
===== Candidates =====
- Scott McCallum, incumbent lieutenant governor

===== Results =====
Republican lieutenant gubernatorial primary results
Party	Candidate	Votes	%
Republican	Scott McCallum (incumbent)	279,858	100.00%
Total votes		279,858	100.00%

=== Democratic party ===
==== Governor ====
===== Candidates =====
- Charles Chvala, member of Wisconsin Senate

===== Results =====
Democratic gubernatorial primary results
Party	Candidate	Votes	%
Democratic	Charles Chvala	121,916	100.00%
Total votes		121,916	100.00%

==== Lieutenant Governor ====
===== Candidates =====
- Dorothy K. Dean

===== Results =====
Democratic lieutenant gubernatorial primary results
Party	Candidate	Votes	%
Democratic	Dorothy K. Dean	111,682	100.00%
Total votes		111,682	100.00%

=== Libertarian party ===
==== Governor ====
===== Candidates =====
- David S. Harmon

===== Results =====
Libertarian gubernatorial primary results
Party	Candidate	Votes	%
Libertarian	David S. Harmon	1,109	100.00%
Total votes		1,109	100.00%

==== Lieutenant Governor ====
===== Candidates =====
- Kevin J. Robinson

===== Results =====
Libertarian lieutenant gubernatorial primary results
Party	Candidate	Votes	%
Libertarian	Kevin J. Robinson	1,030	100.00%
Total votes		1,030	100.00%

=== US Taxpayers' party ===
==== Governor ====
===== Candidates =====
- Edward J. Frami

===== Results =====
US Taxpayers' gubernatorial primary results
Party	Candidate	Votes	%
U.S. Taxpayers'	Edward J. Frami	856	100.00%
Total votes		856	100.00%

==== Lieutenant Governor ====
===== Candidates =====
- Michael J. O'Hare

===== Results =====
US Taxpayers' lieutenant gubernatorial primary results
Party	Candidate	Votes	%
U.S. Taxpayers'	Michael J. O'Hare	863	100.00%
Total votes		863	100.00%

=== Independent nominations ===
==== Governor ====
===== Candidates =====
- Michael J. Mangan

===== Results =====
Independent gubernatorial primary results
Party	Candidate	Votes	%
Independent	Michael J. Mangan	554	100.00%
Total votes		554	100.00%

== General election ==
=== Candidates ===
- Charles Chvala & Dorothy K. Dean, Democrat
- Tommy G. Thompson & Scott McCallum, Republican
- David S. Harmon & Kevin J. Robinson, Libertarian
- Edward J. Frami & Michael J. O'Hare, US Taxpayers'
- Michael J. Mangan, Independent

=== Results ===
1994 Wisconsin gubernatorial election
Party	Candidate	Votes	%	±%
Republican	Tommy G. Thompson	1,051,326	67.23%	+9.08%
Democratic	Charles Chvala	482,850	30.88%	−10.89%
Libertarian	David S. Harmon	11,639	0.74%	
U.S. Taxpayers'	Edward J. Frami	9,188	0.59%	
Independent	Michael J. Mangan	8,150	0.52%	
	Scattering	682	0.04%	
Majority		568,476	36.35%	
Total votes		1,563,835	100.00%	
Republican hold		Swing	+19.97%	

=== Results by county ===
County	Tommy G. Thompson Republican		Charles Chvala Democratic		All Others Various		Margin		Total votes cast
County	#	%	#	%	#	%	#	%	Total votes cast
Adams	3,165	65.19%	1,609	33.14%	81	1.67%	1,556	32.05%	4,855
Ashland	3,222	60.72%	2,003	37.75%	81	1.53%	1,219	22.97%	5,306
Barron	6,784	62.32%	3,993	36.68%	108	0.99%	2,791	25.64%	10,885
Bayfield	3,256	60.64%	2,051	38.20%	62	1.15%	1,205	22.44%	5,369
Brown	42,299	65.58%	21,120	32.74%	1,080	1.67%	21,179	32.84%	64,499
Buffalo	2,429	62.44%	1,405	36.12%	56	1.44%	1,024	26.32%	3,890
Burnett	3,495	64.61%	1,817	33.59%	97	1.79%	1,678	31.02%	5,409
Calumet	7,706	72.42%	2,745	25.80%	190	1.79%	4,961	46.62%	10,641
Chippewa	11,051	67.88%	4,992	30.66%	238	1.46%	6,059	37.22%	16,281
Clark	6,509	69.03%	2,797	29.66%	123	1.30%	3,712	39.37%	9,429
Columbia	10,286	66.46%	4,828	31.19%	363	2.35%	5,458	35.27%	15,477
Crawford	2,687	62.81%	1,535	35.88%	56	1.31%	1,152	26.93%	4,278
Dane	71,315	51.58%	63,545	45.96%	3,400	2.46%	7,770	5.62%	138,260
Dodge	15,553	74.31%	4,926	23.53%	452	2.16%	10,627	50.77%	20,931
Door	6,375	70.74%	2,475	27.46%	162	1.80%	3,900	43.28%	9,012
Douglas	7,921	62.17%	4,655	36.54%	164	1.29%	3,266	25.64%	12,740
Dunn	5,524	59.54%	3,578	38.56%	176	1.90%	1,946	20.97%	9,278
Eau Claire	16,998	62.47%	9,745	35.82%	466	1.71%	7,253	26.66%	27,209
Florence	1,317	72.80%	474	26.20%	18	1.00%	843	46.60%	1,809
Fond du Lac	19,322	73.43%	6,480	24.63%	511	1.94%	12,842	48.80%	26,313
Forest	1,957	64.42%	1,051	34.60%	30	0.99%	906	29.82%	3,038
Grant	9,589	70.47%	3,829	28.14%	189	1.39%	5,760	42.33%	13,607
Green	6,821	66.17%	3,189	30.94%	298	2.89%	3,632	35.23%	10,308
Green Lake	4,340	76.05%	1,269	22.24%	98	1.72%	3,071	53.81%	5,707
Iowa	4,102	65.37%	2,033	32.40%	140	2.23%	2,069	32.97%	6,275
Iron	2,322	72.90%	830	26.06%	33	1.04%	1,492	46.84%	3,185
Jackson	3,695	65.13%	1,904	33.56%	74	1.30%	1,791	31.57%	5,673
Jefferson	13,779	70.33%	5,369	27.40%	445	2.27%	8,410	42.92%	19,593
Juneau	4,769	75.36%	1,437	22.71%	122	1.93%	3,332	52.65%	6,328
Kenosha	24,618	62.12%	14,264	36.00%	745	1.88%	10,354	26.13%	39,627
Kewaunee	4,454	63.28%	2,466	35.03%	119	1.69%	1,988	28.24%	7,039
La Crosse	19,935	64.51%	10,391	33.63%	574	1.86%	9,544	30.89%	30,900
Lafayette	3,420	68.43%	1,519	30.39%	59	1.18%	1,901	38.04%	4,998
Langlade	4,537	71.16%	1,746	27.38%	93	1.46%	2,791	43.77%	6,376
Lincoln	6,064	65.59%	2,978	32.21%	203	2.20%	3,086	33.38%	9,245
Manitowoc	17,707	68.33%	7,761	29.95%	447	1.72%	9,946	38.38%	25,915
Marathon	26,832	69.72%	10,771	27.99%	882	2.29%	16,061	41.73%	38,485
Marinette	9,272	68.98%	4,019	29.90%	151	1.12%	5,253	39.08%	13,442
Marquette	2,953	68.37%	1,293	29.94%	73	1.69%	1,660	38.43%	4,319
Menominee	423	48.23%	443	50.51%	11	1.25%	-20	-2.28%	877
Milwaukee	176,631	64.58%	90,703	33.16%	6,157	2.25%	85,928	31.42%	273,491
Monroe	7,121	70.44%	2,818	27.88%	170	1.68%	4,303	42.57%	10,109
Oconto	6,306	66.43%	3,074	32.39%	112	1.18%	3,232	34.05%	9,492
Oneida	8,905	69.71%	3,686	28.85%	184	1.44%	5,219	40.85%	12,775
Outagamie	31,036	70.72%	12,208	27.82%	642	1.46%	18,828	42.90%	43,886
Ozaukee	23,041	81.40%	4,765	16.83%	501	1.77%	18,276	64.56%	28,307
Pepin	1,496	63.93%	786	33.59%	58	2.48%	710	30.34%	2,340
Pierce	6,591	66.10%	3,241	32.50%	140	1.40%	3,350	33.59%	9,972
Polk	6,760	62.12%	4,010	36.85%	113	1.04%	2,750	25.27%	10,883
Portage	11,929	60.83%	7,112	36.27%	570	2.91%	4,817	24.56%	19,611
Price	4,288	66.46%	2,093	32.44%	71	1.10%	2,195	34.02%	6,452
Racine	38,302	67.38%	17,326	30.48%	1,217	2.14%	20,976	36.90%	56,845
Richland	4,348	72.94%	1,530	25.67%	83	1.39%	2,818	47.27%	5,961
Rock	27,905	64.03%	15,028	34.48%	649	1.49%	12,877	29.55%	43,582
Rusk	3,287	62.29%	1,917	36.33%	73	1.38%	1,370	25.96%	5,277
Sauk	9,737	67.59%	4,269	29.63%	401	2.78%	5,468	37.95%	14,407
Sawyer	3,122	70.02%	1,282	28.75%	55	1.23%	1,840	41.26%	4,459
Shawano	7,600	72.48%	2,793	26.64%	92	0.88%	4,807	45.85%	10,485
Sheboygan	25,231	74.58%	8,146	24.08%	453	1.34%	17,085	50.50%	33,830
St. Croix	9,556	65.30%	4,770	32.59%	309	2.11%	4,786	32.70%	14,635
Taylor	4,270	73.33%	1,458	25.04%	95	1.63%	2,812	48.29%	5,823
Trempealeau	4,926	62.46%	2,875	36.45%	86	1.09%	2,051	26.00%	7,887
Vernon	5,423	64.54%	2,825	33.62%	154	1.83%	2,598	30.92%	8,402
Vilas	6,259	73.20%	2,161	25.27%	130	1.52%	4,098	47.93%	8,550
Walworth	16,459	73.04%	5,567	24.70%	509	2.26%	10,892	48.33%	22,535
Washburn	3,435	65.54%	1,740	33.20%	66	1.26%	1,695	32.34%	5,241
Washington	25,436	79.09%	6,109	19.00%	615	1.91%	19,327	60.10%	32,160
Waukesha	92,484	79.92%	21,428	18.52%	1,804	1.56%	71,056	61.41%	115,716
Waupaca	9,131	74.42%	2,972	24.22%	166	1.35%	6,159	50.20%	12,269
Waushara	4,643	72.74%	1,645	25.77%	95	1.49%	2,998	46.97%	6,383
Winnebago	30,652	73.04%	10,641	25.36%	673	1.60%	20,011	47.68%	41,966
Wood	16,213	69.60%	6,537	28.06%	546	2.34%	9,676	41.54%	23,296
Total	1,051,326	67.23%	482,850	30.88%	29,659	1.90%	568,476	36.35%	1,563,835

==== Counties that flipped from Democratic to Republican ====
- Burnett
- Dane
- Dunn
- Trempealeau
