= Sharon Metz =

American politician (1934–2020)

Sharon Kay Metz was a former member of the Wisconsin State Assembly.

== Biography ==
Metz was born on September 13, 1934, in Omro, Wisconsin. She graduated from high school in Winneconne, Wisconsin, before graduating from the University of Wisconsin-Green Bay. Metz was married and had four children. Sharon Kay Metz died on June 19, 2020, in Oshkosh.

== Career ==
Metz was elected to the Assembly in 1974. In 1986, she was a candidate for Lieutenant Governor of Wisconsin. She ran on the Democratic gubernatorial ticket with incumbent Tony Earl. They lost to the Republican ticket made up of future United States Secretary of Health and Human Services Tommy Thompson and future Governor of Wisconsin Scott McCallum.

Party political offices
Preceded by James Flynn	Democratic nominee for Lieutenant Governor of Wisconsin; 1986	Succeeded by Joseph Czarnezki
