= Mark R. Hamilton =

United States Army general

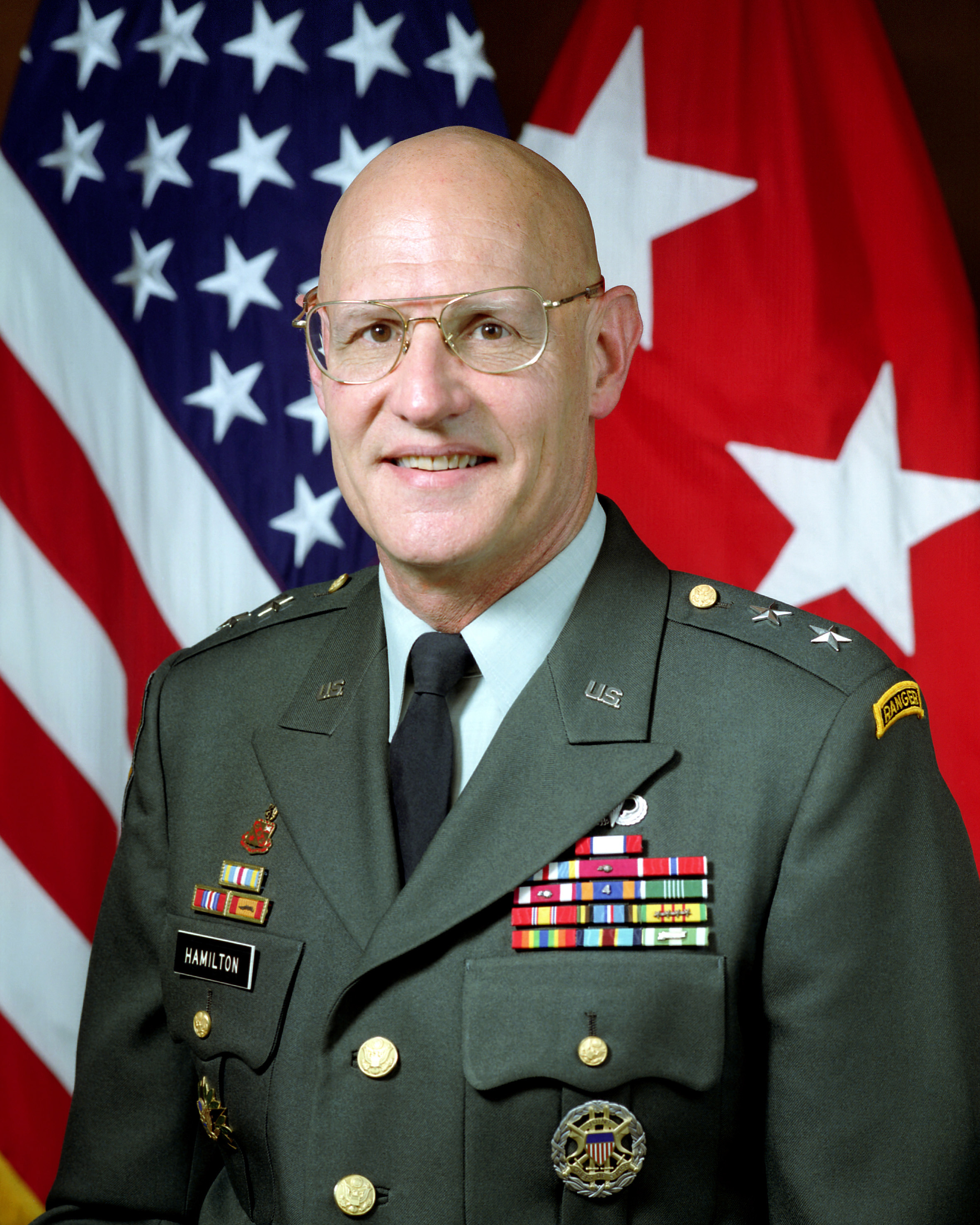
- Hamilton as a Major General in 1996

12th President of the University of Alaska
- In office August 10, 1998 – June 30, 2010
- Preceded by: Wendy Redman (acting)
- Succeeded by: Patrick K. Gamble

Personal details
- Born: February 25, 1945 (age 81)
- Spouse: Patty Hamilton
- Education: Florida State; U.S. Military Academy
- Profession: Academic Administrator; Retired Major General
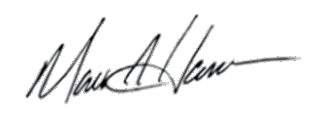
- Signature

Mark Randall Hamilton (born February 25, 1945) is an American academic, and a past president of the University of Alaska. Hamilton graduated with a B.S. degree from the U.S. Military Academy in 1967. He received his master's degree in English literature from Florida State University. Additionally, he graduated from the Armed Forces Staff College in Virginia, and the U.S. Army War College in Pennsylvania. In 1998, he was selected to be the president of the University of Alaska System. Prior to this position, Hamilton served in the United States Army where he earned the rank of major general. His last major military duty post was that of head of recruiting for the Army. He retired with 31 years of service and accepted the president's position at UA soon thereafter.
