= 1968 Wisconsin lieutenant gubernatorial election =

- November 5, 1968
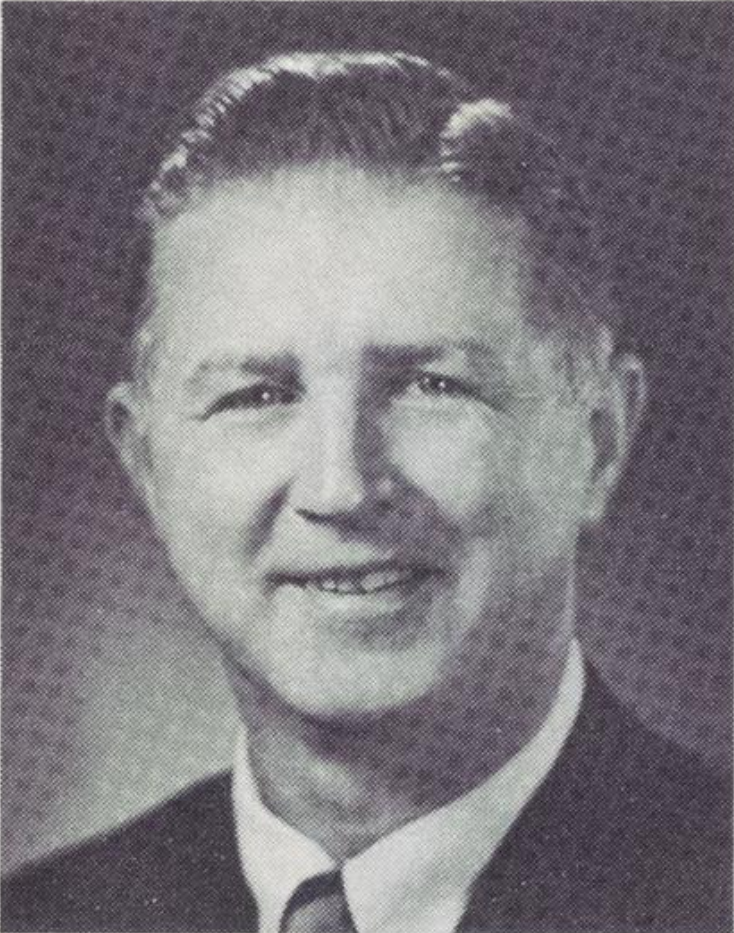

Nominee	Jack B. Olson	Taylor Benson
Party	Republican	Democratic
Popular vote	955,439	654,893
Percentage	59.33%	40.67%
- County results Olson: 50–60% 60–70% 70–80% Benson: 50–60%
Lieutenant Governor before election
Jack B. Olson
Republican
Elected Lieutenant Governor
Jack B. Olson
Republican

The 1968 Wisconsin lieutenant gubernatorial election was held on November 5, 1968. Republican Jack B. Olson won the election with 59% of the vote, winning his fourth term as Lieutenant Governor of Wisconsin and defeating Democrat Taylor Benson. This was the last lieutenant gubernatorial election in Wisconsin where the lieutenant governor was elected to a two-year term separately from the Governor, when a constitutional amendment which made it so the two offices were elected on a single ticket for four years. As part of the amendment, the Lieutenant governor would be elected separately from the governor in primary elections.

This would also serve as Olson's last successful bid for elected office, as he was defeated by his predecessor, Patrick Lucey, in the 1970 Wisconsin gubernatorial election.

== Republican primary ==
=== Candidates ===
==== Nominee ====
- Jack B. Olson, incumbent Lieutenant Governor

=== Results ===
Republican primary results
Party	Candidate	Votes	%
Republican	Jack B. Olson	264,260	100%
Total votes		264,260	100.0

== Democratic primary ==
=== Candidates ===
==== Nominee ====
- Taylor Benson, State Senator from the 28th Senate district

==== Eliminated in primary ====
- David S. Miller

=== Results ===
Primary results by county: Benson: 50–60%; 60–70%; 70–80%; Miller: 50–60%; 60–70%

Democratic primary results
Party	Candidate	Votes	%
Democratic	Taylor Benson	396,302	61.46%
Democratic	David S. Miller	69,572	38.54%
Total votes		758,775	100.0

== General election ==
=== Results ===
1968 Wisconsin lieutenant governor election results
Party	Candidate	Votes	%
Republican	Jack B. Olson (incumbent)	955,439	59.33
Democratic	Taylor Benson	654,893	40.67
Total votes		1,610,332	100.0
Republican hold			
