= Patrick K. Gamble =

United States general

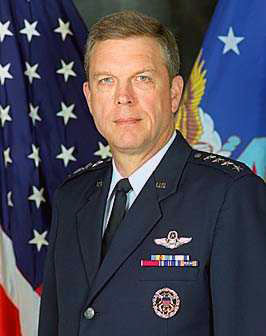
- General Patrick K. Gamble, U.S. Air Force (retired)
- Born: November 12, 1945 (age 80); Fresno, California, United States
- Military career
- Allegiance: United States of America
- Branch: United States Air Force
- Service years: 1967–2001
- Rank: General
- Commands: Pacific Air Forces; Alaskan Command; 11th Air Force; 8th Tactical Fighter Wing; 18th Combat Support Wing; 56th Fighter Wing; 318th FIS
- Conflicts: Vietnam War
- Awards: Legion of Merit; Distinguished Flying Cross; Air Medal (14)

Patrick K. Gamble (born November 12, 1945) is a retired president of the University of Alaska and a retired United States Air Force (USAF) general whose assignments included service as Commander, Pacific Air Forces, Hickam Air Force Base, Hawaii.

Gamble entered the USAF in 1967 through the four-year Reserve Officer Training Corps program at Texas A&M University. He flew 394 combat missions as a forward air controller in the O-1 Bird Dog during the Vietnam War. He has commanded a fighter squadron and three wings. Before assuming his current position, he was deputy chief of staff for air and space operations, Headquarters U.S. Air Force, the Pentagon, Washington, D.C. He retired from the USAF on May 1, 2001.

Following his service in the Air Force, Gamble became a senior executive for the Alaska Railroad, where he succeeded Bill Sheffield as president of the railroad. In 2010, he retired from the railroad and accepted appointment as president of the University of Alaska, succeeding Mark R. Hamilton, himself a retired U.S. Army general. In December 2014 Gamble announced his resignation from the University of Alaska and he was succeeded in September 2015 by Jim Johnsen.

== Education ==
- 1967 Bachelor of Arts degree in mathematics, Texas A&M University, College Station
- 1978 Air Command and Staff College, Maxwell Air Force Base, Alabama
- 1978 Master of Business Administration and management degree, Auburn University, Auburn, Alabama
- 1984 Distinguished graduate, Air War College, Maxwell Air Force Base, Alabama

== Assignments ==
- December 1967 – January 1969, student, undergraduate pilot training, Randolph Air Force Base, Texas
- February 1969 – April 1969, forward air controller training, Hurlburt Field, Florida
- May 1969 – May 1970, forward air controller, O-1 Bird Dog, Duc Hoa Village, South Vietnam
- May 1970 – November 1970, student, F-102 Delta Dagger interceptor training, Perrin Air Force Base, Texas
- November 1970 – January 1971, F-106 Delta Dart upgrade pilot training, Tyndall Air Force Base, Florida
- February 1971 – January 1974, life support officer, F-106 instructor pilot and flight commander, 460th Fighter Interceptor Squadron, Grand Forks Air Force Base, North Dakota
- January 1974 – January 1975, Air Staff Training Assignment, Directorate of Personnel Programs, Headquarters U.S. Air Force, the Pentagon, Washington, D.C.
- January 1975 – July 1977, chief of standardization and evaluation, 87th Fighter Interceptor Squadron, K.I. Sawyer Air Force Base, Michigan
- August 1977 – July 1978, student, Air Command and Staff College, Maxwell Air Force Base, Alabama
- July 1978 – May 1981, chief, Air Threat Analysis Group (Red Team), Project Checkmate, Directorate of Operations and Readiness, Headquarters U.S. Air Force, the Pentagon, Washington, D.C.
- May 1981 – June 1983, commander, 318th Fighter Interceptor Squadron, McChord Air Force Base, Washington
- July 1983 – June 1984, student, Air War College, Maxwell Air Force Base, Alabama
- June 1984 – July 1986, chief, Operations Management and Analysis Division; chief, Contingency Plans Division; deputy director, then director, Personnel Plans and Systems, Headquarters Tactical Air Command, Langley Air Force Base, Virginia
- July 1986 – April 1988, director of operations, then vice commander, 474th Tactical Fighter Wing, Nellis Air Force Base, Nevada
- April 1988 – June 1989, commander, 18th Combat Support Wing, Kadena Air Base, Japan
- June 1989 – June 1990, commander, 8th Tactical Fighter Wing, Kunsan Air Base, South Korea
- June 1990 – June 1992, executive officer to the Air Force chief of staff, Headquarters U.S. Air Force, the Pentagon, Washington, D.C.
- August 1992 – June 1993, commander, 58th Fighter Wing, Luke Air Force Base, Arizona
- June 1993 – November 1994, commandant of cadets and commander, 34th Training Wing, U.S. Air Force Academy, Colorado Springs, Colorado
- November 1994 – August 1996, assistant chief of staff, Operations and Logistics Division, Supreme Headquarters Allied Powers Europe, Belgium
- August 1996 – November 1997, commander, Alaskan Command, Alaskan North American Aerospace Defense Command Region, 11th Air Force and Joint Task Force-Alaska, Elmendorf Air Force Base, Alaska
- November 1997 – July 1998, deputy chief of staff, Air and Space Operations, Headquarters U.S. Air Force, the Pentagon, Washington, D.C.
- July 1998 – 2001, commander, Pacific Air Forces, Hickam Air Force Base, Hawaii

== Flight information ==
- Rating: Command pilot
- Flight hours: More than 3,100
- Aircraft flown: O-1, F-102, F-106, F-16A/C and F-15C

== Major awards and decorations ==
- Defense Distinguished Service Medal with oak leaf cluster
- Air Force Distinguished Service Medal with oak leaf cluster
- Legion of Merit
- Distinguished Flying Cross
- Meritorious Service Medal with two oak leaf clusters
- Air Medal with 13 oak leaf clusters
- Air Force Commendation Medal
- Army Presidential Unit Citation with oak leaf cluster
- Air Force Outstanding Unit Award with "V" device and three oak leaf clusters
- Vietnam Service Medal with three service stars
- Republic of Vietnam Gallantry Cross with service star
- Republic of Vietnam Staff Service Honor Medal First Class
- Republic of Vietnam Gallantry Cross with Palm
- NATO Medal

== Other achievements ==
- 1976 Member, William Tell Air-to-Air Weapons Competition Team, 87th Fighter Interceptor Squadron
- 1982 Team leader, William Tell Air-to-Air Competition Team, 318th Fighter Interceptor Squadron

== Effective dates of promotion ==
- Second Lieutenant December 13, 1967
- First Lieutenant June 13, 1969
- Captain December 13, 1970
- Major June 1, 1976
- Lieutenant Colonel September 1, 1980
- Colonel September 1, 1985
- Brigadier General November 1, 1991
- Major General September 28, 1994
- Lieutenant General September 1, 1996
- General October 1, 1998

Business positions
Preceded by Bill Sheffield	President of Alaska Railroad; 2001-2010	Succeeded by Christopher Aadnesen
Preceded by Mark R. Hamilton	President of University of Alaska; 2010-2015	Succeeded by Jim Johnsen
