= Lucille Berrien =

American political activist (1928–2026)

- Born: April 12, 1928
- Died: May 22, 2026 (aged 98)
- Occupation: Activist
- Political party: Black Panther Party
- Other political affiliations: Labor–Farm Party of Wisconsin (later)

Lucille M. Berrien (April 12, 1928 – May 22, 2026) was an American activist from Milwaukee, Wisconsin, and a member of the Black Panther Party. She was the first African-American to run for mayor of Milwaukee.

== Background ==
Berrien was born on April 12, 1928. She got married at the age of 16 and had her first child at 17. At the age of 24, in 1953, her husband was killed in the Korean War. Berrien subsequently moved with her two young children to Milwaukee. She worked for a time as a domestic worker in Bayside and Whitefish Bay homes.

== Political career ==
Berrien ran for mayor of Milwaukee in 1972, becoming the first African-American woman to do so, but lost the race to incumbent Henry Maier. Though she had recently joined the Black Panther Party, she ran a non-partisan race for mayor. Berrien also ran for State Treasurer of Wisconsin in 1990 with the Labor–Farm Party of Wisconsin, but lost to Cathy Zeuske.

She was a supporter of Milwaukee Alderperson Michael McGee Jr., even after his 2008 convictions for bribery and extortion, believing he was set up by the government. She was also good friends with fellow Open housing advocate James Groppi.

Berrien supported Vietnam Veterans Against the War and helped found People’s Coalition for Peace and Justice. She was also on the board of Legal Action of Wisconsin for over 40 years.

== Later life and death ==
On June 16, 2010, Berrien had a stroke. She recovered and continued to reside in Milwaukee with her 13 grandchildren, 20 great-grandchildren and five great-great-grandchildren.

In 2013, the Black Health Coalition of Wisconsin honored Berrien with one of the inaugural Community Health Champion Awards.

In April 2021, there was an effort to rename a Milwaukee park then named for Charles Lindbergh in her honor. On October 23, 2021, the name of the park was officially changed in her honor to "Lucille Berrien Park." As of May 28, 2023, the park has a mural depicting Berrien.

From 2021, there has been an annual Lucille Berrien Humanitarian Award named in her honor.

Berrien died on May 22, 2026, at the age of 98.
