= Jim Johnsen =

State of Alaska Education official

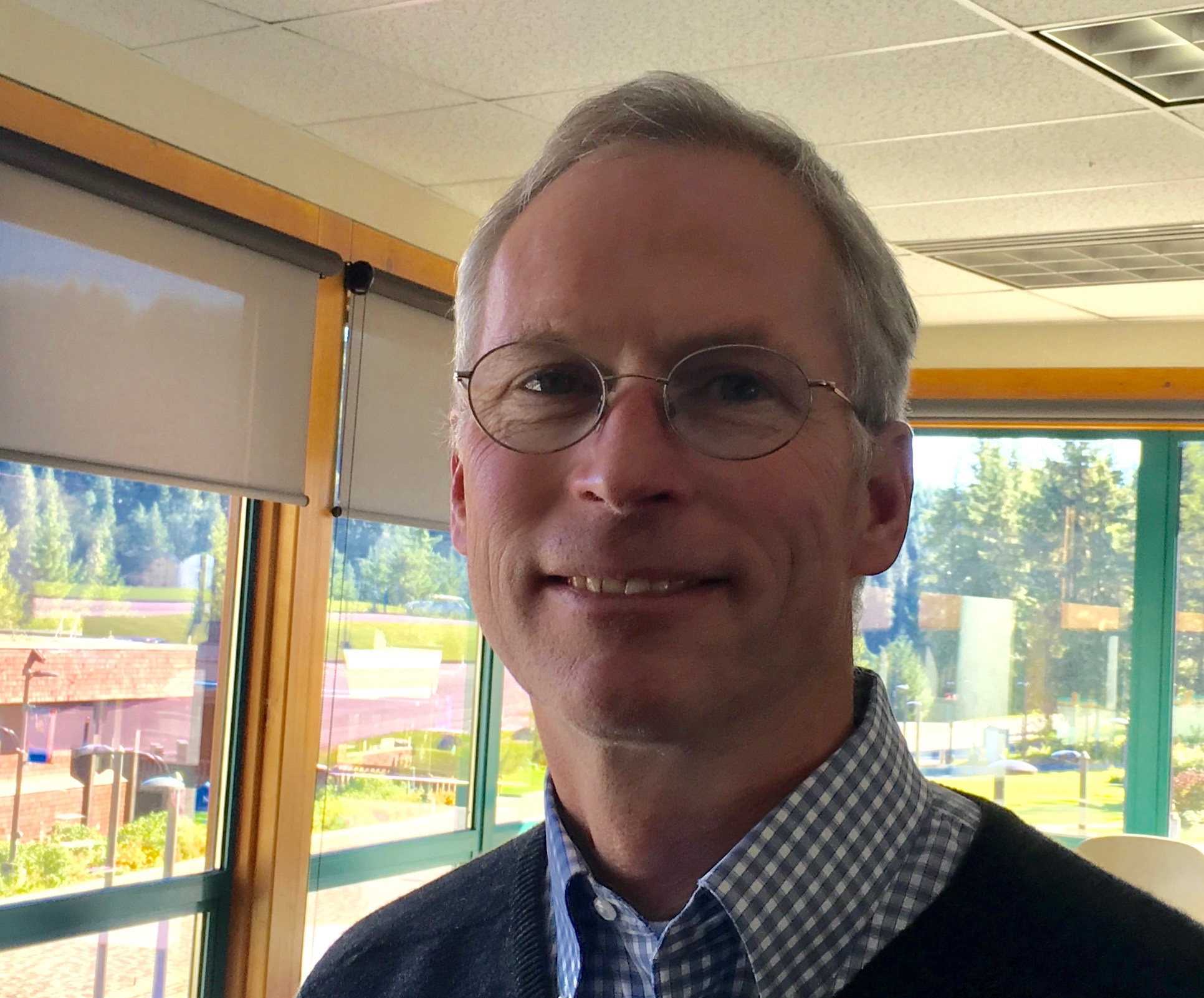

14th President of the University of Alaska system
- In office July 28, 2015 – July 1, 2020
- Preceded by: Patrick K. Gamble
- Succeeded by: Pat Pitney

Personal details
- Education: University of California, Santa Cruz (BA); University of Chicago (MA); University of Pennsylvania (EdD)

James Roland Johnsen is an American academic and businessman. He has served in several public and private sector roles during his career, most notably as the 14th president of the University of Alaska system from July 2015 until July 2020.

== Education ==
His education includes a BA in politics from the University of California, Santa Cruz, master's in political science from the University of Chicago, and an EdD in higher education management from the University of Pennsylvania.

== Career ==
=== Early career ===
Prior to joining the university, Johnsen held executive leadership positions in the private sector with Alaska Communications and with Doyon, Limited, and in higher education at the University of Minnesota and the University of Alaska between 1992-2008 in executive roles including director of labor relations, vice president of administration and chief of staff. He was also a visiting scholar at the Center for Studies in Higher Education at the University of California, Berkeley in 2002.

=== President of University of Alaska system ===
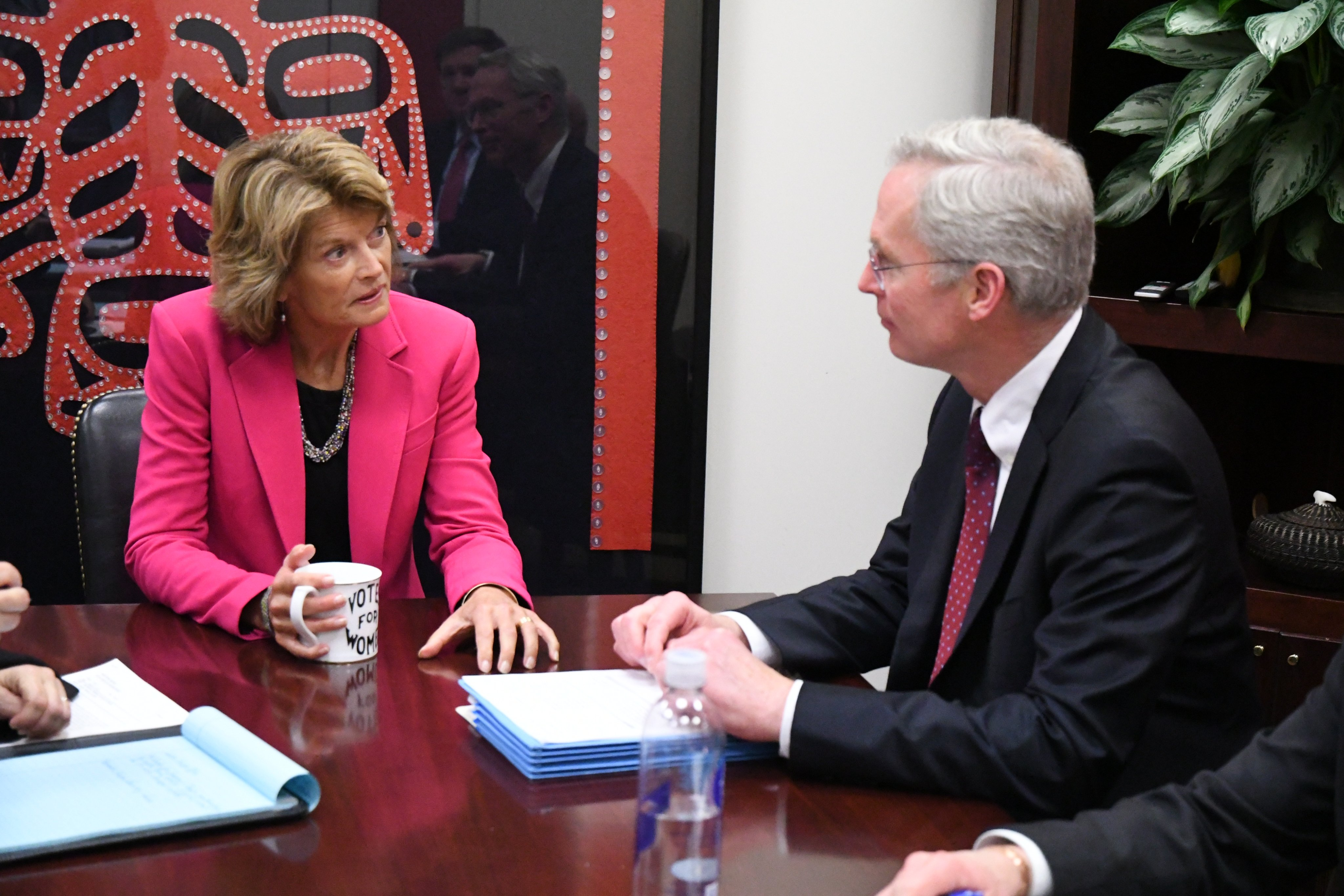
Johnsen meeting with Senator Lisa Murkowski in 2020.

Johnsen was appointed the president of the University of Alaska system on July 28, 2015. As the system president, his priorities included a systemwide Title IX compliance effort, remedying UA's historic land grant deficit, restructuring of academic programs and administrative services of the university to increase student success and reduce cost, aligning with Alaska's primary and secondary education sectors, and a systemwide push to achieve the State of Alaska's goal for 65 percent of Alaska's working age population to have a post-secondary degree or certificate of value by 2025.

==== University of Alaska System budget cuts ====
Johnsen assumed the role of president during a period of budget cuts following the state of Alaska’s loss of income from collapsed oil revenues. In March 2016, Johnsen said the university system would have to continue to cut back significantly. At the same time, Johnsen made a public case for supporting Alaska's higher education system, extolling the virtues of education and the role the university can play in bolstering the state's economy.

In July 2019, Alaska governor Mike Dunleavy announced he was using his line-item veto powers to cut the University of Alaska System’s state funding by $130 million, or 41% of its total budget. The cuts were widely condemned, including by Johnsen, University of Alaska trustees, and public officials from across the political spectrum. The outcry led to hearings being held by the Alaska State Legislature about a possible veto override; Johnsen was the first person to testify in these hearings. Johnsen led a negotiation effort on behalf of the university with Dunleavy, which ultimately resulted in the governor and the Board of Regents agreeing in August 2019 to cut $70 million of the university system’s budget – about half the size of the original cuts the governor had planned to make.

==== Votes of No Confidence ====
The financial situation and Johnsen’s proposed “Strategic Pathways” plan to facilitate budget cuts caused friction within the university system and led to a “non-binding vote of faculty sentiment” of no confidence being passed 28-9 by the Faculty Senate at the University of Alaska-Anchorage in January 2017. The following month the Faculty Senate of the University of Alaska-Fairbanks also passed a resolution of no-confidence related to the “Strategic Pathways” plan, by a vote of 26-12. Later that year, Johnsen, in response to direction from the Board of Regents, proposed creating a single university, combining the system’s three separate universities, as a way of mitigating the budget cuts. After opposition by the three university chancellors, the University of Alaska’s Board of Regents voted to keep the system in place. Johnsen later said he acted too hastily because he was still operating in “crisis mode.”

==== Candidacy for University of Wisconsin System President ====
In May 2020, Johnsen was announced as the sole finalist for the job of University of Wisconsin System President. The announcement was met with concerns among university system faculty and students over the way that the search had been conducted. Johnsen withdrew his name from consideration for the University of Wisconsin System job in June 2020 because of the controversy.

==== Resignation ====
Johnsen tendered his resignation amid blowback from the Wisconsin job search, among other reasons. Johnsen's resignation was accepted by the University of Alaska Board of Regents on June 22, 2020. He continued to be the president until July 1, 2020.

=== Vice President of Executive Search, Greenwood Asher & Associates ===
Johnsen joined Greenwood Asher and Associates as a Vice President of Executive Search in 2022. He has successfully led searches to fill positions such as presidents, chancellors, vice presidents, deans, and other leadership roles within higher education institutions.

=== Affiliate Faculty, Center for Studies in Higher Education, University of California, Berkeley ===
Since 2022, Johnsen has been an affiliate faculty member at the UC Berkeley Center for Studies in Higher Education.

=== Member, Advisory Board, MacPherson Eye Research Institute, University of Wisconsin, Madison ===
Beginning in 2022, Johnsen is serving on the advisory board of the MacPherson Eye Research Institute, University of Wisconsin-Madison].

=== Senior Fellow, National Association of Higher Education Systems (NASH) ===
From 2020 to 2022, Johnsen was a Senior Fellow at the National Association of System Heads where he worked with leaders and scholars on a major “rethink” of the role of public university systems. Following his time at NASH, he was appointed as Affiliate Faculty at the Center for Studies in Higher Education at the University of California, Berkeley.

=== Publications ===
Johnsen has contributed extensively to the field of higher education through various publications. He has edited a forthcoming book titled “Public University Systems: Leveraging Scale for Higher Education” (Johns Hopkins University Press, 2024). He also authored the paper “Public University Systems and the Benefits of Scale,” published in the Research and Occasional Paper Series by the Center for Studies in Higher Education at the University of California Berkeley in 2024. Additionally, Johnsen co-authored the article “Leveraging the Power of Systemness to Improve the Success of Students and Society” with Martin, Zimpher, and Lane, published in Change: The Magazine of Higher Learning. Furthermore, he contributed the chapter “Opportunities for Collective Bargaining to Advance Higher Education through Clarity of Role and Process” Unions on Campus: Managing Labor-Management Relationships Proactively, Fairly and Efficiently, edited by Daniel J. Julius.

=== Public Service ===
Johnsen is a commissioner on the Western Interstate Commission for Higher Education, a commissioner on the Denali Commission and a member of the board of directors of the Alaska Aerospace Corporation. He is past chair of the Alaska EPSCoR, chair of the Alaska Commission on Postsecondary Education, vice-chair of the Alaska Student Loan Corporation, vice-chair of the University of Alaska Foundation, and member of the Board of Directors of the National Association of System Heads.
