= Taylor Benson =

American politician

Taylor M. Benson (November 2, 1926 – September 25, 2004) was a member of the Wisconsin State Senate.

== Biography ==
Benson was born in Milwaukee, Wisconsin to Marguerite Regan and Charles Carpenter Benson. He had a brother John, born 5 years earlier. He attended high school in Los Angeles, California before graduating from the University of Notre Dame. During World War II and the Korean War, he served in the United States Army Air Forces and the United States Air Force. He was a journalist by trade.

Benson was a member of the Air Force Association, the Reserve Officers Association, the Sons of the American Revolution, the Christian Family Movement, the Confraternity of Christian Doctrine and the National Press Club.

Benson married Carol Marie Bauhs in January 1954. Together, they had four children: Kevin Charles, Mary Victoria, Geoffrey Regan, and Pamela Maureen.

== Political career ==
Benson was elected to the Senate in 1964 and became Assistant Minority Leader. He was a Democrat.

Party political offices
Preceded by Martin J. Schreiber	Democratic nominee for Lieutenant Governor of Wisconsin; 1968	Succeeded by Martin J. Schreiber
