= Labor–Farm Party of Wisconsin =

Labor-Farm Party of Wisconsin
- Chairman: William Osborne Hart
- Spokesperson: Owen Coyle
- Deputy Leader: Dennis Boyer
- Founded: 1982
- Dissolved: 1987
- Ideology: Left-wing

The Labor–Farm Party of Wisconsin (also Wisconsin Labor and Farm Party, or LFP) was an independent left-leaning political party in the state of Wisconsin. In 1984, William Osborne Hart, one of the party's founders, intended to run for President of the United States and failed due to a Wisconsin Supreme Court deliberation. This, as well as other factors, led to the party's dissolution.

== History ==
The party was active in Wisconsin politics during 1982–1987. The party was formed "in reaction to the resurgence of conservatism as a political force in the 1980s". Its platform demanded larger government intervention with regard to factory and farm operations, protecting farmers' and workers' welfare, and shared civil rights concepts with members of the "Rainbow Coalition" of feminists, the LGBT lobby, as well as included other notions.

Before the 1984 presidential election, the LFP wanted for William Hart, one of the party's founders, to run as a presidential candidate. This failed due to a Supreme Court of Wisconsin decision.

The party concentrated its efforts in an attempt to defeat Les Aspin in 1986, then Wisconsin's 1st congressional district Representative. The Labor and Farm Party was generally not successful, a reason which led to its dissolution in 1987. However, Lucille Berrien ran for State Treasurer of Wisconsin in 1990 with the LFP, but lost to Cathy Zeuske. Several party members then went on to form the Progressive Party and the Wisconsin Green Party in the 1990s.

After Hart's resignation, Kathryn Christensen became its de facto head. Mary K. Baum ran for minor offices in 1986 on its ticket and for Governor as an independent.
