= Republican Party of Wisconsin =

Wisconsin affiliate of the Republican Party

- Chairperson: Brian Schimming
- Senate Leader: Mary Felzkowski (President); Devin LeMahieu (Majority Leader)
- Assembly Leader: Robin Vos (Speaker); Tyler August (Majority Leader)
- Founded: March 20, 1854, in Ripon
- Headquarters: Madison, Wisconsin
- Student wing: Wisconsin Federation of College Republicans
- Youth wing: Wisconsin Young Republicans
- Ideology: Conservatism; Right-wing populism
- National affiliation: Republican Party
- Colors: Red
- U.S. Senate (Wisconsin seats): 1 / 2
- U.S. House (Wisconsin seats): 6 / 8
- Statewide offices: 1 / 5
- Seats in the Wisconsin Senate: 18 / 33
- Seats in the Wisconsin Assembly: 54 / 99

Election symbol

Website
- www.wisgop.org

The Republican Party of Wisconsin is a conservative and populist political party in Wisconsin and is the Wisconsin affiliate of the United States Republican Party (GOP). The state party chair is Brian Schimming. The state party is divided into 72 county parties for each of the state's counties, as well as organizations for the state's eight congressional districts. It currently controls the majority of Wisconsin's U.S. House seats, one of its U.S. Senate seats, and has majorites in both houses of the state legislature.

== History ==
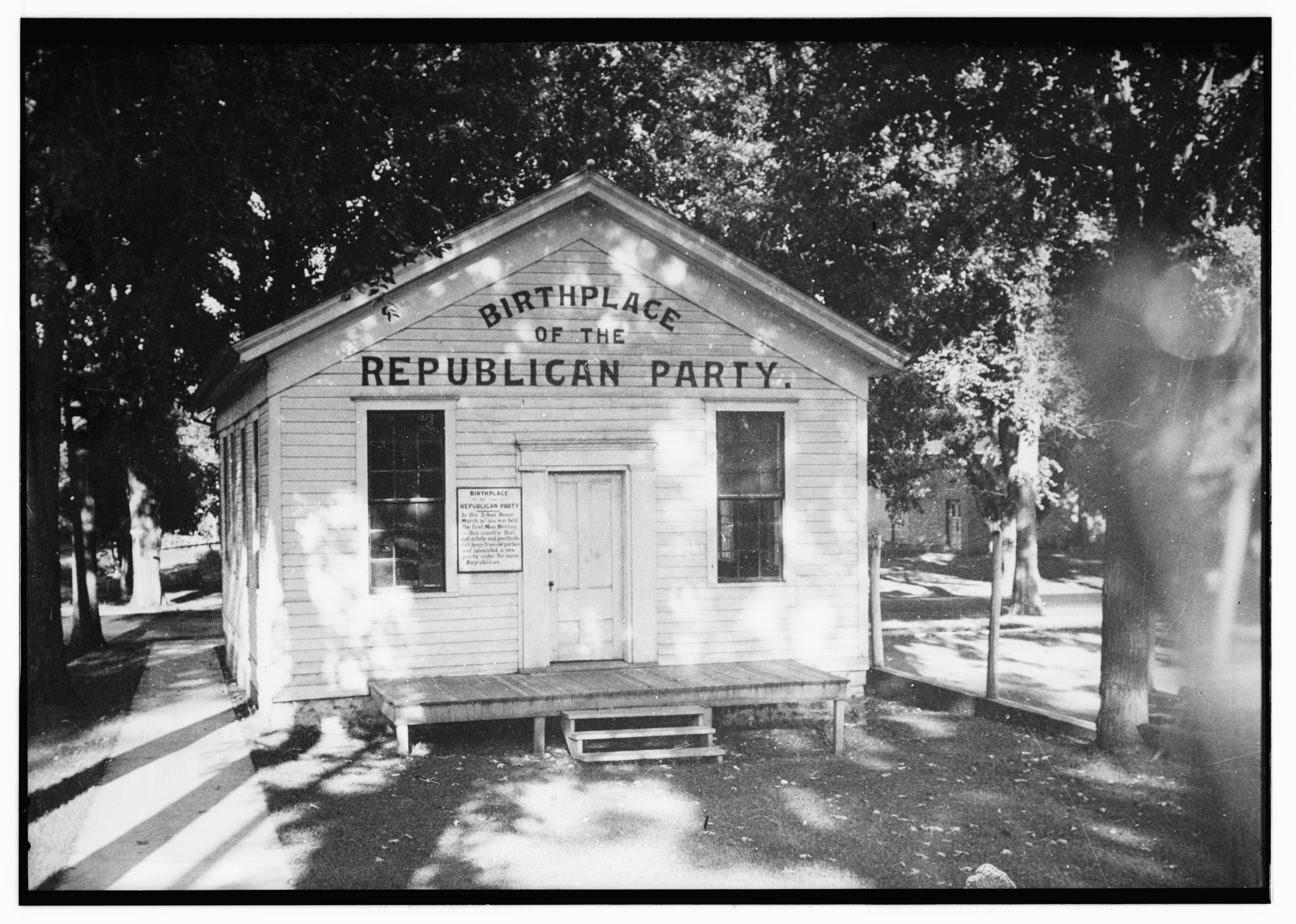
Old photo of the Little White Schoolhouse. Birthplace of the Republican Party.

After the introduction in Congress of the Kansas–Nebraska bill in January 1854, many meetings were held in protest across the country. The meeting held in Ripon, Wisconsin on March 20, 1854, is commonly cited as the birth of the Republican Party in the United States due to it being the first publicized anti-slavery meeting to propose a new party with its name being Republican.

=== Origins of the Republican Party in Wisconsin ===
Before the meeting in Ripon, an alliance existed between state Whigs, whose national party had weakened, and members of the Free Soil Party, with whom they formed a "people's ticket" as early as 1842. The coalition succeeded in electing the chief justice of the state supreme court, a Milwaukee mayor and aldermen. Many Wisconsin Democrats were also opposed to the Kansas–Nebraska bill, which not only would leave the question of slavery in the territories up to popular sovereignty, but as originally amended would also deny immigrants the right to vote or hold public office. The bill was roundly condemned in the Wisconsin press, as editors such as Horace Rublee (Wisconsin State Journal), Rufus King (Milwaukee Sentinel) and Sherman Booth (Waukesha Free Democrat) encouraged the formation of a new party by calling for an anti-Nebraska convention at the state capitol in Madison. At a large meeting in Milwaukee on February 13, Booth led a committee that drafted many of the resolutions that would later be the basis for other anti-Nebraska meetings in the state, including the famous meeting in Ripon.

=== Birth of the Republican Party ===
The organizer of the meeting that gave birth to America's Republican Party was New York state native Alvan Earle Bovay, a lawyer and mathematics teacher at Ripon College. In 1852 Bovay traveled to New York City during the national Whig Party convention and met with old friend and New York Tribune editor Horace Greeley. Bovay suggested the name "Republican" for a new anti-slavery party that would replace the fading Whigs. He favored it because it was a simple word rather than a compound name like Free Soil or Free Democrat, that it could be used as either a noun or an adjective, that it would remind people of Thomas Jefferson's affiliation, and that it symbolized what he believed the new party should represent: "Res Publica," synonymous with commonwealth. Bovay also believed that the name would attract immigrant voters that had recently fled monarchies.

On February 26, 1854, Bovay sent a letter to Greeley urging him to editorialize about a new Republican party, without result. In the meantime he organized a public meeting at the Congregational Church in Ripon on March 1, where resolutions were passed condemning the Nebraska bill and promising a new party if it became law. The Senate passed the bill two days later, which prompted Bovay to organize another meeting in Ripon at Schoolhouse Dist. No. 2 on March 20, 1854, at 6:30 p.m. Composed of Whigs, Democrats and Free Soilers, 54 of Ripon's 100 voters filled the schoolhouse to capacity and were nearly unanimous in their support of a new party with Bovay's suggested name Republican. Bovay wrote Greeley on June 4 urging him to publicize the name before Michigan and Wisconsin held their state anti-Nebraska conventions, which Greeley did in a Tribune editorial on June 24.

=== Organizing the Republican Party of Wisconsin ===
On June 9 Sherman Booth repeated the call for a mass convention in Madison, and suggested July 13, the anniversary of the Northwest Ordinance of 1787 that had banned slavery in the Northwest Territory. Other Wisconsin editors concurred and publicized the convention.

Beginning in the capitol's assembly chamber, the state convention was moved outdoors due to the many delegates and supporters arriving, with the crowd topping one thousand. The proceedings were run by experienced Whigs and Free Soilers, with editors Booth and King controlling the platform and nominating officers from all three major parties. Resolutions included abrogating the Fugitive Slave Act, re-instating Kansas and Nebraska as free states and banning all future slave states. They also resolved to invite all persons "whether of native or foreign birth" to join the party, and a committee was assigned to establish a Republican German newspaper in Milwaukee. All resolutions were passed unanimously, and nine hearty cheers went up for the state's new Republican Party.

After winning over much of the foreign-language press, the new party was very successful in the fall elections, helped greatly by the fact that the state Democrats were deeply split over the Kansas-Nebraska Act. The Republicans elected two of Wisconsin's three congressmen (Cadwallader C. Washburn and Charles Billinghurst), as well as winning enough seats in the state legislature to elect the country's first Republican senator, Charles Durkee. By 1857 they not only controlled the governorship and the state legislature by large majorities, but also held all three Congressional seats and both U.S. Senate seats.

Despite such electoral domination, the Republican party was split over many issues. Many former Whigs pressed for temperance legislation, resulting in charges of nativism from many of the Germans brought into the party by Carl Schurz. United by national events like the Dred Scot decision, abolitionists still drove the party agenda, but were criticized for showing more concern for the black slave than for the white man. Following Sherman Booth's role in inciting the liberation of runaway slave Joshua Glover from a Milwaukee jail in 1854, many Republicans championed the issue of states' rights, declaring the Fugitive Slave Law effectively repealed in Wisconsin. Some in the party anticipated a confrontation with the federal government. Governor Alexander Randall ordered an Irish militia disbanded because he doubted their loyalty to Wisconsin. Many in the militia subsequently perished in the shipwreck of the Lady Elgin.

=== The Civil War era ===
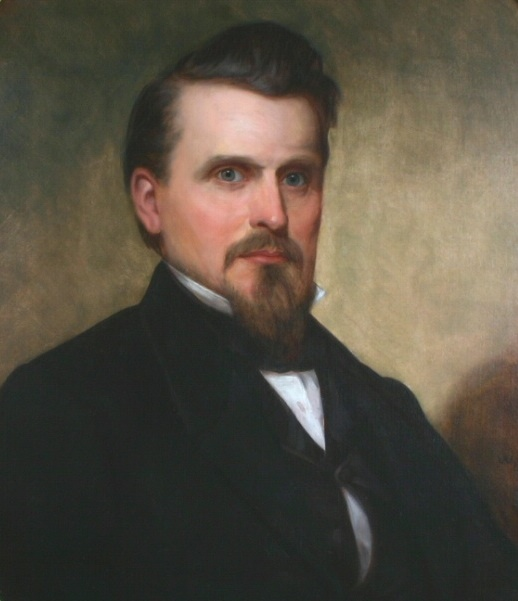
James T. Lewis was the Republican Governor of Wisconsin, at the end of the American Civil War.

The Wisconsin delegation to the 1860 Republican convention backed Senator William Seward for president, but quickly supported Abraham Lincoln once his nomination appeared inevitable. Following the outbreak of the Civil War, governors like Randall and Edward Salomon vigorously endorsed the war and mustered thousands of troops to meet the federal quotas, later resorting to a draft.

Politically, the Civil War was a boon to the Republicans. Returning officers like Brigadier General Lucius Fairchild, who had lost an arm at Gettysburg, were the perfect spokesmen for the party. Fairchild later became a three-term governor. Republicans could forever claim they fought to preserve the Union, and veterans of the Grand Army of the Republic became a powerful constituency.

The state Republican chairman from 1859 to 1869 was Wisconsin State Journal editor Horace Rublee, who with former governor Randall, Madison postmaster Elisha W. Keyes and others became known as the "Madison Regency." Randall later became President Andrew Johnson's postmaster general, and with Keyes they steered federal patronage jobs to political allies and strengthened the party's hold on the statehouse. Despite such power the state Republicans were divided into factions, with the more ideological members opposed to Johnson's vetoes of Freedman legislation and President Ulysses S. Grant's corrupt administration (many later joining Carl Schurz's Liberal Republican Party in 1872). Another faction of patronage-seekers and loyal veterans supported Grant as a bulwark against what they saw as a traitorous Democratic Party. Nevertheless, the Republicans would continue to dominate Wisconsin government for the next six decades with few interruptions.

=== The 1870s and 1880s ===
Rublee ran a quiet campaign in the legislature for possible election as U.S. Senator, but after losing to Matthew H. Carpenter, Rublee was appointed by Grant minister to Switzerland in 1869. The party machinery was left in the hands of "Boss" Keyes. Yet the Industrial Age hailed a shift of Republican power away from Madison, to wealthy men like Philetus Sawyer of Oshkosh, whose lumber fortune would help fund the party and advance him from mayor to state legislator to congressman to U.S. senator. Milwaukee's Henry C. Payne rose from dry goods dealer to the Young Men's Republican Club, where he engineered a voter registration drive among the city's immigrants to vote the Republican ticket. In 1876 Payne was appointed Milwaukee's postmaster, a powerful source of patronage jobs. He later became wealthy as a manager of banks, utilities and railroads. John C. Spooner of Hudson was the principal attorney for the West Wisconsin Railroad, and his manipulation of land grants into Sawyer's hands contributed to his future as party insider, and later, U.S. senator alongside Sawyer. Upon his return from Europe Rublee resumed the chairmanship of the party. With help from backers, he purchased the Milwaukee Sentinel in 1882 and was its editor until his death in 1896.

The Republicans briefly lost control of state government following the Panic of 1873, when a reform coalition of Democrats, Grangers and Liberal Republicans elected Democrat William Taylor as governor. Immigrant backlash against Republican-supported temperance legislation was also a major factor. In 1874 Republicans backed the weak railroad regulation of the Potter Law, but replaced the law with the even weaker Vance Law once they returned to power the next year.

Civil War veteran Jeremiah Rusk of Viroqua proved a popular Republican governor during his three terms (1882–1889). A farmer, Rusk supported measures that improved the state's agriculture, such as university-run experimental farms. He was later appointed the country's first Secretary of Agriculture by president Benjamin Harrison. In 1886, he issued the "shoot to kill" order to the National Guard in response to widespread May Day strikes in Milwaukee, resulting in the Bay View Tragedy that left seven people dead. Despite the loss of life, Rusk's decision was applauded in state newspapers as well as nationally. Rusk's administration was followed by that of another Republican farmer, William Hoard (1889–1891), who published a widely read journal on dairy farming.

In 1890 the Republicans were swept from state offices again when the party ran afoul of ethnic politics by supporting the Bennett Law, a compulsory school attendance measure that stipulated that all classes must be taught in English. Immigrant groups and supporters of parochial schools condemned the law while Governor Hoard and the Milwaukee Sentinel continued to defend it. Democrats won in a landslide, but the GOP returned to power two years later.

=== The Progressive Era ===
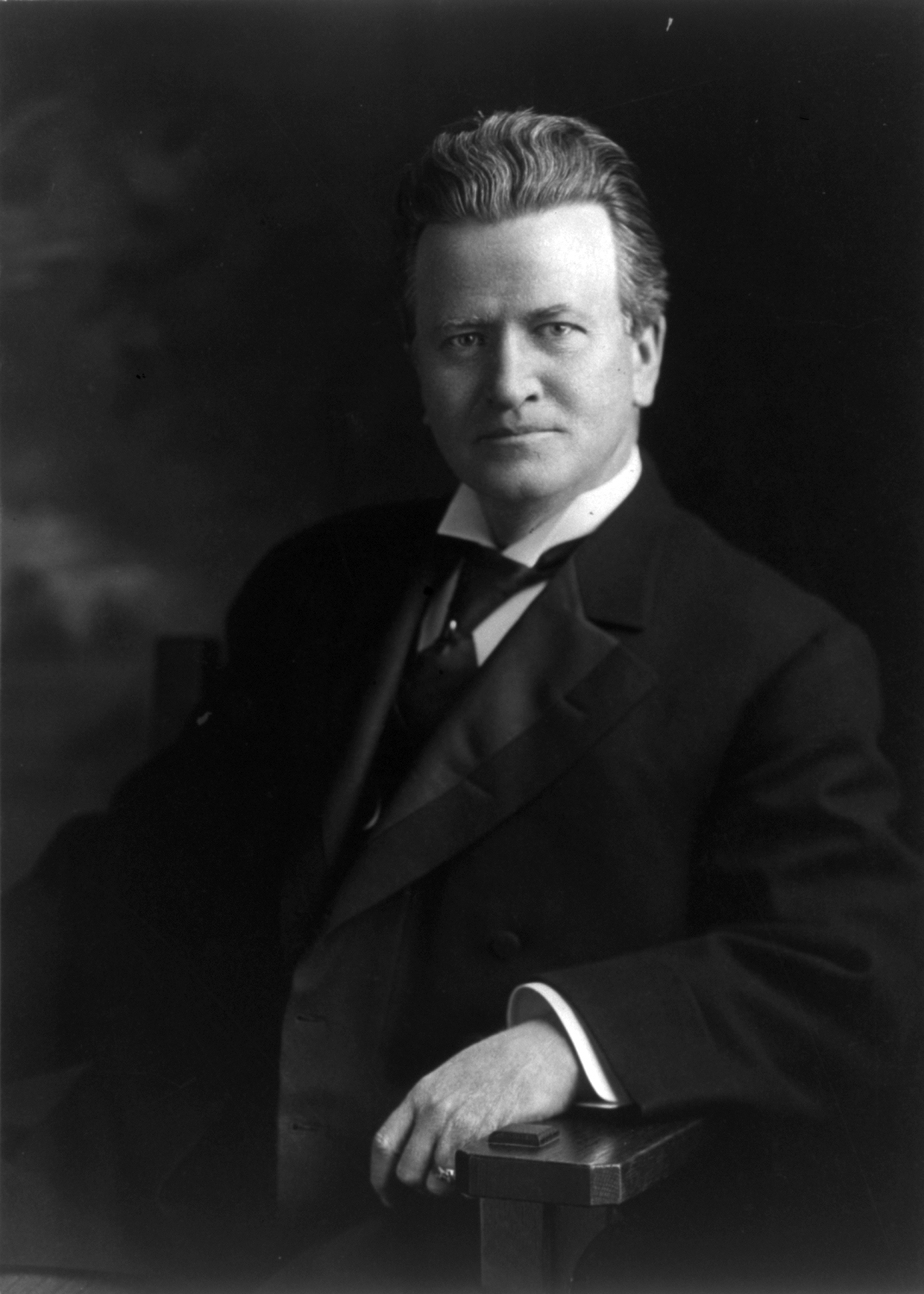
Robert M. La Follette, leader of the progressive faction of the party.

During the 1890s the state Republican party was split into two factions. The stalwart faction in power was led by wealthy men such as Sawyer, Payne, Spooner and Charles F. Pfister (who would purchase the Milwaukee Sentinel in 1900). The other faction (the "halfbreeds") was composed of reform-minded Republicans such as Dunn County's Albert R. Hall and Soldiers Grove's James O. Davidson who saw the powerful railroad and utility monopolies (such as The Milwaukee Electric Railway and Light Company (TMER&L)) cheating their customers and corrupting their politicians.

Following three terms as a stand-pat Republican congressman from Madison, Robert M. La Follette emerged as the leader of an insurgent movement to wrest control of the party from the stalwart machine. La Follette had backed other anti-machine Republicans for governor before first running for the office in 1896. He campaigned on a platform of election reform and corporate accountability while accusing the stalwarts of bribery. After being elected governor on his third attempt in 1900, he spent his three terms fighting for primary elections and taxation of corporations based on the value of property. In 1904 the stalwarts fought bitterly against his second re-election with the use of bribed editors and a rump convention, but La Follette prevailed and saw his reforms passed. The state legislature elected him U.S. senator in 1905.

Succeeding La Follette as governor was James O. Davidson, who supported and signed into law reforms such as state regulation of industries, insurance companies and other businesses. Governor Francis E. McGovern followed with an even more progressive program that resulted in a state income tax, workers compensation, child labor laws and encouragement of cooperatives. Regardless of Davidson and McGovern's successes, La Follette ran his own loyal candidates against them, splitting the state's progressive Republicans and resulting in the 1912 election of the stalwarts' candidate Emanuel Philipp as governor. Despite campaigning on promises to dismantle progressive programs, Philipp proved to be a moderate, leaving nearly all of the reforms intact.

=== World War I ===
As World War I raged in Europe, most Wisconsin Republicans moved cautiously from neutrality to preparedness. One exception was Sen. La Follette, an outspoken opponent of American participation in the war. In February 1917 he led a group of progressive senators in blocking President Woodrow Wilson's bill to arm merchant ships. La Follette's actions made him nationally notorious. After being misquoted in a speech as having no grievances against Germany, he was abandoned by many of his longtime associates and later threatened with expulsion from the Senate. Gov. Philipp also opposed arming merchant ships and conscription, but after war was declared he administered the state's war effort, marshaled state resources and formed councils to conduct the draft, sell Liberty bonds, generate propaganda and stifle dissent.

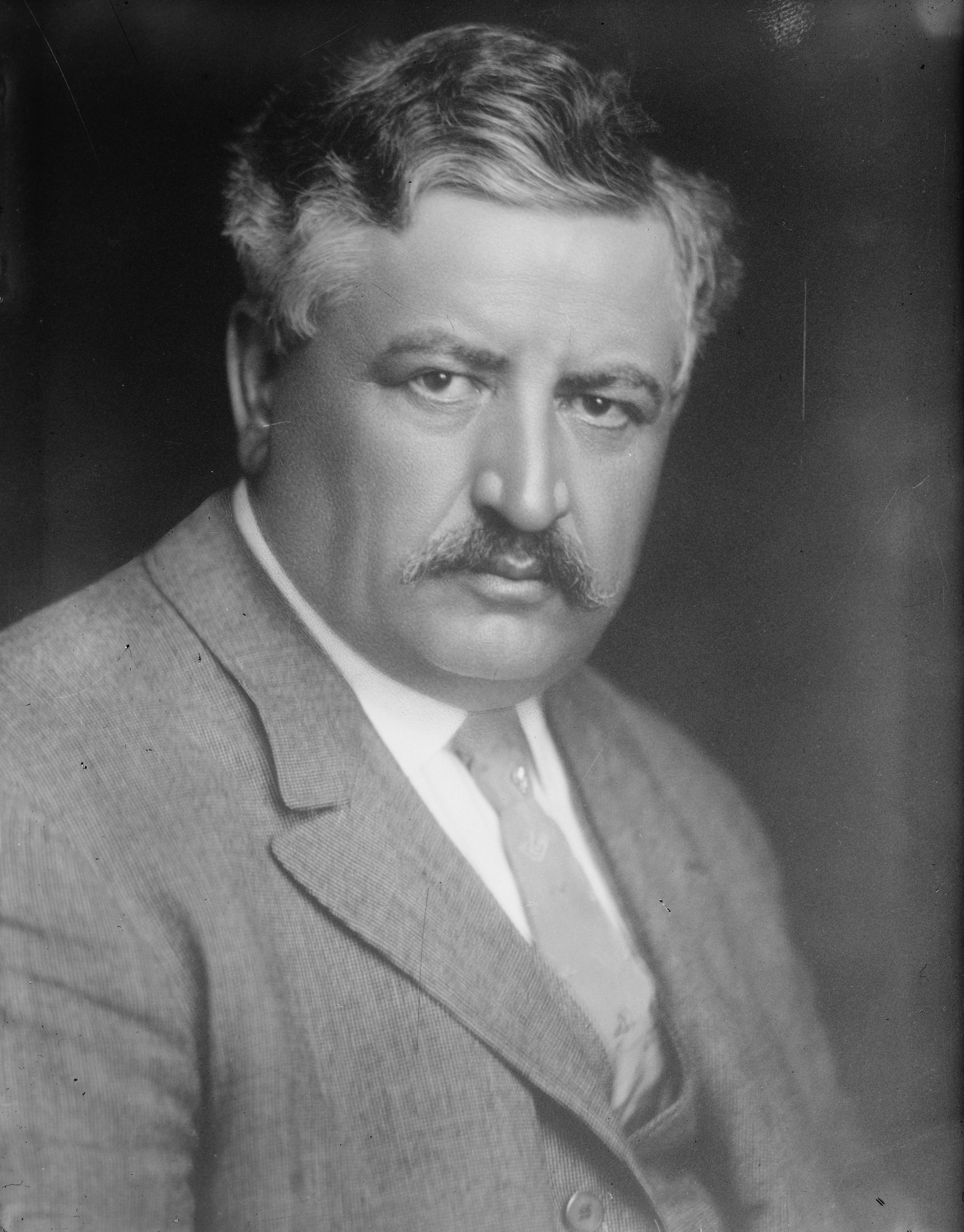
Emanuel L. Philipp was the governor of Wisconsin during the First World War and represented the Conservative faction of the party.

The war shattered the traditional alignments within the state's parties. Many progressives joined the stalwarts in supporting Wisconsin's war measures, while many immigrant voters abandoned Wilson's Democratic Party. Loyalty became a prime issue in political campaigns, to the detriment of farmers and others shortchanged by the war. Even after the Armistice, super-patriots like state senator Roy P. Wilcox of Eau Claire weren't above accusing party figures like Gov. Philipp and Sen. Irvine Lenroot of divided loyalties. To thwart Wilcox's run for governor in 1920, the Philipp and La Follette forces separately supported John Blaine, the former mayor of Boscobel and a La Follette progressive.

=== The 1920s ===
During the 1920s state Republicans racked up a decade of tremendous legislative majorities. For example, in 1925 the Democrats held no seats in the state senate and only one in the assembly, while the Republicans held 92 assembly seats. But with the end of the war, factions within the party began to re-assert themselves, and a second wave of progressives returned to power. La Follette was decisively re-elected senator in 1922, and two years later he ran for president on a Progressive Party ticket against President Calvin Coolidge. He received every sixth vote cast nationally, but only carried Wisconsin. He died in 1925, but the La Follette name and his brand of Republicanism were carried on by his two sons. Robert La Follette, Jr. defeated Wilcox in the special election to fill his father's senate seat, while his younger brother Philip F. La Follette was elected Dane County district attorney.

To fight the progressives, conservative Republicans organized the Republican Voluntary Committee as a political action group to strategize and raise large donations outside the state party. The RVC cited a Wisconsin Manufacturers Association-financed study that concluded that businesses were leaving the state due to high taxes, but the report was refuted by economists that proved manufacturing had grown in the state. The study backfired and Gov. Blaine succeeded in shifting the tax burden from property to income.

With help from the Republican Voluntary Committee the stalwarts returned to the governorship with the 1928 election of Walter J. Kohler of Kohler Company, a plumbing fixture manufacturer who practiced an industrial policy of benevolence towards his workers (including the planned community of Kohler) as a guard against unions. Like President Herbert Hoover, Kohler was stimied by the stock market crash of 1929, and his attempts to mitigate the effects of the Depression were ineffective. Running for re-election in 1930 Kohler was beaten decisively in the Republican primary by Phil La Follette, who led a successful slate of progressive allies to state office and Congress in the general election.

=== Decline of the Progressive faction ===
After the 1930s and 1940s, the influence of the progressive faction began to wane as many eventually left office or joined the Democrats and the conservatives gradually took control. In 1934, Philip La Follette and Robert M. La Follette, Jr. established the Wisconsin Progressive Party which was an alliance between the longstanding "Progressive" faction of the Republican Party of Wisconsin, led by the La Follette family and their political allies, and certain radical farm and labor groups active in Wisconsin at the time. In 1934 Philip to run for re-election as Governor of Wisconsin and Robert ran for re-election to the United States Senate. Both men were successful in their bids, and the party saw a number of other victories as well in the 1934 and 1936 election, notably winning several U.S. House seats and a majority of the Wisconsin State Senate and Wisconsin State Assembly in 1936. Their grip on power was short-lived, however, and they succumbed to a united Democratic and Republican front in 1938 which swept most of them out of office, including Philip. They were further crippled that year by attempting to expand the party to the national level. As the Progressives formed their own party, this allowed conservativism to increasingly dominate the Republican Party. The Progressive Party would continue to have an increasingly diminishing influence at the state level until the mid-1940s when members of the party voted to dissolve the party and Robert M. La Follette Jr was defeated by Joe McCarthy in the Republican primary for senate in 1946.

=== Cold War era ===
Following World War II many progressives were either defeated by or joined the Democratic Party. Conservatives increasingly began to dominate the Republican Party, though many more moderate members still continued to exert influence. This new conservative trend in the party was most famously exemplified by Joe McCarthy, who represented Wisconsin in the U.S. Senate from 1947 until his death in 1957. Initially described as "quiet," McCarthy eventually rose to national prominence over his stanch anti-communist views, and for being a primary instigator of the red scare during the early 1950s. McCarthy's wild and often false attacks against various government officials for being communist, including at one point targeting fellow Republican President Dwight D. Eisenhower, eventually led him to be censured by his colleagues in the Senate in 1954, and also led to the creation of the term McCarthyism. By this point, public opinion throughout the country had generally turned against him.

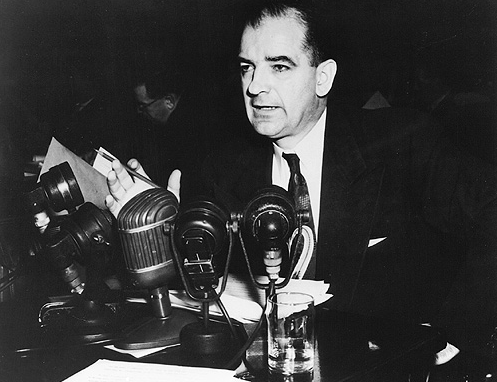
Senator Joseph McCarthy

Back at home, the state Republicans' dominance of Wisconsin politics began to wane during the second half of the 20th century, with the party now regularly alternating and sharing control with the state's Democrats. Several Republican governors were elected during this time, most prominently Walter J. Kohler Jr. and Warren P. Knowles, both of whom were of the more moderate wing of the party. At the federal level, with the exception of U.S. Senate seats following the death of McCarthy, the Republicans continued to hold an edge. Between 1952 and 1972, Wisconsin voted for the Republican candidate in each presidential election except for 1964.

By the 1970s however, especially after the watergate scandal, Republican successes in Wisconsin began to diminish significantly. In 1976, the state voted for Democrat Jimmy Carter to become president, and by the late 1970s, the Republicans had been completely shut out of power at both the state and federal levels of government, with the Democrats controlling all statewide executive offices and holding a supermajority in the Wisconsin state legislature. During this time, more conservative factions of the party started to grow in power, with the moderates becoming increasingly irrelevant. This trend eventually led to the rise of Lee S. Dreyfus, who ran for governor as a Republican in 1978. Dreyfus, a party outsider who had become fearful of a one-party system after a visit to communist China, and ran because he believed Wisconsin was at risk of becoming a one-party state under the Democrats, moved the Republicans in a fiscal conservative direction, echoing the national trend that occurred with the rise of Ronald Reagan. Dreyfus's fiscal conservatism and populist sentiments, while still remaining generally moderate on social issues, would ultimately lead him to win the governorship, ending unified Democratic control of the state. Later in 1980, Wisconsin voted for Reagan in his successful presidential bid, and conservative Robert W. Kasten Jr. unseated three-term incumbent Democrat Gaylord Nelson in the state's election for U.S. Senate.

=== Tommy Thompson, Reagan, and Bush era ===
With a faltering state economy and rising budget deficit, Dreyfus chose not to seek a second term in 1982, and the Republicans ultimately found themselves relegated to the minority once again, with the Democrats winning back the governorship and still maintaining wide majorities in the state legislature. In spite of this trend, Reagan would still manage to carry the state in his 1984 re-election as president, though this would mark the last time until 2016 where a Republican would carry Wisconsin in a presidential bid.

At the state level, by the mid-1980s, the conservative transformation of the Republicans was completed. Subsequently, the party began to break free of its status as a minority party in the state. In 1986, the party's candidate for governor Tommy Thompson successfully unseated one-term incumbent Anthony Earl by a wide margin. Having campaigned on a conservative platform, during his time in office Thompson become most well known for his welfare reform efforts, which would later serve as a national model for the Personal Responsibility and Work Opportunity Act in 1996. Following his initial election, Thompson would go on to win three more elections in the 1990s, each one by double digit margins, and would serve a record 14 years in office before leaving in 2001 to become U.S. Secretary of Health and Human Services. The Republicans also won back control of the state legislature for the first time in over twenty years in the "Republican Revolution" of 1994, giving the party a governing trifecta for the first time since 1970. In spite of these gains however, the party continued to struggle with elections to federal offices, namely elections to the U.S. Senate. Following Republican Robert W. Kasten Jr.'s 1992 defeat in his bid for re-election by Russ Feingold, the party would fail to win another Senate race for nearly two decades.

For most of the 2000s, following the departure of Thompson from the governorship and the later defeat of his lieutenant governor Scott McCallum by Democrat Jim Doyle in the 2002 election, Wisconsin remained in a state of divided government with the Republicans continuing to control the legislature. The new decade also saw the rise of a new generation of Republicans, including conservative Scott Walker, who was first elected as Milwaukee County Executive in 2002. Wisconsin politics in the 2000s was partly dominated by the presidency of George W. Bush. This has the effect of benefitting Republicans early on, however as Bush's approval ratings sank in the latter part of the decade, largely due to his perceived lackluster response to Hurricane Katrina and the increasingly costly Iraq War, Wisconsin voters began to turn on the party at all levels of government. In the 2008 elections, this had the effect of allowing Democrat Barack Obama to carry the state by a landslide margin in the presidential election over Republican John McCain, and shutting Republicans completely out of power in state government for the first time since 1986 (with the exception of the state's Attorney General position, which was still held by Republican J.B. Van Hollen).

=== Scott Walker and the Tea Party ===
The Republican party of Wisconsin and the politics of the state in general during the 2010s were heavily dominated by the rise of stanch conservative Governor Scott Walker, backed by the then adescent Tea Party movement, a right-wing conservative movement that had formed in the late 2000s in response to Obama's election as President of the United States. In 2010, the Republicans, particularly those backed by the Tea Party movement, made sweeping gains in the state. Alongside Walker's victory in the 2010 governor's race, Republicans also won every other statewide seat up for election, including a U.S. Senate seat won by Tea Party-backed Ron Johnson, as well as both chambers of the state's legislature.

Shortly after taking power in 2011, Walker introduced his first budget which he stated was designed to fix the billion dollar budget deficit that the state was facing at the time. Protests soon erupted however over a measure in the budget known as Act 10, which was set to limit collective bargaining rights of public employees in the state. After signing the budget and Act 10 into law, Walker and several other Republicans, including State Senate majority leader Scott Fitzgerald, were faced with recall efforts. This eventually led to a 2012 recall election against Walker, where he defeated his opponent from 2010 in a rematch by a slightly wider margin than the previous time. In the other subsequent recall elections in June 2012, Republicans lost control of the State Senate by a single seat to the Democrats, though they gained back their majority the following November.

During his time in office, Walker signed numerous pieces of landmark (and often controversial) legislation into law, including laws restricting access to abortion, loosening labor regulations, and cutting property taxes. After being re-elected in 2014, Walker also signed a right-to-work law, for which he gained significant national attention. After a brief stint running for president himself in 2015, Walker eventually endorsed Ted Cruz in the 2016 presidential race, in a bid to stop Donald Trump from getting the nomination. Cruz later won the 2016 Wisconsin Republican primary, though Walker later supported Trump after he clinched the party's nomination, and Trump went on to be the first Republican to carry Wisconsin in a presidential election since 1984.

Later in 2018, Walker sought re-election to a third term as governor, however his glamour as a young energetic conservative by this point had largely worn off, and his rising unpopularity due to his policies concerning public education, infrastructure, and a deal his administration made with Taiwanese company Foxconn in 2017 to create jobs in the state in exchange for around $4.5 billion in taxpayer subsidies, made re-election in 2018 far difficult than in his previous races. His increasingly unpopular conservative policies, compounded by the relative unpopularity of Trump in Wisconsin, ultimately resulted in Walker's defeat by Democratic candidate Tony Evers. Republicans also subsequently lost all statewide executive offices, though in spite of this they maintained wide majorities in both chambers of the state legislature despite losing the overall statewide vote, which some people have attributed to gerrymandering that took place following the 2010 elections.

=== Wisconsin Republicans today ===
Following the defeat of Scott Walker, in December 2018, a special legislative session was called by Walker to pass a series of bills to limit the powers of his incoming successor Tony Evers, as well as incoming Democratic State attorney general Josh Kaul who had defeated incumbent Republican Brad Schimel. The bills were widely denounced by Democrats and others as a "power grab." Walker and other Republicans meanwhile argued that the bills were necessary "checks on power" and that they did not actually strip any real powers from the executive. Lawsuits were filed by Evers and various labor unions almost immediately after Walker signed the bills into law.

On October 22, 2020, the party noticed suspicious activity in its account used for Donald Trump's reelection campaign. It soon appeared that hackers had altered invoices so that, when the party paid its expenses, $2.3 million was paid to the hackers rather than to the actual vendors to whom it was owed.

During the 2022 Wisconsin elections, the Republicans gained a U.S. House seat, with Derrick Van Orden replacing Ron Kind, who did not run for re-election, and U.S. Senator Ron Johnson was re-elected to a third term, defeating Lieutenant Governor Mandela Barnes by 26,718 votes. Additionally, Republicans gained three seats in the State Assembly and one seat in the State Senate. However, Republicans lost elections for all statewide executive offices, with the exception of John Leiber who was elected State Treasurer by a slim 38,604 votes.

Currently the Republican Party of Wisconsin controls one of two U.S. Senate seats and six of eight U.S. House seats, as well as majorities in both houses of the state legislature. The party holds one statewide executive office, State Treasurer.

The largest youth outreach arm of the Republican Party of Wisconsin is the Wisconsin College Republicans, a member group of the College Republicans of America (CRA). The Wisconsin College Republicans have over twenty chapters around the state, with major chapters at University of Wisconsin–Madison, Marquette University, University of Wisconsin–Platteville, and University of Wisconsin–Stout. The current Chairman of the Wisconsin College Republicans is William Blathras, who is serving in his second term as Chair.

== Conventions ==
=== 2009 Republican Party of Wisconsin Convention ===
The 2009 party convention was held in La Crosse on May 1, with the highlight being straw polls for the upcoming 2010 gubernatorial and senatorial elections.

=== 2010 Republican Party of Wisconsin Convention ===
The 2010 party convention was held May 21–23 in Milwaukee. The convention was the largest in RPW history with over 1500 delegates registering and participating in the convention. The convention endorsed Milwaukee County Executive Scott Walker for Governor with 91% of the vote.

=== 2011 Republican Party of Wisconsin Convention ===
The 2011 RPW convention was held May 20–22 in Wisconsin Dells. The convention was held at Glacier Canyon Lodge at the Wilderness.

=== 2012 Republican Party of Wisconsin Convention ===
The 2012 RPW Convention was held May 11–13 at the KI Convention Center in downtown Green Bay. The convention will begin the final push for the Republican defense of the 2012 Recall Election of Governor Scott Walker.

== Current elected officials ==
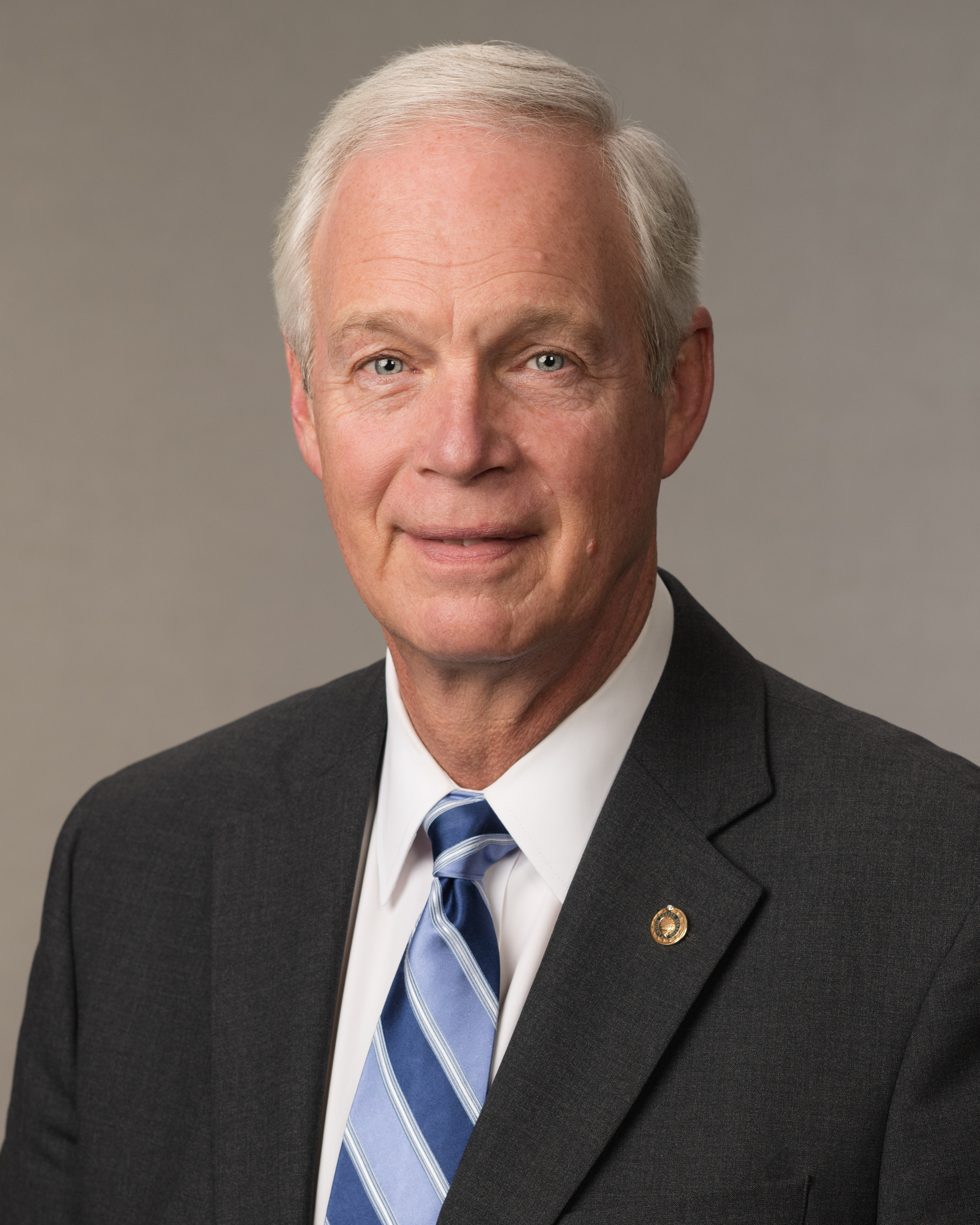
Senior Senator Johnson

The Wisconsin Republican Party controls the statewide office of Treasurer and holds a majority in both the Wisconsin Senate and Wisconsin State Assembly. Republicans also hold one of the state's U.S. Senate seats and six of the state's 8 U.S. House of Representatives seats.

=== Members of Congress ===
==== United States Senate ====
- Senator: Ron Johnson

==== U.S. House of Representatives ====
District	Member	Photo
1st	Bryan Steil	
3rd	Derrick Van Orden	
5th	Scott Fitzgerald (politician)	
6th	Glenn Grothman	
7th	Tom Tiffany	
7th	Michael Alfonso (elect)	
8th	Tony Wied	

=== Statewide offices ===
- State Treasurer John S. Leiber

=== Legislative leadership ===
- President of the Senate: Mary Felzkowski
  - Senate Republican Leader: Devin LeMahieu
- Speaker of the Assembly: Robin Vos
  - Assembly Majority Leader: Tyler August

== See also ==
- Democratic Party of Wisconsin
- Politics of Wisconsin
- History of the United States Republican Party
