= Dale McKenna =

American politician

Dale McKenna (May 7, 1937 – March 4, 2009) was an American politician who served in the Wisconsin State Senate.

== Personal life ==
McKenna was born in Reeseville, Wisconsin. He graduated from St. Lawrence Seminary High School in Mount Calvary, Wisconsin, before graduating from St. Norbert College and the University of Wisconsin Law School and becoming a lawyer. From 1959 to 1962, he served in the United States Army.

== Political career ==
McKenna was first elected to the Senate in a special election in 1969. In 1978, he was a candidate in the Democratic primary for Lieutenant Governor of Wisconsin and run on the gubernatorial ticket with incumbent Governor Martin J. Schreiber. He lost to Doug La Follette. Schreiber and La Follette would lose in the general election to the Republican ticket made up of Lee S. Dreyfus and Russell Olson. McKenna died on March 4, 2009.
