= James Flynn (politician) =

American politician, 40th Lieutenant Governor of Wisconsin

Jim Flynn
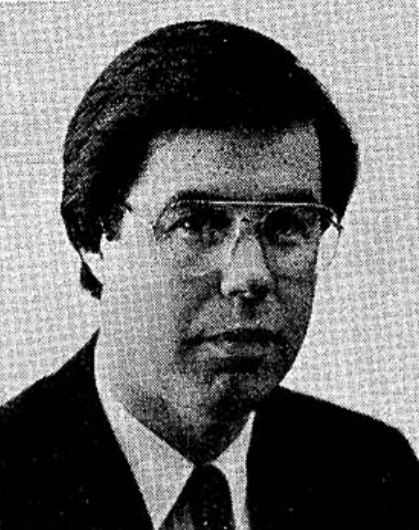

40th Lieutenant Governor of Wisconsin
- In office January 3, 1983 – January 5, 1987
- Governor: Tony Earl
- Preceded by: Russell Olson
- Succeeded by: Scott McCallum

Secretary of the Wisconsin Department of Development
- In office January 3, 1983 – January 5, 1987
- Governor: Tony Earl
- Preceded by: Chandler L. McKelvey
- Succeeded by: Bruno J. Mauer

Member of the Wisconsin Senate from the 8th district
- In office January 1, 1973 – January 3, 1983
- Preceded by: Allen Busby
- Succeeded by: Joseph Czarnezki

Personal details
- Born: September 25, 1944
- Party: Democratic
- Spouse: Jennifer
- Children: 2
- Education: Marquette University (B.A.); Marquette Law School (J.D.)
- Profession: lawyer, politician

James T. Flynn (born September 25, 1944) is an American lawyer and retired politician. He was the 40th Lieutenant Governor of Wisconsin, serving from 1983 to 1987. Prior to that, he served ten years in the Wisconsin State Senate.

== Biography ==
Flynn graduated from Pius XI High School in Milwaukee. He earned a B.A. degree from Marquette University in 1970 and a J.D. degree from Marquette University Law School in 1973. He worked as a house painter and subsequently as a teacher, serving at nearby St. Rose of Lima School in Milwaukee. Flynn was elected to the Wisconsin State Senate as a Democrat in 1972, and was re-elected in 1976 and 1980.

He won the Democratic primary for Lieutenant Governor in September 1982 and went on to win election alongside Democratic gubernatorial candidate Tony Earl. He held office from 1983 until 1987; In January 1983, he was appointed and simultaneously served as the Secretary of the Wisconsin Department of Development. He did not run for re-election in 1986. After he left office, he retired from politics and took a job as a project development executive with American Medical Buildings.

Flynn ran for a judgeship on the Wisconsin Circuit Court in Milwaukee County in 1999, but was defeated by incumbent Judge John E. McCormick.

In 2003, he was appointed to the Wisconsin Labor and Industry Review Commission by Governor Jim Doyle, and he was reappointed as chairman in 2005. His term expired in 2011.

== Electoral history ==
=== Wisconsin Lieutenant Governor (1982) ===
Wisconsin Lieutenant Gubernatorial Election, 1982
Party	Candidate	Votes	%	±%
General Election, September 14, 1982
Republican	Russell Olson (incumbent)	276,496	36.77%	
Democratic	James T. Flynn	259,638	34.52%	
Democratic	Wayne P. Frank	150,592	20.02%	
Democratic	Jack H. Gleason	62,022	8.25%	
Libertarian	Gerald Shidell	1,766	0.23%	
Constitution	Diana K. Simonson	1,526	0.20%	
Total votes		'752,040'	'100.0%'	
Gubernatorial General Election, November 2, 1982
Democratic	Tony Earl James T. Flynn	896,872	56.75%	+11.86%
Republican	Terry Kohler Russell Olson (incumbent)	662,738	41.94%	−12.43%
Libertarian	Larry Smiley Gerald Shidell	9,734	0.62%	
Constitution	James P. Wickstrom Diana K. Simonson	7,721	0.49%	+0.07%
Independent	Peter Seidman Margo Storsteen	3,025	0.19%	
	Scattering	254	0.02%	
Total votes		'1,580,344'	'100.0%'	+5.29%
Democratic gain from Republican				

=== Wisconsin Circuit Court (1999) ===
Wisconsin Circuit Court, Milwaukee Circuit, Branch 19 Election, 1999
Party	Candidate	Votes	%	±%
General Election, April 6, 1999
Nonpartisan	John E. McCormick (incumbent)	49,600	55.86%	
Nonpartisan	James Flynn	39,195	44.14%	
Total votes		'88,795'	'100.0%'	-10.86%

Party political offices
Preceded by Doug La Follette	Democratic nominee for Lieutenant Governor of Wisconsin; 1982	Succeeded by Sharon Metz
Wisconsin Senate
Preceded by Allen Busby	Member of the Wisconsin Senate from the 8th district 1973 – 1983	Succeeded by Joseph Czarnezki
Political offices
Preceded by Russell Olson	Lieutenant Governor of Wisconsin; 1983 – 1987	Succeeded by Scott McCallum
