= 1978 Wisconsin gubernatorial election =

- November 7, 1978
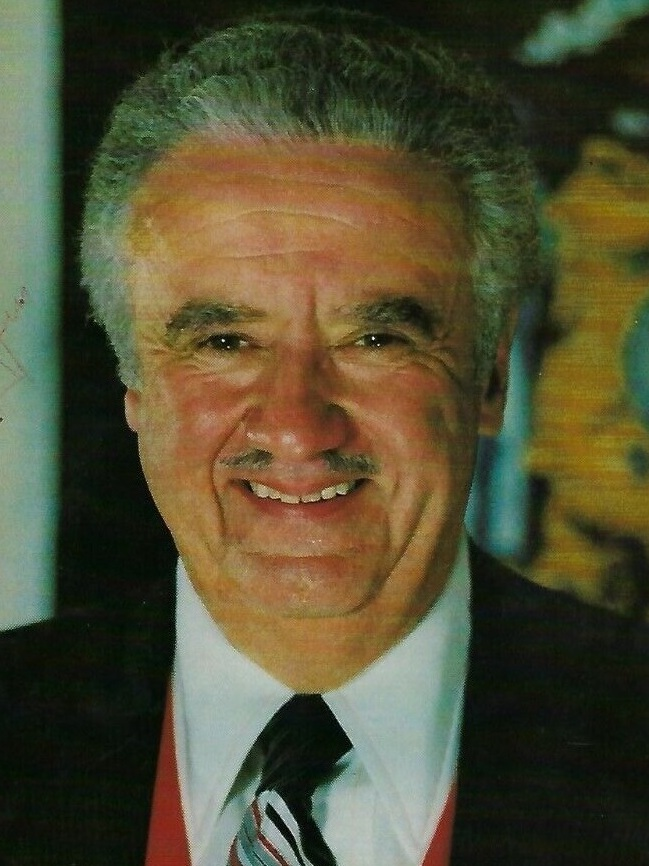

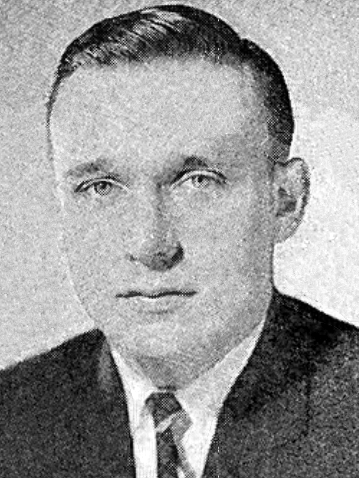
Nominee	Lee S. Dreyfus	Martin J. Schreiber
Party	Republican	Democratic
Running mate	Russell A. Olson	Douglas J. La Follette
Popular vote	816,056	673,813
Percentage	54.37%	44.89%
- County results Dreyfus: 50–60% 60–70% Schreiber: 40–50% 50–60% 60–70% 70–80%
Governor before election
Martin J. Schreiber
Democratic
Elected Governor
Lee S. Dreyfus
Republican

The 1978 Wisconsin gubernatorial election was held on November 7, 1978. Republican Lee S. Dreyfus won the election with 54% of the vote, winning his first term as Governor of Wisconsin and defeating incumbent Democrat Martin J. Schreiber. Bob Kasten unsuccessfully sought the Republican nomination.

As of 2024, this is the last occasion that Florence County has voted Democratic in a gubernatorial election.

The primary election was held on September 12, 1978. Nominees for Governor and Lieutenant Governor were selected in separate primaries before running on a joint ticket in the general election.

== Democratic party ==
=== Governor ===
==== Candidates ====
===== Nominee =====
- Martin J. Schreiber, incumbent governor

===== Eliminated in primary =====
- David Carley, nominee for lieutenant governor in 1962
- Edmond Hou-Seye, American party nominee for United States Senate in 1970

==== Results ====
Democratic gubernatorial primary results
Party	Candidate	Votes	%
Democratic	Martin J. Schreiber (incumbent)	217,572	60.44%
Democratic	David Carley	132,901	36.92%
Democratic	Edmond Hou-Seye	9,487	2.64%
Total votes		359,960	100.00%

=== Lieutenant Governor ===
==== Candidates ====
===== Nominee =====
- Doug La Follette, Secretary of State of Wisconsin

===== Eliminated in primary =====
- Robert A. Anderson
- Dale T. McKenna, State senator from the 13th district
- Paul Offner, State senator from the 32nd district
- Harout Sanasarian, former state representative
- Charles E. Smith
- Monroe Swan, State senator from the 6th district

==== Results ====
Democratic lieutenant gubernatorial primary results
Party	Candidate	Votes	%
Democratic	Douglas J. La Follette	151,366	44.78%
Democratic	Dale T. McKenna	47,257	13.98%
Democratic	Harout Sanasarian	40,268	11.91%
Democratic	Paul Offner	40,008	11.84%
Democratic	Robert A. Anderson	21,230	6.28%
Democratic	Charles E. Smith	19,504	5.77%
Democratic	Monroe Swan	18,392	5.44%
Total votes		338,025	100.00%

== Republican party ==
=== Governor ===
==== Candidates ====
===== Nominee =====
- Lee S. Dreyfus, Chancellor of University of Wisconsin-Stevens Point

===== Eliminated in primary =====
- Robert W. Kasten, member of United States House of Representatives from the 9th district

===== Declined =====
- Stanley York, former state representative from the Buffalo–Pepin–Pierce Assembly district (1967–1970)

==== Results ====
Republican gubernatorial primary results
Party	Candidate	Votes	%
Republican	Lee S. Dreyfus	197,279	57.91%
Republican	Robert W. Kasten	143,361	42.09%
Total votes		340,640	100.00%

=== Lieutenant Governor ===
==== Candidates ====
===== Nominee =====
- Russell A. Olson, member of Wisconsin State Assembly

===== Eliminated in primary =====
- La Verne Ausman, member of Wisconsin State Assembly

==== Results ====
Republican lieutenant gubernatorial primary results
Party	Candidate	Votes	%
Republican	Russell A. Olson	185,332	63.84%
Republican	La Verne Ausman	104,986	36.16%
Total votes		290,318	100.00%

== Conservative party ==
=== Governor ===
==== Candidates ====
- Eugene R. Zimmerman, American party nominee for Secretary of State in 1974

==== Results ====
Conservative gubernatorial primary results
Party	Candidate	Votes	%
Conservative	Eugene R. Zimmerman	1,213	100.00%
Total votes		1,213	100.00%

=== Lieutenant Governor ===
==== Candidates ====
- George Reed, American party nominee for Secretary of State in 1970

==== Results ====
Conservative lieutenant gubernatorial primary results
Party	Candidate	Votes	%
Conservative	George Reed	964	100.00%
Total votes		964	100.00%

== Independent nominations ==
=== Candidates ===
- John C. Doherty & Marion A. Doherty
- Adrienne Kaplan & William Breihan
- Henry A. Ochsner & Robert E. Nordlander

=== Results ===
Independent primary results
Party	Candidate	Votes	%
Independent	Doherty & Doherty	683	51.78%
Independent	Kaplan & Breihan	383	29.04%
Independent	Ochser & Nordlander	253	19.18%
Total votes		1,319	100.00%

== General election ==
=== Candidates ===
- Martin J. Schreiber & Douglas J. La Follette, Democrat
- Lee S. Dreyfus & Russell A. Olson, Republican
- Eugene R. Zimmerman & George Reed, Conservative
- John C. Doherty & Marion A. Doherty, Independent
- Adrienne Kaplan & William Breihan, Independent
- Henry A. Ochsner & Robert E. Nordlander, Independent

=== Results ===
1978 Wisconsin gubernatorial election
Party	Candidate	Votes	%	±%
Republican	Lee S. Dreyfus	816,056	54.37%	+12.30%
Democratic	Martin J. Schreiber (incumbent)	673,813	44.89%	−8.29%
Conservative	Eugene R. Zimmerman	6,355	0.42%	
Independent	John C. Doherty	2,183	0.15%	
Independent	Adrienne Kaplan	1,548	0.10%	
Independent	Henry A. Ochsner	849	0.06%	
	Scattering	192	0.01%	
Majority		142,243	9.48%	
Total votes		1,500,996	100.00%	
Republican gain from Democratic		Swing	+20.60%	

=== Results by county ===
Dreyfus was the first Republican since Walter J. Kohler Jr. in 1952 to win Forest County, Portage County, and Rusk County. St. Croix County backed the losing candidate for the first time since 1892, breaking a bellwether streak of 40 consecutive gubernatorial elections. Barron County, Buffalo County, Pepin County, and Washburn County would not vote for the losing candidate again until 2018.

County	Lee S. Dreyfus Republican		Martin J. Schreiber Democratic		All Others Various		Margin		Total votes cast
County	#	%	#	%	#	%	#	%	Total votes cast
Adams	2,567	56.50%	1,941	42.73%	35	0.77%	626	13.78%	4,543
Ashland	2,641	45.60%	3,108	53.66%	43	0.74%	-467	-8.06%	5,792
Barron	4,868	49.57%	4,901	49.91%	51	0.52%	-33	-0.34%	9,820
Bayfield	2,354	44.42%	2,889	54.52%	56	1.06%	-535	-10.10%	5,299
Brown	31,610	57.19%	23,146	41.88%	514	0.93%	8,464	15.31%	55,270
Buffalo	1,980	45.65%	2,329	53.70%	28	0.65%	-349	-8.05%	4,337
Burnett	1,931	41.33%	2,664	57.02%	77	1.65%	-733	-15.69%	4,672
Calumet	5,593	57.51%	4,091	42.07%	41	0.42%	1,502	15.44%	9,725
Chippewa	7,624	55.97%	5,880	43.17%	118	0.87%	1,744	12.80%	13,622
Clark	6,123	56.80%	4,583	42.52%	73	0.68%	1,540	14.29%	10,779
Columbia	8,377	62.09%	5,063	37.53%	52	0.39%	3,314	24.56%	13,492
Crawford	2,332	52.63%	2,071	46.74%	28	0.63%	261	5.89%	4,431
Dane	56,631	50.24%	54,916	48.72%	1,166	1.03%	1,715	1.52%	112,713
Dodge	14,280	61.89%	8,656	37.51%	138	0.60%	5,624	24.37%	23,074
Door	5,226	59.50%	3,520	40.08%	37	0.42%	1,706	19.42%	8,783
Douglas	5,504	38.94%	8,494	60.10%	135	0.96%	-2,990	-21.16%	14,133
Dunn	4,317	46.40%	4,824	51.85%	163	1.75%	-507	-5.45%	9,304
Eau Claire	12,063	52.16%	10,898	47.13%	164	0.71%	1,165	5.04%	23,125
Florence	692	48.56%	722	50.67%	11	0.77%	-30	-2.11%	1,425
Fond du Lac	16,305	57.31%	11,848	41.64%	300	1.05%	4,457	15.66%	28,453
Forest	1,653	52.08%	1,493	47.04%	28	0.88%	160	5.04%	3,174
Grant	8,963	59.00%	6,134	40.38%	94	0.62%	2,829	18.62%	15,191
Green	5,211	59.63%	3,493	39.97%	35	0.40%	1,718	19.66%	8,739
Green Lake	4,056	69.69%	1,737	29.85%	27	0.46%	2,319	39.85%	5,820
Iowa	3,269	56.13%	2,519	43.25%	36	0.62%	750	12.88%	5,824
Iron	1,296	47.81%	1,384	51.05%	31	1.14%	-88	-3.25%	2,711
Jackson	3,118	58.71%	2,157	40.61%	36	0.68%	961	18.09%	5,311
Jefferson	12,255	58.59%	8,519	40.73%	141	0.67%	3,736	17.86%	20,915
Juneau	4,356	60.91%	2,743	38.36%	52	0.73%	1,613	22.56%	7,151
Kenosha	13,518	41.36%	18,976	58.06%	188	0.58%	-5,458	-16.70%	32,682
Kewaunee	3,446	55.86%	2,690	43.61%	33	0.53%	756	12.25%	6,169
La Crosse	15,954	56.52%	12,053	42.70%	218	0.77%	3,901	13.82%	28,225
Lafayette	3,370	56.19%	2,596	43.29%	31	0.52%	774	12.91%	5,997
Langlade	5,213	66.01%	2,624	33.23%	60	0.76%	2,589	32.78%	7,897
Lincoln	5,838	65.77%	2,975	33.52%	63	0.71%	2,863	32.26%	8,876
Manitowoc	13,130	48.06%	13,898	50.87%	294	1.08%	-768	-2.81%	27,322
Marathon	24,536	64.67%	12,973	34.19%	433	1.14%	11,563	30.48%	37,942
Marinette	7,376	54.62%	6,030	44.65%	98	0.73%	1,346	9.97%	13,504
Marquette	2,422	61.36%	1,495	37.88%	30	0.76%	927	23.49%	3,947
Menominee	201	27.99%	515	71.73%	2	0.28%	-314	-43.73%	718
Milwaukee	145,363	45.94%	168,854	53.36%	2,222	0.70%	-23,491	-7.42%	316,439
Monroe	5,868	65.35%	3,061	34.09%	50	0.56%	2,807	31.26%	8,979
Oconto	5,149	59.12%	3,497	40.15%	63	0.72%	1,652	18.97%	8,709
Oneida	7,818	67.98%	3,632	31.58%	50	0.43%	4,186	36.40%	11,500
Outagamie	23,544	58.89%	16,030	40.09%	409	1.02%	7,514	18.79%	39,983
Ozaukee	17,145	67.50%	8,160	32.12%	96	0.38%	8,985	35.37%	25,401
Pepin	1,016	37.81%	1,647	61.30%	24	0.89%	-631	-23.48%	2,687
Pierce	3,460	44.25%	4,295	54.92%	65	0.83%	-835	-10.68%	7,820
Polk	3,950	43.66%	5,027	55.57%	70	0.77%	-1,077	-11.90%	9,047
Portage	12,722	60.18%	8,272	39.13%	146	0.69%	4,450	21.05%	21,140
Price	3,740	64.41%	2,027	34.91%	40	0.69%	1,713	29.50%	5,807
Racine	26,744	51.62%	24,734	47.74%	334	0.64%	2,010	3.88%	51,812
Richland	3,712	60.97%	2,340	38.44%	36	0.59%	1,372	22.54%	6,088
Rock	18,834	51.24%	17,647	48.01%	273	0.74%	1,187	3.23%	36,754
Rusk	2,517	52.13%	2,269	47.00%	42	0.87%	248	5.14%	4,828
Sauk	7,867	60.46%	5,063	38.91%	82	0.63%	2,804	21.55%	13,012
Sawyer	2,442	62.76%	1,434	36.85%	15	0.39%	1,008	25.91%	3,891
Shawano	7,145	63.31%	4,097	36.30%	44	0.39%	3,048	27.01%	11,286
Sheboygan	18,936	53.30%	16,355	46.04%	235	0.66%	2,581	7.27%	35,526
St. Croix	4,602	45.19%	5,515	54.16%	66	0.65%	-913	-8.97%	10,183
Taylor	3,391	58.62%	2,338	40.41%	56	0.97%	1,053	18.20%	5,785
Trempealeau	4,108	53.14%	3,595	46.51%	27	0.35%	513	6.64%	7,730
Vernon	4,538	59.53%	3,048	39.98%	37	0.49%	1,490	19.55%	7,623
Vilas	4,619	67.54%	2,190	32.02%	30	0.44%	2,429	35.52%	6,839
Walworth	12,808	63.12%	7,386	36.40%	98	0.48%	5,422	26.72%	20,292
Washburn	2,306	48.06%	2,447	51.00%	45	0.94%	-141	-2.94%	4,798
Washington	15,645	60.82%	9,951	38.69%	127	0.49%	5,694	22.14%	25,723
Waukesha	62,062	65.53%	32,138	33.93%	509	0.54%	29,924	31.60%	94,709
Waupaca	9,096	67.75%	4,273	31.83%	57	0.42%	4,823	35.92%	13,426
Waushara	3,791	68.39%	1,729	31.19%	23	0.41%	2,062	37.20%	5,543
Winnebago	24,874	57.24%	18,137	41.74%	441	1.01%	6,737	15.50%	43,452
Wood	14,045	60.34%	9,077	39.00%	155	0.67%	4,968	21.34%	23,277
Total	816,056	54.37%	673,813	44.89%	11,127	0.74%	142,243	9.48%	1,500,996

==== Counties that flipped from Democratic to Republican ====
- Brown
- Calumet
- Chippewa
- Clark
- Crawford
- Dane
- Eau Claire
- Forest
- Langlade
- Lincoln
- Marathon
- Marinette
- Outagamie
- Ozaukee
- Portage
- Price
- Racine
- Rock
- Rusk
- Sawyer
- Sheboygan
- Taylor
- Trempealeau
- Washington
- Waukesha
- Wood
