= Windway =

Historic house in Wisconsin, United States

- U.S. National Register of Historic Places
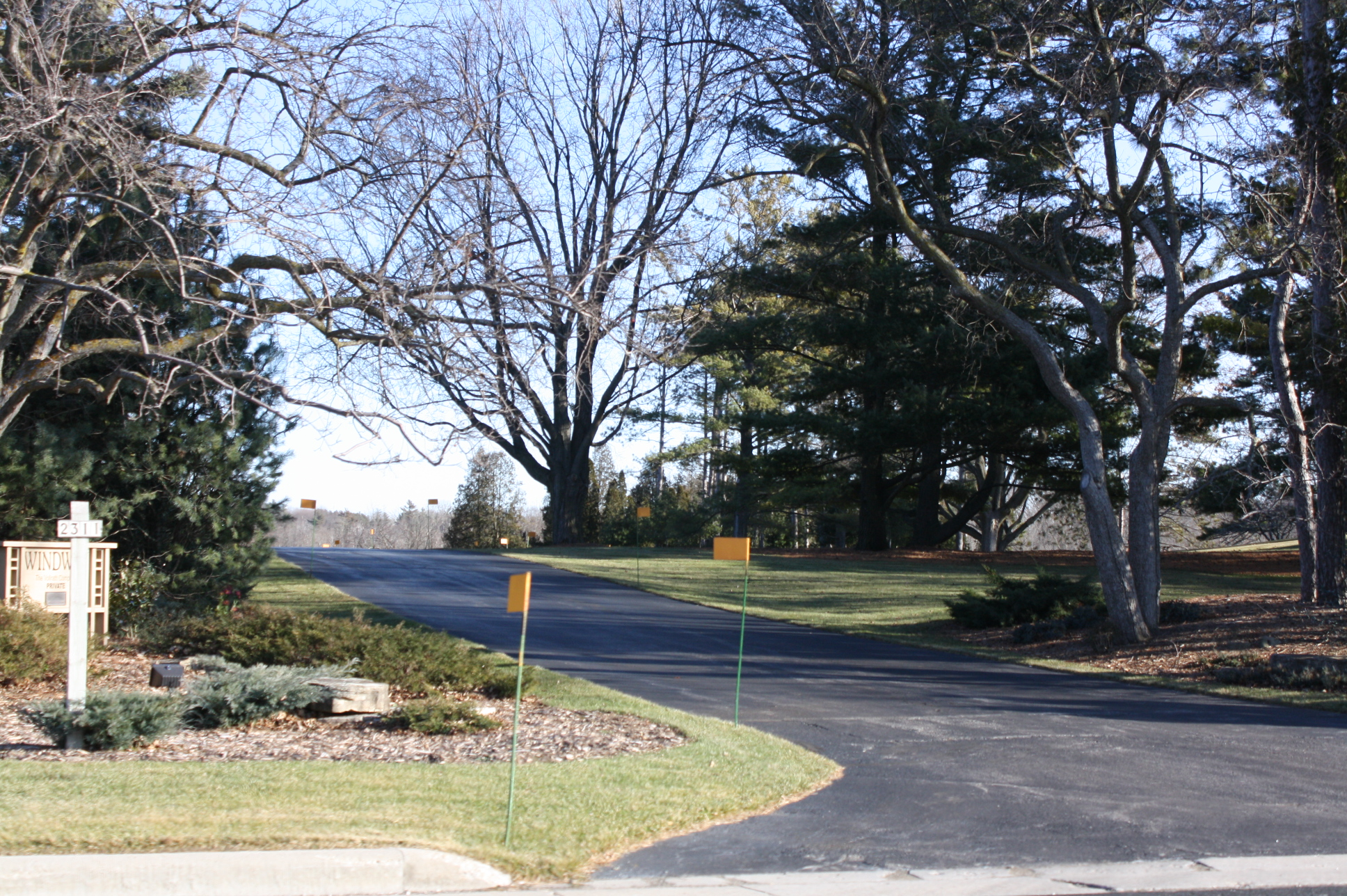
- Windway Estate Entrance

- Location within Wisconsin
- Location: 2311 County Road Y, Sheboygan, Wisconsin
- Coordinates: 43°46′10″N 87°46′40″W
- Built: 1937–1938
- Architect: William Deknatel
- NRHP reference No.: 88001149

Windway is a historic residential property located north of Kohler, Wisconsin. It was built in 1937–1938 by Walter J. Kohler Jr., future governor of Wisconsin and an executive of the Kohler Company.

== History ==
Kohler commissioned architect William Deknatel, who had been an apprentice to Frank Lloyd Wright in the early 1930s, to design the house.

The property was added to the National Register of Historic Places in 1988.

The home is currently owned by Windway Capital Corporation and is used as a residence for artists participating in the John Michael Kohler Arts Center residency program. Windway Capital Corporation is a holding company created by Kohler's son, Terry Kohler, that wholly owns The Vollrath Company, North Sails, Southern Spars and Edgewater Power Boats.

== Architecture ==
The house is an example of International Style of architecture. The house was designed to accommodate Mr. Kohler, his first wife Marie Celeste, their three children, and three servants.

The house is two levels roughly equal in area but with different, overlapping footprints. The first level is roughly T-shaped with the main section running east–west with a guest room, study, play room, and dining room. The kitchen and laundry rooms extend to the north and the living room extends to the south. The garage is also on the first level but is separated from the main house with a drive-through from the driveway to the court.

The second level is L-shaped in plan with the one leg extending north over the driveway and above the garage and the other leg running to the east. The servants rooms were above the garage. One of the children's bedrooms was above the drive-through with the remaining two children's bedrooms located east–west in the south leg. The master bedroom suite was at the east end of the second floor. The second floor did not extend over the kitchen area or over the living room with a roof deck over the living room.

=== Construction ===
The house has a steel and concrete framework which supports the wood roof and floor decks. There are concrete-encased steel beams exposed above the roofline. One runs east–west above the second floor, two are above the section of the second floor that is above the drive-through, two run north–south above the first floor living room extension, and there are two each above the dining room and kitchen areas of the first floor. The exterior brick walls are primarily a veneer over the concrete except the north wall which is a load bearing masonry wall. The suspended roof construction allows a level interior ceiling and full height windows.

=== Exterior ===
All the wood on the exterior was originally tidewater red cypress. The brick is a "tan" colonial that varies in color from tan to a reddish-brown and was laid with a recessed header row. The original roof was a level tar and gravel construction designed to hold 2 inches of water to help with summer cooling. Two small raised pools are located at the south end of the living room and on the east side of the dining room.

=== Interior ===
The ceiling and most walls are sand-floated plaster. The chimney and other interior masonry used the same "tan" brick as the exterior. Wood in the main rooms on the first floor were red birch with white birch used in the bedrooms. The floors were primarily white maple except in the hallways which were originally concrete covered in linoleum. Some minor remodeling has occurred. The stairways and floors on the second level are currently carpeted and some of the rooms have been re-purposed to accommodate its use as an artists' residency.

== Site and Landscape ==
The house was placed on the edge of a bluff which drops about 40 feet to the east. To the west, a rise shelters the house so it is not visible from the road. The driveway rises gently from the road and then drops to pass through the first level and court area and then form a full loop back to the top of the hill. The landscape was kept very simple with open lawn areas surrounding the house and with remainder of the parcel originally a mixture of pasture and woodland, but now mostly wooded. A number of large mature trees sit close to the house and punctuate the lawn areas. The lawn area around the first floor is fairly level to south and west. An outdoor patio area has been added in the southwest corner. The ground to east of the house drops off rather steeply and the area closest to the house is terraced. The Pigeon River meanders through the 52 acre property, entering in the southwest corner, flowing roughly along the south border then turning north to bisect the property. At its closest point it passes within about 200 feet of the house.

== Residents/Ownership ==
Kohler built the home with his first wife, Marie Celeste Holden. When the home was completed in the spring of 1938, Kohler and Holden had two children, son Terry Kohler and daughter Charlotte Nicolette (Niki) Kohler. The children would have been very young since Terry was born in May 1934 and Niki in March 1936. Kohler and Holden were divorced in 1946, the same year that Jacquelin (Jackie) Holden, Celeste's daughter from her first marriage, began living at Windway at the age of 22. Jackie had spent most of her teenage years in boarding school in Connecticut. Despite Kohler being her former step-dad after the divorce, Jackie apparently had an affinity for Kohler and later in life after her second divorce referred to herself as Jackie Kohler despite never having been adopted by him. Kohler's second wife, Charlotte Martha Wiley, moved in with Kohler at Windway after they were married in November 1947. Soon after Wiley ordered all of Jackie's belongings to be placed on the driveway, effectively kicking her out of Windway.

Niki lived in the home until 1950 when she was sent to live at Woods School in Langhorne, Pennsylvania after having a mental disability diagnosis. Terry left Windway in 1950 for prep school but lived there again in 1954 before joining the United States Air Force in 1955. Kohler lived in the home until his death in 1976.

In 1958, Kohler's brother Robert E. Kohler, Sr., commissioned Deknatel to build a 7,000 square foot home named Thornhill northeast of Windway on an adjacement property that also bordered the Pigeon River. By 1988, even though Wiley was still living in Windway, the ownership had passed to Vollrath Company. After Robert's death in 1990, Wiley bought Thornhill and moved into that home until she died in 1995.

== Gallery ==
Aerial view of house shortly after construction

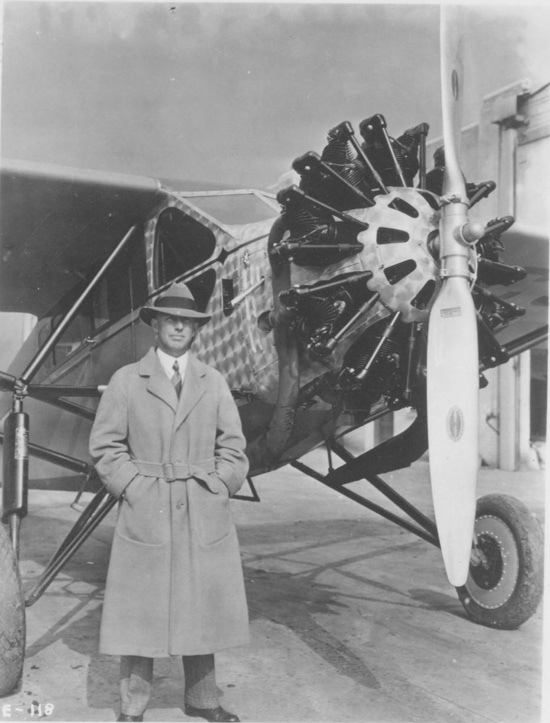
Walter Kohler, Jr.
