= 1982 Wisconsin gubernatorial election =

- November 2, 1982
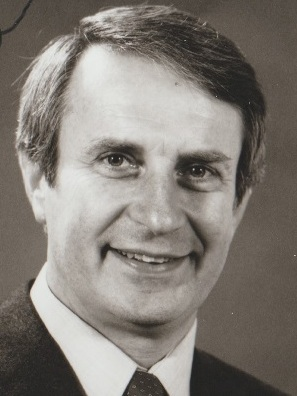

Nominee	Anthony S. Earl	Terry J. Kohler
Party	Democratic	Republican
Running mate	James T. Flynn	Russell A. Olson
Popular vote	896,872	662,738
Percentage	56.76%	41.94%
- County results Earl: 40–50% 50–60% 60–70% 70–80% Kohler: 40–50% 50–60% 60–70%
Governor before election
Lee S. Dreyfus
Republican
Elected Governor
Anthony S. Earl
Democratic

The 1982 Wisconsin gubernatorial election was held on November 2, 1982. Democrat Anthony S. Earl won the election with 56.75% of the vote, defeating Republican Terry J. Kohler.

As of 2026, this is the most recent Wisconsin gubernatorial election where the Democratic candidate won by a double-digit margin. Additionally, this is the most recent gubernatorial election in which a Democrat has carried Fond Du Lac County, Jefferson County, Kewaunee County, and Sheboygan County.

== Primary election ==
The primary election was held on September 14, 1982. Nominees for Governor and Lieutenant Governor were selected in separate primaries before running on a joint ticket in the general election.

=== Republican party ===
==== Governor ====
===== Candidates =====
- Lowell B. Jackson, Secretary of Wisconsin Department of Transportation
- Terry J. Kohler, businessman

===== Results =====
Republican gubernatorial primary results
Party	Candidate	Votes	%
Republican	Terry J. Kohler	227,844	68.16%
Republican	Lowell B. Jackson	106,413	31.84%
Total votes		334,257	100.00%

==== Lieutenant Governor ====
===== Candidates =====
- Russell A. Olson, incumbent lieutenant governor

===== Results =====
Republican lieutenant gubernatorial primary results
Party	Candidate	Votes	%
Republican	Russell A. Olson (incumbent)	276,496	100.00%
Total votes		276,496	100.00%

=== Democratic party ===
==== Governor ====
===== Candidates =====
- Anthony S. Earl, former Secretary of Wisconsin Department of Natural Resources
- Martin J. Schreiber, former governor
- James B. Wood

===== Results =====
Democratic gubernatorial primary results
Party	Candidate	Votes	%
Democratic	Anthony S. Earl	268,857	45.87%
Democratic	Martin J. Schreiber	245,952	41.96%
Democratic	James B. Wood	71,282	2.64%
Total votes		586,091	100.00%

==== Lieutenant Governor ====
===== Candidates =====
- James T. Flynn, member of Wisconsin Senate
- Wayne P. Frank
- Jack H. Gleason

===== Results =====
Democratic lieutenant gubernatorial primary results
Party	Candidate	Votes	%
Democratic	James T. Flynn	259,638	54.98%
Democratic	Wayne P. Frank	150,592	31.89%
Democratic	Jack H. Gleason	62,022	13.13%
Total votes		472,252	100.00%

=== Libertarian party ===
==== Governor ====
===== Candidates =====
- Larry Smiley

===== Results =====
Libertarian gubernatorial primary results
Party	Candidate	Votes	%
Libertarian	Larry Smiley	1,723	100.00%
Total votes		1,723	100.00%

==== Lieutenant Governor ====
===== Candidates =====
- Gerald Shidell

===== Results =====
Libertarian lieutenant gubernatorial primary results
Party	Candidate	Votes	%
Libertarian	Gerald Shidell	1,766	100.00%
Total votes		1,766	100.00%

=== Constitution party ===
==== Governor ====
===== Candidates =====
- James P. Wickstrom, Constitution nominee for United States Senate in 1980

===== Results =====
Constitution gubernatorial primary results
Party	Candidate	Votes	%
Constitution	James P. Wickstrom	1,684	100.00%
Total votes		1,684	100.00%

==== Lieutenant Governor ====
===== Candidates =====
- Diana K. Simonson

===== Results =====
Constitution lieutenant gubernatorial primary results
Party	Candidate	Votes	%
Constitution	Diana K. Simonson	1,526	100.00%
Total votes		1,526	100.00%

=== Independent nominations ===
==== Governor ====
===== Candidates =====
- Peter Seidman

===== Results =====
Independent gubernatorial primary results
Party	Candidate	Votes	%
Independent	Peter Seidman	902	100.00%
Total votes		902	100.00%

==== Lieutenant Governor ====
===== Candidates =====
- Margo Storsteen

===== Results =====
Independent lieutenant gubernatorial primary results
Party	Candidate	Votes	%
Independent	Margo Storsteen	817	100.00%
Total votes		817	100.00%

== General election ==
=== Candidates ===
- Anthony S. Earl & James T. Flynn, Democrat
- Terry J. Kohler & Russell A. Olson, Republican
- Larry Smiley & Gerald Shidell, Libertarian
- James P. Wickstrom & Diana K. Simonson, Constitution
- Peter Seidman & Margo Storsteen, Independent

=== Results ===
1982 Wisconsin gubernatorial election
Party	Candidate	Votes	%	±%
Democratic	Anthony S. Earl	896,872	56.75%	+11.86%
Republican	Terry J. Kohler	662,738	41.94%	−12.43%
Libertarian	Larry Smiley	9,734	0.62%	
Constitution	James P. Wickstrom	7,721	0.49%	
Independent	Peter Seidman	3,025	0.19%	
	Scattering	214	0.01%	
Majority		234,134	14.82%	
Total votes		1,580,304	100.00%	
Democratic gain from Republican		Swing	+14.82%	

=== Results by county ===
Earl was the first Democrat since Albert G. Schmedeman in 1934 to win Fond du Lac County and Winnebago County and no Democrat has won the former since this election. Grant County and Richland County would not vote for the losing candidate again until 2022.

County	Anthony S. Earl Democratic		Terry J. Kohler Republican		All Others Various		Margin		Total votes cast
County	#	%	#	%	#	%	#	%	Total votes cast
Adams	2,514	51.82%	2,249	46.36%	88	1.81%	265	5.46%	4,851
Ashland	3,949	59.84%	2,558	38.76%	92	1.39%	1,391	21.08%	6,599
Barron	6,355	50.56%	6,136	48.81%	79	0.63%	219	1.74%	12,570
Bayfield	3,761	60.01%	2,448	39.06%	58	0.93%	1,313	20.95%	6,267
Brown	31,375	53.46%	26,605	45.33%	706	1.20%	4,770	8.13%	58,686
Buffalo	2,772	53.99%	2,314	45.07%	48	0.93%	458	8.92%	5,134
Burnett	4,179	60.03%	2,660	38.21%	122	1.75%	1,519	21.82%	6,961
Calumet	4,953	47.36%	5,246	50.16%	260	2.49%	-293	-2.80%	10,459
Chippewa	9,128	59.35%	6,021	39.15%	232	1.51%	3,107	20.20%	15,381
Clark	5,056	46.54%	5,610	51.64%	198	1.82%	-554	-5.10%	10,864
Columbia	7,056	48.98%	7,158	49.69%	192	1.33%	-102	-0.71%	14,406
Crawford	2,913	44.70%	3,543	54.37%	61	0.94%	-630	-9.67%	6,517
Dane	86,288	70.48%	34,631	28.29%	1,513	1.24%	51,657	42.19%	122,432
Dodge	10,425	46.38%	11,745	52.25%	309	1.37%	-1,320	-5.87%	22,479
Door	4,292	42.29%	5,790	57.06%	66	0.65%	-1,498	-14.76%	10,148
Douglas	11,160	73.24%	3,961	26.00%	116	0.76%	7,199	47.25%	15,237
Dunn	6,588	57.09%	4,778	41.41%	173	1.50%	1,810	15.69%	11,539
Eau Claire	16,520	61.41%	10,025	37.26%	358	1.33%	6,495	24.14%	26,903
Florence	667	45.59%	766	52.36%	30	2.05%	-99	-6.77%	1,463
Fond du Lac	16,302	51.34%	14,921	46.99%	532	1.68%	1,381	4.35%	31,755
Forest	1,998	55.47%	1,509	41.89%	95	2.64%	489	13.58%	3,602
Grant	5,960	41.59%	8,268	57.69%	103	0.72%	-2,308	-16.10%	14,331
Green	4,423	45.90%	5,118	53.11%	96	1.00%	-695	-7.21%	9,637
Green Lake	2,292	35.32%	4,099	63.16%	99	1.53%	-1,807	-27.84%	6,490
Iowa	2,759	44.59%	3,361	54.31%	68	1.10%	-602	-9.73%	6,188
Iron	2,105	63.87%	1,136	34.47%	55	1.67%	969	29.40%	3,296
Jackson	3,710	51.24%	3,426	47.31%	105	1.45%	284	3.92%	7,241
Jefferson	9,862	49.81%	9,629	48.63%	309	1.56%	233	1.18%	19,800
Juneau	2,954	40.44%	4,230	57.91%	121	1.66%	-1,276	-17.47%	7,305
Kenosha	24,315	68.30%	11,015	30.94%	271	0.76%	13,300	37.36%	35,601
Kewaunee	3,695	49.83%	3,640	49.09%	80	1.08%	55	0.74%	7,415
La Crosse	17,962	56.89%	13,191	41.78%	420	1.33%	4,771	15.11%	31,573
Lafayette	2,889	41.80%	3,987	57.69%	35	0.51%	-1,098	-15.89%	6,911
Langlade	3,667	52.67%	3,199	45.95%	96	1.38%	468	6.72%	6,962
Lincoln	4,768	48.08%	4,932	49.73%	217	2.19%	-164	-1.65%	9,917
Manitowoc	17,069	59.78%	10,447	36.59%	1,038	3.64%	6,622	23.19%	28,554
Marathon	19,451	49.87%	18,602	47.69%	950	2.44%	849	2.18%	39,003
Marinette	6,757	48.70%	6,985	50.34%	134	0.97%	-228	-1.64%	13,876
Marquette	1,868	44.71%	2,215	53.02%	95	2.27%	-347	-8.31%	4,178
Menominee	439	78.96%	113	20.32%	4	0.72%	326	58.63%	556
Milwaukee	210,142	67.34%	98,925	31.70%	2,988	0.96%	111,217	35.64%	312,055
Monroe	4,156	41.42%	5,752	57.32%	127	1.27%	-1,596	-15.90%	10,035
Oconto	4,991	43.67%	6,305	55.17%	133	1.16%	-1,314	-11.50%	11,429
Oneida	6,525	50.82%	5,996	46.70%	319	2.48%	529	4.12%	12,840
Outagamie	21,655	52.84%	18,741	45.73%	588	1.43%	2,914	7.11%	40,984
Ozaukee	9,852	42.54%	13,147	56.77%	161	0.70%	-3,295	-14.23%	23,160
Pepin	1,297	59.04%	885	40.28%	15	0.68%	412	18.75%	2,197
Pierce	5,768	57.88%	4,118	41.32%	79	0.79%	1,650	16.56%	9,965
Polk	5,933	57.03%	4,344	41.76%	126	1.21%	1,589	15.27%	10,403
Portage	12,704	67.79%	5,690	30.36%	347	1.85%	7,014	37.43%	18,741
Price	2,764	46.49%	3,033	51.01%	149	2.51%	-269	-4.52%	5,946
Racine	33,079	60.48%	20,914	38.24%	700	1.28%	12,165	22.24%	54,693
Richland	2,250	35.75%	3,971	63.10%	72	1.14%	-1,721	-27.35%	6,293
Rock	26,130	62.10%	15,432	36.68%	515	1.22%	10,698	25.42%	42,077
Rusk	2,875	51.41%	2,598	46.46%	119	2.13%	277	4.95%	5,592
Sauk	6,430	46.10%	7,403	53.08%	115	0.82%	-973	-6.98%	13,948
Sawyer	2,286	49.03%	2,321	49.79%	55	1.18%	-35	-0.75%	4,662
Shawano	4,863	40.99%	6,708	56.54%	294	2.48%	-1,845	-15.55%	11,865
Sheboygan	21,211	56.62%	15,769	42.09%	482	1.29%	5,442	14.53%	37,462
St. Croix	8,557	58.00%	6,097	41.32%	100	0.68%	2,460	16.67%	14,754
Taylor	3,237	48.85%	3,255	49.12%	134	2.02%	-18	-0.27%	6,626
Trempealeau	4,959	56.41%	3,753	42.69%	79	0.90%	1,206	13.72%	8,791
Vernon	4,124	42.98%	5,328	55.52%	144	1.50%	-1,204	-12.55%	9,596
Vilas	3,028	41.48%	4,054	55.53%	218	2.99%	-1,026	-14.05%	7,300
Walworth	9,603	43.66%	12,229	55.59%	165	0.75%	-2,626	-11.94%	21,997
Washburn	2,817	52.22%	2,528	46.86%	50	0.93%	289	5.36%	5,395
Washington	12,114	46.59%	13,505	51.93%	385	1.48%	-1,391	-5.35%	26,004
Waukesha	43,128	46.82%	47,860	51.96%	1,119	1.21%	-4,732	-5.14%	92,107
Waupaca	5,307	40.90%	7,497	57.78%	171	1.32%	-2,190	-16.88%	12,975
Waushara	2,432	41.42%	3,360	57.23%	79	1.35%	-928	-15.81%	5,871
Winnebago	24,375	52.23%	21,649	46.39%	641	1.37%	2,726	5.84%	46,665
Wood	13,084	52.78%	11,304	45.60%	401	1.62%	1,780	7.18%	24,789
Total	896,872	56.75%	662,738	41.94%	20,694	1.31%	234,134	14.82%	1,580,304

==== Counties that flipped from Republican to Democratic ====
- Adams
- Brown
- Chippewa
- Dane
- Eau Claire
- Fond du Lac
- Forest
- Jackson
- Jefferson
- Kewaunee
- La Crosse
- Langlade
- Marathon
- Oneida
- Outagamie
- Portage
- Racine
- Rock
- Rusk
- Sheboygan
- Trempealeau
- Winnebago
- Wood

==== Counties that flipped from Democratic to Republican ====
- Florence
