= Tony Earl =

American politician (1936–2023)

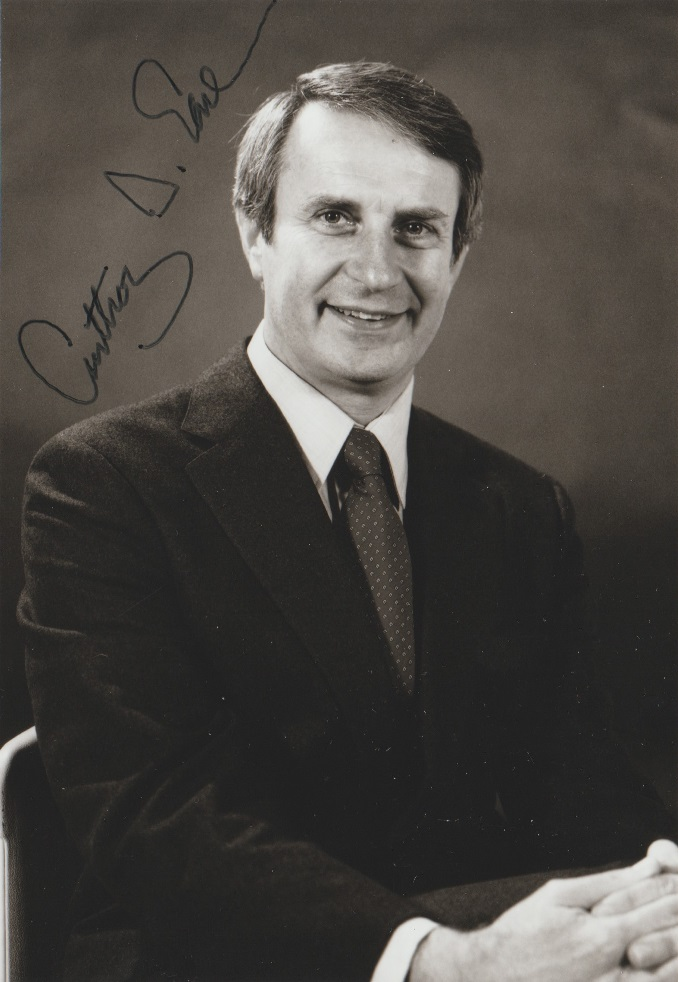
- Earl in c. 1983

41st Governor of Wisconsin
- In office January 3, 1983 – January 5, 1987
- Lieutenant: James Flynn
- Preceded by: Lee Dreyfus
- Succeeded by: Tommy Thompson

Secretary of the Wisconsin Department of Natural Resources
- In office December 15, 1975 – November 1, 1980
- Governor: Patrick Lucey; Martin J. Schreiber; Lee S. Dreyfus
- Preceded by: Lester P. Voigt
- Succeeded by: Carroll Besadny

Secretary of the Wisconsin Department of Administration
- In office January 6, 1975 – December 15, 1975
- Governor: Patrick Lucey
- Preceded by: Joe Nusbaum
- Succeeded by: Robert Dunn

Member of the Wisconsin Assembly
- In office January 1, 1973 – January 6, 1975
- Preceded by: Constituency established
- Succeeded by: Edward F. McClain
- Constituency: 85th district
- In office October 14, 1969 – January 1, 1973
- Preceded by: Dave Obey
- Succeeded by: Constituency abolished
- Constituency: Marathon 2nd district

Personal details
- Born: Anthony Scully Earl; April 12, 1936 St. Ignace, Michigan, U.S.
- Died: February 23, 2023 (aged 86) Madison, Wisconsin, U.S.
- Party: Democratic
- Spouses: Sheila Coyle (m. 1962; div. 2003); Jane Nemke (m. 2011)
- Children: 4
- Education: Michigan State University (BA); University of Chicago (JD)

Military service
- Allegiance: United States
- Branch/service: United States Navy

Anthony Scully Earl (April 12, 1936 – February 23, 2023) was an American lawyer and Democratic politician who served as the 41st governor of Wisconsin from 1983 until 1987. Prior to his election as governor, he served as secretary of the Wisconsin Department of Administration and secretary of the Wisconsin Department of Natural Resources in the administration of Governor Patrick Lucey. He also served three terms in the Wisconsin State Assembly, representing Marathon County.

== Early life and career ==
Earl was born in St. Ignace, Michigan, the son of Ethlynne Julia (Scully) and Russell K. Earl. He graduated from Michigan State University in 1958 and earned a J.D. from the University of Chicago. After four years in the U.S. Navy, including two years as a legal officer, Earl made his way to Wisconsin in 1965. He was the district attorney of Marathon County, Wisconsin from 1965 to 1966, and the city attorney of Wausau, Wisconsin from 1966 to 1969. That year, he was elected to the Wisconsin State Assembly, filling the seat vacated by David Obey, who was elected a member of the United States House of Representatives.

In 1974, Earl left the Assembly to run for Wisconsin Attorney General, but was defeated in the primary by Bronson La Follette. Upon his defeat, then-Gov. Patrick Lucey named Earl secretary of the Department of Administration. Later, Earl became Secretary of the Wisconsin Department of Natural Resources (DNR) where his list of accomplishments include addressing the State's surface water pollution.

== Governor of Wisconsin ==
In 1982, Earl ran for governor when Lee S. Dreyfus unexpectedly declined to run for re-election, and soon the Wisconsin Democratic Party's hopes of reclaiming the governor's mansion became very real. As head of the state Department of Natural Resources, Earl was well-received as a staunch defender of the environment and a problem-solver. Earl used that reputation to defeat former Governor Martin J. Schreiber, in the Democratic primary for governor. Earl went on to defeat the Republican candidate, Terry Jodok Kohler, in a landslide victory.

However, Earl's tenure as governor was a challenge from the start. By the time he took office, Wisconsin was marred by a budget deficit of nearly $1 billion and a 12% unemployment rate. Earl signed legislation making the 5% sales tax permanent and also added a 10% surtax on state income tax which was later reduced. Once the state was fiscally sound, Earl passed initiatives improving the environment, education, and equal opportunity. Earl appointed Doris Hanson, the State's first female to hold the office of secretary of the Department of Administration and Howard Fuller, the first African-American appointed to a cabinet position heading the Department of Employee Relations. Due to disagreements over healthcare reform, prison staffing, wage freezes, and other matters, Earl's relations with state labor Unions soured and made his tenure as governor all the more complicated.

After restoring the state following one of the worst economic predicaments in state history, Governor Earl was ousted after one term. State Assembly Minority Leader Tommy Thompson, a Republican, staunchly opposed Earl's policies and was elected in 1986 to the first of four consecutive terms. Earl Bricker wrote an essay, "goodbye to Wisconsin Governor Tony Earl" bemoaning that Tommy Thompson had defeated Earl in the 1986 election, and that his "pro-family" stance may have given him wider demographic appeal than Earl's defense of gay and lesbian rights.

== Post-gubernatorial career ==
Earl served on the governing board of "Common Cause Wisconsin" from 1995 until 2005. a non-partisan, non-profit citizen's lobby affiliated with national Common Cause. In 1990, Earl was elected to the Common Cause National Governing Board and served until 1996. CC/WI promotes campaign finance reform, ethics and lobby reform, open meetings laws, voting rights, non-partisan redistricting, and other issues concerning the promotion and maintenance of accountable government. Earl also served on the board of the Chicago-based Joyce Foundation for many years until 2013.

In July 2004, Earl was recognized at the 12th Annual Outreach Awards for his acknowledgment of the needs of the gay and lesbian community during his term in office; he received the organization's Political Courage Award. He served on the board of directors of the American Transmission Company which assumed ownership, operation, planning, maintenance, and monitoring of all the electrical transmission assets formerly owned by a number of Wisconsin utility companies, cooperatives, and municipal utilities. He was a past partner in one of the largest law firms (more than 400 lawyers) in Wisconsin, Quarles and Brady. The Peshtigo River State Forest in Marinette and Oconto counties has been renamed Governor Earl Peshtigo State Forest according to the Wisconsin Department of Natural Resources. September 25, 2019, as reported in the Appleton Post-Crescent on September 26, 2019.

== Personal life and death ==
Tony Earl married Sheila Rose Coyle of Chicago, in the summer of 1962. They met while he was a student at the University of Chicago Law School. They had four daughters together, and were married for more than 30 years before separating in 1995. Their divorce was finalized in 2003. In 2011, Earl married Jane Nemke.

Earl had a stroke on February 19, 2023, and died four days later, on February 23, at the UW Health University Hospital, 48 days short of his 87th birthday.

== Electoral history ==
=== Wisconsin Assembly, Marathon 2nd district (1969, 1970) ===
1969 Wisconsin Assembly Marathon 2nd District special election
Party	Candidate	Votes	%	±%
Special Election, October 7, 1969
Democratic	Anthony S. Earl	4,716	54.30%	−3.75%
Republican	Dorthea J. Baguhn	3,969	45.70%	
Plurality		747	8.60%	-7.49%
Total votes		8,685	100.0%	-52.62%
Democratic hold				

1970 Wisconsin Assembly Marathon 2nd District election
Party	Candidate	Votes	%	±%
General Election, November 3, 1970
Democratic	Anthony S. Earl (incumbent)	11,182	70.85%	+16.55%
Republican	Thomas L. Miler	4,601	29.15%	
Plurality		6,581	41.70%	+33.10%
Total votes		15,783	100.0%	+81.73%
Democratic hold				

=== Wisconsin Assembly, 85th district (1972) ===
1972 Wisconsin Assembly 85th District election
Party	Candidate	Votes	%	±%
General Election, November 7, 1972
Democratic	Anthony S. Earl	14,432	100.0%	
Total votes		14,432	100.0%	
Democratic win (new seat)				

=== Wisconsin Attorney General (1974) ===
1974 Wisconsin Attorney General Election
Party	Candidate	Votes	%	±%
Democratic Party Primary, September 10, 1974
Democratic	Bronson La Follette	132,538	40.85%	
Democratic	Anthony S. Earl	106,041	32.69%	
Democratic	Thomas M. Jacobson	50,678	15.62%	
Democratic	Gerald D. Lorge	35,165	10.84%	
Total votes		324,422	100.0%	

=== Wisconsin Governor (1982, 1986) ===
Wisconsin Gubernatorial Election, 1982
Party	Candidate	Votes	%	±%
Democratic Party Primary, September 14, 1982
Democratic	Anthony S. Earl	268,857	45.87%	
Democratic	Martin J. Schreiber	245,952	41.96%	
Democratic	James B. Wood	71,282	12.16%	
Total votes		586,091	100.0%	
General Election, November 2, 1982
Democratic	Anthony S. Earl & James T. Flynn	896,872	56.75%	+11.86%
Republican	Terry J. Kohler & Russell A. Olson	662,738	41.94%	−12.43%
Libertarian	Larry Smiley & Gerald Shidell	9,734	0.62%	
Constitution	James P. Wickstrom & Diana K. Simonson	7,721	0.49%	+0.07%
Independent	Peter Seidman & Margo Storsteen	3,025	0.19%	+0.09%
	Scattering	254	0.02%	
Plurality		234,134	14.82%	+5.34%
Total votes		1,580,344	100.0%	+5.29%
Democratic gain from Republican		Swing	24.29%	

1986 Wisconsin gubernatorial election
Party	Candidate	Votes	%	±%
Democratic Party Primary, September 9, 1986
Democratic	Anthony S. Earl (incumbent)	215,183	80.30%	
Democratic	Edmond Hou-Seye	52,784	19.70%	
Total votes		267,967	100.0%	
General Election, November 4, 1986
Republican	Tommy Thompson & Scott McCallum	805,090	52.74%	+10.80%
Democratic	Anthony S. Earl (incumbent) & Sharon Metz	705,578	46.22%	−10.53%
Labor–Farm	Kathryn A. Christensen & John Ervin Bergum	10,323	0.68%	
Independent	Darold E. Wall & Irma L. Lotts	3,913	0.26%	
Independent	Sanford Knapp & Verdell Hallingstad	1,668	0.11%	
	Scattering	1	0.00%	
Plurality		99,512	6.52%	-8.30%
Total votes		1,526,573	100.0%	-3.40%
Republican gain from Democratic		Swing	21.33%	

=== U.S. Senate (1988) ===
1988 United States Senate election in Wisconsin
Party	Candidate	Votes	%	±%
Democratic Party Primary, September 13, 1988
Democratic	Herb Kohl	249,226	46.78%	
Democratic	Anthony S. Earl	203,479	38.19%	
Democratic	Edward R. Garvey	55,225	10.37%	
Democratic	Douglas La Follette	19,819	3.72%	
Democratic	Edmond Hou-Seye	5,040	0.95%	
Total votes		532,789	100.0%	

Wisconsin State Assembly
Preceded by David Obey	Member of the Wisconsin State Assembly from the Marathon 2nd district 1969–1973	District abolished
District created	Member of the Wisconsin State Assembly from the 85th district 1973–1975	Succeeded by Edward F. McClain
Party political offices
Preceded by Martin J. Schreiber	Democratic nominee for Governor of Wisconsin; 1982, 1986	Succeeded by Thomas A. Loftus
Political offices
Preceded by Lee S. Dreyfus	Governor of Wisconsin; 1983–1987	Succeeded by Tommy Thompson
