= 1980 United States Senate election in Wisconsin =

- November 4, 1980
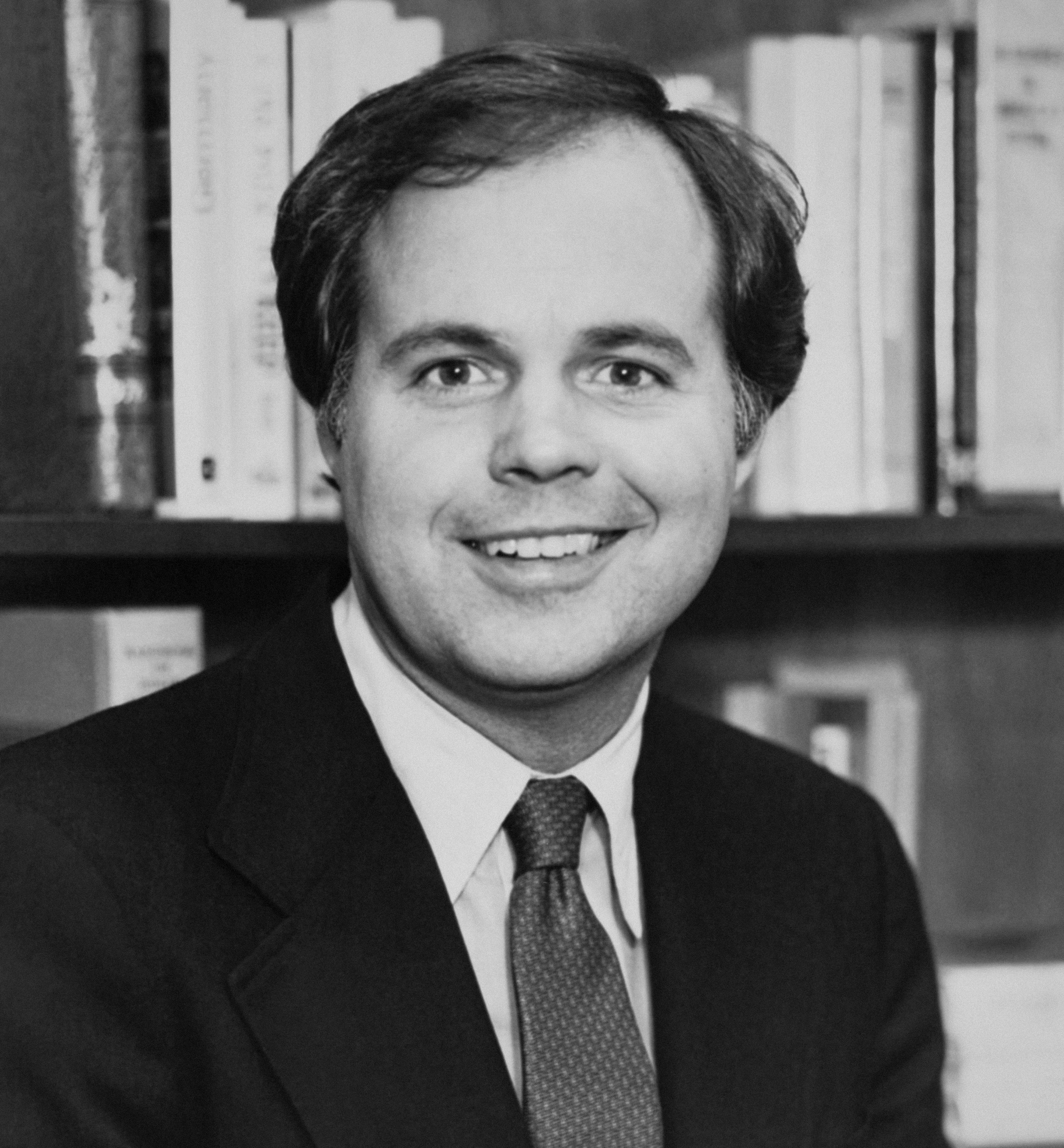

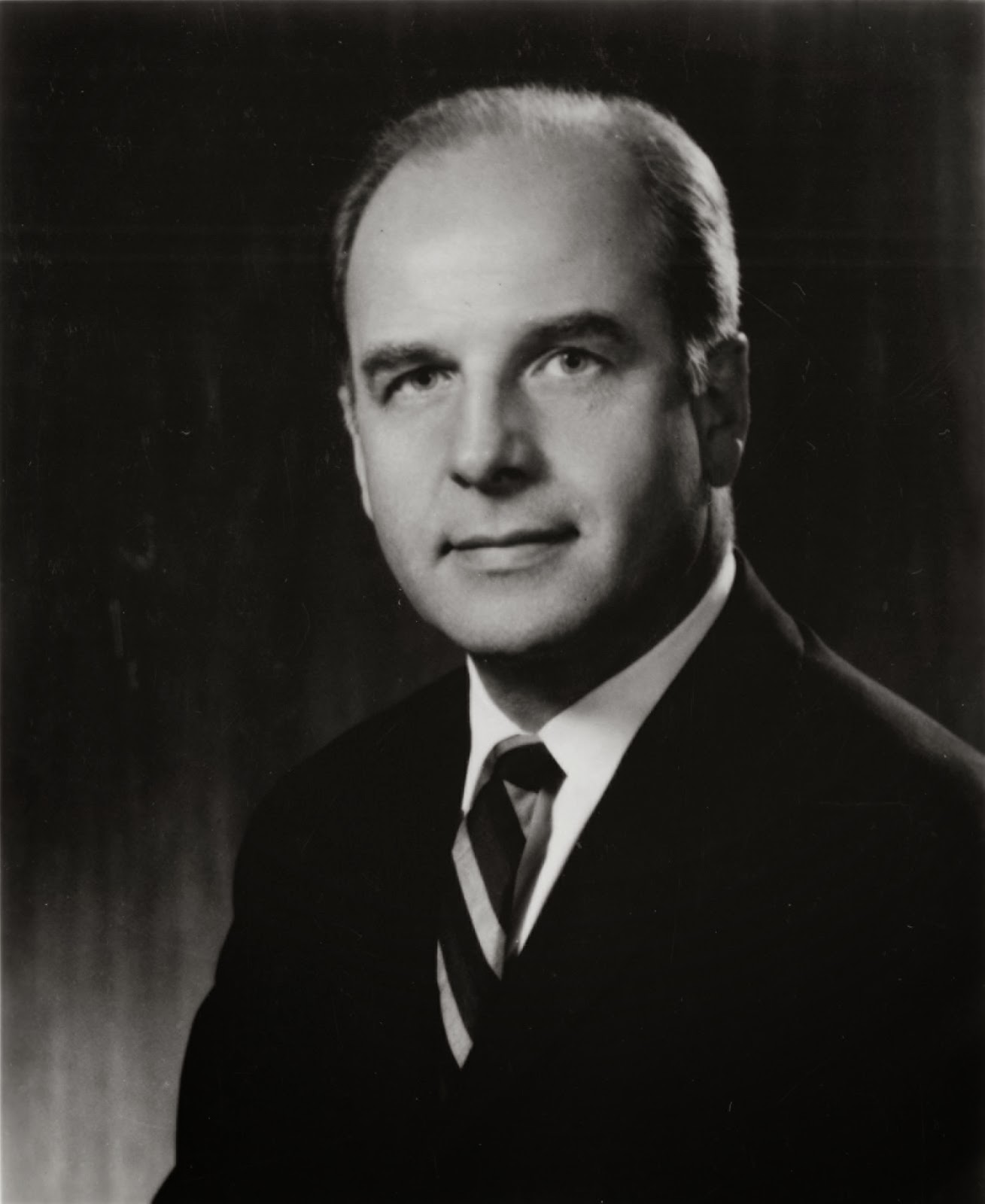
Nominee	Bob Kasten	Gaylord Nelson
Party	Republican	Democratic
Popular vote	1,106,311	1,065,487
Percentage	50.19%	48.34%
- County results Kasten: 50–60% 60–70% Nelson: 50–60% 60–70% 70–80%
U.S. senator before election
Gaylord Nelson
Democratic
Elected U.S. Senator
Bob Kasten
Republican

The 1980 United States Senate election in Wisconsin was held on November 4, 1980. Incumbent Democratic U.S. Senator Gaylord Nelson ran for re-election to a fourth term but was defeated by Bob Kasten, a Republican.

== Republican primary ==
=== Candidates ===
- Doug Cofrin, publisher of Milwaukee Magazine
- Bob Kasten, former U.S. Representative
- Terry Kohler, businessman
- Russell Olson, Lieutenant Governor

=== Results ===
Primary results by county: Kasten: 20–30%; 30–40%; 40–50%; 50–60%; 60–70%; Kohler: 20–30%; 30–40%; 40–50%; 50–60%; Cofrin: 30–40%; 40–50%; 50–60%; Olson: 40–50%

Republican primary results
Party	Candidate	Votes	%
Republican	Bob Kasten	134,586	36.77%
Republican	Terry Kohler	106,270	29.03%
Republican	Doug Cofrin	84,355	23.05%
Republican	Russell Olson	40,823	11.15%
Total votes		366,034	100.00%

== Results ==
General election results
Party	Candidate	Votes	%
Republican	Bob Kasten	1,106,311	50.19%
Democratic	Gaylord Nelson (incumbent)	1,065,487	48.34%
Constitution	James P. Wickstrom	16,156	0.73%
Libertarian	Bervin J. Larson	9,679	0.44%
Socialist Workers	Susan Hagen	6,502	0.30%
Total votes		2,204,135	100.00%
Republican gain from Democratic			

== See also ==
- 1980 United States Senate elections
