= Earl H. Elfers =

American politician

Earl H. Elfers (May 26, 1913 – September 1, 1983) was a member of the Wisconsin State Assembly.

== Biography ==
Elfers was born on May 26, 1913, in Bassett, Wisconsin. He attended high school in Wilmot, Wisconsin. He died on September 1, 1983.

== Career ==
Elfers was a Democrat. He was elected to the Assembly in 1962. The election was contested due to ballots that were initially declared invalid. The Republican-dominated lower house voted to install Russell Olson, a Republican, instead, after Elfers had already been seated. However, in 1964 the Racine Circuit Court ruled that Elfers was the legitimate assemblyman.

Additionally, Elfers was Chairman of Trevor, Wisconsin, Director of the Trevor School Board, and a member of the Kenosha County, Wisconsin Board.
