= Martin J. Schreiber =

American politician (born 1939)

Martin Schreiber
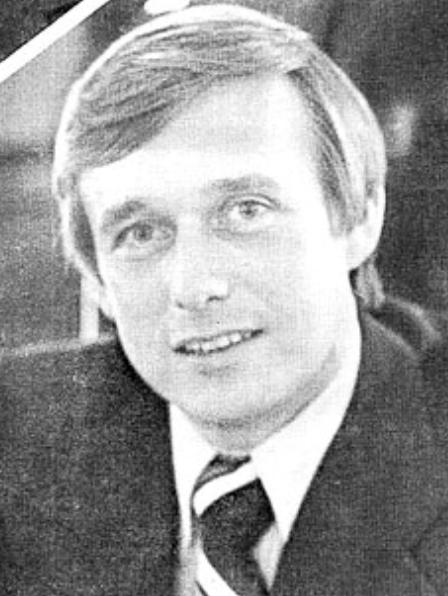
- Schreiber in 1977

39th Governor of Wisconsin
- In office July 6, 1977 – January 4, 1979
- Preceded by: Patrick Lucey
- Succeeded by: Lee Dreyfus

38th Lieutenant Governor of Wisconsin
- In office January 4, 1971 – January 4, 1979
- Governor: Patrick Lucey
- Preceded by: Jack B. Olson
- Succeeded by: Russell Olson

12th Chair of the National Lieutenant Governors Association
- In office 1972–1973
- Preceded by: Thomas Lee Judge
- Succeeded by: Edwin Reinecke

Member of the Wisconsin Senate from the 6th district
- In office January 9, 1963 – January 4, 1971
- Preceded by: William R. Moser
- Succeeded by: Mark Lipscomb Jr.

Personal details
- Born: Martin James Schreiber; April 8, 1939 (age 87) Milwaukee, Wisconsin, U.S.
- Party: Democratic
- Spouse: Elaine Thaney (m. 1961; died 2022)
- Children: 4
- Relatives: Martin E. Schreiber (father)
- Education: Valparaiso University (attended); University of Wisconsin, Milwaukee (BA); Marquette University (JD)

Martin James Schreiber (/ˈʃraɪbər/ SHRY-bər; born April 8, 1939) is an American politician, publisher, author, and lobbyist who served as the 38th lieutenant governor of Wisconsin from 1971 to 1977, and (following the resignation of Patrick Lucey) as the 39th governor of Wisconsin from 1977 to 1979. Schreiber has become an advocate on issues related to Alzheimer's disease and dementia.

== Early life and education ==
Schreiber was born in Milwaukee, Wisconsin. His father Martin E. Schreiber was a Republican member of the Wisconsin State Assembly (1941–1944), and later a member of the Milwaukee Common Council (1944 to 1976). The younger Schreiber attended the youth government and leadership program Badger Boys State in 1956 as a representative chosen from Milwaukee Lutheran High School. He attended Valparaiso University and the University of Wisconsin–Milwaukee, where he was a member of Tau Kappa Epsilon fraternity, majoring in urban studies. He later earned a J.D. degree from Marquette University Law School in 1964.

== Political career ==
=== Wisconsin State Senate ===
A member of the Democratic Party, Schreiber served in the Wisconsin State Senate from 1963 to 1971. During his political career, Schreiber focused on education, children's issues, consumer protection, and the rights of workers and the elderly. Schreiber was the youngest senator in state history, having been elected at age 23.

=== Lieutenant Governor of Wisconsin ===
In 1970, Schreiber was elected lieutenant governor on the Lucey-Schreiber ticket. He was elected the youngest chairperson for the National Lieutenant Governors Association in 1972.

=== Interim Governor of Wisconsin ===
In July 1977, following the resignation of Lucey to become the United States ambassador to Mexico, Schreiber succeeded him as Governor for the remainder of their four-year term. In the 1978 election, Schreiber faced a divisive primary challenge by developer David Carley. In the general election, political newcomer Lee S. Dreyfus, a populist Republican and skilled orator, waged an unconventional campaign and successfully attacked the Lucey-Schreiber record on taxes and big government. Schreiber lost 54% to 44%.

Following the election, Schreiber moved to Stevens Point, Wisconsin and became vice-president of Sentry Insurance. He ran for the governor's office again in 1982, campaigning against Anthony S. Earl, former head of the Wisconsin Department of Natural Resources. He did not get past the Democratic primary election and returned to Sentry Insurance.

=== Later career ===
Schreiber ran again for office in 1988, seeking the Mayoralty of Milwaukee, but was defeated by John Norquist.

In 1988, after leaving electoral politics, Schreiber formed his own public affairs consulting firm, becoming a successful lobbyist.

== Personal life ==
In 1961, Schreiber married the former Elaine Thaney. They had four children. His wife, Elaine, was a former Milwaukee public school teacher. Elaine died of Alzheimer's Disease on April 25, 2022.

Schreiber has served on the Milwaukee Public Library Board of Trustees.

=== Dementia and Alzheimer's advocacy ===
Schreiber is the author of My Two Elaines: Learning, Coping, and Surviving as an Alzheimer's Caregiver, detailing his experiences in caring for his wife, who battled Alzheimer's Disease. Schreiber helped to found the "Elaine and Friends Caregiver Help Center" and is a frequent speaker on issues relating to Alzheimer's. His book was recognized by Caring.com as one of its "Best Caregiving Books of 2018".

Schreiber helped the Alzheimer's Association launch its "Operation: Stronger Together" awareness program. He also collaborated with Wisconsin's state government and business groups to help create the "Dementia-Friendly Employers" Toolkit, which has been used by human resources departments and employee assistance programs.

== Works ==
- My Two Elaines: Learning, Coping, and Surviving as an Alzheimer's Caregiver with Cathy Breitenbucher (Newark, Book Publishers Network, 2016 and Harper Horizon, 2022)

Party political offices
Preceded by Patrick Lucey	Democratic nominee for Lieutenant Governor of Wisconsin; 1966	Succeeded by Taylor Benson
Preceded by Taylor Benson	Democratic nominee for Lieutenant Governor of Wisconsin; 1970, 1974	Succeeded by Doug La Follette
Preceded by Patrick Lucey	Democratic nominee for Governor of Wisconsin; 1978	Succeeded by Tony Earl
Political offices
Preceded by Jack B. Olson	Lieutenant Governor of Wisconsin; 1971–1977	Succeeded by Russell Olson
Preceded by Patrick Lucey	Governor of Wisconsin; 1977–1979	Succeeded by Lee S. Dreyfus
U.S. order of precedence (ceremonial)
Preceded by Martha McSally as Former U.S. Senator	Order of precedence of the United States; Within Wisconsin	Succeeded by Scott McCallum as Former Governor
Preceded by Chet Culver as Former Governor	Order of precedence of the United States; Outside Wisconsin	Succeeded by Scott McCallum as Former Governor
