= Terry Kohler =

- Born: Terry Jodok Kohler; May 14, 1934; Sheboygan, Wisconsin, U.S.
- Died: September 20, 2016 (aged 82); Sheboygan, Wisconsin, U.S.
- Education: Admiral Farragut Academy
- Alma mater: M.I.T.
- Occupations: CEO, Windway Capital Corporation
- Political party: Republican
- Spouses: Diana Prange (1956-1976); Mary Simpson (1981-2016)
- Children: 7
- Parent: Walter J. Kohler Jr. (father)

Terry Kohler (May 14, 1934 – September 20, 2016) was a member of the Kohler family of Wisconsin and an American businessman, Wisconsin Republican Party leader, sportsman, philanthropist, and conservationist.

== Early life ==
Terry Kohler was born on May 14, 1934, in Sheboygan, Wisconsin. His father was Walter J. Kohler Jr. (1904–76), a sales executive at the Kohler Company, president of The Vollrath Company, and a three-term Governor of Wisconsin. His mother was Marie Celeste McVoy Kohler (1900-1974), a Chicago socialite who had been married and divorced and had one child. Terry's sister was Charlotte Nicolette (Niki) Kohler (1936-2012). The Kohlers divorced in 1946 and Terry was raised by his father at Windway, his parents' estate not far from the Kohler factory in the village of Kohler.

In 1952, Kohler graduated from the Admiral Farragut Academy. In 1962, he received a bachelor of science degree from the Massachusetts Institute of Technology, majoring in industrial management. A year later he earned an MBA in the same field from the MIT Sloan School of Management.

Kohler married Diana Prange (1932-1991) of Sheboygan in 1956 (herself an heir to the H.C. Prange Co. department store fortune), and they had three daughters. The couple divorced in 1976. In 1981, Kohler married Mary Simpson, the mother of four sons.

An outdoor sports enthusiast, Kohler raced sports cars in the mid-1960s, and spent six years on the National Ski Patrol. Kohler has sailed and raced sailboats for more than six decades, winning numerous trophies. He is a past Commodore of the Lake Michigan Sail Racing Federation. He was also awarded the Nathanael Herreshoff Trophy by US Sailing in 2009.

== Career ==
Kohler's full-time association with the Vollrath Company, a manufacturer of stainless steel and aluminum wares, began in 1963. In 1976, he became the seventh president of the company. Kohler became chairman of the board and chief executive officer in 1982.

Under Kohler's leadership, the company expanded dramatically. In July 1984, Lowell North sold his famous sailmaking company to Kohler, and in January 1989, North Sails and the Vollrath Company became separate corporations under the Windway Capital Corporation, a holding company. Kohler was President and Chairman of the Board of Windway Capital Corporation, Chairman of North Technology Group, and is on the board at Vollrath.

== Political life ==
Kohler was active in the Republican Party for many years before an unsuccessful attempt to win the party's nomination for the United States Senate in 1980, losing to Bob Kasten. In 1982 Kohler secured the GOP nomination for Governor, but subsequently lost to Democrat Tony Earl by a 57% to 42% margin, the worst showing for a Republican gubernatorial candidate since 1942.

In 1986 Kohler ran for surveyor of Douglas County, running on a platform that supported abolishing the position of surveyor as an elected office. He lost the election.

In 1991 Kohler was nominated by Governor Tommy Thompson for a seat on the Board of Regents of the University of Wisconsin System. The nomination was heavily criticized by liberals in the State Senate and newspaper editorials, who cited Kohler's past racial slurs, commentary about the "immoral" and "sick" behavior of homosexuals, and other viewpoints. The nomination was ultimately rejected by the Senate.

Beyond elected office, both Kohler and his wife remained active inside the Republican Party. In May 2002, Kohler was elected to the GOP National Committee, serving until mid-February, 2007. In 2004, he was a member of the Bush-Cheney Campaign Steering Committee. Since 1984, the Kohlers have been supporters of former House Speaker Newt Gingrich.

Kohler died at his home in Sheboygan on September 20, 2016, at the age of 82.

== Philanthropy and conservation ==
Kohler and his wife were involved in efforts to save trumpeter swans, whooping cranes, and Siberian cranes from extinction.

Party political offices
Preceded by Lee S. Dreyfus	Republican nominee for Governor of Wisconsin; 1982	Succeeded by Tommy Thompson
