= Russell Olson =

39th Lieutenant Governor of Wisconsin

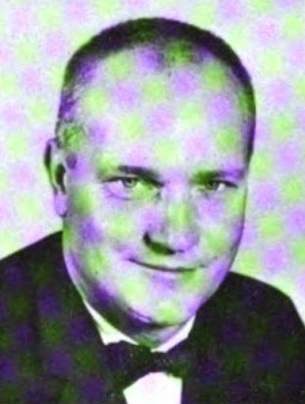

39th Lieutenant Governor of Wisconsin
- In office January 1, 1979 – January 3, 1983
- Governor: Lee S. Dreyfus
- Preceded by: Martin J. Schreiber
- Succeeded by: James T. Flynn

Member of the Wisconsin State Assembly
- In office January 1, 1973 – January 1, 1979
- Preceded by: Position established
- Succeeded by: Mary Wagner
- Constituency: 66th district
- In office January 2, 1967 – January 4, 1971
- Preceded by: Earl H. Elfers
- Succeeded by: Eugene Dorff
- Constituency: Kenosha 2nd district
- In office February 7, 1963 – May 21, 1964
- Preceded by: Earl H. Elfers
- Succeeded by: Earl H. Elfers
- Constituency: Kenosha 2nd district
- In office January 2, 1961 – January 7, 1963
- Preceded by: Earl D. Morton
- Succeeded by: Earl H. Elfers
- Constituency: Kenosha 2nd district

Personal details
- Born: February 19, 1924 Chicago, Illinois
- Died: April 14, 2010 (aged 86) Holmes Beach, Florida
- Party: Republican
- Spouse: Fran (m. 1947)
- Children: 4 daughters (1 deceased)

Military service
- Allegiance: United States
- Branch/service: United States Marine Corps
- Years of service: 1942–1946
- Battles/wars: World War II: Pacific War

Russell A. Olson (February 19, 1924 – April 14, 2010) was an American farmer and Republican politician. He was the 39th Lieutenant Governor of Wisconsin (1979–1983) and was afterward appointed Midwest Director for the United States Department of Transportation in the administration of U.S. President Ronald Reagan. Before being elected Lieutenant Governor, he represented Kenosha County in the Wisconsin State Assembly for 15 years.

== Early life ==
Olson was born in Chicago, Illinois, in 1924 and educated in Chicago Public Schools. He served in the United States Marine Corps from 1942 to 1946, assigned to the Pacific theater of World War II. After the war, he briefly attended the University of Illinois but did not graduate. He moved to the rural town of Randall in Kenosha County, Wisconsin, where he raised cattle and started a family.

== Political career ==
He was elected to the Wisconsin State Assembly for the first time in 1960, and served intermittently through 1977.

For over two years, from November 1962 to February 1965, Olson was involved in a drawn-out legal battle over the results of the 1962 Assembly election with his opponent in that election, Democrat Earl H. Elfers. Elfers had originally been declared the winner by a margin of roughly 30 votes, after some initial recounts and court challenges in which additional votes were counted and others invalidated, Elfers still led Olson by a margin of roughly 5 votes. When the Legislature returned in 1963, Elfers was accepted as the representative of Kenosha County's 2nd district. Olson, however, petitioned the Assembly to contest the election results and, five weeks into the term, the Assembly decided—in a party-line vote—to accept Olson as the rightful representative of the district and he went on to serve for the majority of the term.

Elfers challenged the Assembly's decision in the state court system, arguing that since he had been initially accepted by the Assembly, and due to the Wisconsin Constitution requiring a 2/3 majority to expel a member of the Legislature, his expulsion was invalid. In May 1964, the Racine County judge who had been assigned the case, John Ahlgrimm, ruled in favor of Elfers. Although it was too late for Elfers to participate in any of the 1963–1964 legislative session, the judge ordered that he was entitled to back pay for the session. In September, Olson challenged the decision to the Wisconsin Supreme Court. While waiting for a decision from the court, Elfers won a rematch with Olson in the 1964 election and took office. In February 1965, the Supreme Court overturned the county court's decision, ruling that Elfers' position in the Assembly in 1963 was provisional, since it was already under electoral challenge, and therefore the Legislature was within its rights to rule his election invalid in favor of the challenger, Olson.

Olson and Elfers met again in the 1966 election, and this time Olson prevailed with a clear majority.

During his time in the legislature, Olson served on the committees on Agriculture, Insurance and Banking, Small Business, Labor, and the Joint Committee on Finance. Olson later served on the UW Medical Center board and as a member of the Wisconsin Building Commission.

In 1978, he was elected the 39th Lieutenant Governor of Wisconsin, an office he held from 1979 until 1983. During his term, the Wisconsin Constitution was amended so that the lieutenant governor was no longer the president of the state senate. Olson was a conservative Republican and outspoken opponent of welfare assistance. Olson broke with mainstream Republicans in opposing the tax cuts of the 1980s, believing that doing so would make budgets unsustainable.

After his term ended, Olson worked for the U.S. Department of Transportation as Midwest Director.

== Personal life and family ==
Olson and his wife, Frances, were married in Spring 1947. They had four daughters together and retired to Florida after leaving the federal government. They resided at Anna Maria, Florida, and Holmes Beach, Florida, where he died in 2010. At the time of his death, three of his daughters were still living.

Olson was a member of the American Farm Bureau Federation, American Legion, Veterans of Foreign Wars, Wisconsin Cattlemen's Association, and Twin Lakes Businessmen's Association.

Party political offices
Preceded by John M. Alberts	Republican nominee for Lieutenant Governor of Wisconsin; 1978, 1982	Succeeded by Scott McCallum
Wisconsin State Assembly
Preceded by Earl D. Morton	Member of the Wisconsin State Assembly from the Kenosha 2nd district January 2, 1961 – January 7, 1963	Succeeded by Earl H. Elfers
Preceded by Earl H. Elfers	Member of the Wisconsin State Assembly from the Kenosha 2nd district February 7, 1963 – May 21, 1964	Succeeded by Earl H. Elfers
Preceded by Earl H. Elfers	Member of the Wisconsin State Assembly from the Kenosha 2nd district January 2, 1967 – January 4, 1971	Succeeded by Eugene Dorff
New district	Member of the Wisconsin State Assembly from the 66th district January 1, 1973 – January 1, 1979	Succeeded by Mary Wagner
Political offices
Preceded by Martin J. Schreiber	Lieutenant Governor of Wisconsin; January 1, 1979 – January 3, 1983	Succeeded by James T. Flynn
