= Lee S. Dreyfus =

American politician

Lee Dreyfus
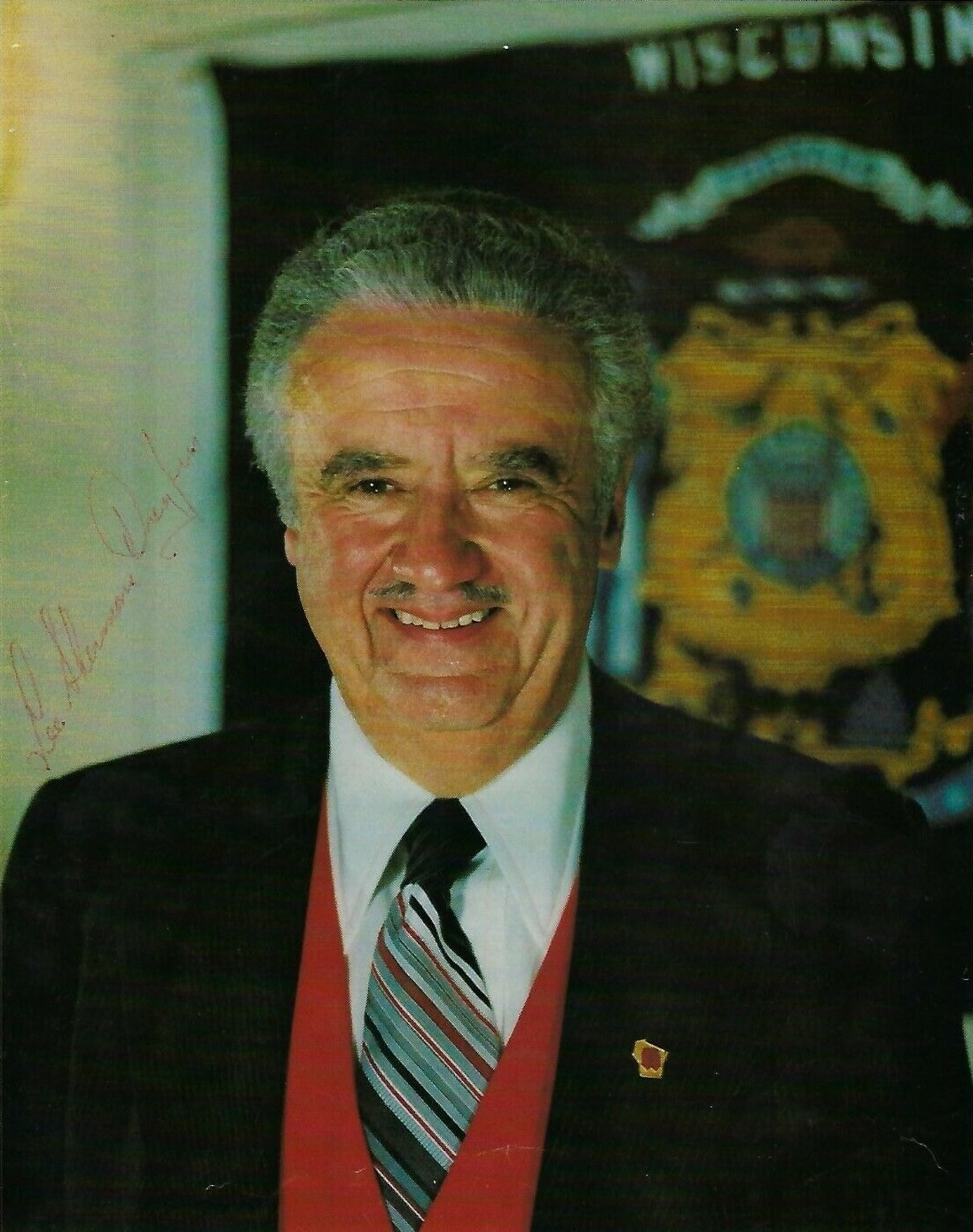
- Dreyfus as governor, c. 1979

40th Governor of Wisconsin
- In office January 4, 1979 – January 3, 1983
- Lieutenant: Russell Olson
- Preceded by: Martin Schreiber
- Succeeded by: Tony Earl

Personal details
- Born: Lee Sherman Dreyfus; June 20, 1926 Milwaukee, Wisconsin, U.S.
- Died: January 2, 2008 (aged 81) Waukesha, Wisconsin, U.S.
- Resting place: Prairie Home Cemetery; Waukesha, Wisconsin, U.S.
- Party: Republican
- Spouse: Joyce Unke (m. 1947)
- Education: University of Wisconsin–Madison
- Occupation: Politician; educator

Military service
- Allegiance: United States
- Branch/service: United States Navy
- Battles/wars: World War II

Lee Sherman Dreyfus (/ˈdreɪfəs/ DRAY-fəs; June 20, 1926 – January 2, 2008) was an American educator and politician. A member of the Republican Party, he served as the 40th governor of Wisconsin from January 4, 1979, to January 3, 1983. Dreyfus was a 33rd degree Mason in the Scottish Rite.

Prior to his election, he was the Chancellor of the University of Wisconsin–Stevens Point. He did not run for a second term in 1982 and was succeeded by Democrat Tony Earl.

== Early life ==
Dreyfus was born and raised in Milwaukee, the son of Clare (Bluett) and Woods Orlow Dreyfus. He attended Washington High School. His parents were active in the community and his father was an on-air personality for WISN radio (Young Lee was featured several times as a young actor and singer on the station). Dreyfus' mother was a longtime member of the Milwaukee School Board, serving for 25 years.

Dreyfus enlisted in the United States Navy after high school, where he learned to be an electronics technician and worked on radar repair. He was sent to the Pacific during World War II and stayed there until the war was over. After the war, he enrolled at what is now the University of Wisconsin–Madison under the GI Bill. During this time, he met Joyce Unke, whom he married in 1947. That same year, he became a member of Kappa Sigma fraternity. Dreyfus earned a bachelor's degree in 1949, a master's degree in 1952 and a doctorate in communication in 1957.

== Career ==
=== Academic career ===
Dreyfus went on to Wayne State University in Detroit, where he became general manager of the radio station and helped develop Wayne State's mass communications department. In 1962, he returned to Madison as manager of WHA-TV, and a professor of speech and broadcasting.

In 1967, Dreyfus became the president of what was known as Wisconsin State University-Stevens Point. In 1972, he became chancellor of the university, which was merged into the University of Wisconsin System and renamed University of Wisconsin–Stevens Point. Dreyfus made a point of being accessible to students, often stopping at local bars to chat with them. It was during that era that he adopted the trademark red vest as university chancellor in order to be recognizable and accessible to students on campus.

He was not always popular with students, particularly during the Vietnam War. Many students viewed the existence of an ROTC unit on campus as an endorsement of the U.S. military action. But Dreyfus argued that ROTC should be viewed as the presence of the university in the military instead of the presence of the military in the university.

=== Political career ===
A life-changing event for Dreyfus came in 1975 when he travelled to China as a representative of American colleges and universities, and became convinced of the danger of a one-party system. "That trip convinced me that the one-party system, whether it's a Marxist or a capitalist system or a military system ... is not in the best interests of the people," he once said.

Since Dreyfus was not a member of either major party until December 1977, he joined the Republican Party as a first step in what would become his candidacy for the governorship in 1978. He regarded this as a rescue mission, because he felt the Republicans were on the verge of becoming a permanent minority party in what had once been a predominantly Republican state.

The following year, he launched an unconventional, populist campaign for governor, and traveled the state in a painted school bus (affectionately dubbed "The Red Vest Whistle Stop Special"). Dreyfus caught the attention of the Wisconsin media and began connecting with voters throughout the state. The state GOP didn't want Dreyfus to win the nomination, and it endorsed then-U.S. Rep. Bob Kasten in the primary. Party backing came with financial support that usually sealed the nomination, but Dreyfus was undeterred.

An effective public speaker during the campaign, Dreyfus's most memorable quip was that states should be sovereign in most areas of law-making and that the federal government's role should be limited to only three things: "defending our shores, delivering our mail and staying the hell out of our lives." Another memorable line was: "Madison, Wisconsin is 30 square miles surrounded by reality."

With only $100,000 to spend in the primary contest, Dreyfus criss-crossed the state in his unreliable red school bus, which featured a student band, gaining free media attention to make up for the TV ads he couldn't afford to buy. Dreyfus continued to wear his trademark red vest during the campaign. This campaign was later chronicled in a book Let The People Decide written by William Kraus, who was the chairman of this campaign where, as he said, "We did everything wrong, and everything worked."

Dreyfus beat Kasten in the September GOP primary, and went on to defeat then-incumbent Acting Governor Martin Schreiber, a Democrat, with about 55 percent of the vote. He became the state's 40th governor.

=== Accomplishments in office ===
Dreyfus' style was often referred to as "Republicrat". Fiscally, Dreyfus was conservative and focused on the benefits of tax cuts and reduced size of government (echoing the Reagan conservative movement at the time). He capitalized on voters' dissatisfaction with the state's higher-than-average income tax rates, as well as general unhappiness with high inflation, high interest rates, and increasing unemployment during the Carter administration. However, Dreyfus was a social moderate who, in 1982, signed the nation's first civil rights legislation barring discrimination against gays and lesbians in jobs and housing. Dreyfus signed the gay-rights bill, saying "there are some questions the government has no business asking."

Dreyfus was renowned as a skilled orator. In televised debates prior to the election, he overcame the problem of name recognition with the electorate, as well as doubts about his experience and competency for the position. His focus on tax cuts was a questionable strategy, however. After the Wisconsin Legislature passed the revenue cuts, the State of Wisconsin was soon plagued by budget deficits, the first in many years. The deficits were caused by higher costs of government due to high inflation and interest rates. Unemployment also rose, further reducing revenue sources to government.

The resultant cuts in services and programs, such as transportation, were at odds with Wisconsin's progressive tradition. At one point, the state did not have enough money to mow down the weeds along Wisconsin highways, which became a concern to the state's tourism industry. In Dreyfus' final year in office, 1982, the state had a budget deficit of nearly $1 billion and a 12 percent unemployment rate. Dreyfus did not seek a second term as governor.

When asked in a 2005 interview for Wisconsin Eye what he considered the most important decision of his time in office, he said "building the school of veterinary medicine at the University of Wisconsin–Madison." The decision to do this was made in budget meetings before he was inaugurated and went against the advice of all of his advisors and against the wishes of the University administration as well. When told that the state didn't need more veterinarians during the course of this discussion, Dreyfus responded "This is not about veterinarians. This is about research." His view and decision proved to be prescient when in 1998 the discoveries of James Thomson, an obscure researcher at that school, opened up the many possibilities of stem cells and their uses.

=== Post-public service career ===
Dreyfus in his later years

Dreyfus declined to run for re-election in 1982. He later said that "politics was not and never has been my primary interest as it is with former governors such as Pat Lucey or Tommy Thompson."

From 1983–84, Dreyfus served as Chief Operating Officer of Sentry Insurance, Stevens Point. In 1986, he moved to Waukesha, where his son, Lee S. Dreyfus, Jr., was a state circuit court judge. He later served as Interim State Superintendent of Public Instruction and on the University of Wisconsin Board of Regents.

In 1985, he started a consulting firm, making speeches and advising the state on higher education policy; Dreyfus became a popular fixture on the lecture circuit. Dreyfus spoke out against an amendment to the Wisconsin Constitution that would have banned gay marriage and civil unions, which passed in 2006.

He wrote a weekly newspaper column between 1990 and 2007 for the Waukesha Freeman on issues of general interest. The column was carried by other newspapers in Wisconsin.

== Health issues and death ==
In February 2005, Dreyfus experienced complications from knee-replacement surgery and began to show signs of heart distress. Doctors performed a quintuple bypass surgery. Dreyfus' health declined after this surgery, and his death in January 2008 was due to respiratory failure.

== Recognition ==
The Lee Sherman Dreyfus University Center on the campus of UW–Stevens Point was named after Dreyfus in 2007. He was also elected to the Wisconsin Broadcasters' Hall of Fame.

== Notes ==
Party political offices
Preceded by William Dyke	Republican nominee for Governor of Wisconsin; 1978	Succeeded by Terry Kohler
Political offices
Preceded by Martin J. Schreiber	Governor of Wisconsin; 1979–1983	Succeeded by Tony Earl
