= Wisconsin gubernatorial elections =

Wisconsin gubernatorial elections are held on the first Tuesday after the first Monday of November every four years on even, non-presidential election years since 1970. Between 1884 and 1970, gubernatorial elections were held on every even-numbered year. Prior to 1882, gubernatorial elections were held on every odd-numbered year.

The Wisconsin gubernatorial election selects the Governor of Wisconsin and Lieutenant Governor of Wisconsin who will take office for a four-year term beginning the first Monday of the first January following the election. The election operates under first-past-the-post rules with no runoff. Prior to 1970, the lieutenant gubernatorial election was a separate election on the same ballot.

The first Wisconsin gubernatorial election was held May 8, 1848, concurrent with a referendum to ratify the Wisconsin Constitution. Since then, there have been 74 regular Wisconsin gubernatorial elections and one special recall election.

Fifty-five elections have been won by Republican candidates. Eighteen elections were won by Democratic candidates. Three were won by Wisconsin Progressives. One was won by a Whig.

Incumbents have been re-elected 35 times and have been defeated 14 times.

== List of election results ==
Percentages are approximate:

Year	Elected				Defeated		
1848	Nelson Dewey	Democratic	19,875	56%	John Hubbard Tweedy	14,621	41%
1848	Nelson Dewey	Democratic	19,875	56%	Charles Durkee	1,134	3%
1849	Nelson Dewey (inc)	Democratic	16,649	52%	Alexander L. Collins	14,621	36%
1849	Nelson Dewey (inc)	Democratic	16,649	52%	Warren Chase	3,761	12%
1851	Leonard J. Farwell	Whig	22,319	51%	Don A. J. Upham	21,812	49%
1853	William A. Barstow	Democratic	30,405	55%	Edward D. Holton	21,886	39%
1853	William A. Barstow	Democratic	30,405	55%	Henry S. Baird	3,304	6%
1855	Coles Bashford	Republican	36,198	50%	William A. Barstow (inc)	36,355	50%
1857	Alexander Randall	Republican	44,693	50%	James B. Cross	44,239	49%
1859	Alexander Randall (inc)	Republican	59,999	53%	Harrison Carroll Hobart	52,539	47%
1861	Louis P. Harvey	Republican	53,777	54%	Benjamin Ferguson	45,456	46%
1863	James T. Lewis	Republican	72,717	60%	Henry L. Palmer	49,053	40%
1865	Lucius Fairchild	Republican	58,332	55%	Harrison Carroll Hobart	48,330	45%
1867	Lucius Fairchild (inc)	Republican	73,637	52%	John J. Tallmadge	68,873	48%
1869	Lucius Fairchild (inc)	Republican	69,502	53%	Charles D. Robinson	61,239	47%
1871	Cadwallader C. Washburn	Republican	78,301	53%	James R. Doolittle	68,910	47%
1873	William Robert Taylor	Democratic	81,599	55%	Cadwallader C. Washburn (inc)	66,224	45%
1875	Harrison Ludington	Republican	85,155	50%	William Robert Taylor (inc)	84,314	50%
1877	William E. Smith	Republican	78,759	44%	James A. Mallory	70,486	40%
1877	William E. Smith	Republican	78,759	44%	Edward P. Allis	26,216	15%
1877	William E. Smith	Republican	78,759	44%	Collin M. Campbell	2,176	1%
1879	William E. Smith (inc)	Republican	100,535	53%	James Graham Jenkins	75,030	40%
1879	William E. Smith (inc)	Republican	100,535	53%	Reuben May	12,996	7%
1881	Jeremiah M. Rusk	Republican	81,754	48%	Nicholas D. Fratt	69,797	41%
1881	Jeremiah M. Rusk	Republican	81,754	48%	Theodore D. Kanouse	13,225	8%
1881	Jeremiah M. Rusk	Republican	81,754	48%	Edward P. Allis	7,002	4%
1884	Jeremiah M. Rusk (inc)	Republican	163,214	51%	Nicholas D. Fratt	143,945	45%
1884	Jeremiah M. Rusk (inc)	Republican	163,214	51%	Samuel D. Hastings	8,545	3%
1884	Jeremiah M. Rusk (inc)	Republican	163,214	51%	William L. Utley	4,274	1%
1886	Jeremiah M. Rusk (inc)	Republican	133,247	47%	Gilbert M. Woodward	114,529	40%
1886	Jeremiah M. Rusk (inc)	Republican	133,247	47%	John Cochrane	21,467	7%
1886	Jeremiah M. Rusk (inc)	Republican	133,247	47%	John Myers Olin	17,089	6%
1888	William D. Hoard	Republican	175,696	49%	James Morgan	155,423	44%
1888	William D. Hoard	Republican	175,696	49%	E. G. Durant	14,373	4%
1888	William D. Hoard	Republican	175,696	49%	D. Frank Powell	9,196	3%
1890	George Wilbur Peck	Democratic	160,388	52%	William D. Hoard (inc)	132,068	43%
1890	George Wilbur Peck	Democratic	160,388	52%	Charles Alexander	11,246	4%
1890	George Wilbur Peck	Democratic	160,388	52%	Reuben May	5,447	2%
1892	George Wilbur Peck (inc)	Democratic	178,095	48%	John Coit Spooner	170,497	46%
1892	George Wilbur Peck (inc)	Democratic	178,095	48%	Thomas C. Richmond	13,185	4%
1892	George Wilbur Peck (inc)	Democratic	178,095	48%	Cyrus M. Butt	9,638	3%
1894	William H. Upham	Republican	196,150	52%	George Wilbur Peck (inc)	142,250	38%
1894	William H. Upham	Republican	196,150	52%	D. Frank Powell	25,604	7%
1894	William H. Upham	Republican	196,150	52%	John F. Cleghorn	11,240	3%
1896	Edward Scofield	Republican	264,981	60%	Willis C. Silverthorn	169,257	38%
1896	Edward Scofield	Republican	264,981	60%	Joshua H. Berkey	8,140	2%
1896	Edward Scofield	Republican	264,981	60%	Christ Tuttrop	1,306	0%
1896	Edward Scofield	Republican	264,981	60%	Robert Henderson	407	0%
1898	Edward Scofield (inc)	Republican	173,137	53%	Hiram Wilson Sawyer	135,353	41%
1898	Edward Scofield (inc)	Republican	173,137	53%	Albinus A. Worsley	8,518	3%
1898	Edward Scofield (inc)	Republican	173,137	53%	Eugene W. Chafin	8,078	2%
1898	Edward Scofield (inc)	Republican	173,137	53%	Howard Tuttle	2,544	1%
1898	Edward Scofield (inc)	Republican	173,137	53%	Henry Riese	1,473	0%
1898	Edward Scofield (inc)	Republican	173,137	53%	Robert M. La Follette	112	0%
1900	Robert M. La Follette	Republican	264,419	60%	Louis G. Bomrich	160,674	36%
1900	Robert M. La Follette	Republican	264,419	60%	J. Burritt Smith	9,707	2%
1900	Robert M. La Follette	Republican	264,419	60%	Howard Tuttle	6,590	1%
1900	Robert M. La Follette	Republican	264,419	60%	Frank R. Wilke	509	0%
1902	Robert M. La Follette (inc)	Republican	193,417	53%	David Stuart Rose	145,818	40%
1902	Robert M. La Follette (inc)	Republican	193,417	53%	Emil Seidel	15,970	4%
1902	Robert M. La Follette (inc)	Republican	193,417	53%	Edwin W. Drake	9,647	3%
1902	Robert M. La Follette (inc)	Republican	193,417	53%	Henry E. D. Puck	791	0%
1904	Robert M. La Follette (inc)	Republican	227,253	51%	George Wilbur Peck	173,301	39%
1904	Robert M. La Follette (inc)	Republican	227,253	51%	William A. Arnold	24,857	6%
1904	Robert M. La Follette (inc)	Republican	227,253	51%	Edward Scofield	12,136	3%
1904	Robert M. La Follette (inc)	Republican	227,253	51%	William H. Clark	8,764	2%
1904	Robert M. La Follette (inc)	Republican	227,253	51%	Charles M. Minkley	249	0%
1906	James O. Davidson (inc)	Republican	183,558	57%	John A. Aylward	103,311	32%
1906	James O. Davidson (inc)	Republican	183,558	57%	Winfield R. Gaylord	24,437	8%
1906	James O. Davidson (inc)	Republican	183,558	57%	Ephraim L. Eaton	8,211	3%
1906	James O. Davidson (inc)	Republican	183,558	57%	Ole T. Rosaas	455	0%
1908	James O. Davidson (inc)	Republican	242,935	54%	John A. Aylward	165,977	37%
1908	James O. Davidson (inc)	Republican	242,935	54%	Harvey D. Brown	28,583	6%
1908	James O. Davidson (inc)	Republican	242,935	54%	Winfred D. Cox	11,760	3%
1908	James O. Davidson (inc)	Republican	242,935	54%	Herman Bottema	393	0%
1910	Francis E. McGovern	Republican	161,619	51%	Adolph H. Schmitz	110,442	35%
1910	Francis E. McGovern	Republican	161,619	51%	William A. Jacobs	39,547	12%
1910	Francis E. McGovern	Republican	161,619	51%	Byron E. Van Keuren	7,450	2%
1910	Francis E. McGovern	Republican	161,619	51%	Fred G. Kremer	430	0%
1912	Francis E. McGovern (inc)	Republican	179,360	46%	John C. Karel	167,316	42%
1912	Francis E. McGovern (inc)	Republican	179,360	46%	Carl D. Thompson	34,468	9%
1912	Francis E. McGovern (inc)	Republican	179,360	46%	Charles L. Hill	9,433	2%
1912	Francis E. McGovern (inc)	Republican	179,360	46%	William H. Curtis	3,253	1%
1914	Emanuel L. Philipp	Republican	140,787	43%	John C. Karel	119,509	37%
1914	Emanuel L. Philipp	Republican	140,787	43%	John J. Blaine	32,560	10%
1914	Emanuel L. Philipp	Republican	140,787	43%	Oscar Ameringer	25,917	8%
1914	Emanuel L. Philipp	Republican	140,787	43%	David W. Emerson	6,279	2%
1914	Emanuel L. Philipp	Republican	140,787	43%	John Vierthaler	352	0%
1916	Emanuel L. Philipp (inc)	Republican	229,889	53%	Burt Williams	164,555	38%
1916	Emanuel L. Philipp (inc)	Republican	229,889	53%	Rae Weaver	30,649	7%
1916	Emanuel L. Philipp (inc)	Republican	229,889	53%	George McKerrow	9,193	2%
1918	Emanuel L. Philipp (inc)	Republican	155,799	47%	Henry A. Moehlenpah	112,576	34%
1918	Emanuel L. Philipp (inc)	Republican	155,799	47%	Emil Seidel	57,523	17%
1918	Emanuel L. Philipp (inc)	Republican	155,799	47%	William C. Dean	5,296	2%
1920	John J. Blaine	Republican	366,247	53%	Robert Bruce McCoy	247,746	36%
1920	John J. Blaine	Republican	366,247	53%	William Coleman	71,126	10%
1920	John J. Blaine	Republican	366,247	53%	Henry H. Tubbs	6,047	1%
1922	John J. Blaine (inc)	Republican	367,929	76%	Arthur A. Bentley	51,061	11%
1922	John J. Blaine (inc)	Republican	367,929	76%	Louis A. Arnold	39,570	8%
1922	John J. Blaine (inc)	Republican	367,929	76%	M. L. Welles	21,438	4%
1922	John J. Blaine (inc)	Republican	367,929	76%	Arthur A. Dietrich	1,444	0%
1924	John J. Blaine (inc)	Republican	412,255	52%	Martin L. Lueck	317,550	40%
1924	John J. Blaine (inc)	Republican	412,255	52%	William F. Quick	45,268	6%
1924	John J. Blaine (inc)	Republican	412,255	52%	Adolph R. Bucknam	11,516	1%
1924	John J. Blaine (inc)	Republican	412,255	52%	Severi Alanne	4,107	0%
1924	John J. Blaine (inc)	Republican	412,255	52%	Farrand K. Shuttleworth	4,079	0%
1924	John J. Blaine (inc)	Republican	412,255	52%	Jose Snover	1,452	0%
1926	Fred R. Zimmerman	Republican	350,927	63%	Charles B. Perry	76,507	14%
1926	Fred R. Zimmerman	Republican	350,927	63%	Virgil H. Cady	72,627	13%
1926	Fred R. Zimmerman	Republican	350,927	63%	Herman O. Kent	40,293	7%
1926	Fred R. Zimmerman	Republican	350,927	63%	David W. Emerson	7,333	1%
1926	Fred R. Zimmerman	Republican	350,927	63%	Alex Gorden	4,593	1%
1928	Walter J. Kohler Sr.	Republican	547,738	55%	Albert G. Schmedeman	394,368	40%
1928	Walter J. Kohler Sr.	Republican	547,738	55%	Otto R. Hauser	36,924	4%
1928	Walter J. Kohler Sr.	Republican	547,738	55%	Adolph R. Bucknam	6,477	1%
1928	Walter J. Kohler Sr.	Republican	547,738	55%	Joseph Ehrhardt	1,938	0%
1928	Walter J. Kohler Sr.	Republican	547,738	55%	Alvar J. Hayes	1,420	0%
1930	Philip La Follette	Republican	392,958	65%	Charles E. Hammersley	170,020	28%
1930	Philip La Follette	Republican	392,958	65%	Frank Metcalfe	25,607	4%
1930	Philip La Follette	Republican	392,958	65%	Alfred B. Taynton	14,818	2%
1930	Philip La Follette	Republican	392,958	65%	Fred Basset Blair	2,998	0%
1932	Albert G. Schmedeman	Democratic	590,114	52%	Walter J. Kohler Sr.	470,805	42%
1932	Albert G. Schmedeman	Democratic	590,114	52%	Frank Metcalfe	56,965	5%
1932	Albert G. Schmedeman	Democratic	590,114	52%	William C. Dean	3,148	0%
1932	Albert G. Schmedeman	Democratic	590,114	52%	Fred Basset Blair	2,926	0%
1932	Albert G. Schmedeman	Democratic	590,114	52%	Joseph Ehrhardt	398	0%
1934	Philip La Follette	Progressive	373,093	39%	Albert G. Schmedeman (inc)	359,467	38%
1934	Philip La Follette	Progressive	373,093	39%	Howard Greene	172,980	18%
1934	Philip La Follette	Progressive	373,093	39%	George A. Nelson	44,589	5%
1934	Philip La Follette	Progressive	373,093	39%	Morris Childs	2,454	0%
1934	Philip La Follette	Progressive	373,093	39%	Thomas W. North	857	0%
1934	Philip La Follette	Progressive	373,093	39%	Joseph Ehrhardt	332	0%
1936	Philip La Follette (inc)	Progressive	573,724	46%	Alexander Wiley	363,973	29%
1936	Philip La Follette (inc)	Progressive	573,724	46%	Arthur W. Lueck	268,530	22%
1936	Philip La Follette (inc)	Progressive	573,724	46%	Joseph F. Walsh	27,934	2%
1936	Philip La Follette (inc)	Progressive	573,724	46%	Joseph Ehrhardt	1,738	0%
1936	Philip La Follette (inc)	Progressive	573,724	46%	August F. Fehlandt	1,008	0%
1938	Julius P. Heil	Republican	543,675	55%	Philip La Follette (inc)	353,381	36%
1938	Julius P. Heil	Republican	543,675	55%	Harry W. Bolens	78,446	8%
1938	Julius P. Heil	Republican	543,675	55%	Frank W. Smith	4,564	0%
1938	Julius P. Heil	Republican	543,675	55%	John Schleier Jr.	1,459	0%
1940	Julius P. Heil (inc)	Republican	558,678	41%	Orland Steen Loomis	546,436	40%
1940	Julius P. Heil (inc)	Republican	558,678	41%	Francis E. McGovern	264,985	19%
1940	Julius P. Heil (inc)	Republican	558,678	41%	Fred Basset Blair	2,340	0%
1940	Julius P. Heil (inc)	Republican	558,678	41%	Louis Fisher	1,158	0%
1942	Orland Steen Loomis	Progressive	397,664	50%	Julius P. Heil (inc)	291,945	36%
1942	Orland Steen Loomis	Progressive	397,664	50%	William C. Sullivan	98,153	12%
1942	Orland Steen Loomis	Progressive	397,664	50%	Frank Zeidler	11,295	1%
1942	Orland Steen Loomis	Progressive	397,664	50%	Fred Basset Blair	1,092	0%
1942	Orland Steen Loomis	Progressive	397,664	50%	Georgia Cozzini	480	0%
1944	Walter Samuel Goodland (inc)	Republican	697,740	53%	Daniel Hoan	536,357	41%
1944	Walter Samuel Goodland (inc)	Republican	697,740	53%	Alexander O. Benz	76,028	6%
1944	Walter Samuel Goodland (inc)	Republican	697,740	53%	George A. Nelson	9,183	1%
1944	Walter Samuel Goodland (inc)	Republican	697,740	53%	Georgia Cozzini	1,122	0%
1946	Walter Samuel Goodland (inc)	Republican	621,970	60%	Daniel Hoan	406,499	39%
1946	Walter Samuel Goodland (inc)	Republican	621,970	60%	Walter H. Uphoff	8,996	1%
1946	Walter Samuel Goodland (inc)	Republican	621,970	60%	Sigmund G. Eisenscher	1,857	0%
1946	Walter Samuel Goodland (inc)	Republican	621,970	60%	Jerry R. Kenyon	959	0%
1948	Oscar Rennebohm (inc)	Republican	684,839	54%	Carl W. Thompson	558,497	44%
1948	Oscar Rennebohm (inc)	Republican	684,839	54%	Henry J. Berquist	12,928	1%
1948	Oscar Rennebohm (inc)	Republican	684,839	54%	Walter H. Uphoff	9,149	1%
1948	Oscar Rennebohm (inc)	Republican	684,839	54%	James E. Boulton	356	0%
1948	Oscar Rennebohm (inc)	Republican	684,839	54%	Georgia Cozzini	328	0%
1950	Walter J. Kohler Jr.	Republican	605,649	53%	Carl W. Thompson	525,319	46%
1950	Walter J. Kohler Jr.	Republican	605,649	53%	M. Michael Essin	3,735	0%
1950	Walter J. Kohler Jr.	Republican	605,649	53%	William O. Hart	3,384	0%
1952	Walter J. Kohler Jr. (inc)	Republican	1,009,171	62%	William Proxmire	601,844	37%
1952	Walter J. Kohler Jr. (inc)	Republican	1,009,171	62%	M. Michael Essin	3,706	0%
1954	Walter J. Kohler Jr. (inc)	Republican	596,158	51%	William Proxmire	560,747	48%
1954	Walter J. Kohler Jr. (inc)	Republican	596,158	51%	Arthur Wepfer	1,722	0%
1956	Vernon W. Thomson	Republican	808,273	52%	William Proxmire	749,421	48%
1958	Gaylord Nelson	Democratic	644,296	54%	Vernon W. Thomson (inc)	556,391	46%
1958	Gaylord Nelson	Democratic	644,296	54%	Wayne Leverenz	1,485	0%
1960	Gaylord Nelson (inc)	Democratic	890,868	52%	Phillip G. Kuehn	837,123	48%
1962	John W. Reynolds Jr.	Democratic	637,491	50%	Phillip G. Kuehn	625,536	49%
1962	John W. Reynolds Jr.	Democratic	637,491	50%	Adolf Wiggert	2,477	0%
1964	Warren P. Knowles	Republican	856,779	51%	John W. Reynolds Jr. (inc)	837,901	49%
1966	Warren P. Knowles (inc)	Republican	626,041	54%	Patrick Lucey	539,258	46%
1966	Warren P. Knowles (inc)	Republican	626,041	54%	Adolf Wiggert	4,745	0%
1968	Warren P. Knowles (inc)	Republican	893,463	53%	Bronson La Follette	791,100	47%
1968	Warren P. Knowles (inc)	Republican	893,463	53%	Adolf Wiggert	3,225	0%
1968	Warren P. Knowles (inc)	Republican	893,463	53%	Robert Wilkinson	1,813	0%
1970	Patrick Lucey	Democratic	728,403	54%	Jack B. Olson	602,617	45%
1970	Patrick Lucey	Democratic	728,403	54%	Leo James McDonald	9,035	1%
1970	Patrick Lucey	Democratic	728,403	54%	Georgia Cozzini	1,287	0%
1970	Patrick Lucey	Democratic	728,403	54%	Samuel K. Hunt	888	0%
1970	Patrick Lucey	Democratic	728,403	54%	Myrtle Kastner	628	0%
1974	Patrick Lucey (inc)	Democratic	628,639	53%	William Dyke	497,189	42%
1974	Patrick Lucey (inc)	Democratic	628,639	53%	William H. Upham	33,528	3%
1974	Patrick Lucey (inc)	Democratic	628,639	53%	Crazy Jim	12,107	1%
1974	Patrick Lucey (inc)	Democratic	628,639	53%	William Hart	5,113	0%
1974	Patrick Lucey (inc)	Democratic	628,639	53%	Fred Basset Blair	3,617	0%
1974	Patrick Lucey (inc)	Democratic	628,639	53%	Georgia Cozzini	1,492	0%
1978	Lee S. Dreyfus	Republican	816,056	54%	Martin J. Schreiber (inc)	673,813	45%
1978	Lee S. Dreyfus	Republican	816,056	54%	Eugene R. Zimmerman	6,355	0%
1978	Lee S. Dreyfus	Republican	816,056	54%	John C. Doherty	2,183	0%
1978	Lee S. Dreyfus	Republican	816,056	54%	Adrienne Kaplan	1,548	0%
1978	Lee S. Dreyfus	Republican	816,056	54%	Henry A. Ochsner	849	0%
1982	Tony Earl	Democratic	896,872	57%	Terry Kohler	662,738	42%
1982	Tony Earl	Democratic	896,872	57%	Larry Smiley	9,734	1%
1982	Tony Earl	Democratic	896,872	57%	James Wickstrom	7,721	0%
1982	Tony Earl	Democratic	896,872	57%	Peter Seidman	3,025	0%
1986	Tommy Thompson	Republican	805,090	53%	Tony Earl (inc)	705,578	46%
1986	Tommy Thompson	Republican	805,090	53%	Kathryn A. Christensen	10,323	1%
1986	Tommy Thompson	Republican	805,090	53%	Darold E. Wall	3,913	0%
1986	Tommy Thompson	Republican	805,090	53%	Sanford Knapp	1,668	0%
1990	Tommy Thompson (inc)	Republican	802,321	58%	Thomas A. Loftus	576,280	42%
1994	Tommy Thompson (inc)	Republican	1,051,326	67%	Charles Chvala	482,850	31%
1994	Tommy Thompson (inc)	Republican	1,051,326	67%	David S. Harmon	11,639	1%
1994	Tommy Thompson (inc)	Republican	1,051,326	67%	Edward J. Frami	9,188	1%
1994	Tommy Thompson (inc)	Republican	1,051,326	67%	Michael J. Mangan	8,150	1%
1998	Tommy Thompson (inc)	Republican	1,047,716	60%	Ed Garvey	679,553	39%
1998	Tommy Thompson (inc)	Republican	1,047,716	60%	Jim Mueller	11,071	1%
1998	Tommy Thompson (inc)	Republican	1,047,716	60%	Edward J. Frami	10,269	1%
1998	Tommy Thompson (inc)	Republican	1,047,716	60%	Michael J. Mangan	4,985	0%
1998	Tommy Thompson (inc)	Republican	1,047,716	60%	A-Ja-mu Muhammad	1,604	0%
1998	Tommy Thompson (inc)	Republican	1,047,716	60%	Jeffrey L. Smith	14	0%
2002	Jim Doyle	Democratic	800,515	45%	Scott McCallum (inc)	734,779	41%
2002	Jim Doyle	Democratic	800,515	45%	Ed Thompson	185,455	10%
2002	Jim Doyle	Democratic	800,515	45%	Jim Young	44,111	2%
2002	Jim Doyle	Democratic	800,515	45%	Alan D. Eisenberg	2,847	0%
2002	Jim Doyle	Democratic	800,515	45%	Ty A. Bollerud	2,637	0%
2002	Jim Doyle	Democratic	800,515	45%	Michael J. Mangan	1,710	0%
2002	Jim Doyle	Democratic	800,515	45%	Aneb Jah Rasta Sensa-Utcha Nefer-I	929	0%
2006	Jim Doyle (inc)	Democratic	1,139,115	53%	Mark Andrew Green	979,427	45%
2006	Jim Doyle (inc)	Democratic	1,139,115	53%	Nelson Eisman	40,709	2%
2010	Scott Walker	Republican	1,128,941	52%	Tom Barrett	1,004,303	46%
2010	Scott Walker	Republican	1,128,941	52%	Jim Langer	10,608	0%
2010	Scott Walker	Republican	1,128,941	52%	James James	8,273	0%
2012^	Scott Walker (inc)	Republican	1,335,585	53%	Tom Barrett	1,164,480	46%
2012^	Scott Walker (inc)	Republican	1,335,585	53%	Hari Trivedi	14,463	1%
2014	Scott Walker (inc)	Republican	1,259,706	52%	Mary Burke	1,122,913	47%
2014	Scott Walker (inc)	Republican	1,259,706	52%	Robert Burke	18,720	1%
2014	Scott Walker (inc)	Republican	1,259,706	52%	Dennis Fehr	7,530	1%
2018	Tony Evers	Democratic	1,324,307	50%	Scott Walker (inc)	1,295,080	48%
2018	Tony Evers	Democratic	1,324,307	50%	Phil Anderson	20,255	1%
2018	Tony Evers	Democratic	1,324,307	50%	Maggie Turnbull	18,884	1%
2018	Tony Evers	Democratic	1,324,307	50%	Michael White	11,087	0%
2018	Tony Evers	Democratic	1,324,307	50%	Arnie Enz	2,745	0%
2022	Tony Evers (inc)	Democratic	1,358,774	51%	Tim Michels	1,268,535	47%
2022	Tony Evers (inc)	Democratic	1,358,774	51%	Joan Ellis Beglinger	27,198	1%
2026	David Crowley	Democratic	1,440,990	54%	Tom Tiffany	1,227,674	46%

^ Recall election
