= 1884 Wisconsin gubernatorial election =

- November 4, 1884
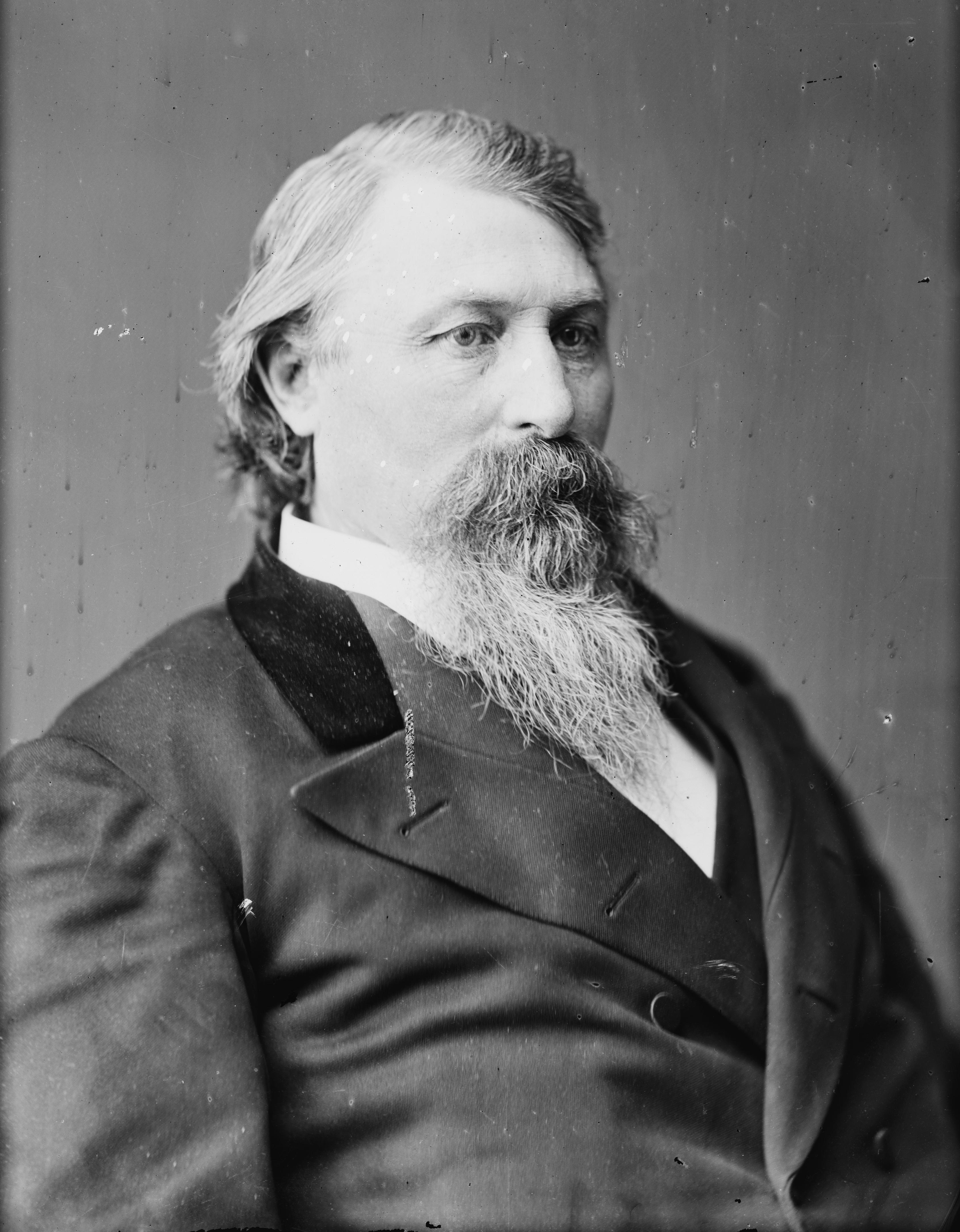

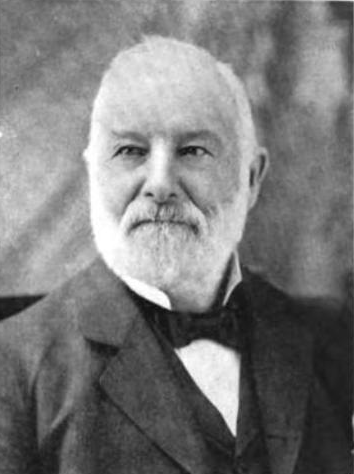
Nominee	Jeremiah McLain Rusk	Nicholas D. Fratt
Party	Republican	Democratic
Popular vote	163,214	143,945
Percentage	51.00%	44.98%
- County results Rusk : 40–50% 50–60% 60–70% 70–80% >90% Fratt : 40–50% 50–60% 60–70% 70–80%
Governor before election
Jeremiah McLain Rusk
Republican
Elected Governor
Jeremiah McLain Rusk
Republican

The 1884 Wisconsin gubernatorial election was held on November 4, 1884.

Republican nominee Jeremiah McLain Rusk defeated Democratic nominee Nicholas D. Fratt and two other nominees with 51.00% of the vote.

This was the first Wisconsin gubernatorial election held in an even-numbered year. In 1882, a constitutional amendment was carried moving gubernatorial elections from odd-numbered to even-numbered years.

== General election ==
=== Candidates ===
Major party candidates

- Nicholas D. Fratt, Democratic, President of the Racine County Bank, Democratic nominee for Governor of Wisconsin in 1881
- Jeremiah McLain Rusk, Republican, incumbent Governor

Other candidates

- Samuel D. Hastings, Prohibition, former State Treasurer, Prohibition nominee for Wisconsin's 3rd congressional district in 1882
- William L. Utley, Greenback, former State Senator

=== Results ===
1884 Wisconsin gubernatorial election
Party	Candidate	Votes	%	±%
Republican	Jeremiah M. Rusk (incumbent)	163,214	51.00%	+3.43%
Democratic	Nicholas D. Fratt	143,945	44.98%	+4.37%
Prohibition	Samuel D. Hastings	8,545	2.67%	−5.03%
Greenback	William L. Utley	4,274	1.34%	−2.74%
	Scattering	19	0.01%	
Majority		19,269	6.02%	
Total votes		319,997	100.00%	
Republican hold		Swing	-0.94%	

=== Results by county ===
County	Jeremiah M. Rusk Republican		Nicholas D. Fratt Democratic		Samuel D. Hastings Prohibition		William L. Utley Greenback		Scattering Write-in		Margin		Total votes cast
County	#	%	#	%	#	%	#	%	#	%	#	%	Total votes cast
Adams	1,017	68.81%	445	30.11%	9	0.61%	5	0.34%	2	0.14%	572	38.70%	1,478
Ashland	1,107	62.23%	654	36.76%	17	0.96%	0	0.00%	1	0.06%	453	25.46%	1,779
Barron	1,714	66.64%	780	30.33%	66	2.57%	11	0.43%	1	0.04%	934	36.31%	2,572
Bayfield	438	64.89%	236	34.96%	1	0.15%	0	0.00%	0	0.00%	202	29.93%	675
Brown	2,950	43.99%	3,638	54.25%	86	1.28%	32	0.48%	0	0.00%	-688	-10.26%	6,706
Buffalo	1,709	60.93%	1,072	38.22%	2	0.07%	22	0.78%	0	0.00%	637	22.71%	2,805
Burnett	601	94.65%	27	4.25%	1	0.16%	6	0.94%	0	0.00%	574	90.39%	635
Calumet	1,042	31.74%	2,057	62.66%	50	1.52%	134	4.08%	0	0.00%	-1,015	-30.92%	3,283
Chippewa	2,550	49.54%	2,503	48.63%	41	0.80%	53	1.03%	0	0.00%	47	0.91%	5,147
Clark	2,000	59.52%	1,208	35.95%	56	1.67%	96	2.86%	0	0.00%	792	23.57%	3,360
Columbia	3,479	54.61%	2,623	41.17%	265	4.16%	4	0.06%	0	0.00%	856	13.44%	6,371
Crawford	1,556	48.22%	1,594	49.40%	40	1.24%	37	1.15%	0	0.00%	-38	-1.18%	3,227
Dane	6,390	48.20%	6,229	46.99%	617	4.65%	21	0.16%	0	0.00%	161	1.21%	13,257
Dodge	3,160	33.26%	6,121	64.43%	101	1.06%	118	1.24%	0	0.00%	-2,961	-31.17%	9,500
Door	1,830	59.86%	1,111	36.34%	61	2.00%	55	1.80%	0	0.00%	719	23.52%	3,057
Douglas	279	53.14%	245	46.67%	1	0.19%	0	0.00%	0	0.00%	34	6.48%	525
Dunn	2,539	65.62%	1,199	30.99%	60	1.55%	71	1.84%	0	0.00%	1,340	34.63%	3,869
Eau Claire	3,644	53.73%	2,917	43.01%	161	2.37%	59	0.87%	1	0.01%	727	10.72%	6,782
Florence	361	70.92%	142	27.90%	6	1.18%	0	0.00%	0	0.00%	219	43.03%	509
Fond du Lac	4,281	44.35%	4,857	50.32%	241	2.50%	274	2.84%	0	0.00%	-576	-5.97%	9,653
Grant	4,149	52.87%	3,210	40.91%	387	4.93%	101	1.29%	0	0.00%	939	11.97%	7,847
Green	2,568	50.51%	1,865	36.68%	384	7.55%	265	5.21%	2	0.04%	703	13.83%	5,084
Green Lake	1,522	51.06%	1,295	43.44%	158	5.30%	6	0.20%	0	0.00%	227	7.61%	2,981
Iowa	2,460	47.76%	2,292	44.50%	396	7.69%	2	0.04%	1	0.02%	168	3.26%	5,151
Jackson	2,058	65.21%	961	30.45%	66	2.09%	70	2.22%	1	0.03%	1,097	34.76%	3,156
Jefferson	2,919	39.63%	4,210	57.16%	231	3.14%	5	0.07%	0	0.00%	-1,291	-17.53%	7,365
Juneau	2,011	51.91%	1,709	44.11%	134	3.46%	19	0.49%	1	0.03%	302	7.80%	3,874
Kenosha	1,715	52.03%	1,545	46.88%	36	1.09%	0	0.00%	0	0.00%	170	5.16%	3,296
Kewaunee	749	27.12%	2,003	72.52%	10	0.36%	0	0.00%	0	0.00%	-1,254	-45.40%	2,762
La Crosse	3,787	51.41%	3,430	46.57%	136	1.85%	13	0.18%	0	0.00%	357	4.85%	7,366
Lafayette	2,480	49.92%	2,208	44.44%	242	4.87%	38	0.76%	0	0.00%	272	5.48%	4,968
Langlade	557	44.96%	628	50.69%	27	2.18%	27	2.18%	0	0.00%	-71	-5.73%	1,239
Lincoln	1,081	51.26%	994	47.13%	13	0.62%	21	1.00%	0	0.00%	87	4.13%	2,109
Manitowoc	2,615	38.58%	4,126	60.86%	37	0.55%	1	0.01%	0	0.00%	-1,511	-22.29%	6,779
Marathon	2,170	38.83%	3,330	59.58%	26	0.47%	63	1.13%	0	0.00%	-1,160	-20.76%	5,589
Marinette	2,043	66.87%	909	29.75%	103	3.37%	0	0.00%	0	0.00%	1,134	37.12%	3,055
Marquette	943	45.64%	1,079	52.23%	37	1.79%	7	0.34%	0	0.00%	-136	-6.58%	2,066
Milwaukee	17,876	52.16%	15,235	44.46%	274	0.80%	883	2.58%	2	0.01%	2,641	7.71%	34,270
Monroe	2,649	52.62%	2,177	43.25%	143	2.84%	64	1.27%	1	0.02%	472	9.38%	5,034
Oconto	1,496	57.85%	1,031	39.87%	57	2.20%	2	0.08%	0	0.00%	465	17.98%	2,586
Outagamie	2,630	37.16%	4,182	59.08%	85	1.20%	181	2.56%	0	0.00%	-1,552	-21.93%	7,078
Ozaukee	784	26.92%	2,103	72.22%	5	0.17%	20	0.69%	0	0.00%	-1,319	-45.30%	2,912
Pepin	985	70.36%	378	27.00%	28	2.00%	9	0.64%	0	0.00%	607	43.36%	1,400
Pierce	2,479	65.22%	1,117	29.39%	174	4.58%	31	0.82%	0	0.00%	1,362	35.83%	3,801
Polk	1,757	72.01%	591	24.22%	91	3.73%	0	0.00%	1	0.04%	1,166	47.79%	2,440
Portage	2,328	49.50%	2,248	47.80%	83	1.76%	44	0.94%	0	0.00%	80	1.70%	4,703
Price	796	70.69%	328	29.13%	2	0.18%	0	0.00%	0	0.00%	468	41.56%	1,126
Racine	4,001	51.03%	3,496	44.59%	317	4.04%	26	0.33%	0	0.00%	505	6.44%	7,840
Richland	2,464	54.71%	1,787	39.68%	216	4.80%	37	0.82%	0	0.00%	677	15.03%	4,504
Rock	6,262	61.57%	3,381	33.24%	474	4.66%	53	0.52%	0	0.00%	2,881	28.33%	10,170
Sauk	3,531	56.48%	2,325	37.19%	327	5.23%	68	1.09%	1	0.02%	1,206	19.29%	6,252
Sawyer	286	69.59%	121	29.44%	4	0.97%	0	0.00%	0	0.00%	165	40.15%	411
Shawano	1,405	47.98%	1,402	47.88%	42	1.43%	79	2.70%	0	0.00%	3	0.10%	2,928
Sheboygan	3,528	45.17%	3,975	50.90%	77	0.99%	230	2.94%	0	0.00%	-447	-5.72%	7,810
St. Croix	2,508	51.60%	2,239	46.07%	110	2.26%	2	0.04%	1	0.02%	269	5.53%	4,860
Taylor	796	56.94%	601	42.99%	1	0.07%	0	0.00%	0	0.00%	195	13.95%	1,398
Trempealeau	2,289	62.42%	1,183	32.26%	98	2.67%	97	2.65%	0	0.00%	1,106	30.16%	3,667
Vernon	3,019	62.39%	1,445	29.86%	211	4.36%	161	3.33%	3	0.06%	1,574	32.53%	4,839
Walworth	4,233	62.19%	2,071	30.42%	484	7.11%	19	0.28%	0	0.00%	2,162	31.76%	6,807
Washburn	281	60.43%	137	29.46%	47	10.11%	0	0.00%	0	0.00%	144	30.97%	465
Washington	1,661	36.01%	2,911	63.10%	19	0.41%	22	0.48%	0	0.00%	-1,250	-27.10%	4,613
Waukesha	3,188	46.87%	3,263	47.97%	287	4.22%	64	0.94%	0	0.00%	-75	-1.10%	6,802
Waupaca	3,014	59.59%	1,760	34.80%	124	2.45%	160	3.16%	0	0.00%	1,254	24.79%	5,058
Waushara	2,141	74.57%	605	21.07%	92	3.20%	33	1.15%	0	0.00%	1,536	53.50%	2,871
Winnebago	4,885	47.83%	4,678	45.80%	361	3.53%	289	2.83%	0	0.00%	207	2.03%	10,213
Wood	1,468	45.00%	1,723	52.82%	7	0.21%	64	1.96%	0	0.00%	-255	-7.82%	3,262
Total	163,214	51.00%	143,945	44.98%	8,545	2.67%	4,274	1.34%	19	0.01%	19,269	6.02%	319,997

==== Counties that flipped from Democratic to Republican ====
- Chippewa
- Dane
- Douglas
- Eau Claire
- Iowa
- St. Croix

==== Counties that flipped from Republican to Democratic ====
- Crawford
- Langlade

== Bibliography ==
- Glashan, Roy R. (1979). American Governors and Gubernatorial Elections, 1775-1978. Meckler Books. ISBN 0-930466-17-9.
- Gubernatorial Elections, 1787-1997. Washington, D.C.: Congressional Quarterly Inc. 1998. ISBN 1-56802-396-0.
