= Nicholas D. Fratt =

19th century American businessman and politician

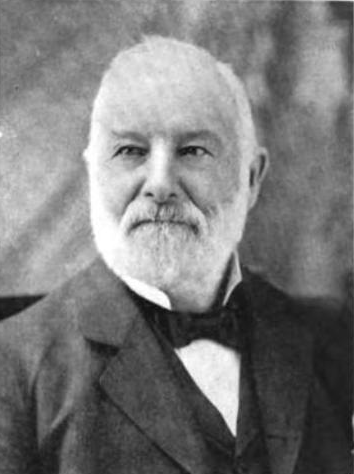

Member of the Wisconsin Senate from the 7th district
- In office January 1, 1859 – January 1, 1861
- Preceded by: Champion S. Chase
- Succeeded by: William L. Utley

Personal details
- Born: January 25, 1825 Watervliet, New York, U.S.
- Died: November 12, 1910 (aged 85) Redlands, California, U.S.
- Resting place: Mound Cemetery, Racine, Wisconsin
- Party: Democratic
- Spouses: Elsie Duffes (m. 1846; died 1890); Eva June Jeardeau (m. 1893–1910)
- Children: Mary J. (Webster)^{(b. 1846; died 1920)}; Alfred K. Fratt^{(b. 1848; died 1853)}; Gertrude Jane (Mellen)^{(b. 1849; died 1888)}; Franklin E. Fratt^{(b. 1852; died 1858)}; George N. Fratt^{(b. 1855; died 1927)}; Susan Clara (Griffith)^{(b. 1857; died 1936)}; Frederick William Fratt^{(b. 1859; died 1942)}; Charles Diller Fratt^{(b. 1862; died 1928)}
- Occupation: Businessman, banker

Nicholas Diller Fratt (January 25, 1825 – November 12, 1910) was an American businessman, Democratic politician, and Wisconsin pioneer. He was president of the Racine County Bank for fifty years. He also served two years in the Wisconsin Senate (1859, 1860) and was an unsuccessful candidate for the United States House of Representatives and Governor of Wisconsin. He is the namesake of Fratt Elementary School in Racine, Wisconsin.

== Biography ==
Nicholas D. Fratt was born January 25, 1825, in the town of Watervliet, in Albany County, New York. As a young man, he worked for his father in the provision and packing business. At age 18, in 1843, he moved to Racine, in the Wisconsin Territory, and was employed at a packing house. In 1844, he went into business with Charles Herrick and opened a meat market and packing business. Two years later, his brother, Francis, arrived from New York and took the place of Herrick as his partner in the business. The company thrived and was his primary employment for the next fourteen years.

In 1853, Fratt was one of the founders of the Racine County Bank, and would serve as President of the bank from 1859 to 1908. The bank became First National Bank & Trust Co. of Racine, and, in 1988, it was absorbed into Bank One Corporation.

In 1855, Fratt bought a farm west of Racine. The land was later annexed into the city of Racine and became the neighborhood known as "West Racine". Fratt lived on his farm until 1894, when he moved into the city and bought a home on College Avenue.

He was elected to the Wisconsin State Senate in 1858 and served in the 12th and 13th sessions of the Wisconsin Legislature (1859 and 1860).

In 1874, he was the Democratic candidate for the United States House of Representatives for Wisconsin's 1st congressional district, losing to incumbent Charles G. Williams.

Fratt ran for Governor of Wisconsin twice, in 1881 and 1884. In both elections he was defeated by Republican Jeremiah McLain Rusk.

After retiring from the bank, about 1900, he moved west to Redlands, California.

== Personal life ==
Nicholas Diller Fratt was one of seven children born to Catherine (née Miller) and Jacob Fratt. Nicholas's younger sister, Julia, married Enoch Strother, who went on to become a prominent politician in Nevada; he was a one-time Republican nominee for governor of Nevada and chairman of the Nevada Republican Party.

Nicholas Fratt married Elsie Duffes in Racine on January 14, 1846. Duffes had been born near Aberdeen, Scotland, and immigrated with her parents, in 1835, first to Canada, then to Illinois, and, in 1840, to Racine County. Nicholas and Elsie had eight children, but two children died in childhood, leaving three sons and three daughters. His wife, Elsie, died in 1890, leaving Fratt a widower. He remarried on February 23, 1893, to Eva June Jeardeau of Grant County, Wisconsin. There were no children from his second marriage.

Nicholas Fratt died in 1910, at his home in Redlands, California. He bequeathed land from his farm to the school district, on which the first school in West Racine was built. The school opened in 1916 and continues to operate as Fratt Elementary School in the Racine Unified School District.

== Electoral history ==
=== U.S. House of Representatives (1874) ===
Wisconsin's 1st Congressional District Election, 1874
Party	Candidate	Votes	%	±%
General Election, November 3, 1874
Republican	Charles G. Williams	12,568	56.87%	−5.68%
Democratic	Nicholas D. Fratt	9,532	43.13%	
Total votes		22,100	100.0%	-11.76%
Republican hold				

=== Wisconsin Governor (1881, 1884) ===
Wisconsin Gubernatorial Election, 1881
Party	Candidate	Votes	%	±%
General Election, November 8, 1881
Republican	Jeremiah McLain Rusk	81,754	47.57%	−5.62%
Democratic	Nicholas D. Fratt	69,797	40.61%	+0.92%
Prohibition	Theodore D. Kanouse	13,225	7.70%	
Greenback	Edward P. Allis	7,002	4.07%	−2.80%
	Scattering	78	0.05%	
Total votes		171,856	100.0%	-9.07%
Republican hold				

Wisconsin Gubernatorial Election, 1884
Party	Candidate	Votes	%	±%
General Election, November 4, 1884
Republican	Jeremiah McLain Rusk	163,214	51.00%	+3.43%
Democratic	Nicholas D. Fratt	143,945	44.98%	+4.37%
Prohibition	Samuel D. Hastings	8,545	2.67%	−5.03%
Greenback	William L. Utley	4,274	1.34%	−2.74%
	Scattering	19	0.01%	
Total votes		319,997	100.0%	+86.20%
Republican hold				

Party political offices
Preceded by James Graham Jenkins	Democratic nominee for Governor of Wisconsin; 1881, 1884	Succeeded by Gilbert M. Woodward
Wisconsin Senate
Preceded by Champion S. Chase	Member of the Wisconsin Senate from the 7th district January 1859 – January 1861	Succeeded by William L. Utley
