= William L. Utley =

American politician and Army colonel

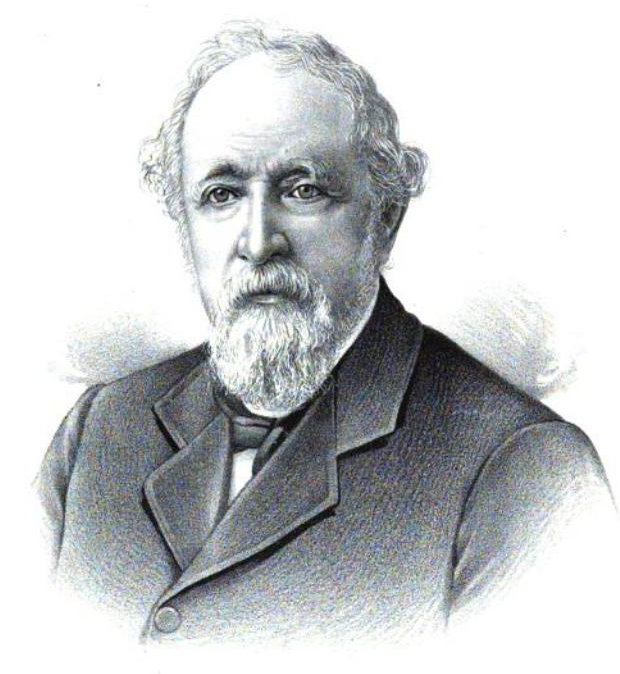

3rd & 7th Adjutant General of Wisconsin
- In office April 25, 1861 – January 7, 1862
- Appointed by: Alexander Randall
- Preceded by: James A. Swain
- Succeeded by: Augustus Gaylord
- In office April 1, 1852 – April 1, 1854
- Appointed by: Leonard J. Farwell
- Preceded by: William A. Barstow
- Succeeded by: John McManman

Member of the Wisconsin Senate from the 7th district
- In office January 9, 1861 – January 4, 1863
- Preceded by: Nicholas D. Fratt
- Succeeded by: Timothy D. Morris

Member of the Wisconsin State Assembly from the Racine 1st district
- In office January 8, 1851 – January 12, 1853
- Preceded by: Horace N. Chapman
- Succeeded by: Horace T. Sanders

Personal details
- Born: July 10, 1814 Monson, Massachusetts, US
- Died: March 4, 1887 (aged 72) Racine, Wisconsin, US
- Resting place: Mound Cemetery, Racine
- Party: Greenback Party; Republican (1854–1878); Free Soil (1848–1854); Democratic (before 1848)
- Spouses: Louisa Maria Wing (m. 1839; died 1864); Sarah Jane French (Wooster) (m. 1866; died 1882)
- Children: 5 with Louisa Wing; 1 with Sarah French
- Parents: Hamilton Utley (father); Polly (Squire) Utley (mother)
- Nickname: "The Abolition Colonel"

Military service
- Allegiance: United States
- Branch/service: United States Volunteers; Union Army
- Years of service: 1862–1864
- Rank: Colonel, USV
- Commands: Adjutant General of the Wisconsin Militia; 22nd Reg. Wis. Vol. Infantry
- Battles/wars: American Civil War: Middle Tennessee Operations; Battle of Thompson's Station; Atlanta campaign; Battle of Resaca; Battle of Adairsville; Battle of New Hope Church; Battle of Dallas; Battle of Kennesaw Mountain

William Lawrence Utley Sr. (July 10, 1814 – March 4, 1887) was an American portrait artist, hotel keeper, politician, newspaper editor, and Wisconsin pioneer. He was the 3rd and 7th adjutant general of Wisconsin, and served as a Union Army colonel through most of the American Civil War. One of the major Union Army mustering grounds in Wisconsin was named "Camp Utley", for him.

He also served in the Wisconsin Senate (1861 & 1862) and state Assembly (1851 & 1852), representing Racine County. Initially affiliated with the Democratic Party, he became a member of the Free Soil Party over the issue of slavery in 1848. He then joined the Republican Party when that party was organized in 1854, then later joined the Greenback Party in 1878, running as a Greenback candidate for U.S. House in 1882 and governor in 1884.

== Early life ==
Utley was born in Monson, Massachusetts, to Hamilton and Polly Utley. At age four, his father moved the family to Newbury Center, Ohio, about twenty miles east of Cleveland. He was educated by his father and then moved to New York to further his studies as a portrait painter. Utley was also an amateur violinist and played music for his uncle's dance classes while in New York.

== Early career in Wisconsin ==
Utley moved to Racine, in the Wisconsin Territory, in 1844. He was employed as a portrait artist in Racine and also taught dancing lessons. He also became proprietor of the Racine House—the first large hotel in the area.

He became associated with the newly organized Free Soil Party in 1848, along with a large portion of the population of Racine County. In 1850, was elected on the Free Soil ticket to the Wisconsin State Assembly from Racine's 1st district. He was re-elected in 1851.

In 1852, he was appointed Adjutant General of the Wisconsin Militia by Governor Leonard J. Farwell. When the Republican Party of Wisconsin became organized in 1854, Utley became a member.

He was elected to a two-year term in the Wisconsin State Senate from the 7th District (Racine County) in 1860, where he served on the Committee for the Militia.

== Civil War service ==
After the outbreak of the American Civil War, in 1861, Utley was again appointed Adjutant General of the Wisconsin Militia, this time by Governor Alexander Randall. Utley took the lead in organizing Wisconsin's volunteer regiments for the Union cause. Over the course of six months, he had helped raise nearly 30,000 soldiers and received a complimentary letter from President Abraham Lincoln for his efforts.

In January 1862, Louis P. Harvey took over as Governor and Utley resumed his work in the Senate. But before the end of the year, Governor Harvey was dead and Governor Edward Salomon commissioned Utley as a Colonel and ordered him to raise a regiment for service in the Union Army.

Camp Utley was created out of a 75-acre lot between 16th Street and College Avenue in Racine, Wisconsin, and Utley recruited and trained men from Racine, Rock, Green, and Walworth counties. The 22nd Wisconsin Volunteer Infantry mustered into service September 2, 1862, under Colonel Utley and Lt. Colonel Edward Bloodgood. On September 22, they marched out with orders to proceed to Cincinnati and join the Army of Kentucky in blunting the Confederate Heartland Offensive.

=== Fugitive slave incident ===
The 22nd encountered a number of escaped slaves in Kentucky. Kentucky was a slave state but still fought on the side of the Union in the Civil War, thus Union forces were ordered to return escaped slaves to their owners. Utley refused the order and sheltered escaped slaves among his regiment, earning him the nickname the "Abolition Colonel" and the regiment the nickname the "Abolition Regiment".

The case of one particular fugitive, a boy named "Adam", was well documented. Adam was claimed by Judge George Robertson, who had been Chief Justice of the Kentucky Court of Appeals. At the insistence of Judge Robertson, Utley was prosecuted in the local courts for theft. Utley wrote to former Governor Alexander Randall and President Lincoln requesting their assistance in resolving the matter. On November 26, 1862, President Lincoln wrote to Judge Robertson and offered him compensation up to $500 for the loss of his slave.

At the end of the war, an $800 judgement was rendered against Colonel Utley for having assisted the escape of Adam and other fugitive slaves. Utley paid the fine, but was later reimbursed by the U.S. government.

=== Prisoner of war ===
On March 3, 1863, the 22nd was ordered to Nashville, Tennessee. They were one of four regiments under the command of Colonel John Coburn ordered to perform reconnaissance toward Columbia, Tennessee, when they encountered a Confederate force near Spring Hill. Coburn engaged the Confederates in what would become the Battle of Thompson's Station. The Union forces were surrounded and a large number were captured, including Colonel Utley and Colonel Coburn. Lt. Colonel Bloodgood escaped the encirclement with about 150 men of the 22nd Wisconsin.

Utley was sent to Libby Prison with most his captured regiment and remained there for two months until they were released in a prisoner exchange. The 22nd was re-organized at St. Louis and Colonel Utley led them back into the field on June 12, 1863.

=== Return ===
Colonel Utley led the regiment for another year in Tennessee, and then into Georgia on the Atlanta campaign under General William Tecumseh Sherman. They participated in the Battles of Resaca, Adairsville (Cassville), New Hope Church, and Kennesaw Mountain.

In July 1864, Utley resigned due to poor health and returned to Wisconsin.

== Postbellum years ==
In public office, Utley was appointed Postmaster of Racine in 1869, and re-appointed in 1878.

Utley and his son, Hamilton, purchased the Racine Journal in 1865, which they published for nine years. In 1874, the Utleys sold the Journal and started the Racine Times and the Utley Dollar Weekly.

In the 1870s, Utley became associated with the new Greenback Party, and, in 1878, he began publishing the New Deal, a Greenback paper. Utley was the Greenback Party's nominee for Governor of Wisconsin in the 1884 election. Utley came in a distant fourth as Jeremiah McLain Rusk won re-election.

Utley's health never fully recovered from his time in captivity. He died of diabetes at his home in Racine in 1887.

== Personal life and family ==
Utley married his first wife, Louisa Wing, January 14, 1839, while living in New York. They had five children together, but only their son, Hamilton, survived to adulthood. Louisa died in 1864, a few months before Colonel Utley resigned from the Army.

Utley met his second wife after the war. Sarah Wooster was the widow of Dr. Wooster, who had been a surgeon for the 15th Wisconsin Volunteer Regiment. Sarah had one son from her previous marriage. Utley married Sarah Wooster on February 22, 1866. They had one son together, William L. Utley Jr.

Socially, Colonel Utley was a Mason and a member of the Grand Army of the Republic.

== Electoral history ==
=== U.S. House of Representatives (1882) ===
U.S. House of Representatives, Wisconsin 1st District election, 1882
Party	Candidate	Votes	%	±%
General Election, November 7, 1882
Democratic	John Winans	12,307	46.66%	+8.40%
Republican	Charles G. Williams (incumbent)	11,853	44.94%	−16.80%
Prohibition	C. M. Blackman	2,207	8.37%	
Greenback	William L. Utley	10	0.04%	
	Scattering	1	0.00%	
Total votes		26,377	100.0%	-14.35%
Democratic gain from Republican		Swing	25.20%	

=== Wisconsin Governor (1884) ===
Wisconsin gubernatorial election, 1884
Party	Candidate	Votes	%	±%
General Election, November 4, 1884
Republican	Jeremiah McLain Rusk (incumbent)	163,214	51.00%	+3.43%
Democratic	Nicholas D. Fratt	143,945	44.98%	+4.37%
Prohibition	Samuel D. Hastings	8,545	2.67%	−2.74%
Greenback	William L. Utley	4,274	1.34%	−5.03%
	Scattering	19	0.01%	
Total votes		319,997	100.0%	+86.20%
Republican hold				

Party political offices
Preceded by Edward P. Allis	Greenback nominee for Governor of Wisconsin; 1884	Succeeded by Party abolished
Military offices
Preceded by William A. Barstow	Adjutant General of Wisconsin; April 1, 1852 – April 1, 1854	Succeeded by John McManman
Preceded by James A. Swain	Adjutant General of Wisconsin; April 25, 1861 – January 7, 1862	Succeeded by Augustus Gaylord
Regiment established	Command of the 22nd Wisconsin Infantry Regiment; July 17, 1862 – July 5, 1864	Succeeded by Lt. Col. Edward Bloodgood
Wisconsin State Assembly
Preceded by Horace N. Chapman	Member of the Wisconsin State Assembly from the Racine 1st district 1851 – 1853	Succeeded by Horace T. Sanders
Wisconsin Senate
Preceded by Nicholas D. Fratt	Member of the Wisconsin Senate from the 7th district 1861 – 1863	Succeeded by Timothy D. Morris
