= Horace Chapman (politician) =

19th century American politician

Member of the Wisconsin State Assembly from the Racine 1st district
- In office January 7, 1850 – January 6, 1851
- Preceded by: Marshall Strong
- Succeeded by: William L. Utley

Personal details
- Born: February 26, 1811 Becket, Massachusetts, U.S.
- Died: February 6, 1884 (aged 72) Washington, D.C., U.S.
- Resting place: Oak Hill Cemetery, Washington, D.C.
- Spouse: Frances Sophia Robinson (m. 1864–1884)
- Children: 1

Horace Nelson Chapman (February 26, 1811 – February 6, 1884) was an American lawyer, politician, and Wisconsin pioneer. He served one term in the Wisconsin State Assembly, representing the city of Racine as a member of the Free Soil Party during the 1850 session.

== Background ==
Chapman was originally from Becket, Massachusetts.

== In Wisconsin ==
In April 1843, he was appointed by the Governor and Council of Massachusetts as a "Commissioner to Administer Oaths, &c." for use back in the Commonwealth; he was already a resident of Racine.

Chapman was a delegate from Racine at the Chicago River and Harbor Convention of 1847. The convention drew 2,315 delegates from 19 states to advocate for federal support of improvements to inland rivers and harbors.

In November 1847 he was among the officers of the first Masonic Lodge to be organized in Racine County.

== Legislative service ==
In 1849, he was elected to the Assembly from the 1st Racine County district (the Town of Racine), succeeding fellow Free Soiler Marshall Strong. He was not re-elected in 1850, and was succeeded by William L. Utley, yet another Free Soiler.

Wisconsin State Assembly
Preceded by Marshall Strong	Member of the Wisconsin State Assembly from the Racine 1st district January 7, 1850 – January 6, 1851	Succeeded by William L. Utley
