= Daniel B. Priest =

American lawyer and politician from Wisconsin (1830–1870)

Daniel Badger Priest (March 9, 1830 – September 6, 1870) was an American lawyer and legislator.

Born in Putnam County, Indiana, Priest graduated from Asbury University. In 1850, he moved to Fort Snelling, Minnesota Territory to farm. He moved to Monroe, Wisconsin in 1852 to practice law. In 1854, he ran for the Green County clerk of board of supervisors as a member of the Hunker faction of the Democratic Party. Then, in 1855, Priest moved to Richland Center, Wisconsin and continue to practice law. In 1861, Priest moved to Viroqua, Wisconsin. While in Viroqua, Priest served as District Attorney of Vernon County, Wisconsin. He also served in the Wisconsin State Assembly in 1863 and 1868. In 1869, Priest moved to Sparta, Wisconsin where he died. During his stay in Viroqua and Sparta, Priest was also editor of the local newspapers.
