= 1916 Wisconsin gubernatorial election =

- November 7, 1916
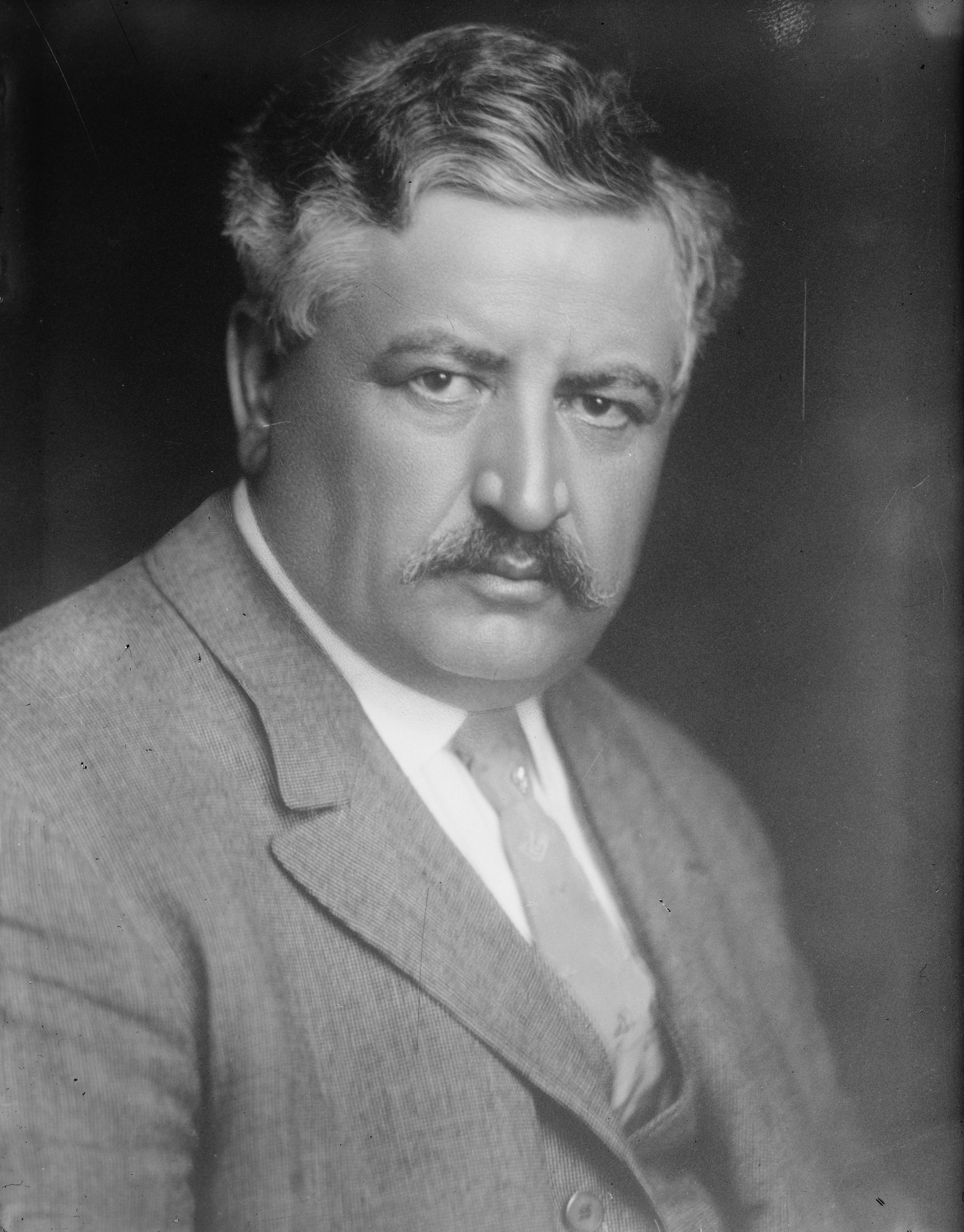

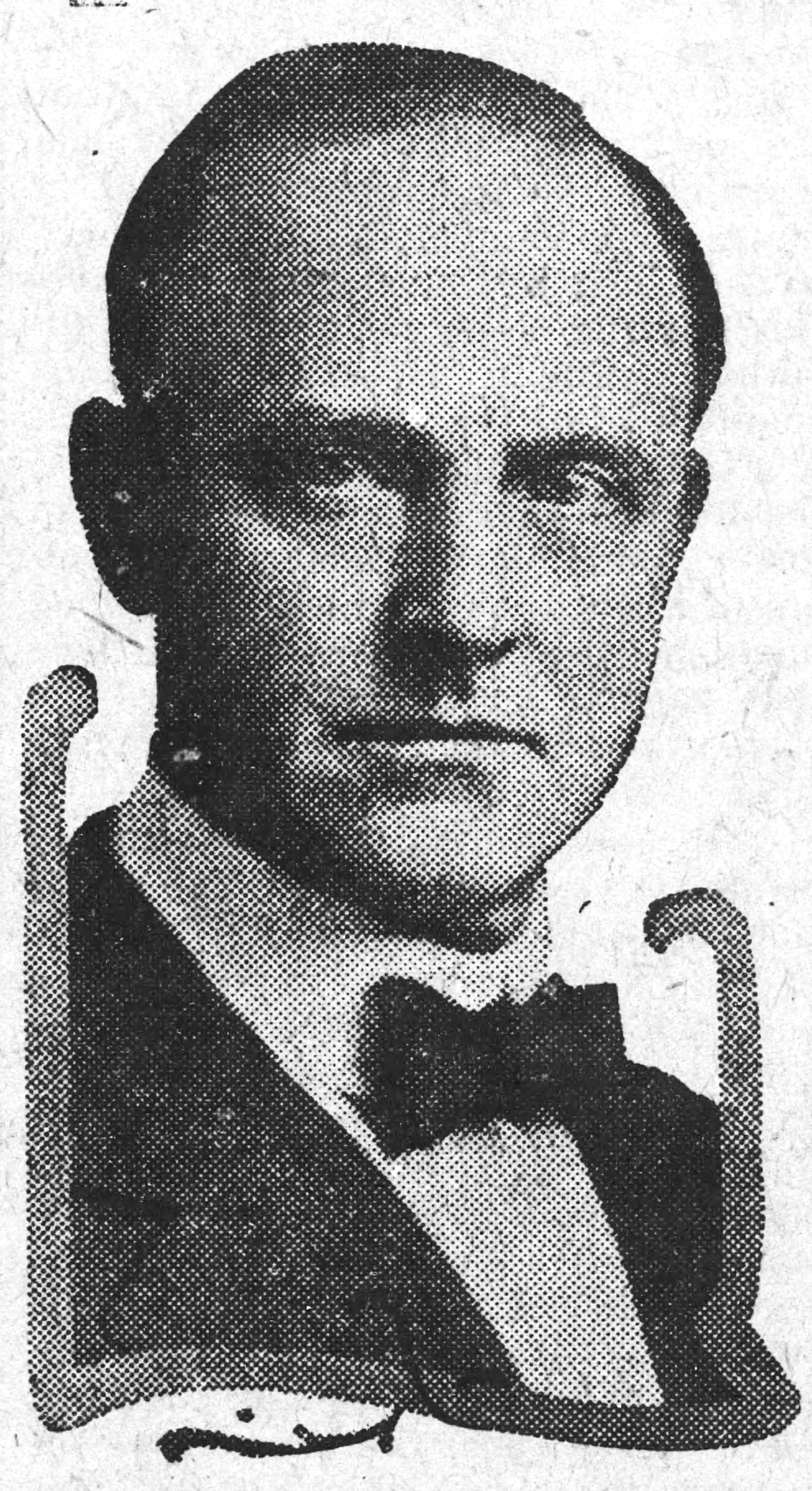

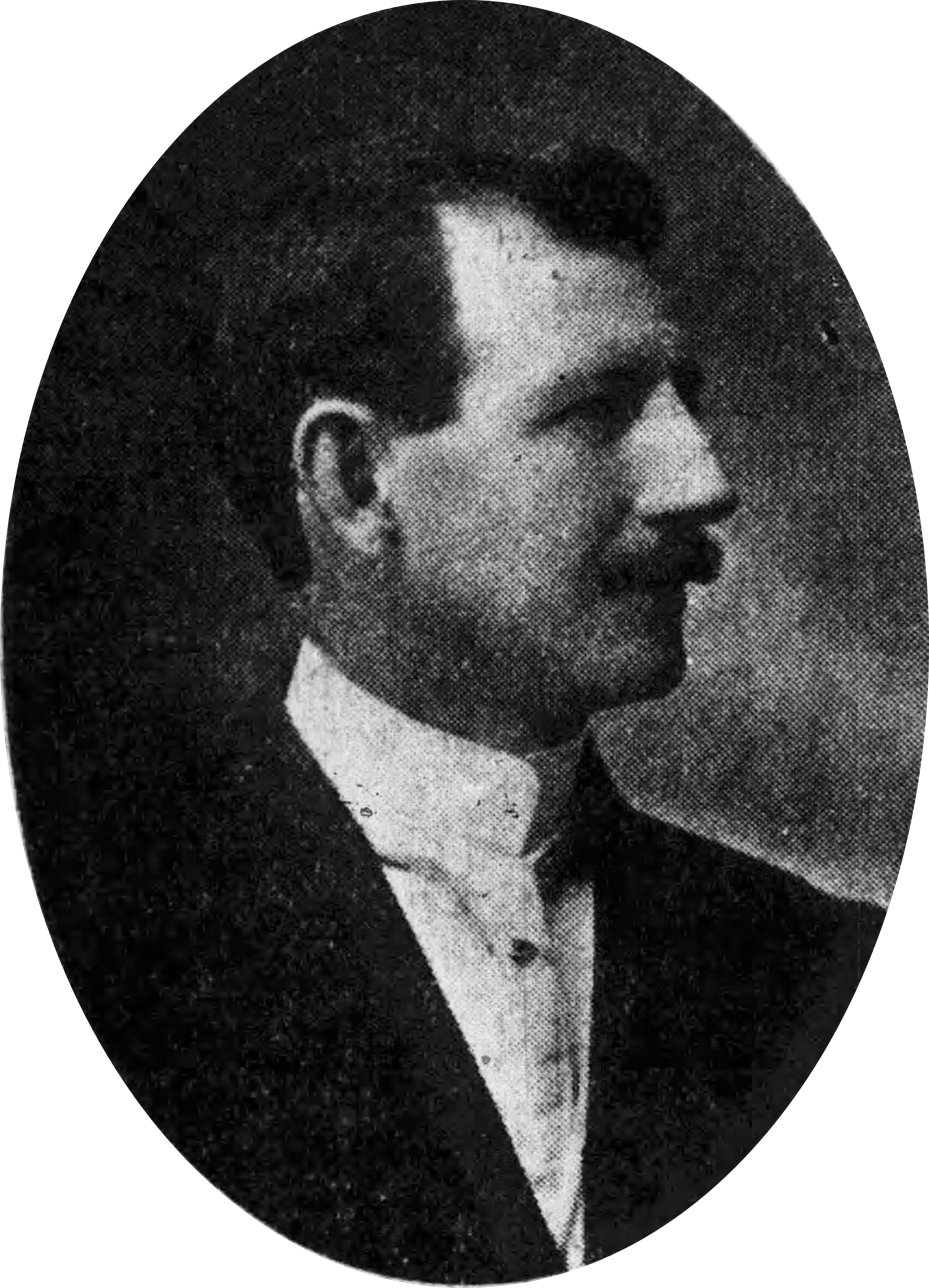
Nominee	Emanuel Lorenz Philipp	Burt Williams	Rae Weaver
Party	Republican	Democratic	Social-Democratic
Popular vote	229,889	164,555	30,649
Percentage	52.93%	37.89%	7.06%
- County results Philipp: 40–50% 50–60% 60–70% 70–80% Williams: 40–50% 50–60% 60–70%
Governor before election
Emanuel L. Philipp
Republican
Elected Governor
Emanuel L. Philipp
Republican

The 1916 Wisconsin gubernatorial election was held on November 7, 1916. Primary elections were held on September 5, 1916.

Incumbent Republican Governor Emanuel L. Philipp won the election with 52.93% of the vote, winning his second term as governor. Philipp defeated Democratic Party candidate Burt Williams and Social-Democratic candidate Rae Weaver.

== Primary election ==
=== Republican party ===
==== Candidates ====
- Don C. Hall, former member of the Wisconsin State Assembly
- William H. Hatton, former State Senator and unsuccessful candidate for Democratic nomination for Governor in 1914
- Francis E. McGovern, former Governor
- Emanuel L. Philipp, incumbent Governor

==== Results ====
Republican primary results
Party	Candidate	Votes	%
Republican	Emanuel L. Philipp (incumbent)	83,769	48.59%
Republican	William H. Hatton	47,618	27.62%
Republican	Francis E. McGovern	35,845	20.79%
Republican	Don C. Hall	5,154	2.99%
Total votes		172,386	100.00%

=== Democratic party ===
==== Candidates ====
- Burt Williams, Democratic nominee for Lieutenant Governor in 1908

==== Results ====
Democratic primary results
Party	Candidate	Votes	%
Democratic	Burt Williams	40,124	100.00%
Total votes		40,124	100.00%

=== Social-Democratic party ===
==== Candidates ====
- Rae Weaver, Social-Democratic nominee for Secretary of State of Wisconsin in 1912

==== Results ====
Social-Democratic primary results
Party	Candidate	Votes	%
Social-Democratic	Rae Weaver	11,852	100.00%
Total votes		11,852	100.00%

=== Prohibition party ===
==== Candidates ====
- George McKerrow, Prohibition nominee for Secretary of State of Wisconsin in 1890

==== Results ====
Prohibition primary results
Party	Candidate	Votes	%
Prohibition	George McKerrow	1,974	100.00%
Total votes		1,974	100.00%

== General election ==
=== Results ===
1918 Wisconsin gubernatorial election (Note: One must exercise caution using the Blue Book as a source for Wisconsin election data for the period of 1890-1920 as it was unreliable during this period. In this case, the Blue Book's totals for all candidates are incorrect and it also contains numerous mistakes in the county figures. The Blue Book also lists the military vote as a separate total, but those votes were actually tabulated by county.)
Party	Candidate	Votes	%	±%
Republican	Emanuel L. Philipp (incumbent)	229,889	52.93%	+9.67%
Democratic	Burt Williams	164,555	37.89%	+1.16%
Social-Democratic	Rae Weaver	30,649	7.13%	−0.91%
Prohibition	George McKerrow	9,193	2.12%	+0.19%
	Scattering	54	0.01%	
Majority		65,334	15.11%	
Total votes		434,340	100.00%	
Republican hold		Swing	+8.57%	

=== Results by county ===
Williams was the first Democrat since George W. Peck in 1892 to win Iowa County and La Crosse County; the latter would not vote Democratic again until 1950. By voting for Williams, Iowa County and La Crosse county voted for the losing candidate for the first time since 1881 and 1886, respectively.

County	Emanuel L. Philipp Republican		Burt Williams Democratic		Rae Weaver Social-Democratic		George McKerrow Prohibition		Scattering Write-in		Margin		Total votes cast (Note: These figures include the military vote, which was enumerated separately by county)
County	#	%	#	%	#	%	#	%	#	%	#	%	Total votes cast
Adams	999	56.03%	677	37.97%	40	2.24%	65	3.65%	2	0.11%	322	18.06%	1,783
Ashland	1,779	47.78%	1,732	46.52%	137	3.68%	75	2.01%	0	0.00%	47	1.26%	3,723
Barron	2,512	53.81%	1,727	37.00%	103	2.21%	323	6.92%	3	0.06%	785	16.82%	4,668
Bayfield	1,309	52.38%	944	37.78%	183	7.32%	63	2.52%	0	0.00%	365	14.61%	2,499
Brown	4,734	49.94%	4,352	45.91%	271	2.86%	123	1.30%	0	0.00%	382	4.03%	9,480
Buffalo	1,582	63.31%	811	32.45%	48	1.92%	57	2.28%	1	0.04%	771	30.85%	2,499
Burnett	1,036	57.52%	572	31.76%	123	6.83%	69	3.83%	1	0.06%	464	25.76%	1,801
Calumet	1,978	58.18%	1,353	39.79%	48	1.41%	21	0.62%	0	0.00%	625	18.38%	3,400
Chippewa	3,310	59.66%	2,079	37.47%	52	0.94%	106	1.91%	1	0.02%	1,231	22.19%	5,548
Clark	3,417	67.84%	1,383	27.46%	115	2.28%	122	2.42%	0	0.00%	2,034	40.38%	5,037
Columbia	3,425	60.26%	2,023	35.59%	70	1.23%	166	2.92%	0	0.00%	1,402	24.67%	5,684
Crawford	1,817	49.79%	1,756	48.12%	28	0.77%	47	1.29%	1	0.03%	61	1.67%	3,649
Dane	6,188	36.38%	10,392	61.09%	138	0.81%	292	1.72%	1	0.01%	-4,204	-24.71%	17,011
Dodge	4,671	49.52%	4,446	47.13%	179	1.90%	137	1.45%	0	0.00%	225	2.39%	9,433
Door	1,973	72.48%	638	23.44%	43	1.58%	68	2.50%	0	0.00%	1,335	49.04%	2,722
Douglas	2,978	44.21%	2,825	41.94%	817	12.13%	116	1.72%	0	0.00%	153	2.27%	6,736
Dunn	2,733	67.08%	1,086	26.66%	140	3.44%	113	2.77%	2	0.05%	1,647	40.43%	4,074
Eau Claire	2,846	54.76%	2,093	40.27%	132	2.54%	125	2.41%	1	0.02%	753	14.49%	5,197
Florence	447	77.34%	111	19.20%	11	1.90%	9	1.56%	0	0.00%	336	58.13%	578
Fond du Lac	5,835	54.39%	4,551	42.42%	127	1.18%	214	1.99%	1	0.01%	1,284	11.97%	10,728
Forest	746	56.73%	518	39.39%	25	1.90%	26	1.98%	0	0.00%	228	17.34%	1,315
Grant	4,779	59.04%	3,079	38.04%	54	0.67%	183	2.26%	0	0.00%	1,700	21.00%	8,095
Green	2,123	50.18%	1,873	44.27%	50	1.18%	180	4.25%	5	0.12%	250	5.91%	4,231
Green Lake	1,649	56.20%	1,185	40.39%	35	1.19%	65	2.22%	0	0.00%	464	15.81%	2,934
Iowa	2,122	46.55%	2,252	49.40%	17	0.37%	167	3.66%	1	0.02%	-130	-2.85%	4,559
Iron	770	62.96%	379	30.99%	41	3.35%	33	2.70%	0	0.00%	391	31.97%	1,223
Jackson	1,979	71.24%	695	25.02%	48	1.73%	55	1.98%	1	0.04%	1,284	46.22%	2,778
Jefferson	3,879	51.66%	3,421	45.56%	71	0.95%	137	1.82%	0	0.00%	458	6.10%	7,508
Juneau	2,417	63.76%	1,189	31.36%	83	2.19%	102	2.69%	0	0.00%	1,228	32.39%	3,791
Kenosha	3,722	56.43%	2,255	34.19%	485	7.35%	134	2.03%	0	0.00%	1,467	22.24%	6,596
Kewaunee	1,365	45.52%	1,591	53.05%	12	0.40%	31	1.03%	0	0.00%	-226	-7.54%	2,999
La Crosse	3,627	45.64%	3,898	49.05%	283	3.56%	139	1.75%	0	0.00%	-271	-3.41%	7,947
Lafayette	2,422	53.48%	1,984	43.81%	19	0.42%	104	2.30%	0	0.00%	438	9.67%	4,529
Langlade	1,619	49.66%	1,539	47.21%	62	1.90%	40	1.23%	0	0.00%	80	2.45%	3,260
Lincoln	2,036	57.76%	1,330	37.73%	109	3.09%	49	1.39%	1	0.03%	706	20.03%	3,525
Manitowoc	4,445	50.07%	3,935	44.32%	425	4.79%	73	0.82%	0	0.00%	510	5.74%	8,878
Marathon	5,828	57.40%	3,653	35.98%	555	5.47%	117	1.15%	0	0.00%	2,175	21.42%	10,153
Marinette	3,162	62.84%	1,600	31.80%	135	2.68%	135	2.68%	0	0.00%	1,562	31.04%	5,032
Marquette	1,233	56.64%	857	39.37%	13	0.60%	74	3.40%	0	0.00%	376	17.27%	2,177
Milwaukee	35,204	44.19%	23,197	29.12%	20,758	26.06%	496	0.62%	3	0.00%	12,007	15.07%	79,658
Monroe	2,790	54.70%	2,069	40.56%	95	1.86%	147	2.88%	0	0.00%	721	14.13%	5,101
Oconto	2,819	63.43%	1,499	33.73%	63	1.42%	63	1.42%	0	0.00%	1,320	29.70%	4,444
Oneida	1,197	51.98%	824	35.78%	255	11.07%	27	1.17%	0	0.00%	373	16.20%	2,303
Outagamie	5,387	55.04%	4,163	42.53%	119	1.22%	119	1.22%	0	0.00%	1,224	12.51%	9,788
Ozaukee	1,531	48.87%	1,537	49.06%	46	1.47%	19	0.61%	0	0.00%	-6	-0.19%	3,133
Pepin	704	51.96%	591	43.62%	22	1.62%	37	2.73%	1	0.07%	113	8.34%	1,355
Pierce	2,135	61.35%	1,168	33.56%	44	1.26%	132	3.79%	1	0.03%	967	27.79%	3,480
Polk	2,159	55.39%	1,456	37.35%	160	4.10%	123	3.16%	0	0.00%	703	18.03%	3,898
Portage	2,532	45.75%	2,857	51.62%	56	1.01%	90	1.63%	0	0.00%	-325	-5.87%	5,535
Price	1,662	61.28%	850	31.34%	135	4.98%	64	2.36%	1	0.04%	812	29.94%	2,712
Racine	4,974	48.18%	4,066	39.39%	679	6.58%	601	5.82%	3	0.03%	908	8.80%	10,323
Richland	1,943	47.59%	1,734	42.47%	66	1.62%	339	8.30%	1	0.02%	209	5.12%	4,083
Rock	7,196	65.50%	3,239	29.48%	212	1.93%	339	3.09%	1	0.01%	3,957	36.02%	10,987
Rusk	999	50.66%	775	39.30%	118	5.98%	80	4.06%	0	0.00%	224	11.36%	1,972
Sauk	3,700	60.55%	2,088	34.17%	36	0.59%	287	4.70%	0	0.00%	1,612	26.38%	6,111
Sawyer	530	47.79%	526	47.43%	27	2.43%	26	2.34%	0	0.00%	4	0.36%	1,109
Shawano	3,428	71.67%	1,177	24.61%	96	2.01%	79	1.65%	3	0.06%	2,251	47.06%	4,783
Sheboygan	5,406	53.20%	3,730	36.71%	912	8.97%	113	1.11%	1	0.01%	1,676	16.49%	10,162
St. Croix	2,786	54.80%	2,033	39.99%	141	2.77%	124	2.44%	0	0.00%	753	14.81%	5,084
Taylor	1,544	63.64%	722	29.76%	100	4.12%	60	2.47%	0	0.00%	822	33.88%	2,426
Trempealeau	2,178	58.80%	1,372	37.04%	28	0.76%	119	3.21%	7	0.19%	806	21.76%	3,704
Vernon	2,756	57.67%	1,773	37.10%	37	0.77%	213	4.46%	0	0.00%	983	20.57%	4,729
Vilas	566	55.27%	368	35.94%	72	7.03%	18	1.76%	0	0.00%	198	19.34%	1,024
Walworth	4,148	63.89%	1,969	30.33%	64	0.99%	308	4.74%	3	0.05%	2,179	33.56%	6,492
Washburn	1,097	66.36%	416	25.17%	77	4.66%	62	3.75%	1	0.06%	681	41.20%	1,653
Washington	3,093	55.21%	2,402	42.88%	59	1.05%	47	0.84%	1	0.02%	691	12.33%	5,602
Waukesha	4,174	51.88%	3,392	42.16%	130	1.62%	349	4.34%	0	0.00%	782	9.72%	8,045
Waupaca	4,405	70.60%	1,564	25.07%	97	1.55%	171	2.74%	2	0.03%	2,841	45.54%	6,239
Waushara	2,426	73.94%	707	21.55%	76	2.32%	69	2.10%	3	0.09%	1,719	52.39%	3,281
Winnebago	5,902	51.19%	5,071	43.98%	359	3.11%	198	1.72%	0	0.00%	831	7.21%	11,530
Wood	3,026	52.50%	2,436	42.26%	183	3.17%	119	2.06%	0	0.00%	590	10.24%	5,764
Total	229,889	52.93%	164,555	37.89%	30,649	7.06%	9,193	2.12%	54	0.01%	65,334	15.11%	434,340

==== Counties that flipped from Democratic to Republican ====
- Brown
- Calumet
- Chippewa
- Crawford
- Dodge
- Fond du Lac
- Jefferson
- Langlade
- Manitowoc
- Pepin
- Vilas
- Washington

==== Counties that flipped from Republican to Democratic ====
- Iowa
- La Crosse

== Bibliography ==
- Gubernatorial Elections, 1787-1997. Washington, D.C.: Congressional Quarterly Inc. 1998. ISBN 1-56802-396-0.
- The Wisconsin Blue Book, 1917. Madison, Wisconsin: Democrat Printing Co., State Printer. 1917.
