= 1877 Wisconsin gubernatorial election =

- November 6, 1877
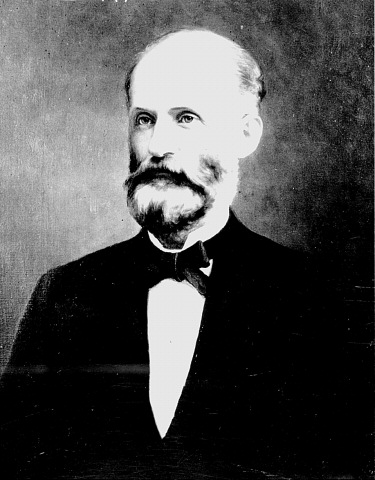

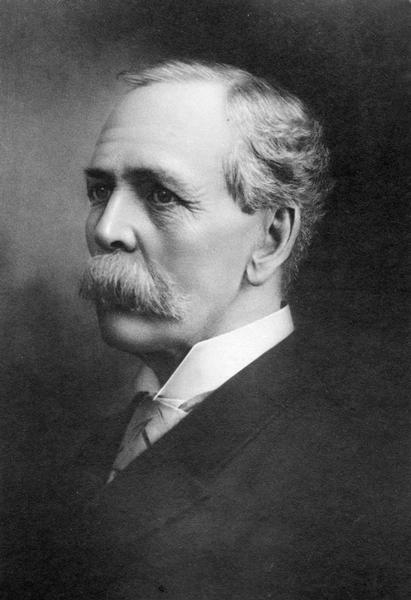

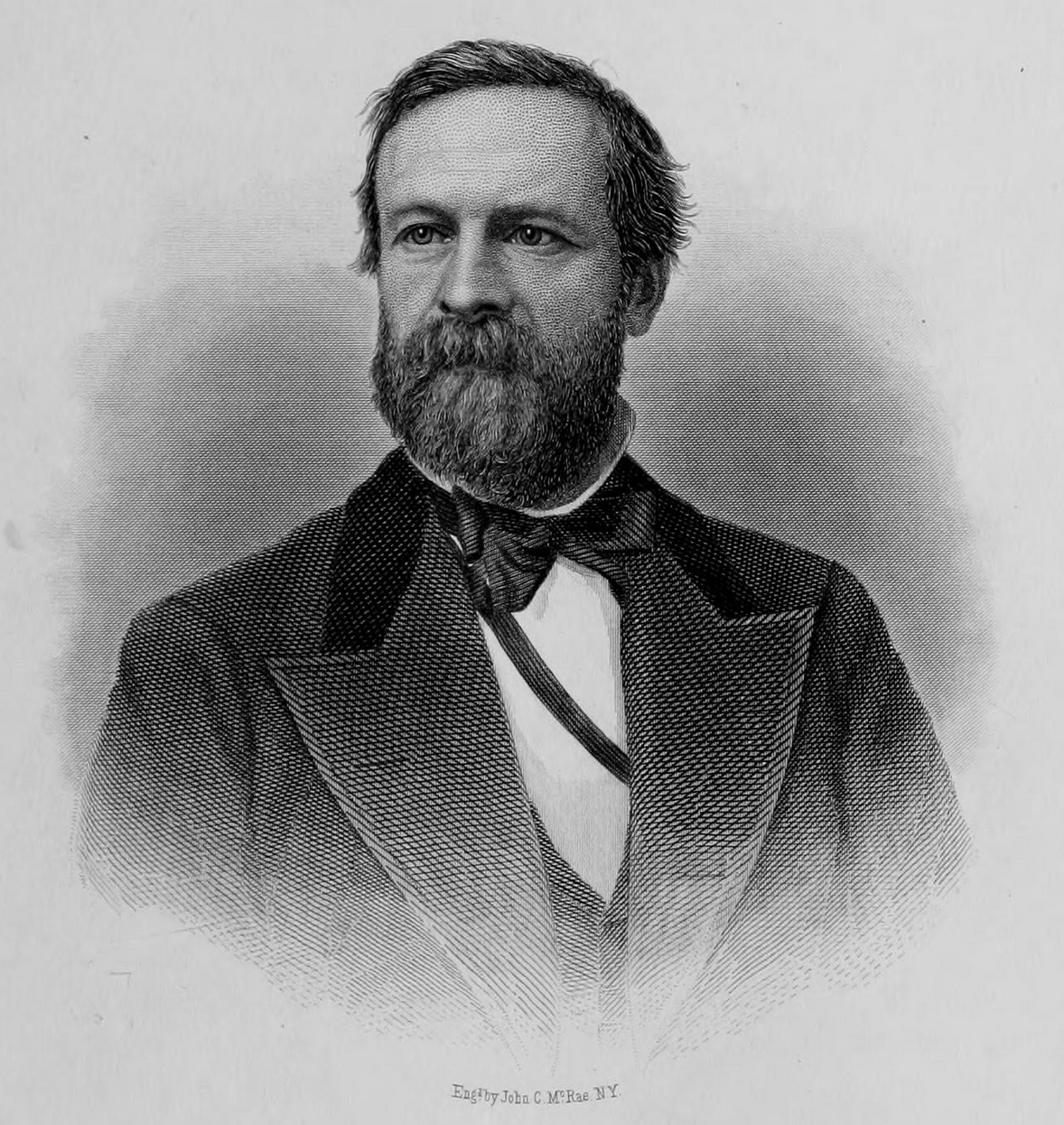
| Nominee | William E. Smith | James A. Mallory | Edward Phelps Allis |
| Party | Republican | Democratic | Greenback |
| Popular vote | 78,759 | 70,486 | 26,216 |
| Percentage | 44.22% | 39.57% | 14.72% |
- County results Smith : 30–40% 40–50% 50–60% 60–70% 70–80% >90% Taylor : 30–40% 40–50% 50–60% 60–70% 70–80% Allis : 50–60% 80–90%
Governor before election
Harrison Ludington
Republican
Elected Governor
William E. Smith
Republican

The 1877 Wisconsin gubernatorial election was held on November 6, 1877. Under internal party pressure, incumbent Republican Governor Harrison Ludington, who had barely won the 1875 election, was pressured to not seek a second term. Former State Assembly Speaker William E. Smith, a longtime figure in Wisconsin politics, was selected as the Republican nominee, and Milwaukee County Municipal Judge Thomas A. Mallory won a protracted battle for the nomination at the Democratic convention. Smith and Mallory were joined in the general election by Greenback nominee Edward Phelps Allis. Ultimately, though the Republican vote share shrank relative to 1875, the Democratic vote share shrank more, and Smith won a larger victory than Ludington did, though only with a 44% plurality.

== Nominations ==
=== Republican convention ===
The Republican convention was significantly less drawn-out than the Democratic convention, with most of the drama over the nomination occurring in the months before. Significant opposition developed in the Republican Party to the possible nomination of Governor Ludington for re-election, and former State Assembly Speaker William E. Smith, Ludington's opponent for the nomination two years earlier, emerging as a leading candidate. Smith's supporters produced a letter written from Ludington to Smith during the 1875 Republican convention, which thanked Smith for withdrawing from the race and promised to step aside for Smith in 1877:

I only want to be Governor one term. That's all I ask. Two years from now, I shall not be in your way, or in any one else's, for the nomination. "Don't make it an absolute refusal," one of the members urged with fervor that almost disarmed me, and I think I made no reply.

— Chippewa Herald

Ultimately, under significant pressure from the state Republican establishment, Ludington announced that he would not seek a second term. At the Republican convention in September, Smith took an early lead on the informal ballot of the delegates and then was nominated unanimously.

=== Democratic convention ===
At the Democratic convention, several candidates entered the contest as apparent frontrunners: former State Senator Nicholas D. Fratt, Lieutenant Governor Charles D. Parker, State Senator Romanzo E. Davis, and State Prison Commissioner H. N. Smith. At the convention, a number of candidates were nominated, though some immediately made it clear that they would decline any nomination:

- James A. Mallory, Milwaukee County Municipal Judge
- Nicholas D. Fratt, former State Senator
- Charles D. Parker
- Romanzo E. Davis, State Senator
- H. N. Smith, State Prison Commissioner
- John A. Rice, former State Senator
- Levi Baker Vilas, former State Assemblyman
- H. H. Gray, former State Senator
- William Freeman Vilas, law professor (declined nomination)
- James Rood Doolittle, former U.S. Senator
- Alexander Mitchell, former U.S. Congressman from Wisconsin's 4th congressional district (declined nomination)
- Nelson Dewey, former Governor of Wisconsin
- James G. Jenkins (declined nomination)

The contest took five ballots to decide. On the first ballot, Fratt took an early lead, with Parker and Davis immediately behind him. After the first ballot, Smith withdrew. On the second ballot, Davis rocketed to first place, with Fratt's and Parker's support starting to decline. Mallory slowly began climbing on the second ballot. On the third ballot, Davis continued to climb, Fratt fell, and Mallory rose to third place over Parker. At this point, the Milwaukee contingent at the convention, eager to stop Parker, a Madisonian from earning the nomination, began to solidify around Mallory as a compromise candidate. On the fourth ballot, Mallory more than doubled his support, Davis continued to climb, and Fratt and Parker both plummeted; after this round of balloting had concluded, Fratt's name was withdrawn. Finally, on the fifth ballot, Mallory won the nomination over Davis handily.

==== Results ====
1877 Democratic convention ballot
| Ballot | 1 | 2 | 3 | 4 | 5 |
|---|---|---|---|---|---|
| J. A. Mallory | 25 | 32 | 43 | 108 | 146 |
| N. D. Fratt | 68 | 65 | 55 | 18 | 0 |
| C. D. Parker | 58 | 41 | 41 | 18 | 0 |
| R. E. Davis | 49 | 82 | 99 | 95 | 91 |
| H. N. Smith | 20 | 2 | 0 | 95 | 0 |
| J. A. Rice | 9 | 5 | 6 | 3 | 0 |
| L. B. Vilas | 9 | 10 | 7 | 4 | 0 |
| H. H. Gray | 9 | 4 | 0 | 0 | 0 |
| W. F. Vilas | 6 | 5 | 4 | 1 | 0 |
| J. R. Doolittle | 2 | 0 | 0 | 0 | 0 |
| A. Mitchell | 1 | 1 | 3 | 0 | 0 |
| N. Dewey | 1 | 0 | 0 | 0 | 0 |

== Results ==
1877 Wisconsin gubernatorial election
| Party | Candidate | Votes | % | ±% |
|---|---|---|---|---|
| Republican | William E. Smith | 78,759 | 44.22% | −5.85% |
| Democratic | James A. Mallory | 70,486 | 39.57% | −10.00% |
| Greenback | Edward P. Allis | 26,216 | 14.72% | |
| Socialist | Collin M. Campbell | 2,176 | 1.22% | |
| Prohibition | J. C. Hall | 399 | 0.22% | −0.05% |
| | Scattering | 86 | 0.05% | |
| Majority | | 8,273 | 4.64% | |
| Total votes | | 178,122 | 100.00% | |
| Republican hold | | Swing | +4.18% | |

=== Results by county ===
Mallory was the first Democrat to ever carry Winnebago County. This was the first of 40 consecutive gubernatorial elections in which Oconto County backed the winning candidate, a streak that would last until 1958.

| County | William E. Smith Republican | | James A. Mallory Democratic | | Edward P. Allis Greenback | | Collin M. Campbell Socialist | | J. C. Hall Prohibition | | Scattering Write-in | | Margin | | Total votes cast |
| County | # | % | # | % | # | % | # | % | # | % | # | % | # | % | Total votes cast |
|---|---|---|---|---|---|---|---|---|---|---|---|---|---|---|---|
| Adams | 580 | 62.43% | 233 | 25.08% | 116 | 12.49% | 0 | 0.00% | 0 | 0.00% | 0 | 0.00% | 347 | 37.35% | 929 |
| Ashland | 86 | 34.54% | 163 | 65.46% | 0 | 0.00% | 0 | 0.00% | 0 | 0.00% | 0 | 0.00% | -77 | -30.92% | 249 |
| Barron | 459 | 64.20% | 203 | 28.39% | 53 | 7.41% | 0 | 0.00% | 0 | 0.00% | 0 | 0.00% | 256 | 35.80% | 715 |
| Bayfield | 40 | 52.63% | 34 | 44.74% | 2 | 2.63% | 0 | 0.00% | 0 | 0.00% | 0 | 0.00% | 6 | 7.89% | 76 |
| Brown | 1,387 | 33.38% | 1,740 | 41.88% | 1,015 | 24.43% | 0 | 0.00% | 13 | 0.31% | 0 | 0.00% | -353 | -8.50% | 4,155 |
| Buffalo | 1,075 | 54.82% | 810 | 41.31% | 76 | 3.88% | 0 | 0.00% | 0 | 0.00% | 0 | 0.00% | 265 | 13.51% | 1,961 |
| Burnett | 336 | 93.33% | 24 | 6.67% | 0 | 0.00% | 0 | 0.00% | 0 | 0.00% | 0 | 0.00% | 312 | 86.67% | 360 |
| Calumet | 450 | 22.59% | 1,130 | 56.73% | 389 | 19.53% | 20 | 1.00% | 0 | 0.00% | 3 | 0.15% | -680 | -34.14% | 1,992 |
| Chippewa | 675 | 34.49% | 693 | 35.41% | 589 | 30.10% | 0 | 0.00% | 0 | 0.00% | 0 | 0.00% | -18 | -0.92% | 1,957 |
| Clark | 449 | 31.66% | 153 | 10.79% | 816 | 57.55% | 0 | 0.00% | 0 | 0.00% | 0 | 0.00% | -367 (Note: Allis's margin over Smith) | -25.89% | 1,418 |
| Columbia | 2,048 | 54.19% | 1,597 | 42.26% | 118 | 3.12% | 2 | 0.05% | 14 | 0.37% | 0 | 0.00% | 451 | 11.93% | 3,779 |
| Crawford | 806 | 41.12% | 1,008 | 51.43% | 146 | 7.45% | 0 | 0.00% | 0 | 0.00% | 0 | 0.00% | -202 | -10.31% | 1,960 |
| Dane | 3,613 | 44.24% | 3,903 | 47.80% | 614 | 7.52% | 0 | 0.00% | 0 | 0.00% | 36 | 0.44% | -290 | -3.55% | 8,166 |
| Dodge | 2,333 | 33.14% | 4,267 | 60.62% | 381 | 5.41% | 1 | 0.01% | 57 | 0.81% | 0 | 0.00% | -1,934 | -27.48% | 7,039 |
| Door | 477 | 48.38% | 126 | 12.78% | 383 | 38.84% | 0 | 0.00% | 0 | 0.00% | 0 | 0.00% | 94 (Note: Smith's margin over Allis) | 9.54% | 986 |
| Douglas | 21 | 42.86% | 28 | 57.14% | 0 | 0.00% | 0 | 0.00% | 0 | 0.00% | 0 | 0.00% | -7 | -14.29% | 49 |
| Dunn | 1,174 | 55.64% | 407 | 19.29% | 412 | 19.53% | 109 | 5.17% | 8 | 0.38% | 0 | 0.00% | 762 | 36.11% | 2,110 |
| Eau Claire | 1,208 | 46.28% | 805 | 30.84% | 597 | 22.87% | 0 | 0.00% | 0 | 0.00% | 0 | 0.00% | 403 | 15.44% | 2,610 |
| Fond du Lac | 3,086 | 39.14% | 3,414 | 43.30% | 1,249 | 15.84% | 15 | 0.19% | 119 | 1.51% | 1 | 0.01% | -328 | -4.16% | 7,884 |
| Grant | 2,620 | 46.82% | 1,938 | 34.63% | 1,037 | 18.53% | 0 | 0.00% | 0 | 0.00% | 1 | 0.02% | 682 | 12.19% | 5,596 |
| Green | 1,823 | 56.02% | 849 | 26.09% | 580 | 17.82% | 1 | 0.03% | 0 | 0.00% | 1 | 0.03% | 974 | 29.93% | 3,254 |
| Green Lake | 879 | 43.15% | 896 | 43.99% | 215 | 10.55% | 0 | 0.00% | 47 | 2.31% | 0 | 0.00% | -17 | -0.83% | 2,037 |
| Iowa | 1,461 | 39.91% | 1,175 | 32.10% | 1,021 | 27.89% | 0 | 0.00% | 4 | 0.11% | 0 | 0.00% | 286 | 7.81% | 3,661 |
| Jackson | 802 | 46.74% | 391 | 22.79% | 521 | 30.36% | 0 | 0.00% | 2 | 0.12% | 0 | 0.00% | 281 | 16.38% | 1,716 |
| Jefferson | 1,917 | 41.03% | 2,418 | 51.76% | 296 | 6.34% | 22 | 0.47% | 0 | 0.00% | 19 | 0.41% | -501 | -10.72% | 4,672 |
| Juneau | 1,045 | 43.63% | 883 | 36.87% | 463 | 19.33% | 0 | 0.00% | 3 | 0.13% | 1 | 0.04% | 162 | 6.76% | 2,395 |
| Kenosha | 938 | 49.47% | 907 | 47.84% | 51 | 2.69% | 0 | 0.00% | 0 | 0.00% | 0 | 0.00% | 31 | 1.64% | 1,896 |
| Kewaunee | 247 | 28.00% | 558 | 63.27% | 20 | 2.27% | 57 | 6.46% | 0 | 0.00% | 0 | 0.00% | -311 | -35.26% | 882 |
| La Crosse | 1,968 | 52.35% | 1,115 | 29.66% | 524 | 13.94% | 149 | 3.96% | 0 | 0.00% | 3 | 0.08% | 853 | 22.69% | 3,759 |
| Lafayette | 1,409 | 47.31% | 1,300 | 43.65% | 269 | 9.03% | 0 | 0.00% | 0 | 0.00% | 0 | 0.00% | 109 | 3.66% | 2,978 |
| Lincoln | 27 | 12.80% | 15 | 7.11% | 169 | 80.09% | 0 | 0.00% | 0 | 0.00% | 0 | 0.00% | -142 | -67.29% | 211 |
| Manitowoc | 1,365 | 38.16% | 1,951 | 54.54% | 98 | 2.74% | 155 | 4.33% | 8 | 0.22% | 0 | 0.00% | -586 | -16.38% | 3,577 |
| Marathon | 301 | 16.69% | 755 | 41.87% | 746 | 41.38% | 1 | 0.06% | 0 | 0.00% | 0 | 0.00% | -9 (Note: Mallory's margin over Allis) | -0.50% | 1,803 |
| Marquette | 447 | 35.56% | 730 | 58.07% | 76 | 6.05% | 0 | 0.00% | 4 | 0.32% | 0 | 0.00% | -283 | -22.51% | 1,257 |
| Milwaukee | 5,843 | 39.28% | 6,388 | 42.94% | 1,228 | 8.25% | 1,407 | 9.46% | 10 | 0.07% | 0 | 0.00% | -545 | -3.66% | 14,876 |
| Monroe | 1,102 | 34.26% | 1,096 | 34.07% | 1,019 | 31.68% | 0 | 0.00% | 0 | 0.00% | 0 | 0.00% | 6 | 0.19% | 3,217 |
| Oconto | 1,059 | 53.43% | 764 | 38.55% | 157 | 7.92% | 0 | 0.00% | 0 | 0.00% | 2 | 0.10% | 295 | 14.88% | 1,982 |
| Outagamie | 776 | 20.56% | 2,005 | 53.11% | 992 | 26.28% | 0 | 0.00% | 0 | 0.00% | 2 | 0.05% | -1,013 | -26.83% | 3,775 |
| Ozaukee | 437 | 21.08% | 1,579 | 76.17% | 17 | 0.82% | 38 | 1.83% | 0 | 0.00% | 2 | 0.10% | -1,142 | -55.09% | 2,073 |
| Pepin | 521 | 63.85% | 171 | 20.96% | 123 | 15.07% | 0 | 0.00% | 0 | 0.00% | 1 | 0.12% | 350 | 42.89% | 816 |
| Pierce | 1,523 | 61.46% | 545 | 21.99% | 408 | 16.46% | 0 | 0.00% | 0 | 0.00% | 2 | 0.08% | 978 | 39.47% | 2,478 |
| Polk | 916 | 68.36% | 363 | 27.09% | 60 | 4.48% | 0 | 0.00% | 0 | 0.00% | 1 | 0.07% | 553 | 41.27% | 1,340 |
| Portage | 1,080 | 39.47% | 917 | 33.52% | 728 | 26.61% | 3 | 0.11% | 8 | 0.29% | 0 | 0.00% | 163 | 5.96% | 2,736 |
| Racine | 2,304 | 53.30% | 1,906 | 44.09% | 112 | 2.59% | 0 | 0.00% | 0 | 0.00% | 1 | 0.02% | 398 | 9.21% | 4,323 |
| Richland | 1,201 | 45.58% | 729 | 27.67% | 705 | 26.76% | 0 | 0.00% | 0 | 0.00% | 0 | 0.00% | 472 | 17.91% | 2,635 |
| Rock | 3,375 | 58.39% | 1,620 | 28.03% | 781 | 13.51% | 0 | 0.00% | 4 | 0.07% | 0 | 0.00% | 1,755 | 30.36% | 5,780 |
| Sauk | 1,826 | 53.85% | 922 | 27.19% | 574 | 16.93% | 68 | 2.01% | 0 | 0.00% | 1 | 0.03% | 904 | 26.66% | 3,391 |
| Shawano | 269 | 27.28% | 605 | 61.36% | 92 | 9.33% | 0 | 0.00% | 20 | 2.03% | 0 | 0.00% | -336 | -34.08% | 986 |
| Sheboygan | 1,598 | 38.66% | 1,737 | 42.02% | 750 | 18.14% | 48 | 1.16% | 0 | 0.00% | 1 | 0.02% | -139 | -3.36% | 4,134 |
| St. Croix | 1,559 | 49.63% | 1,489 | 47.41% | 93 | 2.96% | 0 | 0.00% | 0 | 0.00% | 0 | 0.00% | 70 | 2.23% | 3,141 |
| Taylor | 195 | 38.84% | 254 | 50.60% | 53 | 10.56% | 0 | 0.00% | 0 | 0.00% | 0 | 0.00% | -59 | -11.75% | 502 |
| Trempealeau | 2,483 | 72.52% | 731 | 21.35% | 176 | 5.14% | 0 | 0.00% | 34 | 0.99% | 0 | 0.00% | 1,752 | 51.17% | 3,424 |
| Vernon | 1,678 | 57.04% | 416 | 14.14% | 846 | 28.76% | 0 | 0.00% | 0 | 0.00% | 2 | 0.07% | 832 | 28.38% | 2,942 |
| Walworth | 2,914 | 65.48% | 1,374 | 30.88% | 160 | 3.60% | 0 | 0.00% | 0 | 0.00% | 2 | 0.04% | 1,540 | 34.61% | 4,450 |
| Washington | 994 | 29.50% | 2,187 | 64.92% | 187 | 5.55% | 1 | 0.03% | 0 | 0.00% | 0 | 0.00% | -1,193 | -35.41% | 3,369 |
| Waukesha | 2,484 | 48.21% | 2,388 | 46.35% | 276 | 5.36% | 2 | 0.04% | 0 | 0.00% | 2 | 0.04% | 96 | 1.86% | 5,152 |
| Waupaca | 1,473 | 45.41% | 990 | 30.52% | 772 | 23.80% | 0 | 0.00% | 8 | 0.25% | 1 | 0.03% | 483 | 14.89% | 3,244 |
| Waushara | 1,282 | 66.74% | 257 | 13.38% | 377 | 19.63% | 0 | 0.00% | 5 | 0.26% | 0 | 0.00% | 905 | 47.11% | 1,921 |
| Winnebago | 2,068 | 32.82% | 2,238 | 35.52% | 1,887 | 29.95% | 77 | 1.22% | 31 | 0.49% | 0 | 0.00% | -170 | -2.70% | 6,301 |
| Wood | 247 | 23.64% | 196 | 18.76% | 601 | 57.51% | 0 | 0.00% | 0 | 0.00% | 1 | 0.10% | -354 | -33.87% | 1,045 |
| Total | 78,759 | 44.22% | 70,486 | 39.57% | 26,216 | 14.72% | 2,176 | 1.22% | 399 | 0.22% | 86 | 0.05% | 8,273 | 4.64% | 178,122 |

==== Counties that flipped from Democratic to Republican ====
- Buffalo
- Iowa
- Kenosha
- Oconto
- Racine
- St. Croix

==== Counties that flipped from Republican to Democratic ====
- Green Lake
- Winnebago

==== Counties that flipped from Republican to Greenback ====
- Clark

==== Counties that flipped from Democratic to Greenback ====
- Lincoln
- Wood

== Bibliography ==
- Nesbit, Robert C. (1985). Thompson, William Fletcher (ed.). The History of Wisconsin: Urbanization and Industrialization, 1873-1893. Vol. 3. Madison, Wis.: State Historical Society of Wisconsin. ISBN 0-87020-122-0.
