= 1881 Wisconsin gubernatorial election =

- November 8, 1881
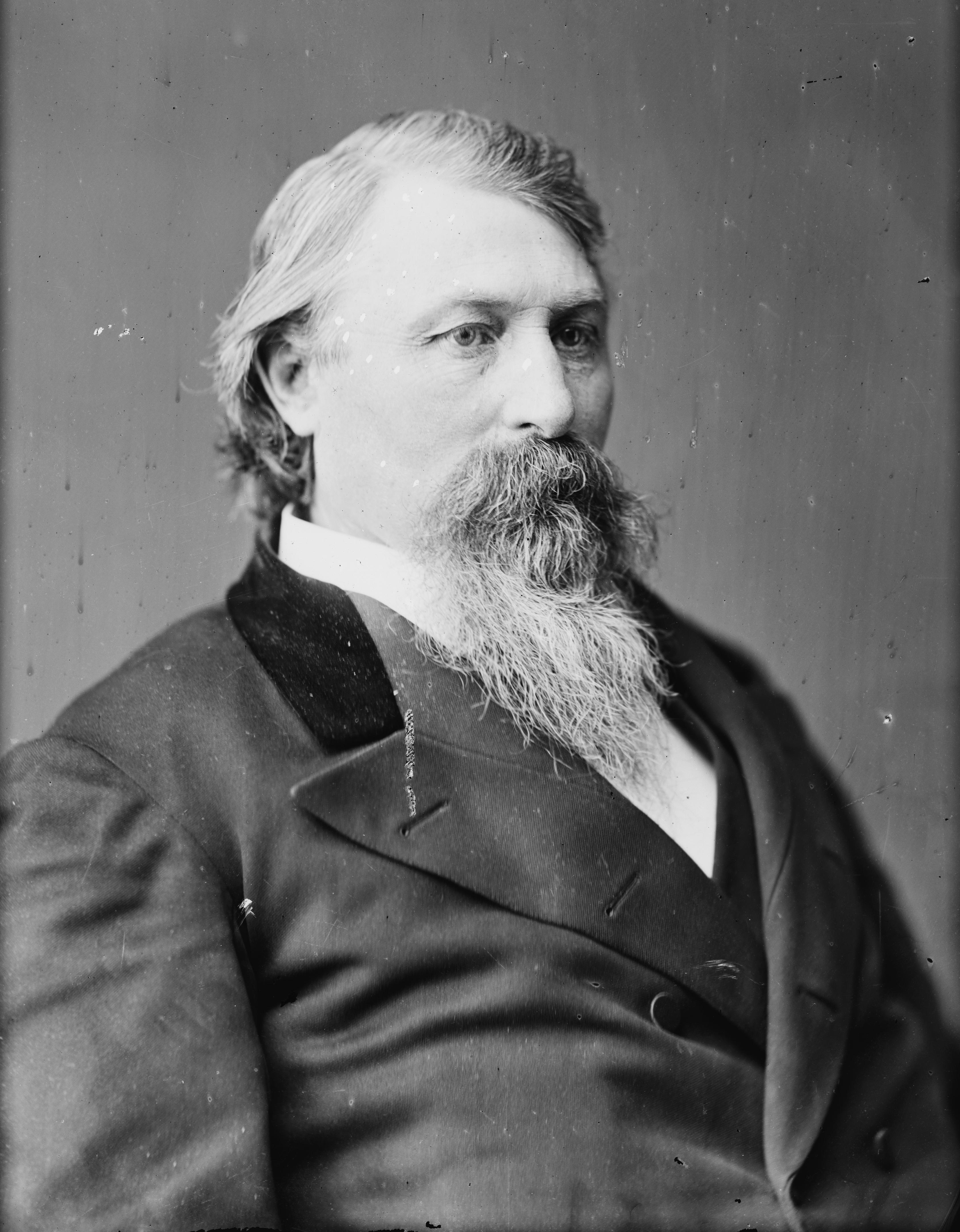

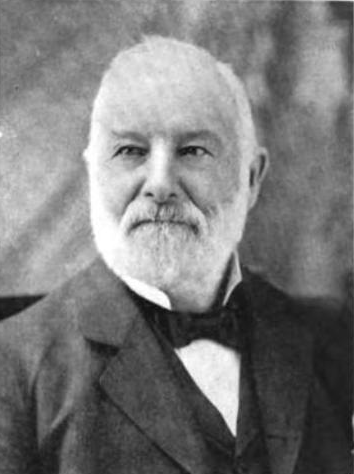

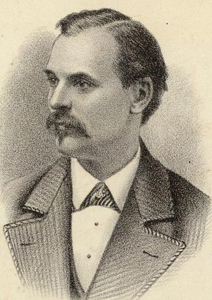
Nominee	Jeremiah McLain Rusk	Nicholas D. Fratt	Theodore D. Kanouse
Party	Republican	Democratic	Prohibition
Popular vote	81,754	69,797	13,225
Percentage	47.57%	40.61%	7.70%
- County results Rusk : 40–50% 50–60% 60–70% 70–80% >90% Fratt : 30–40% 40–50% 50–60% 60–70% 70–80%
Governor before election
William E. Smith
Republican
Elected Governor
Jeremiah McLain Rusk
Republican

The 1881 Wisconsin gubernatorial election was held on November 8, 1881.

Republican nominee Jeremiah McLain Rusk defeated Democratic nominee Nicholas D. Fratt and two other nominees with 47.57% of the vote.

This was the last Wisconsin gubernatorial election held in an odd-numbered year. In 1882, a constitutional amendment was carried moving gubernatorial elections to even-numbered years.

== General election ==
=== Candidates ===
Major party candidates

- Nicholas D. Fratt, Democratic, President of the Racine County Bank, Democratic nominee for Wisconsin's 1st congressional district in 1874
- Jeremiah McLain Rusk, Republican, former member of the United States House of Representatives

Other candidates

- Theodore D. Kanouse, Prohibition
- Edward P. Allis, Greenback, Greenback nominee for Governor of Wisconsin in 1877

=== Results ===
1881 Wisconsin gubernatorial election
Party	Candidate	Votes	%	±%
Republican	Jeremiah M. Rusk	81,754	47.57%	−5.62%
Democratic	Nicholas D. Fratt	69,797	40.61%	+0.92%
Prohibition	Theodore D. Kanouse	13,225	7.70%	+7.49%
Greenback	Edward P. Allis	7,002	4.07%	−2.80%
	Scattering	78	0.05%	
Majority		11,957	6.96%	
Total votes		171,856	100.00%	
Republican hold		Swing	-6.54%	

=== Results by county ===
Douglas County would note vote for a Democrat again until 1944 nor would St. Croix County until 1932. This was the last election until 1916 in which Iowa County would not back the winning candidate.

County	Jeremiah M. Rusk Republican		Nicholas D. Fratt Democratic		Theodore D. Kanouse Prohibition		Edward P. Allis Greenback		Scattering Write-in		Margin		Total votes cast
County	#	%	#	%	#	%	#	%	#	%	#	%	Total votes cast
Adams	599	74.60%	156	19.43%	43	5.35%	5	0.62%	0	0.00%	443	55.17%	803
Ashland	228	58.76%	154	39.69%	2	0.52%	4	1.03%	0	0.00%	74	19.07%	388
Barron	698	61.82%	298	26.40%	77	6.82%	49	4.34%	7	0.62%	400	35.43%	1,129
Bayfield	128	99.22%	1	0.78%	0	0.00%	0	0.00%	0	0.00%	127	98.45%	129
Brown	1,620	40.83%	2,084	52.52%	183	4.61%	79	1.99%	2	0.05%	-464	-11.69%	3,968
Buffalo	1,233	62.75%	624	31.76%	97	4.94%	11	0.56%	0	0.00%	609	30.99%	1,965
Burnett	556	92.36%	36	5.98%	4	0.66%	4	0.66%	2	0.33%	520	86.38%	602
Calumet	641	32.96%	1,051	54.04%	111	5.71%	141	7.25%	1	0.05%	-410	-21.08%	1,945
Chippewa	514	28.34%	889	49.01%	215	11.85%	196	10.80%	0	0.00%	-375	-20.67%	1,814
Clark	869	53.21%	447	27.37%	288	17.64%	29	1.78%	0	0.00%	422	25.84%	1,633
Columbia	1,656	47.64%	1,164	33.49%	634	18.24%	21	0.60%	1	0.03%	492	14.15%	3,476
Crawford	746	41.56%	636	35.43%	113	6.30%	299	16.66%	1	0.03%	110	6.13	1,795
Dane	3,210	41.17%	3,491	44.78%	968	12.42%	118	1.51%	9	0.12%	-281	-3.60%	7,796
Dodge	1,796	31.83%	3,319	58.82%	347	6.15%	178	3.15%	3	0.05%	-1,523	-26.99%	5,643
Door	866	68.35%	308	24.31%	9	0.71%	83	6.55%	1	0.08%	558	44.04%	1,267
Douglas	33	33.33%	62	62.63%	4	4.04%	0	0.00%	0	0.00%	-29	-29.29%	99
Dunn	1,126	54.77%	669	32.54%	239	11.62%	22	1.07%	0	0.00%	457	22.23%	2,056
Eau Claire	1,012	33.10%	1,325	43.34%	655	21.43%	64	2.09%	1	0.03%	-313	-10.24%	3,057
Fond du Lac	2,518	42.11%	2699	45.14%	200	3.35%	561	9.38%	1	0.02%	-181	-3.03%	5,979
Grant	2,512	57.56%	1,323	30.32%	405	9.28%	123	2.82%	1	0.02%	1,189	27.25%	4,364
Green	1,643	60.21%	674	24.70%	159	5.83%	253	9.27%	0	0.00%	969	35.51%	2,729
Green Lake	983	52.57%	624	33.37%	151	8.07%	112	5.99%	0	0.00%	359	19.20%	1,870
Iowa	1,377	42.02%	1,382	42.17%	504	15.38%	14	0.43%	0	0.00%	-5	-0.15%	3,277
Jackson	1,190	58.36%	522	25.60%	246	12.06%	80	3.92%	1	0.05%	668	32.76%	2,039
Jefferson	1,636	35.63%	2,360	51.39%	487	10.61%	109	2.37%	0	0.00%	-724	-15.77%	4,592
Juneau	986	41.52%	985	41.47%	354	14.91%	50	2.11%	0	0.00%	1	0.04%	2,375
Kenosha	1,172	54.08%	949	43.79%	45	2.08%	1	0.05%	0	0.00%	223	10.29%	2,167
Kewaunee	306	21.92%	1,087	77.87%	3	0.21%	0	0.00%	0	0.00%	-781	-55.95%	1,396
La Crosse	2,143	51.65%	1,598	38.52%	281	6.77%	123	2.96%	4	0.10%	545	13.14%	4,149
Lafayette	1,476	46.58%	1,425	44.97%	217	6.85%	50	1.58%	1	0.03%	51	1.61%	3,169
Langlade	131	61.50%	66	30.99%	0	0.00%	16	7.51%	0	0.00%	65	30.52%	213
Lincoln	254	57.73%	111	25.23%	0	0.00%	75	17.05%	0	0.00%	143	32.50%	440
Manitowoc	1,672	40.78%	2,411	58.80%	17	0.41%	0	0.00%	0	0.00%	-739	-18.02%	4,100
Marathon	696	29.90%	1,307	56.14%	80	3.44%	245	10.52%	0	0.00%	-611	-26.25%	2,328
Marinette	1,138	69.60%	448	27.40%	46	2.81%	1	0.06%	2	0.12%	690	42.20%	1,635
Marquette	495	36.18%	773	56.51%	100	7.31%	0	0.00%	0	0.00%	-278	-20.32%	1,368
Milwaukee	7,398	48.49%	6,989	45.81%	410	2.69%	460	3.01%	1	0.01%	409	2.68%	15,258
Monroe	1,520	50.96%	1,018	34.13%	257	8.62%	188	6.30%	0	0.00%	502	16.83%	2,983
Oconto	734	48.97%	556	37.09%	200	13.34%	9	0.60%	0	0.00%	178	11.87%	1,499
Outagamie	955	29.29%	1,753	53.76%	250	7.67%	303	9.29%	0	0.00%	-798	-24.47%	3,261
Ozaukee	413	24.63%	1,198	71.44%	7	0.42%	59	3.52%	0	0.00%	-785	-46.81%	1,677
Pepin	807	60.77%	316	23.80%	205	15.44%	0	0.00%	0	0.00%	491	36.97%	1,328
Pierce	865	48.46%	408	22.86%	479	26.83%	18	1.01%	15	0.84%	457	25.60%	1,785
Polk	1,105	73.57%	223	14.85%	161	10.72%	3	0.20%	10	0.67%	882	58.72%	1,502
Portage	1,080	48.56%	927	41.68%	189	8.50%	28	1.26%	0	0.00%	153	6.88%	2,224
Price	171	57.38%	125	41.95%	0	0.00%	2	0.67%	0	0.00%	46	15.44%	298
Racine	2,026	46.13%	2,023	46.06%	259	5.90%	84	1.91%	0	0.00%	3	0.07%	4,392
Richland	1,383	55.72%	686	27.64%	185	7.45%	226	9.11%	2	0.08%	697	28.08%	2,482
Rock	2,783	57.79%	1,276	26.50%	630	13.08%	127	2.64%	0	0.00%	1,507	31.29%	4,816
Sauk	1,694	49.16%	1,084	31.46%	551	15.99%	117	3.40%	0	0.00%	610	17.70%	3,446
Shawano	500	49.75%	462	45.97%	34	3.38%	5	0.50%	4	0.40%	38	3.78%	1,005
Sheboygan	1,999	44.55%	2,055	45.80%	67	1.49%	366	8.16%	0	0.00%	-56	-1.25%	4,487
St. Croix	1,183	40.44%	1,357	46.39%	381	13.03%	4	0.14%	0	0.00%	-174	-5.95%	2,925
Taylor	354	53.15%	292	43.84%	15	2.25%	5	0.75%	0	0.00%	62	9.31%	666
Trempealeau	1,219	69.62%	249	14.22%	82	4.68%	201	11.48%	0	0.00%	970	55.40%	1,751
Vernon	2,022	70.60%	358	12.50%	153	5.34%	326	11.38%	5	0.17%	1,664	58.10%	2,864
Walworth	2,325	64.39%	876	24.26%	311	8.61%	99	2.74%	0	0.00%	1,449	40.13%	3,611
Washington	1,217	39.22%	1,732	55.82%	66	2.13%	88	2.84%	0	0.00%	-515	-16.60%	3,103
Waukesha	1,841	39.34%	2,233	47.71%	476	10.17%	128	2.74%	2	0.04%	-392	-8.38%	4,680
Waupaca	1,779	58.08%	885	28.89%	119	3.89%	280	9.14%	0	0.00%	894	29.19%	3,063
Waushara	1,571	79.79%	267	13.56%	71	3.61%	60	3.05%	0	0.00%	1,304	66.23%	1,969
Winnebago	2,499	43.89%	2,494	43.80%	326	5.73%	374	6.57%	1	0.02%	5	0.09%	5,694
Wood	452	33.93%	497	37.31%	57	4.28%	326	24.47%	0	0.00%	-45	-3.38%	1,332
Total	81,754	47.57%	69,797	40.61%	13,225	7.70%	7,002	4.07%	78	0.05%	11,957	6.96%	171,856

==== Counties that flipped from Democratic to Republican ====
- Price
- Shawano

==== Counties that flipped from Republican to Democratic ====
- Chippewa
- Dane
- Douglas
- Eau Claire
- Iowa
- St. Croix
- Waukesha
- Wood

== Bibliography ==
- Glashan, Roy R. (1979). American Governors and Gubernatorial Elections, 1775-1978. Meckler Books. ISBN 0-930466-17-9.
- Gubernatorial Elections, 1787-1997. Washington, D.C.: Congressional Quarterly Inc. 1998. ISBN 1-56802-396-0.
