= Edward P. Allis (businessman) =

American businessman

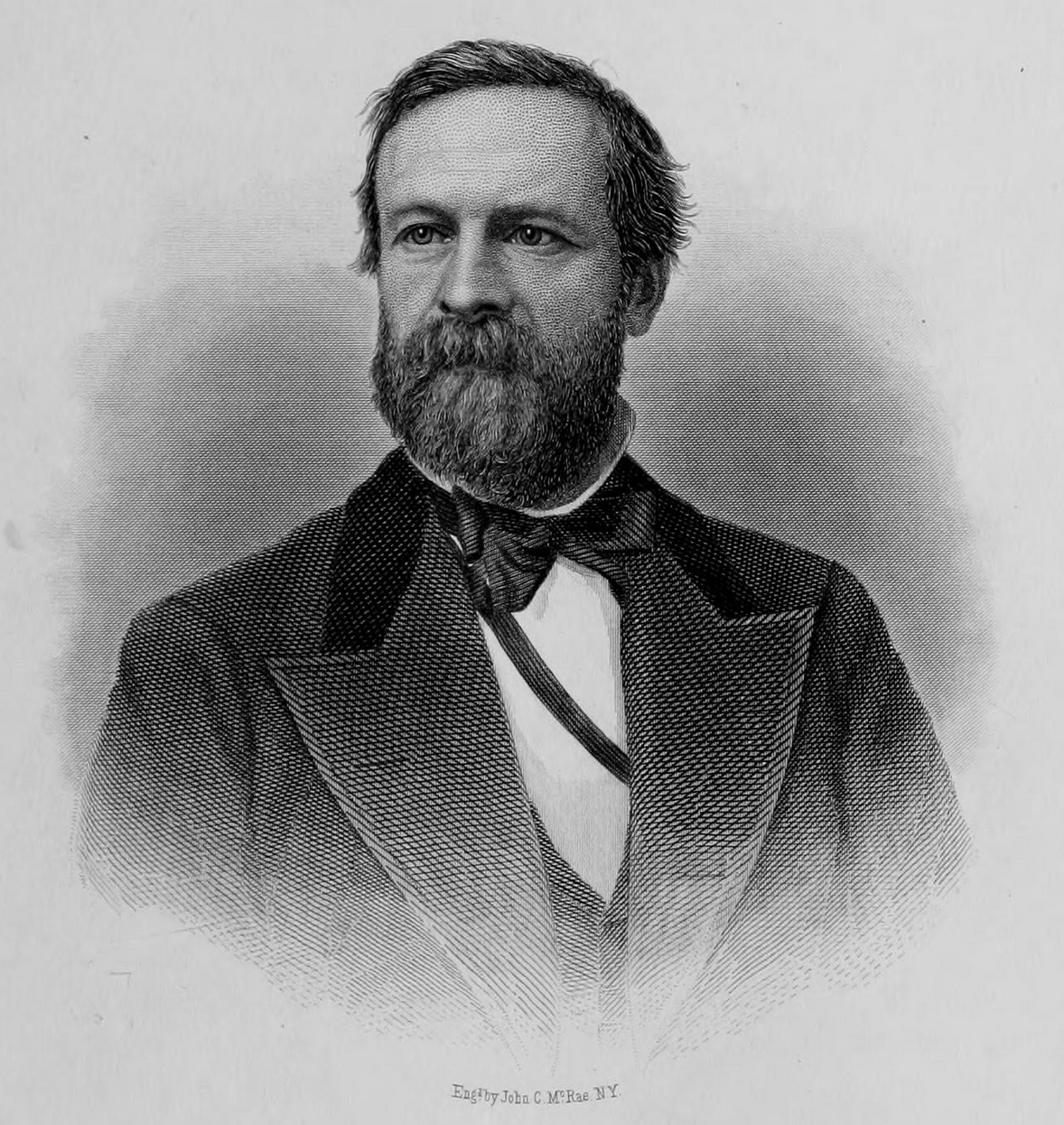
- Born: May 12, 1824; Cazenovia, New York, U.S.
- Died: April 1, 1889 (aged 64); Milwaukee, Wisconsin, U.S.
- Resting place: Forest Home Cemetery; Milwaukee, Wisconsin
- Occupations: Industrialist, civil engineer
- Known for: Founder of company that became Allis-Chalmers Manufacturing Company
- Political party: Greenback (1877–1881); Republican

Signature
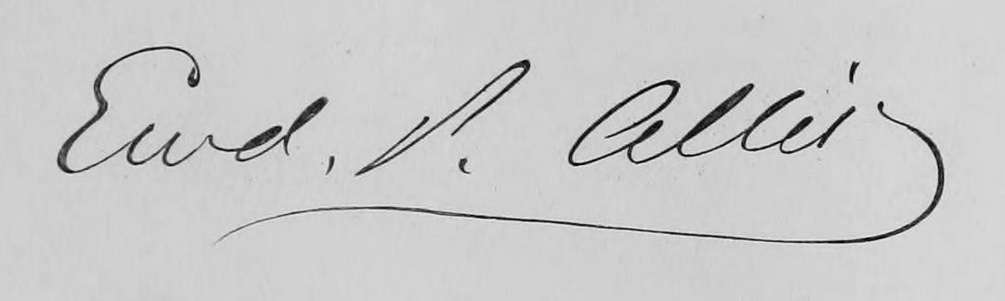

Edward Phelps Allis (May 12, 1824 – April 1, 1889) was an American businessman who founded the Edward P. Allis Company, a manufacturer of milling and mining equipment, steam engines, and other large-scale capital equipment. He was a notable ideologue in the Greenback Movement, running for governor of Wisconsin as a candidate of the Greenback Party. About a decade after his death, his company merged with others to form the Allis-Chalmers Manufacturing Company. In 1883, Allis was elected a fellow of the American Society of Civil Engineers.

== Early life and business career ==
Allis was born on May 12, 1824, in Cazenovia, New York. A graduate of Union College in 1845, Allis moved to Milwaukee, Wisconsin, in 1846 and started a leather company with a tannery in Two Rivers. In 1856 he sold out to his partners, and for a period of time, he was out of business, until 1860 when he purchased an iron products manufacturing company. The company grew rapidly and by 1867 had built a large manufacturing works on the near south side on Florida Street. Most of the early business involved making flour mill apparatus, Wisconsin at that time being a leading wheat-producing state. The south-side facility was known as the "Reliance Works" which became the brand name for these products. Eventually, the Edward P. Allis Company expanded into steam engines, sawmill equipment, iron piping, and other products.

In 1878 and 1879, the company built roller flour mills for Cadwallader Washburn's Washburn-Crosby mills and Charles A. Pillsbury's mills. These installations represented a significant new change in flour production in the United States, leading to the predominance of Pillsbury Best and Gold Medal flour brands and to a major shift in wheat cultivation to states west of the Mississippi. Between 1879 and 1889, the Reliance Works manufactured 50,000 flour mill rolls used in "new process" milling, selling them to mills worldwide.

== Political activity ==
Allis was a leading figure of the Greenback Party, which was named for the fact that the party favored issuance of paper money ("greenbacks") as issued originally during the American Civil War. Allis, who up until that time was a Republican, catapulted to prominence in November 1875 when he wrote a letter to the Milwaukee Sentinel in which he expressed the view that government financial policy was ruining the prosperity brought about in the wake of the war. After expressing these views, he was recruited into Milwaukee's Greenback Club and was the Greenback Party candidate for Governor of Wisconsin in 1877 and 1881. He was also an unsuccessful candidate for nomination as the party's presidential candidate in 1880. After the party collapsed, Allis was never otherwise involved in politics.

== Personal life ==
Allis married Margaret Watson of Geneva, New York, in 1848. He died on April 1, 1889, and is buried in Milwaukee. He was survived by his wife and eleven children. One of his children, also called Edward Phelps Allis, was a leading anatomist and evolutionary morphologist. His grandson, William Allis, became a noted physicist.

== Legacy ==
In 1901 the Edward P. Allis Company merged with the Fraser and Chalmers Company, becoming Allis-Chalmers Manufacturing Company, which continued to predominate in large scale industrial equipment and agricultural machinery for many decades. West Allis, Wisconsin, is named after the fact that Allis-Chalmers built a new large manufacturing facility at that location shortly after the founding of the merged company. In 1883, Allis was elected a fellow of the American Society of Civil Engineers.

Party political offices
Preceded by Party established	Greenback nominee for Governor of Wisconsin; 1877	Succeeded by Reuben May
Preceded by Reuben May	Greenback nominee for Governor of Wisconsin; 1881	Succeeded by William L. Utley
