= Jeremiah M. Rusk =

American politician (1830–1893)

Jeremiah Rusk
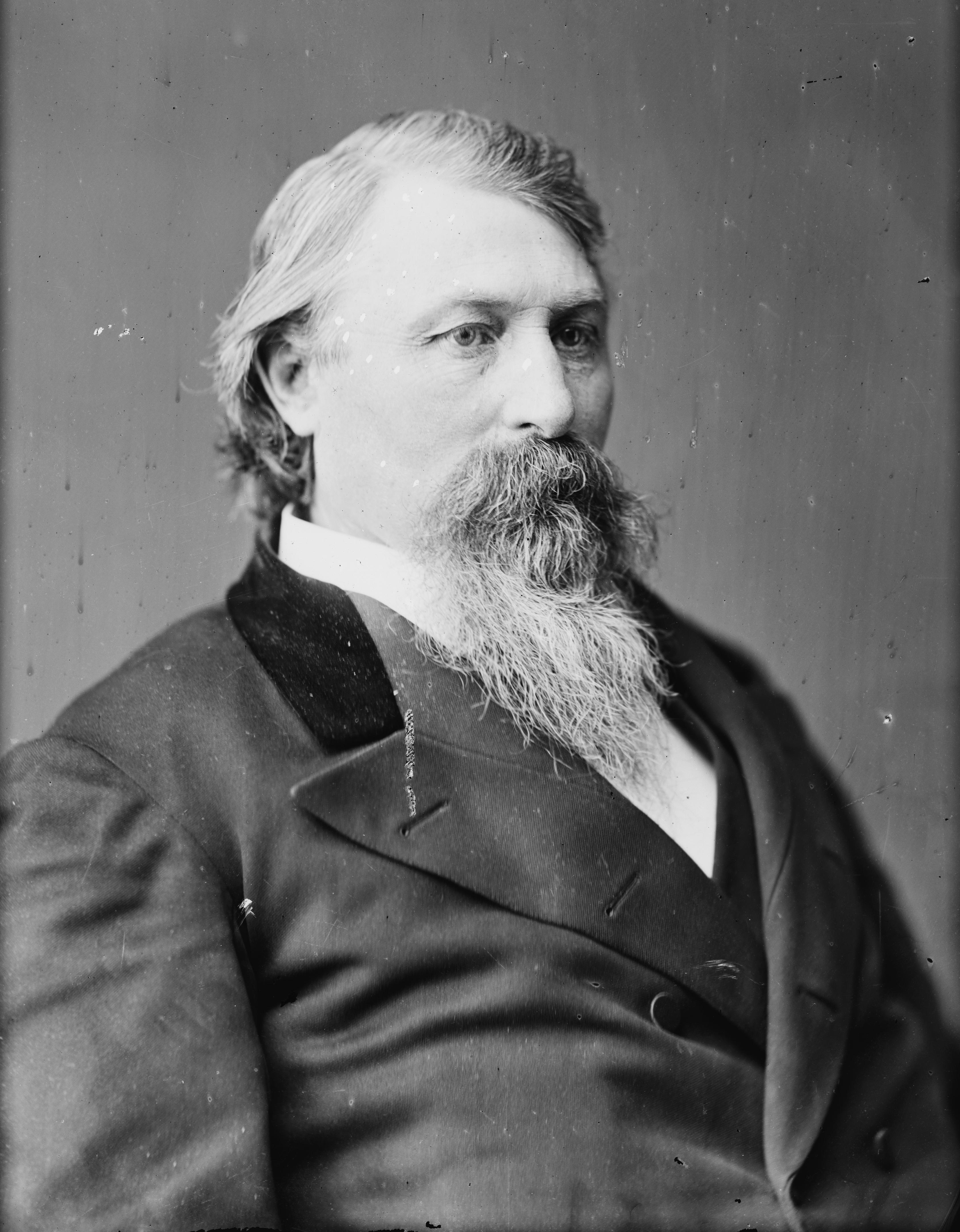
- Rusk c. 1870–80

2nd United States Secretary of Agriculture
- In office March 6, 1889 – March 6, 1893
- President: Benjamin Harrison; Grover Cleveland
- Preceded by: Norman Coleman
- Succeeded by: Julius Morton

15th Governor of Wisconsin
- In office January 2, 1882 – January 7, 1889
- Lieutenant: Sam Fifield; George Ryland
- Preceded by: William E. Smith
- Succeeded by: William D. Hoard

Member of the U.S. House of Representatives from Wisconsin's 7th district
- In office March 4, 1873 – March 3, 1877
- Preceded by: Constituency established
- Succeeded by: Herman L. Humphrey

Member of the U.S. House of Representatives from Wisconsin's 6th district
- In office March 4, 1871 – March 3, 1873
- Preceded by: Cadwallader C. Washburn
- Succeeded by: Philetus Sawyer

6th Bank Comptroller of Wisconsin
- In office January 1, 1866 – January 3, 1870
- Governor: Lucius Fairchild
- Preceded by: William Ramsey
- Succeeded by: Position abolished

Member of the Wisconsin State Assembly from the Bad Ax 2nd district
- In office January 6, 1862 – January 5, 1863
- Preceded by: Daniel Harris Johnson (Bad Ax–Crawford)
- Succeeded by: Daniel B. Priest (Vernon 2nd)

Personal details
- Born: Jeremiah McLain Rusk; June 17, 1830 Malta, Ohio, U.S.
- Died: November 21, 1893 (aged 63) Viroqua, Wisconsin, U.S.
- Resting place: Viroqua Cemetery, Viroqua, Wisconsin
- Party: Republican
- Spouses: Mary Martin (m. 1849; died 1856); Elizabeth Marie Johnson (m. 1856–1893)
- Children: 6
- Relatives: Allen Rusk (brother)

Military service
- Branch/service: United States Volunteers; Union Army
- Years of service: 1862–1865
- Rank: Lieutenant Colonel; Brevet Brig. General
- Unit: 25th Reg. Wis. Vol. Infantry
- Battles/wars: American Civil War

Jeremiah McLain Rusk (June 17, 1830 – November 21, 1893) was an American politician. A Republican, he was the second United States secretary of agriculture (1889–1893) and the 15th governor of Wisconsin (1882–1889), and served three terms in the United States House of Representatives (1871–1877), representing northwest Wisconsin. He also served as a Union Army officer during the American Civil War, served one term in the Wisconsin State Assembly (1862), and was the last Bank Comptroller of Wisconsin (1866–1870) before the office was abolished.

== Biography ==
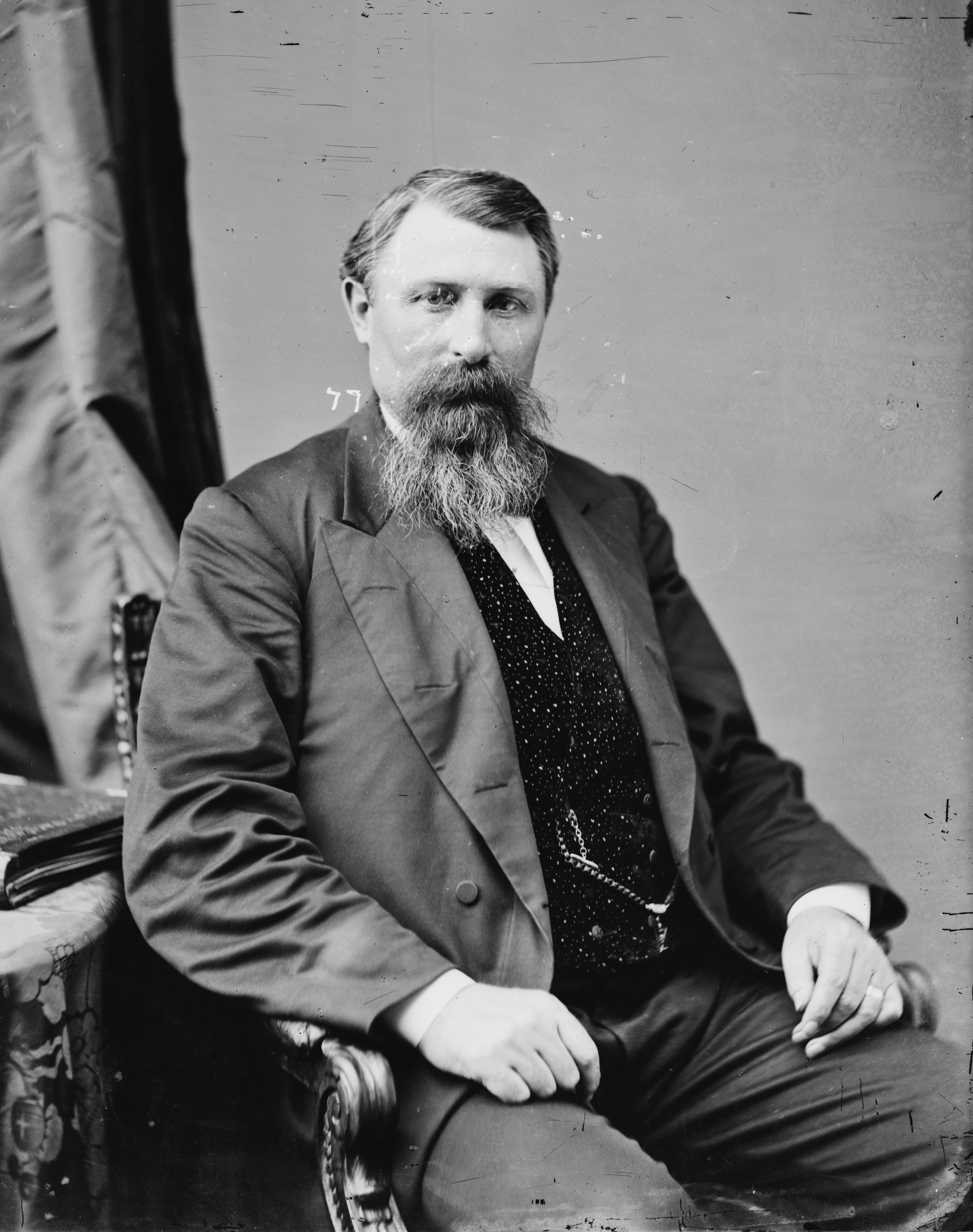
Rusk c. 1860–75

Rusk was born in Malta, Ohio, the younger brother of Allen Rusk. He was a member of the Republican Party. He began as a planter, then turned to innkeeping and finally to banking before the American Civil War.

Rusk started his service with the Union Army during Civil War as major of the 25th Wisconsin Volunteer Infantry Regiment on August 14, 1862. He was promoted to lieutenant colonel on September 16, 1863. He took command of the regiment on July 22, 1864, when Colonel Milton Montgomery was wounded and captured at Decatur, Georgia during the Battle of Atlanta. He continued in command after Montgomery was exchanged because Montgomery was given command of the brigade to which the 25th Wisconsin Infantry was assigned. Rusk was wounded at Salkehatchie River, Georgia on January 20, 1865. Rusk was mustered out of the volunteers on June 7, 1865. He received an appointment as brevet colonel to rank from March 13, 1865. On February 24, 1866, President Andrew Johnson nominated Rusk for appointment to the grade of brevet brigadier general of volunteers to rank from March 13, 1865, and the United States Senate confirmed the appointment on April 10, 1866.

After the Civil War, he became a congressman in the United States House of Representatives. He was elected to the Forty-second United States Congress as the representative of Wisconsin's 6th congressional district serving from March 4, 1871, to March 3, 1873. For the Forty-third Congress he redistricted and was elected as representative of Wisconsin's newly created 7th District. He was reelected to the Forty-fourth Congress as well serving from March 4, 1873, to March 3, 1877. While in congress, he was chairman of the Committee on Invalid Pensions (Forty-third congress). After his terms in congress he ran as a Republican for Governor of Wisconsin, an election he won. His most noted act during his governorship was when he sent the National Guard into Milwaukee to keep the May Day Labor Strikes of 1886 under control. The strikers had shut down every business in the city except the North Chicago Rolling Mills in Bay View. The guardsmen's orders were that, if the strikers were to enter the Mills, they should shoot to kill. But when the captain received the order it had a different meaning: he ordered his men to pick out a man and shoot to kill when the order was given. This led to the Bay View Tragedy, in which 7 workers were killed.

In 1889, after the end of his third term as governor, he accepted the new cabinet position of secretary of agriculture in the Benjamin Harrison administration. He lived, died and was buried in Viroqua, Wisconsin. Rusk County, Wisconsin was named after Rusk. It was originally Gates County but changed its name in 1905.

== Personal life and legacy ==
Jeremiah McLain Rusk was the youngest of seven children born to Daniel Rusk and his wife Jane (née Faulkner). Rusk's elder brother Allen Rusk also served in the Wisconsin State Assembly and in the Union Army during the Civil War.

Jeremiah McLain Rusk married twice. His first wife was Mary Martin, who he married in 1849. They had two children together before her death in 1856. Later that year, Rusk married Elizabeth Marie "Berthe" Johnson, with whom he had four more children, though one died young. His second wife survived him.

His eldest son was Lycurgus James Rusk, was a lawyer and worked as private secretary to his father; he also went on to serve in the Wisconsin State Assembly and was a prominent member of the Wisconsin bar.

The house he bought and lived in while Governor of Wisconsin, now known as the Old Executive Mansion, was used by the state as the official residence of the Governor for several decades and is listed on the National Register of Historic Places.

== See also ==
- List of American Civil War brevet generals (Union)

Party political offices
Preceded by William E. Smith	Republican nominee for Governor of Wisconsin; 1881, 1884, 1886	Succeeded by William D. Hoard
Wisconsin State Assembly
Preceded by Daniel Harris Johnson (Bad Ax–Crawford)	Member of the Wisconsin State Assembly from Bad Ax 2nd district January 6, 1862 – January 5, 1863	Succeeded by Daniel B. Priest (Vernon 2nd)
U.S. House of Representatives
Preceded by Cadwallader C. Washburn	Member of the U.S. House of Representatives from Wisconsin's 6th congressional district 1871–1873	Succeeded by Philetus Sawyer
New constituency	Member of the U.S. House of Representatives from Wisconsin's 7th congressional district 1873–1877	Succeeded by Herman L. Humphrey
Political offices
Preceded by William Ramsey	Bank Comptroller of Wisconsin; January 1, 1866 – January 3, 1870	Position abolished
Preceded by William E. Smith	Governor of Wisconsin; 1882–1889	Succeeded by William D. Hoard
Government offices
Preceded by Norman Coleman	United States Secretary of Agriculture; 1889–1893	Succeeded by Julius Morton
