= 1932 Wisconsin gubernatorial election =

- November 8, 1932
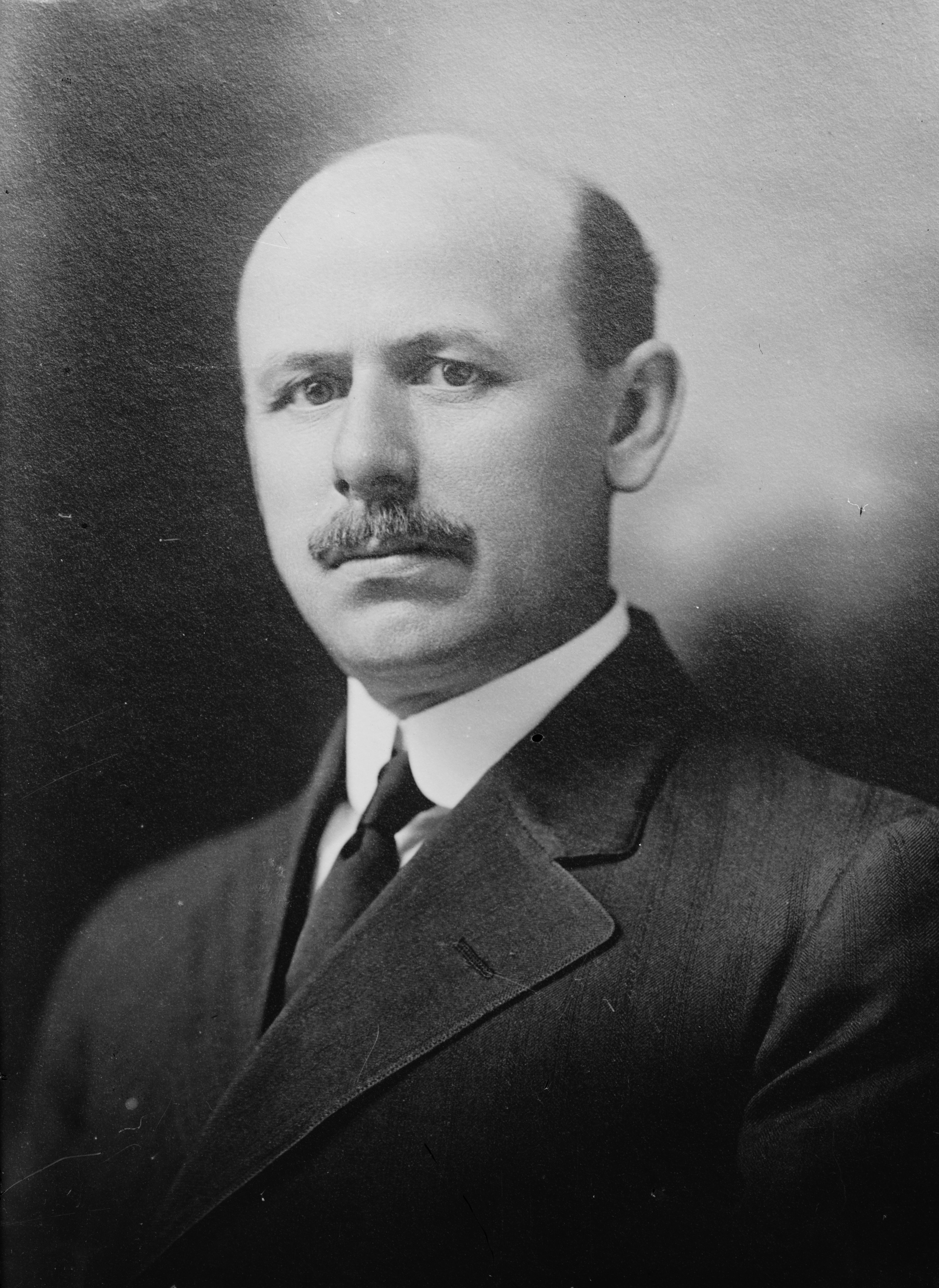

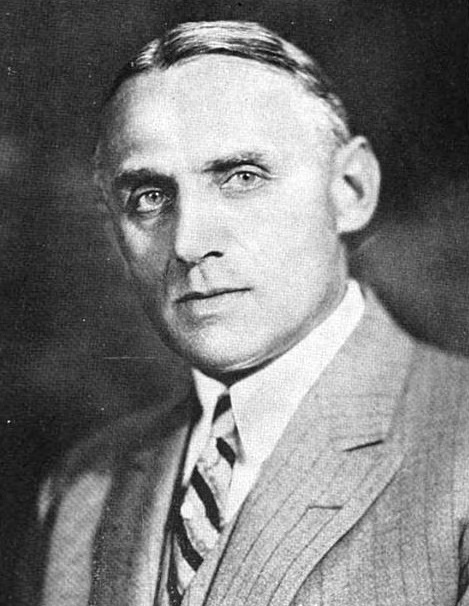

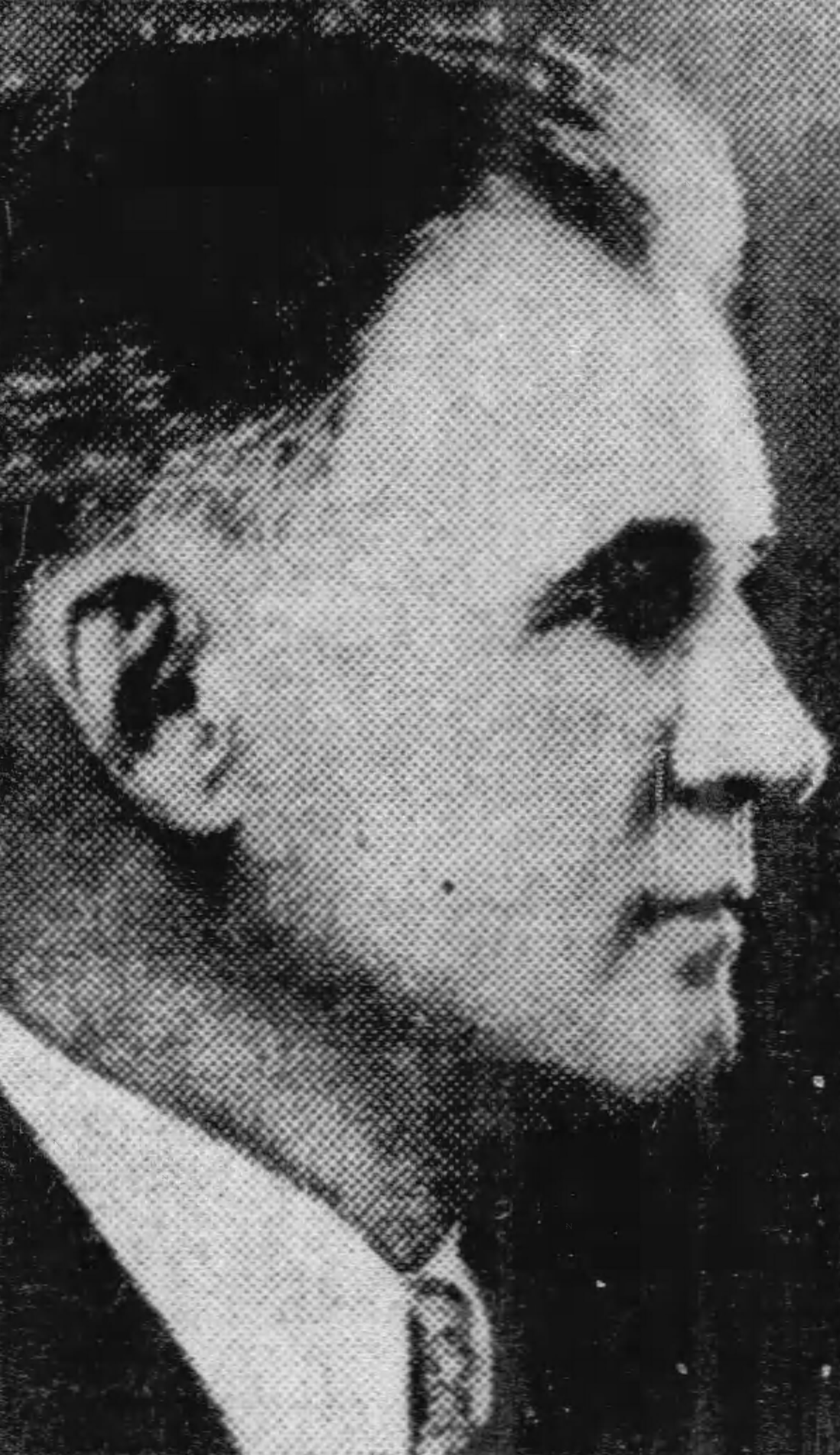
Nominee	Albert G. Schmedeman	Walter J. Kohler Sr.	Frank Metcalfe
Party	Democratic	Republican	Social-Democratic
Popular vote	590,114	470,805	56,965
Percentage	52.48%	41.87%	5.07%
- County results Schmedeman: 40–50% 50–60% 60–70% 70–80% Kohler: 40–50% 50–60% 60–70%
Governor before election
Philip La Follette
Republican
Elected Governor
Albert G. Schmedeman
Democratic

The 1932 Wisconsin gubernatorial election was held on November 8, 1932. Incumbent Republican Governor Philip La Follette was defeated in the Republican primary, and in the midst of the Great Depression and nationwide voter dissatisfaction with the Republican Party, Democratic nominee Albert G. Schmedeman defeated Republican nominee Walter J. Kohler Sr. and Social-Democratic nominee Frank Metcalfe with 52.48% of the vote. Schmedeman became the first Democrat to win a gubernatorial election in Wisconsin since George Wilbur Peck in 1892. Two years later, in 1934, La Follette would run for governor again and defeated Schmedeman, this time running with the Progressive Party.

This was the only Democratic victory in a Wisconsin gubernatorial election between 1892 and 1958. As of 2022, this is the most recent gubernatorial election in which Juneau, Shawano, and Waupaca have voted for a Democratic candidate.

Primary elections were held on September 20, 1932.

== Republican party ==
=== Candidates ===
==== Nominee ====
- Walter J. Kohler Sr., former Governor

==== Eliminated in primary ====
- Philip La Follette, incumbent Governor

=== Results ===
Republican primary results
Party	Candidate	Votes	%
Republican	Walter J. Kohler Sr.	414,575	56.45%
Republican	Philip La Follette (incumbent)	319,884	43.55%
Total votes		734,459	100.00%

== Democratic primary ==
=== Candidates ===
==== Nominee ====
- Albert G. Schmedeman, mayor of Madison and Democratic nominee for governor in 1928

==== Eliminated in primary ====
- Leo P. Fox, Democratic nominee for Wisconsin's 6th congressional district in 1920 and for lieutenant governor in 1928
- William B. Rubin, attorney

=== Results ===
Democratic primary results
Party	Candidate	Votes	%
Democratic	Albert G. Schmedeman	58,098	44.04%
Democratic	William B. Rubin	44,556	33.77%
Democratic	Leo P. Fox	29,276	22.19%
Total votes		131,930	100.00%

== Social-Democratic party ==
=== Nominee ===
- Frank Metcalfe, nominee for governor in 1930

=== Results ===
Social-Democratic primary results
Party	Candidate	Votes	%
Social-Democratic	Frank Metcalfe	31,836	100.00%
Total votes		31,836	100.00%

== Prohibition party ==
=== Candidates ===
==== Nominee ====
- William C. Dean, Prohibition nominee for governor in 1918

==== Eliminated in primary ====
- Adolph R. Bucknam, Prohibition nominee for U.S. Senate in 1922 and for governor in 1924 and 1928

==== Results ====
Prohibition primary results
Party	Candidate	Votes	%
Prohibition	William C. Dean	717	53.79%
Prohibition	Adolph R. Bucknam	616	46.21%
Total votes		1,333	100.00%

== General election ==
=== Candidates ===
Major party candidates

- Albert G. Schmedeman, Democratic
- Walter J. Kohler Sr., Republican

Other candidates

- Fred B. Blair, Communist, nominee for governor in 1930
- William C. Dean, Prohibition
- Frank Metcalfe, Social-Democratic
- Joseph Ehrhardt, Socialist Labor, nominee for governor in 1928

=== Results ===
1932 Wisconsin gubernatorial election
Party	Candidate	Votes	%	±%
Democratic	Albert G. Schmedeman	590,114	52.48%	+24.46%
Republican	Walter J. Kohler Sr.	470,805	41.87%	−22.89%
Social-Democratic	Frank Metcalfe	56,965	5.07%	+0.85%
Prohibition	William C. Dean	3,148	0.28%	−2.16%
Communist (Note: "Independent Communist")	Fred Basset Blair	2,926	0.26%	−0.23%
Socialist Labor (Note: "Independent Socialist Labor")	Joseph Ehrhardt	398	0.04%	
	Scattering (Note: These are not listed in the Blue Book but are listed in the Board of Canvassers report.)	146	0.01%	
Majority		119,309	10.61%	
Turnout		1,124,502	100.00%	
Democratic gain from Republican		Swing	+47.35%	

=== Results by county ===
Schmedeman's victory ended many long streaks of Republican victories in counties throughout the state. In particular, Schmedeman was the first Democrat to ever win Barron County, Burnett County, Grant County, Iron County, Rusk County, and Trempealeau County. He was also the first Democrat since William A. Barstow in 1853 to win Adams County and Vernon County along with the first since Barstow in 1855 to win Waupaca County. Additionally, Clark County, Jackson County, and Lafayette County voted Democratic for the first time since 1873. This election saw Marinette County back the losing the candidate for the first time ever.

Columbia County, Grant County, Green County, Iowa County, Lafayette County, and Sauk County would not vote Democratic again until 2002, nor would Monroe County until 2006.

County	Albert G. Schmedeman Democratic		Walter J. Kohler Sr. Republican		Frank Metcalfe Social-Democratic		All Others Various		Margin		Total votes cast
County	#	%	#	%	#	%	#	%	#	%	Total votes cast
Adams	1,601	55.96%	1,211	42.33%	26	0.91%	23	0.80%	390	13.63%	2,861
Ashland	5,044	58.88%	3,342	39.01%	83	0.97%	97	1.13%	1,702	19.87%	8,566
Barron	6,858	58.79%	4,536	38.88%	147	1.26%	125	1.07%	2,322	19.90%	11,666
Bayfield	2,600	48.84%	2,478	46.55%	114	2.14%	131	2.46%	122	2.29%	5,323
Brown	15,206	54.91%	12,046	43.50%	367	1.33%	76	0.27%	3,160	11.41%	27,695
Buffalo	2,827	57.17%	2,079	42.04%	16	0.32%	23	0.47%	748	15.13%	4,945
Burnett	2,127	57.02%	1,496	40.11%	53	1.42%	54	1.45%	631	16.92%	3,730
Calumet	4,992	71.76%	1,879	27.01%	61	0.88%	25	0.36%	3,113	44.75%	6,957
Chippewa	7,383	54.27%	6,084	44.73%	81	0.60%	55	0.40%	1,299	9.55%	13,603
Clark	7,279	61.05%	4,251	35.65%	230	1.93%	163	1.37%	3,028	25.40%	11,923
Columbia	7,873	56.91%	5,861	42.36%	54	0.39%	47	0.34%	2,012	14.54%	13,835
Crawford	4,333	64.61%	2,325	34.67%	14	0.21%	34	0.51%	2,008	29.94%	6,706
Dane	24,536	51.33%	22,280	46.61%	831	1.74%	155	0.32%	2,256	4.72%	47,802
Dodge	14,333	66.84%	6,846	31.93%	214	1.00%	50	0.23%	7,487	34.92%	21,443
Door	3,009	45.65%	3,493	52.99%	37	0.56%	53	0.80%	-484	-7.34%	6,592
Douglas	8,341	44.94%	9,452	50.92%	510	2.75%	259	1.40%	-1,111	-5.99%	18,562
Dunn	4,203	47.42%	4,522	51.02%	81	0.91%	57	0.64%	-319	-3.60%	8,863
Eau Claire	6,359	41.48%	8,810	57.46%	86	0.56%	77	0.50%	-2,451	-15.99%	15,332
Florence	789	46.44%	849	49.97%	38	2.24%	23	1.35%	-60	-3.53%	1,699
Fond du Lac	13,935	54.90%	11,127	43.84%	214	0.84%	105	0.41%	2,808	11.06%	25,381
Forest	2,243	66.28%	1,096	32.39%	22	0.65%	23	0.68%	1,147	33.89%	3,384
Grant	8,656	54.19%	7,168	44.88%	59	0.37%	89	0.56%	1,488	9.32%	15,972
Green	4,862	55.21%	3,824	43.42%	62	0.70%	58	0.66%	1,038	11.79%	8,806
Green Lake	3,782	55.78%	2,948	43.48%	29	0.43%	21	0.31%	834	12.30%	6,780
Iowa	4,520	55.69%	3,523	43.41%	20	0.25%	53	0.65%	997	12.28%	8,116
Iron	1,554	46.58%	1,550	46.46%	59	1.77%	173	5.19%	4	0.12%	3,336
Jackson	3,282	56.61%	2,405	41.48%	55	0.95%	56	0.97%	877	15.13%	5,798
Jefferson	10,283	61.15%	6,437	38.28%	77	0.46%	20	0.12%	3,846	22.87%	16,817
Juneau	3,722	55.97%	2,824	42.47%	53	0.80%	51	0.77%	898	13.50%	6,650
Kenosha	11,526	48.12%	10,305	43.02%	1,883	7.86%	240	1.00%	1,221	5.10%	23,954
Kewaunee	4,278	70.43%	1,762	29.01%	19	0.31%	15	0.25%	2,516	41.42%	6,074
La Crosse	10,194	48.34%	10,766	51.06%	65	0.31%	61	0.29%	-572	-2.71%	21,086
Lafayette	4,677	56.22%	3,593	43.19%	22	0.26%	27	0.32%	1,084	13.03%	8,319
Langlade	5,256	59.06%	3,498	39.30%	110	1.24%	36	0.40%	1,758	19.75%	8,900
Lincoln	4,544	53.57%	3,816	44.98%	69	0.81%	54	0.64%	728	8.58%	8,483
Manitowoc	13,816	65.25%	7,029	33.20%	276	1.30%	52	0.25%	6,787	32.05%	21,173
Marathon	15,462	62.22%	8,850	35.61%	493	1.98%	47	0.19%	6,612	26.61%	24,852
Marinette	5,036	40.80%	7,009	56.79%	252	2.04%	46	0.37%	-1,973	-15.98%	12,343
Marquette	2,207	54.67%	1,801	44.61%	16	0.40%	13	0.32%	406	10.06%	4,037
Milwaukee	131,158	49.86%	87,911	33.42%	42,404	16.12%	1,570	0.60%	43,247	16.44%	263,043
Monroe	6,147	60.90%	3,807	37.72%	55	0.54%	85	0.84%	2,340	23.18%	10,094
Oconto	5,651	57.93%	4,008	41.09%	57	0.58%	39	0.40%	1,643	16.84%	9,755
Oneida	3,846	56.42%	2,729	40.03%	213	3.12%	29	0.43%	1,117	16.39%	6,817
Outagamie	13,353	52.33%	11,866	46.50%	236	0.92%	64	0.25%	1,487	5.83%	25,519
Ozaukee	5,004	69.33%	2,071	28.69%	132	1.83%	11	0.15%	2,933	40.63%	7,218
Pepin	1,606	52.90%	1,401	46.15%	17	0.56%	12	0.40%	205	6.75%	3,036
Pierce	3,650	47.35%	3,717	48.22%	254	3.29%	88	1.14%	-67	-0.87%	7,709
Polk	5,142	54.85%	3,999	42.66%	131	1.40%	102	1.09%	1,143	12.19%	9,374
Portage	7,205	55.92%	5,552	43.09%	85	0.66%	43	0.33%	1,653	12.83%	12,885
Price	3,620	55.74%	2,606	40.13%	129	1.99%	139	2.14%	1,014	15.61%	6,494
Racine	15,956	47.24%	15,344	45.43%	2,176	6.44%	299	0.89%	612	1.81%	33,775
Richland	3,448	45.42%	4,042	53.24%	31	0.41%	71	0.94%	-594	-7.82%	7,592
Rock	10,734	35.17%	19,367	63.45%	285	0.93%	136	0.45%	-8,633	-28.28%	30,522
Rusk	2,636	49.24%	2,485	46.42%	166	3.10%	66	1.23%	151	2.82%	5,353
Sauk	7,000	54.30%	5,761	44.69%	50	0.39%	81	0.63%	1,239	9.61%	12,892
Sawyer	1,952	53.61%	1,599	43.92%	67	1.84%	23	0.63%	353	9.70%	3,641
Shawano	6,914	65.38%	3,349	31.67%	236	2.23%	76	0.72%	3,565	33.71%	10,575
Sheboygan	12,419	45.89%	13,661	50.48%	860	3.18%	124	0.46%	-1,242	-4.59%	27,064
St. Croix	6,312	58.74%	4,263	39.67%	94	0.87%	77	0.72%	2,049	19.07%	10,746
Taylor	3,667	62.03%	1,580	26.73%	621	10.50%	44	0.74%	2,087	35.30%	5,912
Trempealeau	5,286	60.78%	3,302	37.97%	70	0.80%	39	0.45%	1,984	22.81%	8,697
Vernon	5,365	58.93%	3,638	39.96%	35	0.38%	66	0.72%	1,727	18.97%	9,104
Vilas	1,351	41.40%	1,783	54.64%	43	1.32%	86	2.64%	-432	-13.24%	3,263
Walworth	5,338	35.46%	9,585	63.68%	78	0.52%	52	0.35%	-4,247	-28.21%	15,053
Washburn	2,256	53.83%	1,785	42.59%	104	2.48%	46	1.10%	471	11.24%	4,191
Washington	7,707	68.67%	3,350	29.85%	146	1.30%	21	0.19%	4,357	38.82%	11,224
Waukesha	10,772	47.10%	11,619	50.81%	423	1.85%	55	0.24%	-847	-3.70%	22,869
Waupaca	7,079	51.17%	6,502	47.00%	188	1.36%	66	0.48%	577	4.17%	13,835
Waushara	2,803	48.76%	2,866	49.85%	35	0.61%	45	0.78%	-63	-1.10%	5,749
Winnebago	13,241	46.72%	14,501	51.16%	483	1.70%	117	0.41%	-1,260	-4.45%	28,342
Wood	7,968	57.76%	5,585	40.49%	163	1.18%	79	0.57%	2,383	17.27%	13,795
Total	590,114	52.48%	470,805	41.87%	56,965	5.07%	6,618	0.59%	119,309	10.61%	1,124,502

==== Counties that flipped from Republican to Democratic ====
- Adams
- Ashland
- Barron
- Bayfield
- Brown
- Buffalo
- Burnett
- Calumet
- Chippewa
- Clark
- Columbia
- Crawford
- Dane
- Dodge
- Fond du Lac
- Forest
- Grant
- Green
- Green Lake
- Iowa
- Iron
- Jackson
- Jefferson
- Juneau
- Kenosha
- Kewaunee
- Lafayette
- Langlade
- Lincoln
- Manitowoc
- Marathon
- Marquette
- Milwaukee
- Monroe
- Oconto
- Oneida
- Outagamie
- Ozaukee
- Pepin
- Polk
- Portage
- Price
- Racine
- Rusk
- Sauk
- Sawyer
- Shawano
- St. Croix
- Taylor
- Trempealeau
- Vernon
- Washburn
- Washington
- Waupaca
- Wood

==== Counties that flipped from Democratic to Republican ====
- Sheboygan

== Bibliography ==
- Gubernatorial Elections, 1787-1997. Washington, D.C.: Congressional Quarterly Inc. 1998. ISBN 1-56802-396-0.
- Witte, Edwin E.; Kelly, Alice, eds. (1933). The Wisconsin Blue Book, 1933. Madison, Wisconsin: Democrat Printing Company, State Printer.
