= 1934 Wisconsin gubernatorial election =

- November 6, 1934
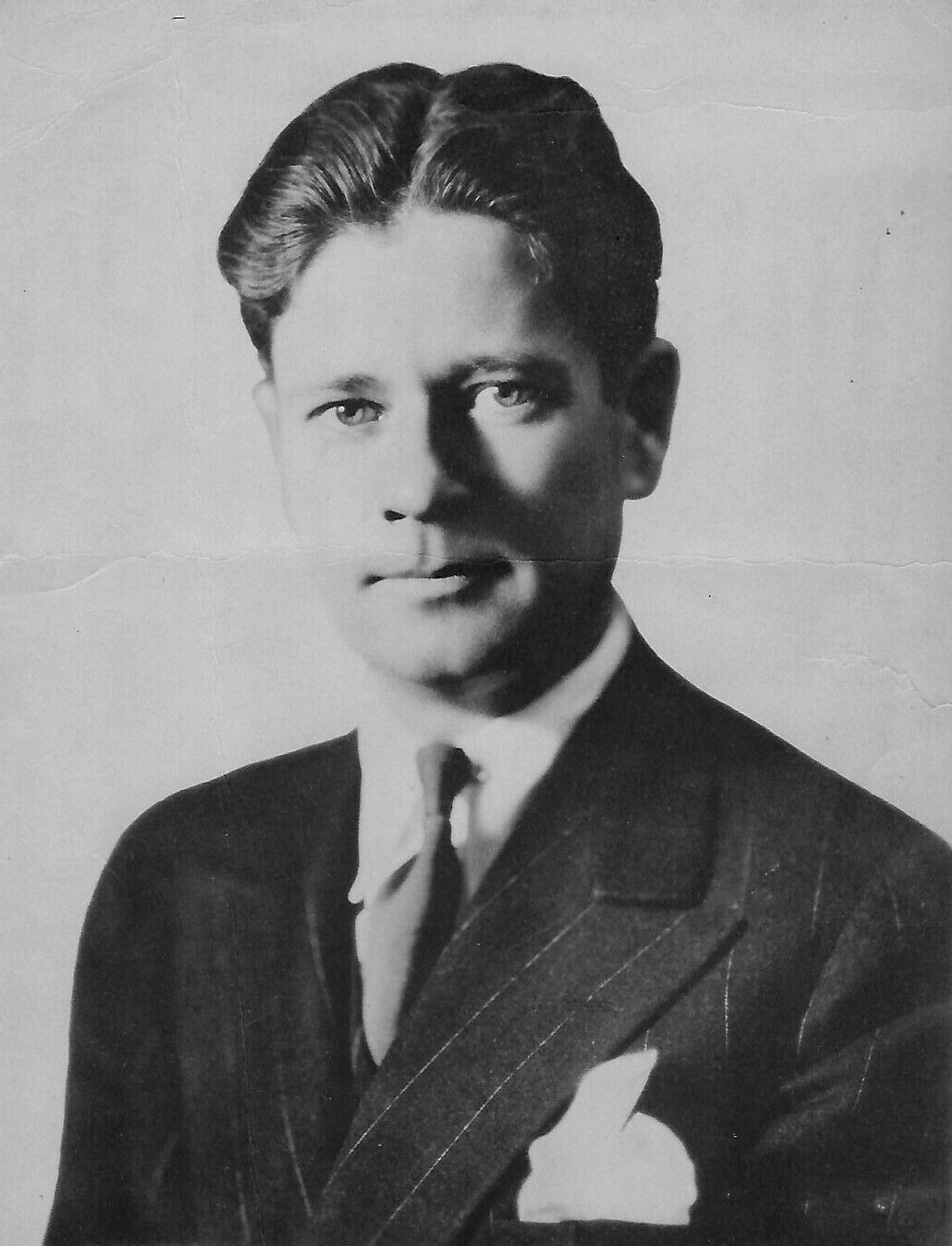

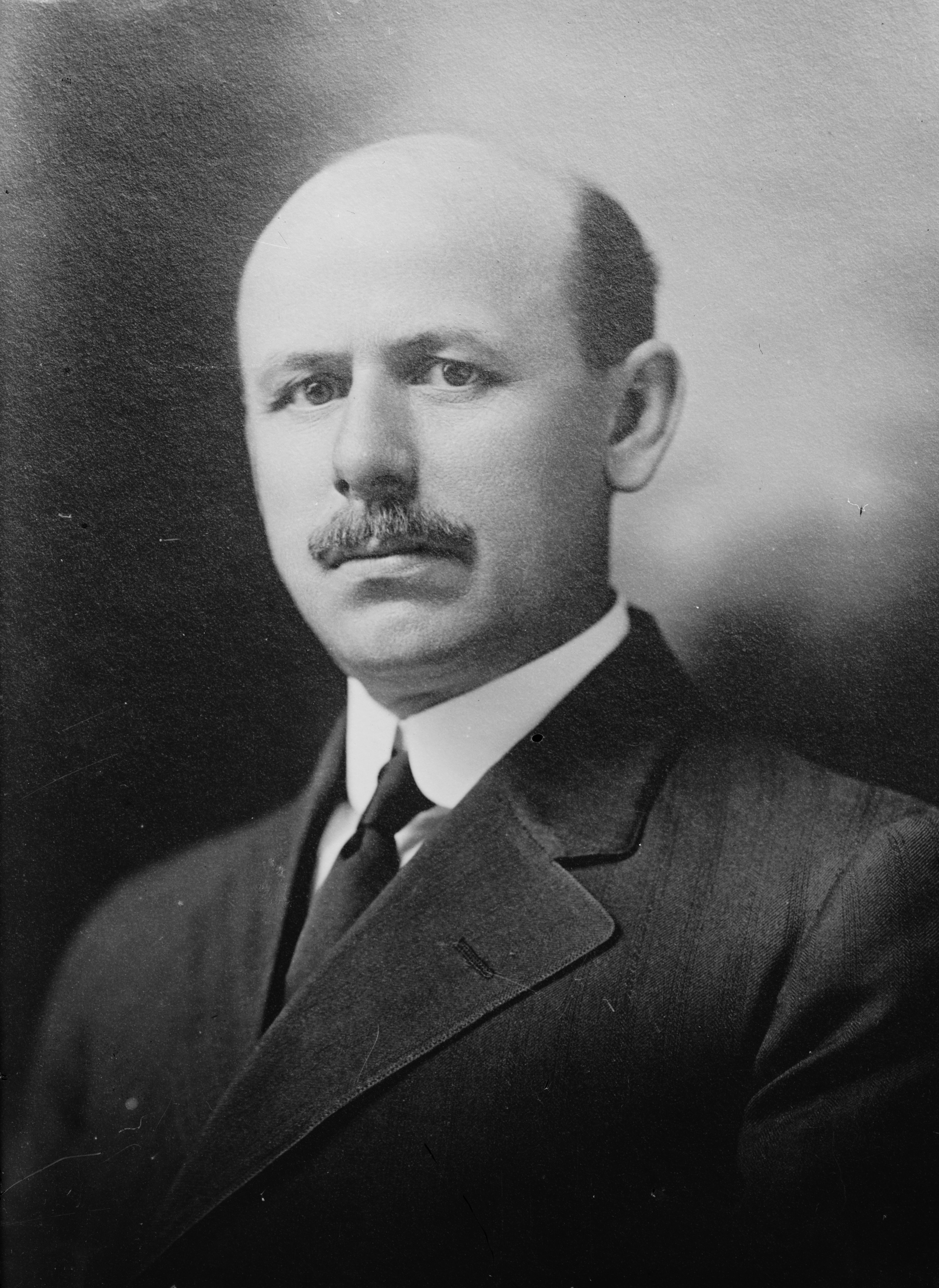

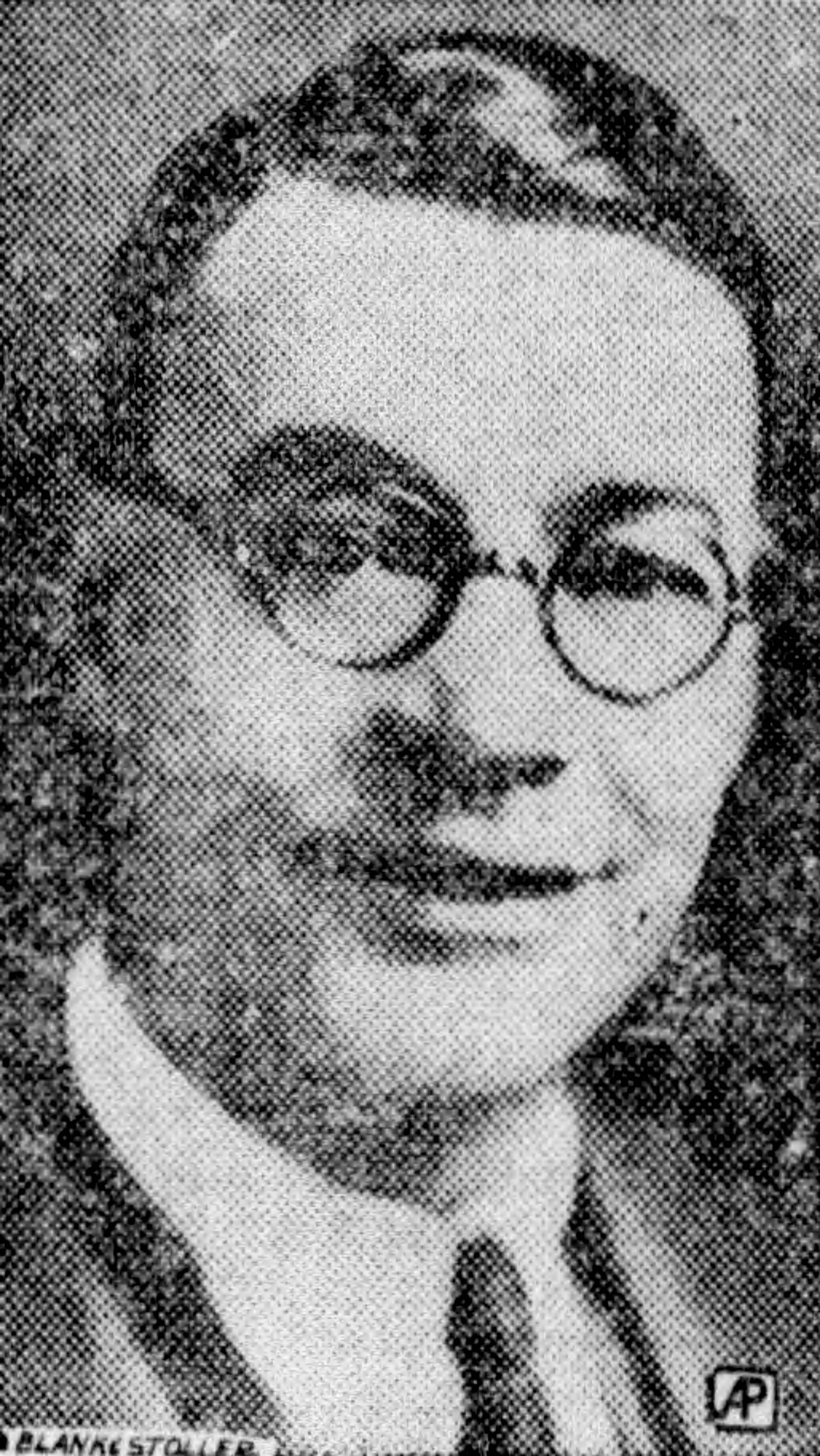
Nominee	Philip La Follette	Albert G. Schmedeman	Howard T. Greene
Party	Progressive	Democratic	Republican
Popular vote	373,093	359,467	172,980
Percentage	39.12%	37.69%	18.14%
- County results La Follette: 30–40% 40–50% 50–60% 60–70% Schmedeman: 30–40% 40–50% 50–60% Greene: 30–40% 40–50%
Governor before election
Albert G. Schmedeman
Democratic
Elected Governor
Philip La Follette
Progressive

The 1934 Wisconsin gubernatorial election was held on November 6, 1934. Primary elections were held on September 18, 1934. Incumbent Democratic Governor Albert G. Schmedeman was defeated by Progressive nominee Philip La Follette.

As of 2022, this is the last time Green Lake County has voted for the Democratic nominee for governor. This is also the only gubernatorial election in which Waushara County did not vote for the Republican candidate. (Note: Waushara County did vote for the Whig candidate in 1851 and the opposition (non-Democratic) candidate in 1853; both elections took place prior to the establishment of the Republican Party in 1854. Waushara County has never voted for a Democrat in a gubernatorial election, although it has done so four times in presidential elections.)

== Background ==
With the onset of the Great Depression, Wisconsin's Republican factionalism had reached a breaking point, as Stalwarts and Progressives had grown increasingly estranged due to a growingly divergent outlook on the world. In 1928 the stalwarts had won the primary and nominated wealthy business leader Walter Kohler over Joseph Beck, defeating Madison mayor Albert Schmedemann. Two years later progressive scion Philip La Follette became governor, once again reasserting control of the party on the part of progressives. Despite taking several actions to curb the economic crisis, La Follette was unable to effectively articulate the achievements of his administration to primary voters, and with the factor of being outspent by the wealthy Kohler, went down in defeat in the primary, as Stalwarts once again retook control of the party. This time, in 1932, the Republicans went down in defeat against Schmedemann, who was propelled to victory by the election of New York governor Franklin Delano Roosevelt.

With this defeat, La Follette returned to his private life, but various factions within and beyond the Republican party began stirring for the formation of a new third party. This third party eventually culminated in the founding of the Wisconsin Progressive Party in 1934. After successfully suing the Secretary of State, La Follette and his supporters were able to hold a third party primary, and run under that label in the general election. Despite this, La Follette held reservations about running on the same ticket as his brother, Robert La Follette Jr., as he feared voters would reject "too much La Follette." In spite of this concern, he eventually threw his hat into the ring with tacit support from the Roosevelt administration.

== Democratic party ==
=== Candidates ===
==== Nominee ====
- Albert G. Schmedeman, incumbent Governor

==== Eliminated in primary ====
- Richard F. Lehmann
- William B. Rubin, attorney and unsuccessful candidate for Democratic nomination for governor in 1932

=== Results ===
Democratic primary results
Party	Candidate	Votes	%
Democratic	Albert G. Schmedeman (inc.)	166,001	74.72%
Democratic	William B. Rubin	41,985	18.90%
Democratic	Richard F. Lehmann	14,189	6.39%
Total votes		222,175	100.00%

== Republican party ==
=== Candidates ===
==== Nominee ====
- Howard T. Greene, dairy farmer

==== Eliminated in primary ====
- James N. Tittemore, U.S. Marshal and unsuccessful candidate for Republican nomination for governor in 1918 and 1920 and Independent candidate for U.S. Senate in 1926
- Fred R. Zimmerman, former Governor (1927–1929)

=== Results ===
Republican primary results
Party	Candidate	Votes	%
Republican	Howard T. Greene	84,020	56.45%
Republican	Fred R. Zimmerman	53,734	36.10%
Republican	James N. Tittemore	11,084	7.45%
Total votes		148,838	100.00%

== Progressive party ==
=== Candidates ===
==== Nominee ====
- Philip La Follette, former Governor (1931–1933)

==== Eliminated in primary ====
- Henry O. Meisel, policeman

==== Declined ====
- Thomas Ryum Amlie, former congressman (1931–1933) (ran for congress)
- Harold Groves, state representative (Republican, ran for state senate as a progressive)

=== Results ===
Progressive primary results
Party	Candidate	Votes	%
Progressive	Philip La Follette	154,454	95.36%
Progressive	Henry O. Meisel	7,520	4.64%
Total votes		161,974	100.00%

== Social-Democratic party ==
=== Candidates ===
- George A. Nelson, farmer and former Speaker of the Wisconsin State Assembly (1926–1927)

=== Results ===
Social-Democratic primary results
Party	Candidate	Votes	%
Social-Democratic	George A. Nelson	28,877	100.00%
Total votes		28,877	100.00%

== Other party nominations ==
- Morris Childs, Independent Communist, Communist Party district organizer
- Joseph Ehrhardt, Independent Socialist Labor, Socialist Labor nominee for governor in 1928 and 1932
- Thomas W. North, Independent Prohibition, Prohibition nominee for Wisconsin's 1st congressional district in 1902

The Communist, Prohibition and Socialist Labor parties were forced to run candidates as independents, as they were not recognized as legal parties due to failing to poll the required number of votes in past primary elections.

== General election ==
=== Results ===
1934 Wisconsin gubernatorial election
Party	Candidate	Votes	%	±%
Progressive	Philip La Follette	373,093	39.12%	
Democratic	Albert G. Schmedeman (incumbent)	359,467	37.69%	−14.79%
Republican	Howard T. Greene	172,980	18.14%	−23.73%
Social-Democratic	George A. Nelson	44,589	4.68%	−0.39%
Communist (Note: "Independent Communist")	Morris Childs	2,454	0.26%	−0.02%
Prohibition (Note: "Independent Prohibition")	Thomas W. North	857	0.09%	−0.19%
Socialist Labor (Note: "Independent Socialist Labor")	Joseph Ehrhardt	332	0.03%	+0.00%
	Scattering (Note: These are not listed in the Blue Book but are listed in the Board of Canvassers report.)	25	0.00%	
Majority		13,626	1.43%	
Turnout		953,797	100.00%	
Progressive gain from Democratic		Swing		

=== Results by county ===
This was the only election between 1892 and 1966 in which Marinette County voted for the Democratic candidate. After this election, Marquette County would not vote Democratic again until 2002 and Fond du Lac County and Winnebago County would not do the same until 1982.

County	Philip La Follette Progressive		Albert G. Schmedeman Democratic		Howard T. Greene Republican		George A. Nelson Social-Democratic		All Others Various		Margin (Note: All margins are La Follette over Schmedeman unless otherwise noted)		Total votes cast
County	#	%	#	%	#	%	#	%	#	%	#	%	Total votes cast
Adams	1,469	50.03%	924	31.47%	513	17.47%	28	0.95%	2	0.07%	545	18.56%	2,936
Ashland	3,906	50.70%	2,425	31.48%	1,077	13.98%	217	2.82%	79	1.03%	1,481	19.22%	7,704
Barron	5,517	53.18%	2,364	22.79%	1,755	16.92%	676	6.52%	63	0.61%	3,153	30.39%	10,375
Bayfield	3,213	56.22%	1,217	21.29%	998	17.46%	175	3.06%	112	1.96%	1,996	34.93%	5,715
Brown	8,144	37.12%	11,004	50.15%	2,336	10.65%	447	2.04%	10	0.05%	-2,860	-13.03%	21,941
Buffalo	2,592	55.65%	1,035	22.22%	918	19.71%	111	2.38%	2	0.04%	1,557	33.43%	4,658
Burnett	1,938	50.10%	1,147	29.65%	623	16.11%	133	3.44%	27	0.70%	791	20.45%	3,868
Calumet	2,204	39.57%	2,853	51.22%	475	8.53%	35	0.63%	3	0.05%	-649	-11.65%	5,570
Chippewa	3,922	37.89%	3,443	33.27%	2,797	27.02%	171	1.65%	17	0.16%	479	4.63%	10,350
Clark	5,816	53.69%	3,270	30.19%	1,445	13.34%	207	1.91%	94	0.87%	2,546	23.50%	10,832
Columbia	5,354	40.65%	4,199	31.88%	3,553	26.98%	60	0.46%	5	0.04%	1,155	8.77%	13,171
Crawford	2,185	35.18%	2,354	37.90%	1,657	26.68%	14	0.23%	1	0.02%	-169	-2.72%	6,211
Dane	21,469	51.00%	10,188	24.20%	9,837	23.37%	491	1.17%	114	0.27%	11,281	26.80%	42,099
Dodge	7,378	41.28%	7,517	42.06%	2,599	14.54%	363	2.03%	14	0.08%	-139	-0.78%	17,871
Door	2,807	44.92%	2,431	38.90%	978	15.65%	26	0.42%	7	0.11%	376	6.02%	6,249
Douglas	9,045	47.91%	6,254	33.12%	3,278	17.36%	162	0.86%	142	0.75%	2,791	14.78%	18,881
Dunn	3,797	43.41%	2,165	24.75%	2,383	27.25%	376	4.30%	25	0.29%	1,414 (Note: La Follette's margin over Greene)	16.17%	8,746
Eau Claire	4,957	38.45%	4,379	33.97%	3,381	26.23%	169	1.31%	5	0.04%	578	4.48%	12,891
Florence	645	38.17%	528	31.24%	417	24.67%	93	5.50%	7	0.41%	117	6.92%	1,690
Fond du Lac	7,315	36.22%	8,980	44.46%	3,734	18.49%	122	0.60%	47	0.23%	-1,665	-8.24%	20,198
Forest	1,828	49.35%	1,411	38.09%	417	11.26%	36	0.97%	12	0.32%	417	11.26%	3,704
Grant	5,040	37.83%	3,734	28.03%	4,490	33.70%	35	0.26%	24	0.18%	550	4.13%	13,323
Green	3,634	46.22%	1,730	22.00%	2,445	31.10%	27	0.34%	26	0.33%	1,189	15.12%	7,862
Green Lake	1,259	22.71%	2,924	52.73%	1,334	24.06%	23	0.41%	5	0.09%	-1,665	-30.03%	5,545
Iowa	3,515	46.80%	1,793	23.87%	2,148	28.60%	15	0.20%	39	0.52%	1,367	18.20%	7,510
Iron	1,957	49.46%	1,491	37.68%	354	8.95%	14	0.35%	141	3.56%	466	11.78%	3,957
Jackson	3,361	61.10%	1,423	25.87%	625	11.36%	85	1.55%	7	0.13%	1,938	35.23%	5,501
Jefferson	5,590	41.52%	5,416	40.23%	2,378	17.66%	53	0.39%	25	0.19%	174	1.29%	13,462
Juneau	3,358	48.58%	2,353	34.04%	1,155	16.71%	39	0.56%	8	0.12%	1,005	14.54%	6,913
Kenosha	8,562	39.30%	7,961	36.55%	4,093	18.79%	1,042	4.78%	126	0.58%	601	2.76%	21,784
Kewaunee	2,356	40.91%	2,689	46.69%	665	11.55%	45	0.78%	4	0.07%	-333	-5.78%	5,759
La Crosse	7,732	42.77%	5,855	32.38%	4,445	24.59%	34	0.19%	14	0.08%	1,877	10.38%	18,080
Lafayette	2,968	39.45%	2,304	30.63%	2,232	29.67%	12	0.16%	7	0.09%	664	8.83%	7,523
Langlade	2,445	31.86%	3,824	49.83%	1,288	16.78%	74	0.96%	43	0.56%	-1,379	-17.97%	7,674
Lincoln	3,480	44.10%	2,434	30.84%	1,645	20.84%	317	4.02%	16	0.20%	1,046	13.25%	7,892
Manitowoc	9,088	48.58%	7,629	40.78%	1,818	9.72%	161	0.86%	11	0.06%	1,459	7.80%	18,707
Marathon	8,917	45.21%	7,146	36.23%	3,006	15.24%	640	3.25%	13	0.07%	1,771	8.98%	19,722
Marinette	3,261	31.80%	4,800	46.80%	1,952	19.03%	231	2.25%	12	0.12%	-1,539	-15.01%	10,256
Marquette	1,140	31.65%	1,273	35.34%	1,169	32.45%	15	0.42%	5	0.14%	-104 (Note: Schmedeman's margin over Greene)	-2.89%	3,602
Milwaukee	55,300	28.74%	87,943	45.70%	18,975	9.86%	29,012	15.08%	1,215	0.63%	-32,643	-16.96%	192,445
Monroe	5,065	52.16%	2,567	26.44%	1,929	19.87%	130	1.34%	19	0.20%	2,498	25.73%	9,710
Oconto	3,946	43.10%	3,230	35.28%	1,554	16.97%	416	4.54%	9	0.10%	716	7.82%	9,155
Oneida	3,184	49.43%	2,140	33.22%	708	10.99%	401	6.22%	9	0.14%	1,044	16.21%	6,442
Outagamie	8,184	38.68%	9,085	42.94%	3,643	17.22%	238	1.12%	9	0.04%	-901	-4.26%	21,159
Ozaukee	2,674	42.99%	2,959	47.57%	482	7.75%	103	1.66%	2	0.03%	-285	-4.58%	6,220
Pepin	1,104	37.78%	1,041	35.63%	725	24.81%	37	1.27%	15	0.51%	63	2.16%	2,922
Pierce	3,383	46.71%	1,742	24.05%	1,916	26.45%	184	2.54%	18	0.25%	1,467	20.25%	7,243
Polk	4,183	47.08%	1,649	18.56%	1,191	13.40%	1,837	20.68%	25	0.28%	2,346 (Note: La Follette's margin over Nelson)	26.40%	8,885
Portage	3,145	26.68%	6,613	56.09%	1,923	16.31%	102	0.87%	7	0.06%	-3,468	-29.41%	11,790
Price	3,192	50.18%	1,963	30.86%	986	15.50%	155	2.44%	65	1.02%	1,229	19.32%	6,361
Racine	9,023	32.08%	13,293	47.26%	4,934	17.54%	676	2.40%	204	0.73%	-4,270	-15.18%	28,130
Richland	1,876	27.04%	1,787	25.75%	3,170	45.68%	80	1.15%	26	0.37%	-1,294 (Note: Greene's margin over La Follette)	-18.65%	6,939
Rock	6,838	28.52%	9,167	38.24%	7,846	32.73%	87	0.36%	37	0.15%	-1,321	-5.51%	23,975
Rusk	2,210	42.03%	1,780	33.85%	929	17.67%	318	6.05%	21	0.40%	430	8.18%	5,258
Sauk	5,950	45.91%	3,420	26.39%	3,316	25.59%	178	1.37%	96	0.74%	2,530	19.52%	12,960
Sawyer	1,377	36.54%	1,639	43.50%	708	18.79%	32	0.85%	12	0.32%	-262	-6.95%	3,768
Shawano	5,159	54.00%	2,622	27.45%	1,409	14.75%	355	3.72%	8	0.08%	2,537	26.56%	9,553
Sheboygan	7,159	32.17%	10,217	45.91%	3,966	17.82%	876	3.94%	35	0.16%	-3,058	-13.74%	22,253
St. Croix	4,010	42.04%	3,236	33.92%	2,042	21.41%	237	2.48%	14	0.15%	774	8.11%	9,539
Taylor	2,638	46.08%	1,682	29.38%	607	10.60%	719	12.56%	79	1.38%	956	16.70%	5,725
Trempealeau	4,478	53.42%	2,549	30.41%	1,291	15.40%	50	0.60%	14	0.17%	1,929	23.01%	8,382
Vernon	4,473	51.20%	1,800	20.60%	2,412	27.61%	37	0.42%	15	0.17%	2,061	23.59%	8,737
Vilas	1,488	39.62%	1,634	43.50%	546	14.54%	36	0.96%	52	1.38%	-146	-3.89%	3,756
Walworth	3,089	26.28%	4,020	34.20%	4,593	39.08%	34	0.29%	18	0.15%	-573 (Note: Greene's margin over Schmedeman)	-4.88%	11,754
Washburn	2,507	62.19%	757	18.78%	723	17.94%	33	0.82%	11	0.27%	1,750	43.41%	4,031
Washington	4,940	46.94%	3,997	37.98%	1,465	13.92%	120	1.14%	3	0.03%	943	8.96%	10,525
Waukesha	6,692	32.68%	9,009	43.99%	4,387	21.42%	363	1.77%	27	0.13%	-2,317	-11.31%	20,478
Waupaca	6,001	48.63%	3,201	25.94%	2,982	24.17%	147	1.19%	8	0.06%	2,800	22.69%	12,339
Waushara	2,523	39.97%	1,971	31.22%	1,694	26.83%	103	1.63%	22	0.35%	552	8.74%	6,313
Winnebago	8,569	35.54%	9,148	37.94%	5,817	24.12%	341	1.41%	237	0.98%	-579	-2.40%	24,112
Wood	5,569	45.63%	4,739	38.83%	1,698	13.91%	178	1.46%	22	0.18%	830	6.80%	12,206
Total	373,093	39.12%	359,467	37.69%	172,980	18.14%	44,589	4.67%	3,668	0.38%	13,626	1.43%	953,797

==== Counties that flipped from Democratic to Progressive ====
- Adams
- Ashland
- Barron
- Bayfield
- Buffalo
- Burnett
- Chippewa
- Clark
- Columbia
- Dane
- Forest
- Grant
- Green
- Iowa
- Iron
- Jackson
- Jefferson
- Juneau
- Kenosha
- Lafayette
- Lincoln
- Manitowoc
- Marathon
- Monroe
- Oconto
- Oneida
- Pepin
- Polk
- Price
- Rusk
- Sauk
- Shawano
- St. Croix
- Taylor
- Trempealeau
- Vernon
- Washburn
- Washington
- Waupaca
- Wood

==== Counties that flipped from Republican to Progressive ====
- Door
- Douglas
- Dunn
- Eau Claire
- Florence
- La Crosse
- Pierce
- Waushara

==== Counties that flipped from Republican to Democratic ====
- Marinette
- Rock
- Sheboygan
- Vilas
- Waukesha
- Winnebago

== Bibliography ==
- Gubernatorial Elections, 1787-1997. Washington, D.C.: Congressional Quarterly Inc. 1998. ISBN 1-56802-396-0.
- Ohm, Howard F.; Bryhan, Leone G., eds. (1935). The Wisconsin Blue Book, 1935. Madison, Wisconsin: Democrat Printing Company, State Printer.
