= Governor Kohler =

Governor Kohler may refer to:

- Walter J. Kohler Jr. (1904–1976), 33rd Governor of Wisconsin
- Walter J. Kohler Sr. (1875–1940), 26th Governor of Wisconsin
