= Philip La Follette =

20th-century American lawyer, politician, and 27th and 29th Governor of Wisconsin

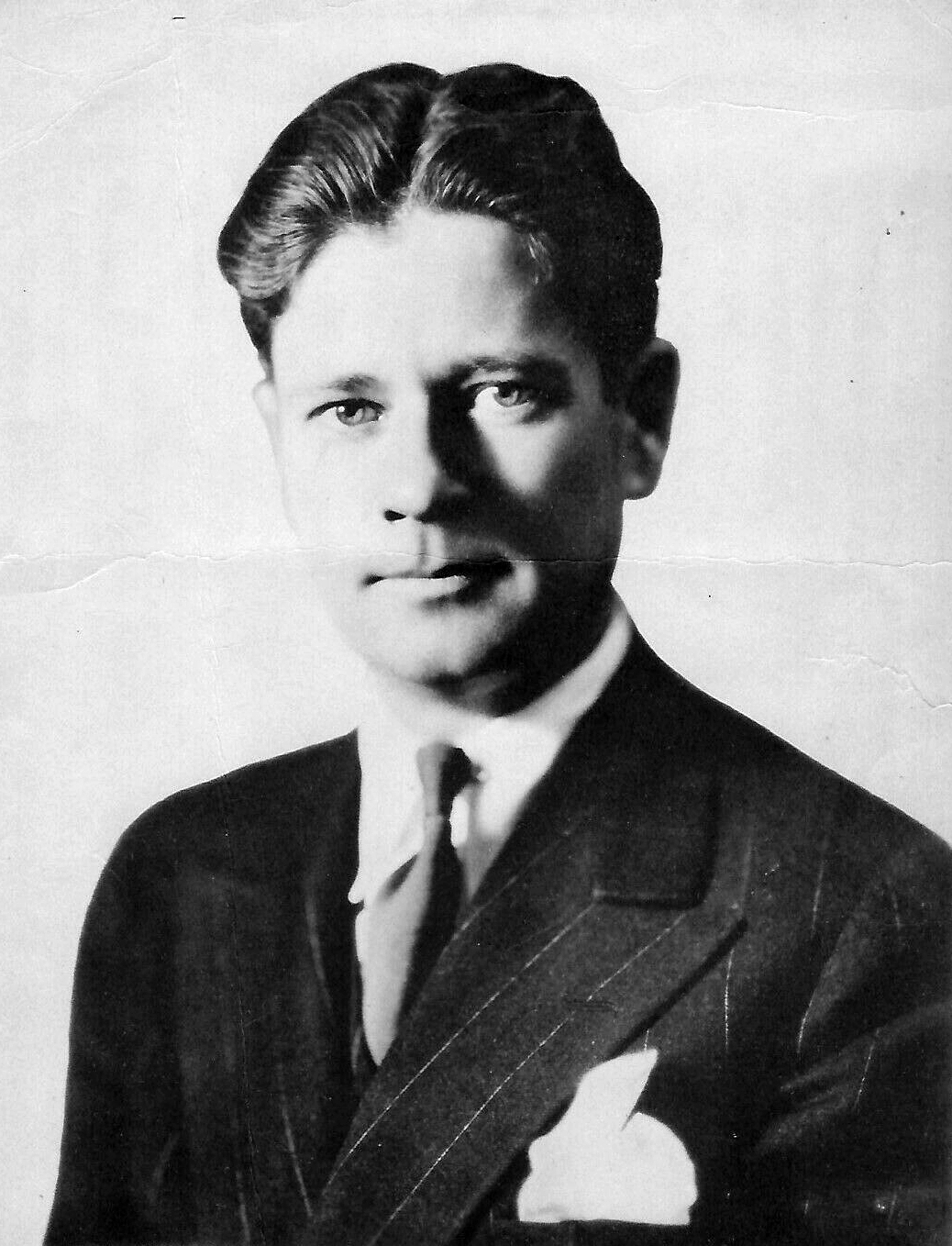
- La Follette in 1935

27th & 29th Governor of Wisconsin
- In office January 7, 1935 – January 2, 1939
- Lieutenant: Thomas J. O'Malley; Henry Gunderson; Herman Ekern
- Preceded by: Albert G. Schmedeman
- Succeeded by: Julius P. Heil
- In office January 5, 1931 – January 2, 1933
- Lieutenant: Henry A. Huber
- Preceded by: Walter J. Kohler Sr.
- Succeeded by: Albert G. Schmedeman

District Attorney of Dane County
- In office January 1, 1925 – January 1, 1927
- Preceded by: Theodore G. Lewis
- Succeeded by: Glenn D. Roberts

Personal details
- Born: Philip Fox La Follette; May 8, 1897 Madison, Wisconsin, U.S.
- Died: August 18, 1965 (aged 68) Madison, Wisconsin, U.S.
- Resting place: Forest Hill Cemetery; Madison, Wisconsin
- Party: Republican (before 1934, after 1946); Wisconsin Progressive (1934–1946); National Progressives (1938–1946)
- Other political affiliations: America First Committee
- Spouses: Isabel Bacon; (m. 1923–1963; died 1973)
- Children: 3
- Parents: Robert M. La Follette, Sr. (father); Belle Case La Follette (mother)
- Relatives: Robert M. La Follette Jr. (brother); Fola La Follette (sister); Bronson La Follette (nephew); La Follette family
- Education: University of Wisconsin, Madison (BA, LLB)
- Profession: Lawyer

Military service
- Allegiance: United States
- Branch/service: United States Army
- Years of service: 1918, 1942–1945
- Rank: Lieutenant Colonel
- Unit: South West Pacific Command
- Battles/wars: World War I; World War II

Philip Fox La Follette (May 8, 1897 – August 18, 1965) was an American lawyer and politician who served as the 27th and 29th governor of Wisconsin, from 1931 to 1933 and from 1935 to 1939. A member of the prominent La Follette family, he was a son of Wisconsin governor and U.S. senator Robert M. "Fighting Bob" La Follette and younger brother of U.S. senator Robert M. La Follette Jr.

After first winning election as a leader of the progressive wing of the Republican Party, La Follette left the party after losing the 1932 Republican gubernatorial primary; he returned to office running on the Wisconsin Progressive Party ticket after founding that party with his brother in 1934. After which he began to be increasingly accused of authoritarianism, fascism and demagoguery. In 1938, he briefly attempted to form a national progressive party (the National Progressives of America), but the effort was largely abandoned after he enlisted in the Pacific War.

During World War II, La Follette was commissioned in the U.S. Army and served as public relations officer for General Douglas MacArthur. Later in life, he was general counsel and president of Hazeltine Corporation.

== Early life and career ==
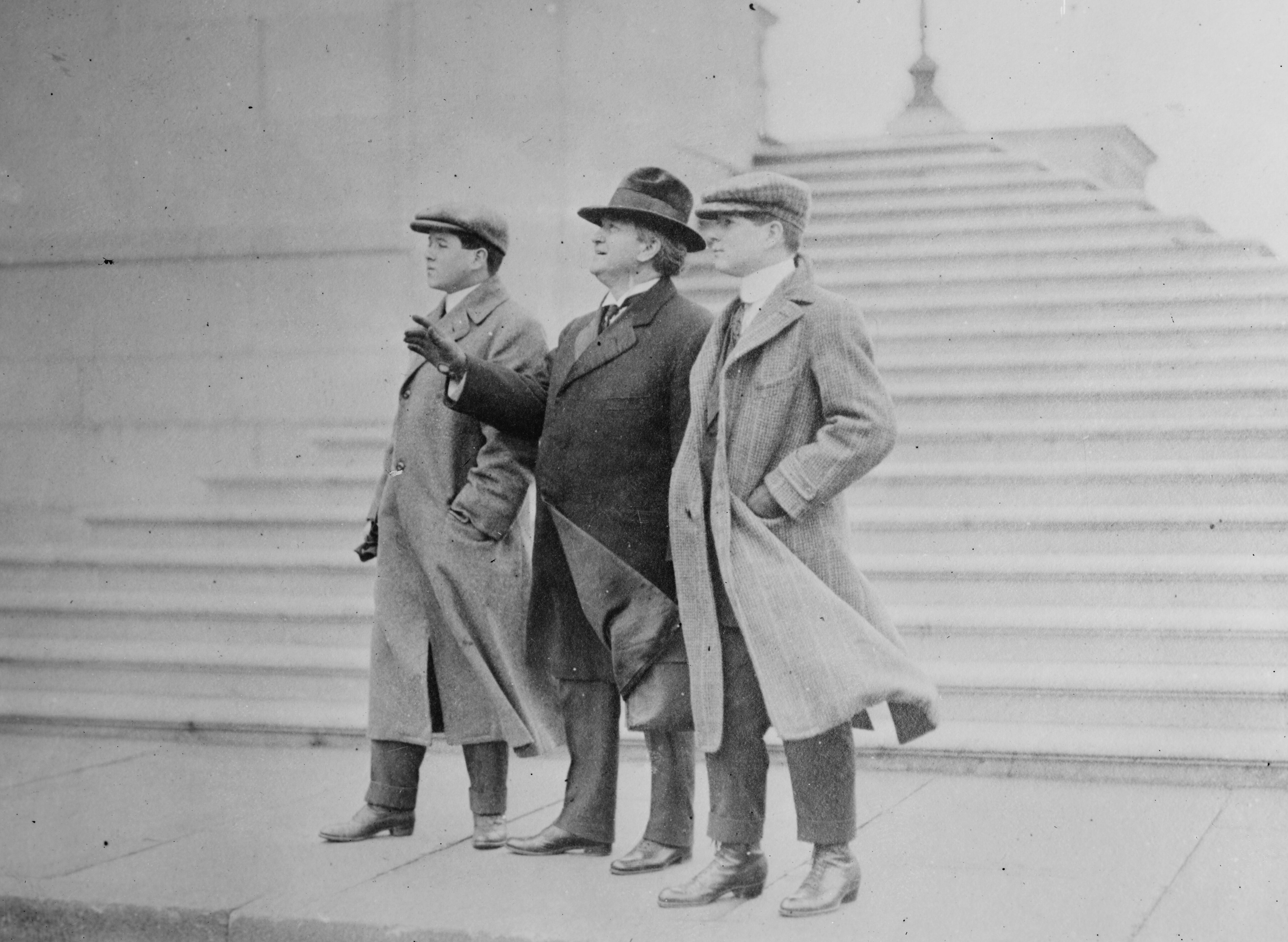
La Follette (right) with his brother Robert (left) and their father, Senator Robert M. La Follette, c. 1910s

La Follette was born on May 8, 1897 in Madison, Wisconsin, to former representative Robert M. La Follette and women's suffrage activist Belle Case La Follette. At the time of his birth, he had been the third of four children. La Follette served as a second lieutenant in the United States Army Infantry in 1918, during World War I. In 1919, he received a Bachelor of Arts degree from University of Wisconsin–Madison and in 1922, he received a Bachelor of Laws degree.

La Follette served on his father's presidential campaign in 1924. He was the district attorney for Dane County, Wisconsin, from 1925 to 1927.

== First Wisconsin governorship (1931–1933) ==
La Follette entered the gubernatorial election in 1930 against incumbent governor Walter J. Kohler Sr.. During the campaign La Follette and his allies criticized the governor for conservative policies and tied him to the unpopular administration of Herbert Hoover. During his first term, La Follette began implementing policies to alleviate the Great Depression. Many of the policies enacted under him would later serve as models for the federal government under Franklin D. Roosevelt.

During his first term, La Follette enacted state ownership of public utilities, conservation and employment programs to help the unemployed. Additionally, La Follette helped set up a program for unemployment insurance, the first of its kind in the country, and a single state-wide labor code. La Follette was defeated in the Republican primary because of the worsening conditions of the Great Depression, as well as broader dissatisfaction with his service as governor. He was defeated for re-nomination by former governor Kohler.

== Out of government ==
By 1934, the Great Depression had caused a sharp decline of conditions in Wisconsin, and this decline, alongside a resurgence of the Wisconsin Democratic Party, forced progressive Republicans to seek new ways into office.

While La Follette eventually supported a split from the Republicans, he worked alongside William T. Evjue, the editor of the Madison-based Capital Times to curb the more radical influences of congressman Thomas Amlie and his allies.

Separately from La Follette and his allies, more radical elements of the third party movement established the Farmer-Labor-Progressive League (FLPL), which would develop a platform and endorse candidates in elections, this new organization had the potential to upset the aims La Follette had been working for with the new party. Fortunately, after La Follette spoke at the F.L.P.L. convention, the League decided to support his party.

== Second Wisconsin governorship (1935–1939) ==
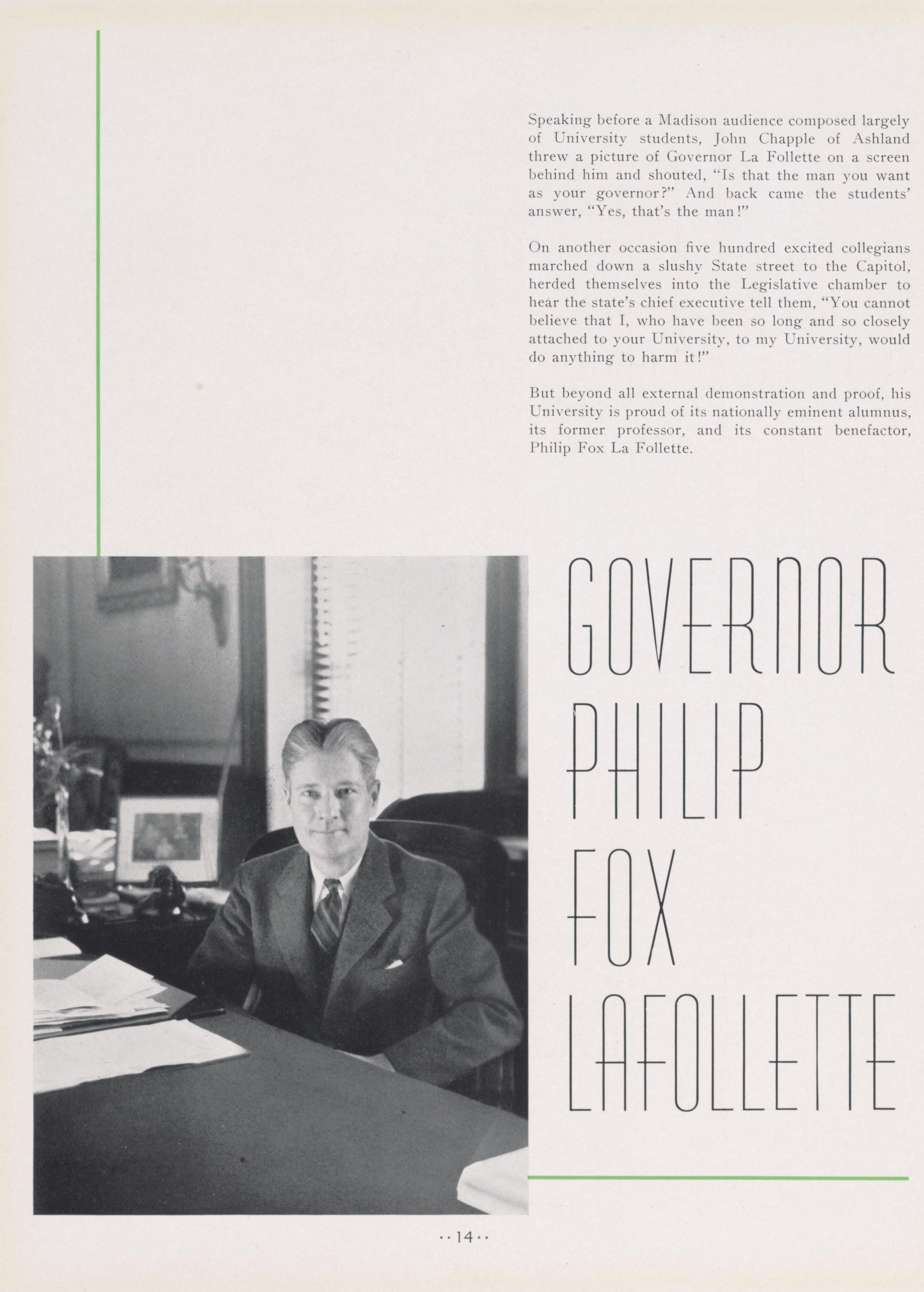
La Follette in the University of Wisconsin–Madison yearbook, 1938

Following his re-election, La Follette took a far different tone for his second term than he had for his first. In his second inaugural address he stressed the need for reform in more concrete terms, advocating for an increase in executive power and calling for increased spending towards schools and wages despite a projected $9 million dollar shortfall in the budget.

=== Wisconsin Works Bill ===
One of La Follette's most radical pieces of legislation up to that point was the Wisconsin Works Bill, which would have established a state controlled public works and relief program. The program had the backing of Roosevelt, who was supportive of state efforts at experimentation.

In planning out the Bill, La Follette asked the Wisconsin Regional Planning Committee to expand its inventory of public works projects. Additionally, La Follette employed his secretary, Thomas Duncan and state adjudant general Ralph Immell to develop a plan to finance and assemble administrative details for the program respectively. Alongside the other two, Ralph Hoyt, a Milwaukee lawyer, was charged with developing methods to circumvent financial limitations in the state constitution. The plan additionally was ironed out over a week in early May with several of Roosevelt's directors and advisors, such as Harry Hopkins, Frank Walker, Harold Ickes, and Rexford Tugwell.

When the legislation was finally submitted to the legislature, Democrats turned against the governor, accusing La Follette of using the bill as a means of gaining more control over work relief in the state. To try and push the legislature to support his bill, La Follette began a campaign, using the bully pulpit to appeal to the constituents of opposed senators.

Within the legislation, it provided for the creation of a Wisconsin Finance Authority, which was intended to bypass financial restrictions within the state constitution. The directors of the Authority would be appointed by the governor directly. Additionally, the Authority would be able to issue up to 100 million dollars' worth of its own notes, which would be exchangeable with U.S. dollars and act as valid means to pay state and local taxes. Additionally, the bill contained provisions for old age pensions, public school subsidies, and an amendment to balance the state budget. La Follette would contend that the plan would eventually pay for itself.

The plan immediately faced backlash from conservatives, socialists, municipal governments, and bankers. Critics argued the plan was too vague in its financing provisions, its constitutionality, and that it concentrated too much power in the hands of the governor. Despite this, the Roosevelt administration expressed support for the passage of the legislation. In the end, the bill was defeated in the state senate by a vote of 9 for, and 14 against. Even after several amendments, the bill was again defeated in the state senate, this time by a vote of 16 for and 17 against.

Following the defeat of the Works Bill, La Follette recommended Immell be appointed as Wisconsin director of the Works Progress Administration. Throughout the course of Roosevelt's presidency, he would continue criticizing his relief efforts as insufficient compared to the failed Works Bill.

During the 1936 election, La Follette made the failure of the Works Bill a central part of his campaign and, thanks in part to the national Democratic wave that year, won enough seats that he could then pass a "Little New Deal" in the 1937 session.

=== Wisconsin Reorganization Orders ===
Following his re-election in 1936, La Follette began creating plans to radically alter the structure of government in the state. To this end he drafted the Wisconsin Reorganization Orders, which would "transfer certain divisions, agencies, functions, powers, and duties to the Executive," and allow the governor to propose bills that the legislature could either ratify or reject such bills.

Following a drawn out three-week legislative session, La Follette began attempting alternative means to get the legislature to act on his proposals, despite opposition from Democrats and Republicans, both houses of the legislature passed changes to the governing rules to speed up the passage of legislation. In coordination with Assembly Speaker Paul Alfonsi, and progressive members of the state Senate, they began quickly forcing legislation through the chamber using the new rules, passing a farm bill, a commerce bill, and a bill for mortgage moratoriums all in quick succession.

During the session, bills were introduced and passed with restrictions on parliamentary debate and without hearings from the public. Additionally, the presiding officers of both chambers would repeatedly rule standard parliamentary procedure as out of order. With the final hours of the session spent confirming 24 of La Follette's administrative appointments. The session immediately drew controversy as members of both major parties left the chamber shouting "heil" in a mock Nazi salute. while comparisons were made in the media to the dictatorial actions of the deceased Governor of Louisiana Huey Long.

The special session caused a rift within the Wisconsin Progressive Party as members like Evjue sharply criticized La Follette and his conduct in the special session.

=== National Progressives of America ===
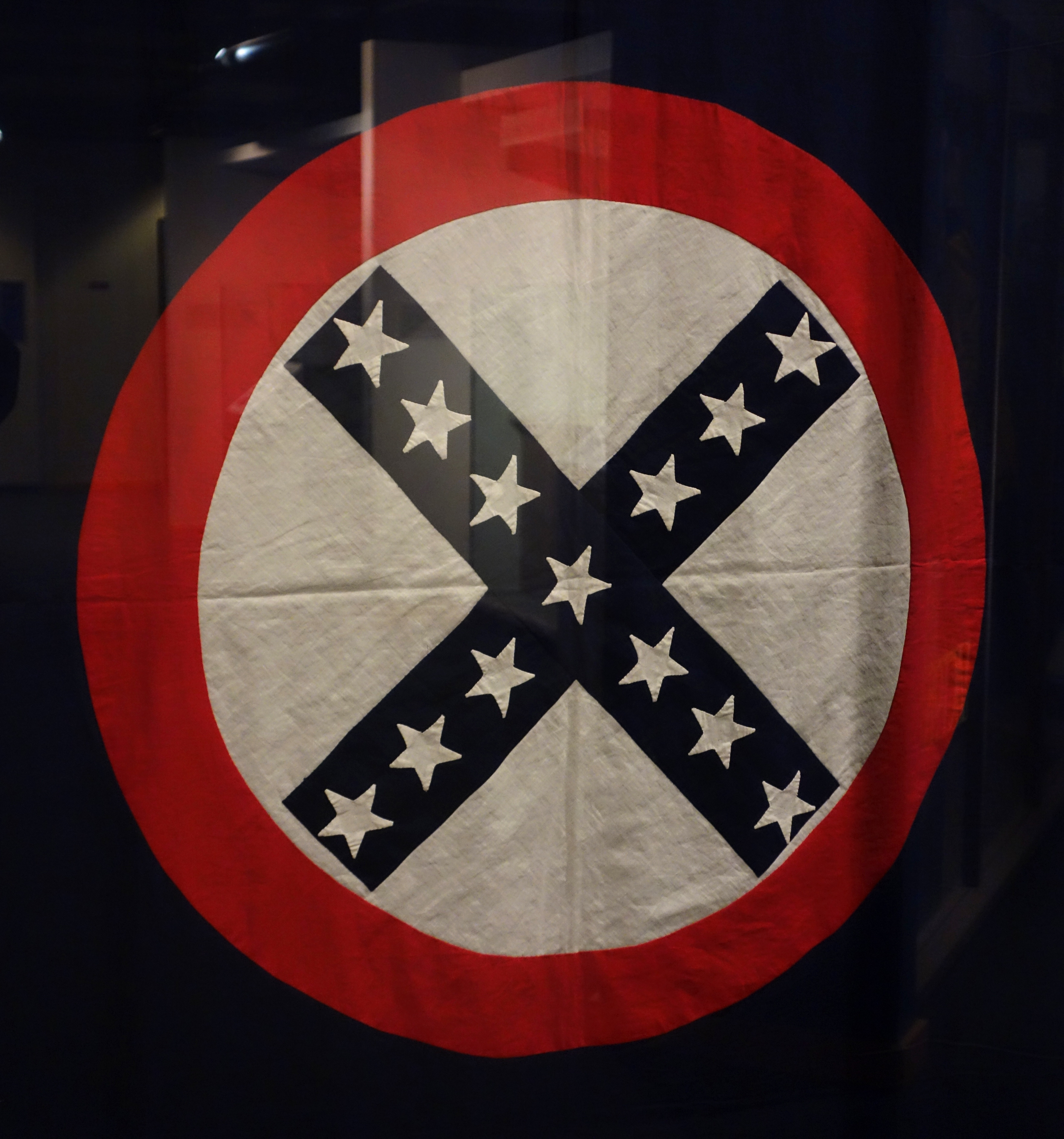
Emblem of the National Progressives of America

To announce the formation of his national third party, La Follette planned a rally in Madison. At this rally he had the area decorated in red, white, and blue, with a military band playing marching music and other patriotic songs and football players for the University of Wisconsin-Madison acting as ushers and bouncers for the event. In all, upwards of 3,500 people attended the rally. After building up enthusiasm among the attendees, La Follette unveiled a new program for his National Progressives of America (N.P.A.). The announcement of the party had drawn mixed responses from the public and other progressives. Various national liberal figures, allies of Roosevelt, organized labor, and even allies of La Follette declined to support the new party. The media offered criticism of the party platform, with many media outlets calling it vague and lacking in definite proposals, while the party itself was described as having fascist overtones. While La Follette never openly endorsed fascism, he had believed that European dictators were effective at mobilizing people and bringing them comfort and meaning, and that they should be learned from. Even harsher criticism was instead leveled at the symbol for the party, which was compared to a swastika.

After its formation, La Follette traveled the country in an attempt to recruit allies to his cause and build up the party. In response, various progressive and liberal figures declined to affiliate and expressed disinterest in the party.

While La Follette was absent from Wisconsin, the state progressive party began to collapse, as factionalism and intraparty bickering began to take hold. Additionally, many of his old allies, such as Alfonsi, felt sidelined by La Follette, as many of them did not agree with the formation of the N.P.A.. Due to his prolonged absences, La Follette appointed Immell as the National Progressive's National Director.

=== 1938 election ===
By the end of his third term, La Follette felt reluctant to seek a fourth term. Instead he felt it was more important to devote his time and energy to promoting the N.P.A., but upon being dissatisfied with the performance of Ekern, and no one else volunteering to run, he ultimately decided to run for a fourth term. By the 1938 elections, the divisions in the state Progressive Party had grown even more wide, and while La Follette and his brother remained neutral, they privately supported their ally Ekern over the more radical Amlie in the Senate primary that year, and their lack of endorsement exacerbated tensions between both sides, with supporters of Amlie threatening to leave the party over it. Even during his campaign, La Follette continued to express a hesitancy to serve a fourth term, at one point considering stating an intention to take the office if Progressives elected a majority in the state legislature.

The results in the primary election became a sign of what was to come in November, as Progressives in the primary ran tens of thousands of votes behind the Republicans and Democrats. Additionally, Republicans and Democrats began serious efforts at collaboration, whereby the party nominee with the fewest votes from each contest would withdraw. The initial Democratic nominee, Robert Kirkland Henry, withdrew in favor of Republican nominee Julius P. Heil.

While the results of the primary only caused the progressives to unify around themselves, they were unable to escape defeat in November. In an election with lower turnout, La Follette was defeated by Heil by a margin of 190,294 votes, with Republicans reclaiming the other state executive offices, the state legislature, the Class III U.S. Senate seat, and all but two congressional seats.

Part of their defeat was attributed to a lack of improvement of the conditions from the Great Depression, as well as the gradual decline in the ability for the state alone to handle the problems of the Depression. After his defeat, La Follette effectively retired from electoral politics.

== Later life and career ==
Following his defeat, La Follette attempted to keep the N.P.A. going, at the expense of the Wisconsin Progressive Party. He also decided to leave the United States and travel across Europe to see the situation there at the time. During his travels, he became increasingly troubled by the effects fascism and Nazism had on Italy and Germany respectively, with him calling fascism the "greatest menace facing the United States." Eventually, La Follette came to criticize the Franco-British policy of Appeasement towards Germany. Around this time La Follette returned to his legal career, also writing articles for The Progressive. He also actively campaigned for his brother and other progressive candidates in Wisconsin in 1940, but all of them except Robert Jr. went down in defeat.

By 1946, the Wisconsin Progressive Party had all but collapsed, barely qualifying for major party status after the 1944 elections. While La Follette, after being advised to stay out of the 1946 convention, had wanted the party to continue on, the party voted 284 to 131 to dissolve itself and rejoin the Republican Party. La Follette himself decided to support progressive candidates in the Republican Primaries that year, such as Ralph Immell. As in 1940, the progressive candidates fared poorly, all of them losing, including Robert Jr.

=== World War II ===
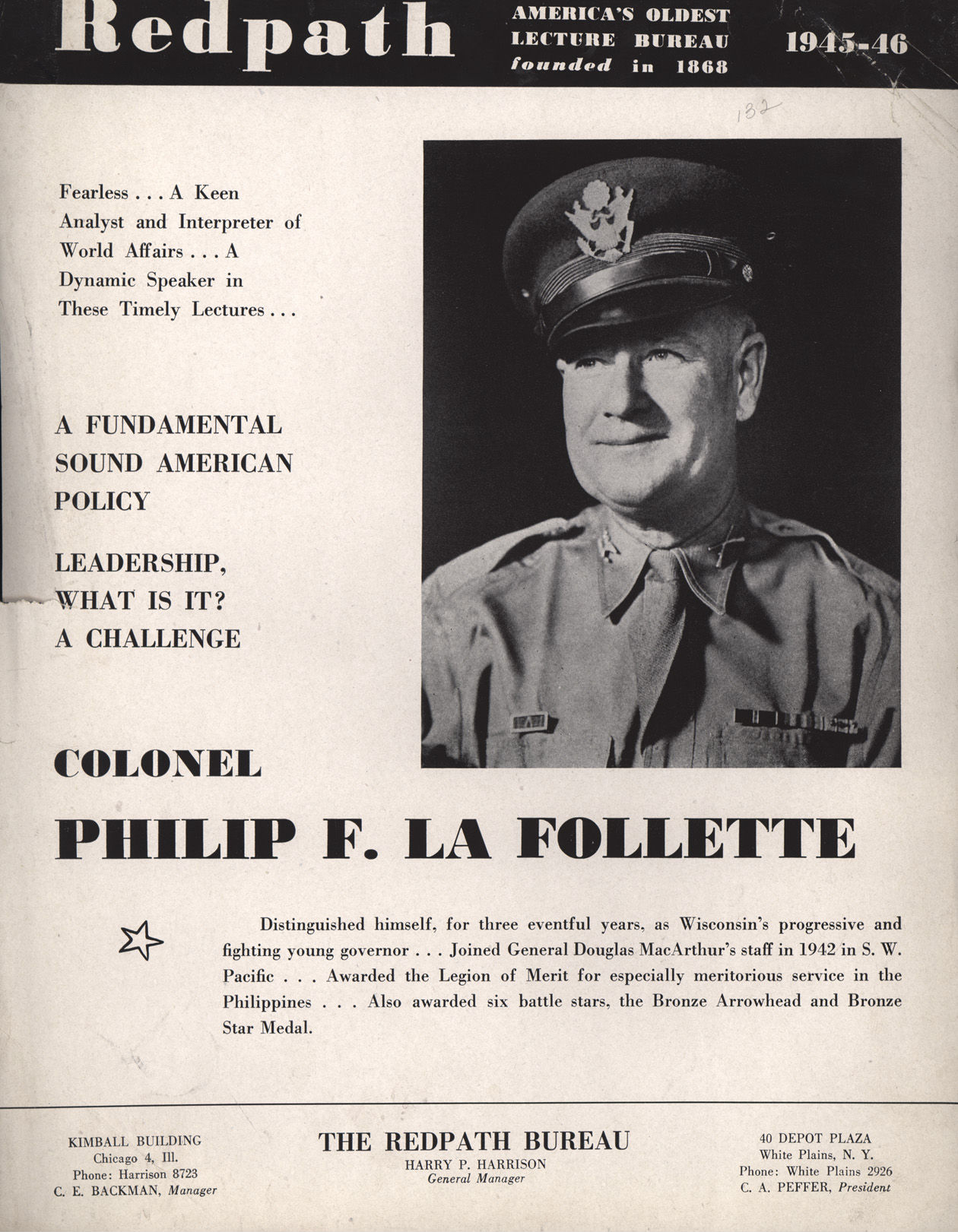
Colonel La Follette in uniform on a Redpath Bureau poster, 1945

Once the war broke out, La Follette became an isolationist, criticizing the British and French governments for not doing enough to stop the rise of Adolf Hitler. La Follette began criticizing the Roosevelt administration as well, especially its efforts to repeal the arms embargo, which he believed would lead to war between the United States and Germany and lead to a loss of liberty in the United States. Eventually, La Follette found himself involved with the America First Committee, working alongside figures such as Charles Lindbergh, which led some to assume he had shifted towards more conservative politics.

Following the Attack on Pearl Harbor, La Follette abandoned his isolationism and enlisted in the army, serving at Fort Myer, Virginia, for a time before transferring to the Pacific Theater. During La Follette's time in the Pacific, he served under General Douglas MacArthur as his public relations officer. It was in the Pacific Theater that La Follette developed an admiration for MacArthur, comparing him to Julius Caesar, George Washington, and Ulysses S. Grant. La Follette felt such a strong attachment to the general as he felt MacArthur reminded him of his father. La Follette would ultimately serve under MacArthur from October 1942 until June 1945.

After the war, La Follette made an effort to rebuild his legal office, pursue other ventures, and become more involved in the lives of his children. La Follette was offered a position as military governor of Bavaria, which had been within the American occupation zone in Germany. Despite his own personal desire to take up the role, he eventually turned down the offer, citing both monetary concerns and his belief that he did not have the support of President Harry S. Truman.

=== Later campaigns and business ventures ===
Following the war, La Follette re-entered the Wisconsin political scene, this time in support of MacArthur's brief 1948 presidential campaign. To this end, he would spearhead a slate of delegates to the 1948 Republican National Convention supporting MacArthur's nomination for the presidency. Such a slate included many people La Follette had opposed during the Great Depression, but worked without of a common interest to support MacArthur, a fact which perplexed many of his contemporaries. In the general election, he endorsed Thomas E. Dewey over incumbent president Truman. He also supported the presidential campaigns of Earl Warren and Dwight D. Eisenhower in 1952.

In March 1940, La Follette was elected to the board of directors of Fairbanks-Morse. In 1946, La Follette began working for the Hazeltine Corporation as associate general counsel for the company. Working for the company often forced him to travel between Wisconsin and New York, and La Follette eventually moved to New York City with his family in 1955, when he was elected president of Hazeltine's Electronics Division.

== Death ==
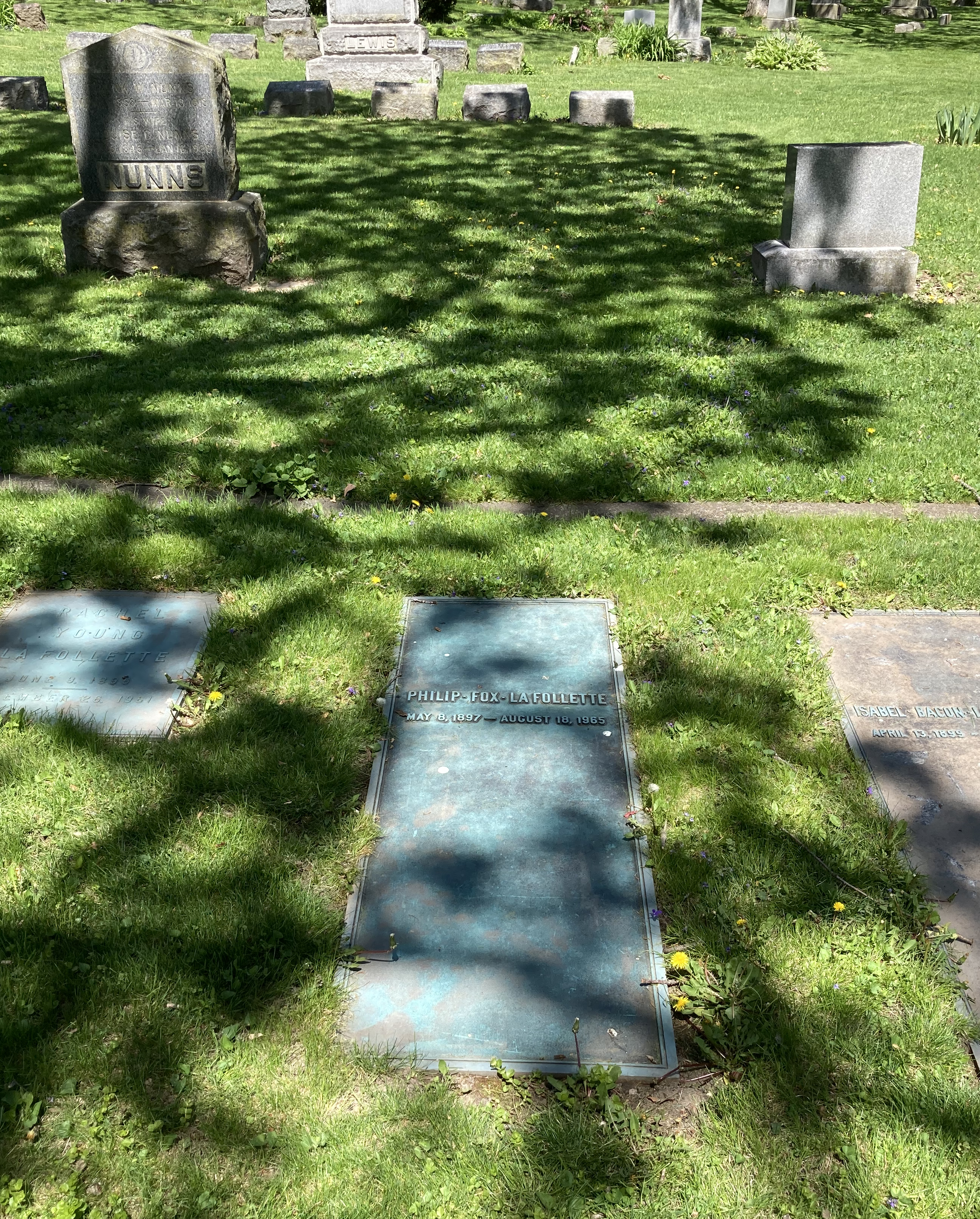
La Follette's grave at Forest Hill Cemetery

After his time at Hazeltine, La Follette returned to Madison, where he retired to practice law part-time and continue writing his autobiography. It was also during this time that he was active as part of the Wisconsin Historical Society.

He died in Madison, Wisconsin on August 18, 1965 and was buried at Forest Hill Cemetery.

== Personal life and family ==
La Follette married Isabel Bacon in 1923, and had three children with her; Robert III, Judith, and Sherry, born 1926, 1929, and 1936 respectively; none of them went on to pursue careers in politics.

Phil was part of the La Follette family, which included his brother, Robert M. La Follette Jr., his nephew Bronson La Follette, his sister Fola La Follette, and by way of her marriage, also playwright George Middleton.

== Electoral history ==
=== Wisconsin governor (1930–1938) ===
Year	Election	Date	Elected				Defeated				Total	Plurality
1930	Primary	Sep. 16	Philip La Follette	Republican	339,551	59.64%	Walter J. Kohler Sr. (inc)	Rep.	267,687	40.36%	663,238	71,864
1930	General	Nov. 4	Philip La Follette	Republican	392,958	64.76%	Charles E. Hammersley	Dem.	170,020	28.02%	606,825	222,938
1930	General	Nov. 4	Philip La Follette	Republican	392,958	64.76%	Frank Metcalfe	Soc.	25,607	4.22%	606,825	222,938
1930	General	Nov. 4	Philip La Follette	Republican	392,958	64.76%	Alfred B. Taynton	Pro.	14,818	2.44%	606,825	222,938
1930	General	Nov. 4	Philip La Follette	Republican	392,958	64.76%	Fred Basset Blair	Ind.	2,998	0.49%	606,825	222,938
1932	Primary	Sep. 20	Walter J. Kohler Sr.	Republican	414,575	56.45%	Philip La Follette (inc)	Rep.	319,884	43.55%	734,459	94,691
1934	Primary	Sep. 18	Philip La Follette	Progressive	154,454	95.36%	Henry O. Meisel	Prog.	7,520	4.64%	161,974	146,934
1934	General	Nov. 6	Philip La Follette	Progressive	373,093	39.12%	Albert G. Schmedeman (incumbent)	Dem.	359,467	37.69%	953,797	13,626
1934	General	Nov. 6	Philip La Follette	Progressive	373,093	39.12%	Howard T. Greene	Rep.	172,980	18.14%	953,797	13,626
1934	General	Nov. 6	Philip La Follette	Progressive	373,093	39.12%	George A. Nelson	Soc.	44,589	4.68%	953,797	13,626
1934	General	Nov. 6	Philip La Follette	Progressive	373,093	39.12%	Morris Childs	Ind.	2,454	0.26%	953,797	13,626
1934	General	Nov. 6	Philip La Follette	Progressive	373,093	39.12%	Thomas W. North	Ind.	857	0.09%	953,797	13,626
1934	General	Nov. 6	Philip La Follette	Progressive	373,093	39.12%	Joseph Ehrhardt	Ind.	332	0.03%	953,797	13,626
1936	General	Nov. 3	Philip La Follette (inc)	Progressive	573,724	46.38%	Alexander Wiley	Rep.	363,973	29.42%	1,237,095	209,751
1936	General	Nov. 3	Philip La Follette (inc)	Progressive	573,724	46.38%	Arthur W. Lueck	Dem.	268,530	21.71%	1,237,095	209,751
1936	General	Nov. 3	Philip La Follette (inc)	Progressive	573,724	46.38%	Joseph F. Walsh	Uni.	27,934	2.26%	1,237,095	209,751
1936	General	Nov. 3	Philip La Follette (inc)	Progressive	573,724	46.38%	Joseph Ehrhardt	Soc	1,738	0.14%	1,237,095	209,751
1936	General	Nov. 3	Philip La Follette (inc)	Progressive	573,724	46.38%	August F. Fehlandt	Pro.	1,008	0.08%	1,237,095	209,751
1938	Primary	Sep. 20	Philip La Follette (inc)	Progressive	136,291	80.21%	Glenn P. Turner	Prog.	33,631	19.79%	169,922	102,660
1938	General	Nov. 8	Julius P. Heil	Republican	543,675	55.39%	Philip La Follette (inc)	Prog.	353,381	36.00%	981,560	190,294
1938	General	Nov. 8	Julius P. Heil	Republican	543,675	55.39%	Harry W. Bolens	Dem.	78,446	7.99%	981,560	190,294
1938	General	Nov. 8	Julius P. Heil	Republican	543,675	55.39%	Frank W. Smith	Uni.	4,564	0.47%	981,560	190,294
1938	General	Nov. 8	Julius P. Heil	Republican	543,675	55.39%	John Schleier Jr.	Ind.	1,459	0.15%	981,560	190,294

== Works ==
- La Follette, Philip Fox, Adventure in politics: the memoirs of Philip La Follette edited by Donald Young, New York: Holt, Rinehart and Winston, 1970.

Party political offices
Preceded by Walter J. Kohler, Sr.	Republican nominee for Governor of Wisconsin; 1930	Succeeded by Walter J. Kohler, Sr.
New party	Progressive nominee for Governor of Wisconsin; 1934, 1936, 1938	Succeeded by Orland Steen Loomis
Political offices
Preceded by Walter J. Kohler, Sr.	Governor of Wisconsin; January 5, 1931 – January 2, 1933	Succeeded by Albert G. Schmedeman
Preceded by Albert G. Schmedeman	Governor of Wisconsin; January 7, 1935 – January 2, 1939	Succeeded by Julius P. Heil
Legal offices
Preceded by Theodore G. Lewis	District Attorney of Dane County, Wisconsin; January 1, 1925 – January 1, 1927	Succeeded by Glenn D. Roberts
Awards and achievements
Preceded by Harry F. Byrd	Cover of Time magazine 22 October 1928	Succeeded by Lord Melchett
