= Walter J. Kohler Sr. =

American politician

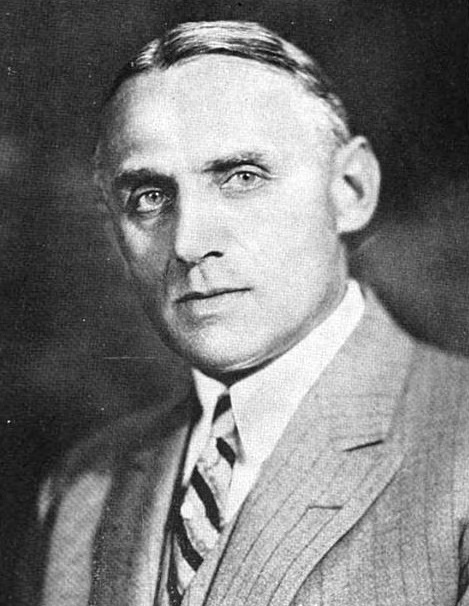
- Kohler as depicted in 1929's Wisconsin Blue Book

26th Governor of Wisconsin
- In office January 7, 1929 – January 5, 1931
- Lieutenant: Henry A. Huber
- Preceded by: Fred R. Zimmerman
- Succeeded by: Philip La Follette

Personal details
- Born: Walter Jodok Kohler; March 3, 1875 Sheboygan, Wisconsin, US
- Died: April 21, 1940 (aged 65) Sheboygan, Wisconsin, US
- Resting place: Woodland Cemetery; Kohler, Wisconsin
- Party: Republican
- Spouses: Charlotte H. Schroeder; (m. 1900; died 1947)
- Children: John Michael Kohler; Walter Jodok Kohler Jr.; Carl James Kohler; Robert Eugene Kohler
- Parents: John Michael Kohler (father); Elizabeth (Vollrath) Kohler (mother)
- Profession: Businessman

Walter Jodok Kohler Sr., (March 3, 1875 – April 21, 1940) was an American businessman and politician from the Kohler family of Wisconsin. He was an innovative and highly successful Wisconsin industrialist. The Kohler Company was founded by his father, John Michael Kohler. Walter Kohler served as the company's president from 1905 to 1937. Walter Kohler was elected the 26th governor of Wisconsin as a Republican, serving one term from 1929 to 1931. A moderate, pro-business Republican who admired Calvin Coolidge and Herbert Hoover, Kohler sparred with the left and right of his party before and during the Great Depression. His son, Walter J. Kohler Jr., also served as governor, from 1951 to 1957.

== Personal life ==
Graves of Walter and Charlotte Kohler at Woodland Kohler Village Cemetery

Walter Kohler was born on March 3, 1875, in Sheboygan, Wisconsin, the third of six children born to industrialist and civic leader John Michael Kohler II (1844–1900) and his wife, the former Lillie Vollrath (1848–1883). John Michael headed a prosperous company selling iron and plumbing products, as well as enamelware. Lillie's father was a wealthy local businessman in the same general field. The Kohlers and the Vollraths have enjoyed close family and business relations to this day.

Walter grew up in the family's home in Sheboygan. His formal education stopped at the eighth grade when at age 15 he persuaded his father to hire him full-time in the company business.

Five years after his father's death in 1900, 30-year-old Walter took over what would soon be called the Kohler Company. A few days before his father died, Walter married Charlotte Henrietta "Lottie" Schroeder (1869–1947), a Kenosha school teacher. They had four sons: John Michael Kohler III (1902–68), Walter Jodok Jr. (1904–76), Carl James (1905–60), and Robert Eugene (1908–90).

In the early 1920s, Walter built a lavish estate named Riverbend. It was constructed near the family factory in what was now the Village of Kohler, 4 miles (6.4 km) west of Sheboygan. Riverbend's estimated cost was over $1 million; in 1928 it seems that Walter's total income was $3 million a year.

Kohler was highly active in civic affairs and Republican Party (GOP) politics, but devoted almost all of his time and considerable energy to his growing and successful company. The great depression, two reelection defeats, a violent company strike, and a federal lawsuit severely affected him. He died in 1940, and was buried at Woodland Kohler Village Cemetery. The corporate reins were given to Walter's half-brother Herbert Vollrath Kohler (1891–1968), who had spent much of his life laboring in the factory.

== Business career ==
The Kohler Company grew rapidly in the early twentieth century, developing new products such as the industry's first one-piece built-in bathtub. By 1914, the Company employed 950 people and had sales offices in four major American cities and in London. In the First World War, the Company shifted to production of war materials. But in the 1920s it expanded its products and sales, building, among other things, a motor powered dishwasher, an electric clothes washer, and a gasoline powered generator. Kohler created the world's largest pottery plant to mass-produce toilets and sinks.

Kohler reduced work hours for his employees, paid above-average salaries, provided group life and health insurance and workingmen's compensation, and presented holiday and retirement gifts. Beginning in 1917, his plan for a nearby housing complex for Kohler workers began to become a reality. Kohler Village, a 4.5-square-mile (12 km^{2}) area, was designed to provide high quality and affordable home ownership in a beautiful and rationally designed community. The following year, the Company opened The American Club across the street from the main factory, a Tudor-style living and recreational facility for some 250 newly arrived immigrants.

The Great Depression forced the Kohler Company to slow production and limit hours. Kohler tried to keep his workers employed and well-paid, but the cutbacks were unpopular. In 1934, some long-time employees and several outside labor leaders joined hands to call a strike.

== As governor ==
Walter J. Kohler was a gubernatorial candidate in 1928. The Republican Party had dominated Wisconsin since its founding in the mid-nineteenth century, and winning the Party's nomination was tantamount to election. Still, it was badly split between conservative Stalwarts and La Follette Progressives. Kohler was a Stalwart who had been active in the GOP since being named a presidential elector in 1916.

Kohler put on a vigorous campaign, noting his success in business, his lifelong commitment to hard work, and promising to ignore the spoils system when making appointments and promotions. He invited voters to come to Kohler and view working conditions and the industrial village. Many did.

Walter was the first political candidate to travel through the state by airplane, covering 7,280 miles (11,720 km) in one two-week stretch. He also traveled by automobile, trying to reach the 1.5 million voters in a 3 million population. Progressives condemned him for his "anti-union shop" attitude, but he countered with the fact that Company wages were 28.9 percent higher than the average state factory level, that 92 percent of all married men in Kohler owned their own lots and homes, and that 75 percent of them owned their own cars.

Kohler won the nomination by a large margin and went to Madison, Wisconsin, where he and the legislature eliminated a deficit estimated at $3.5 million, streamlined state bureaucracy, built roads and state parks, and kept taxes low. But the Great Depression ended his political career. Kohler seemed too much like his friend President Herbert Hoover, and most voters wanted change. Progressive Philip La Follette won the primary and election in 1930, joining the state's two Progressive Senators in a popular attempt to end the financial collapse that was wreaking havoc throughout the nation and much of the world.

Despite serving only a single two-year term as Governor, Kohler made five appointments to the Wisconsin Supreme Court, due to four deaths and one retirement. It was by far the largest number of appointments in any two year period in the history of the court.

Kohler ran again in 1932 and won the GOP nomination for governor. He voiced strong support for President Hoover, a tactic that backfired. Kohler's political career ended as both Progressives and Democrats enjoyed the national landslide that put Franklin D. Roosevelt in the White House. Roosevelt carried Wisconsin with 63.5 percent of the vote. Republicans reclaimed the governorship in 1939, remaining in control of the office for the next twenty years. One of those GOP governors was Walter Kohler's son, Walter J. Kohler Jr.

== The Kohler strike of 1934 ==
Kohler was a staunch believer in the "open shop" and, along with many other industrialists, did not want national unions to represent all employees and dictate company policy. He and a majority of his workers created a company union in 1933, but this did not satisfy labor leaders. A year later, with strikes breaking out throughout the nation, the American Federation of Labor focused on the Kohler Company. It made 14 demands, including a 62.5 percent wage increase. Kohler rejected the demands and shut down the plant.

The first Kohler strike began on July 16. Pickets blocked access to the plant and violence on both sides quickly broke out. Bullets and tear gas entered the scene on July 27, and two men were killed and 43 injured before the National Guard arrived and restored peace.

In 1935 his employees voted to form a company union; but that same year Congress passed the Wagner Act, encouraging major unions to organize under the authority of the federal government and prohibiting company unions.

In March 1940 a federal grand jury indicted 104 companies, unions, and individuals on charges of conspiracy to freeze high plumbing prices. Among the companies named were the nation's three largest plumbing companies, including Kohler. The following month, Kohler died of a sudden heart attack. Friends and relatives attributed the death to the strike and to the federal government's challenge to his personal integrity.

A second Kohler Strike broke out in 1954, becoming the longest labor-management dispute in national history.

== Electoral history ==
Wisconsin gubernatorial election, 1928
Party	Candidate	Votes	%	±%
Primary election, September 4, 1928
Republican	Walter J. Kohler Sr.	224,421	39.47%	
Republican	Joseph D. Beck	203,359	35.77%	
Republican	Fred R. Zimmerman (incumbent)	82,837	14.57%	
Democratic	Albert G. Schmedeman	41,459	7.29%	
Socialist	Otto R. Hauser	12,013	2.11%	
Republican	John E. Ferris	3,448	0.61%	
Prohibition	Adolph R. Bucknam	527	0.09%	
Prohibition	Jane H. Robinson	477	0.08%	
Total votes		'568,541'	'100.0%'	
General election, November 6, 1928
Republican	Walter J. Kohler Sr.	547,738	55.38%	−8.09%
Democratic	Albert G. Schmedeman	394,368	39.87%	+26.73%
Socialist	Otto R. Hauser	36,924	3.73%	−3.55%
Prohibition	Adolph R. Bucknam	6,477	0.65%	−0.67%
Socialist Labor	Joseph Ehrhardt	1,938	0.20%	−0.63%
Communist	Alvar J. Hayes	1,420	0.14%	
	Scattering	278	0.03%	
Total votes		'989,143'	'100.0%'	+78.90%
Republican hold				

Wisconsin gubernatorial election, 1930
Party	Candidate	Votes	%	±%
Primary election, September 1930
Republican	Philip La Follette	395,551	57.05%	
Republican	Walter J. Kohler Sr. (incumbent)	267,687	38.61%	
Democratic	Charles E. Hammersley	17,040	2.46%	
Socialist	Frank Metcalfe	11,569	1.67%	
Prohibition	Alfred B. Taynton	655	0.08%	
Prohibition	Adolph R. Bucknam	503	0.09%	
Prohibition	Henry Meisel	330	0.09%	
Total votes		'693,335'	'100.0%'	
General election, November 4, 1930
Republican	Philip La Follette	392,958	64.76%	+9.38%
Democratic	Charles E. Hammersley	170,020	28.02%	−11.85%
Socialist	Frank Metcalfe	25,607	4.22%	+0.49%
Prohibition	Alfred B. Taynton	14,818	2.44%	+1.79%
Communist	Fred Basset Blair	2,998	0.49%	+0.35%
	Scattering	424	0.07%	
Total votes		'606,825'	'100.0%'	-38.65%
Republican hold				

Wisconsin gubernatorial election, 1932
Party	Candidate	Votes	%	±%
Primary election, September 1932
Republican	Walter J. Kohler Sr.	414,575	46.09%	
Republican	Philip La Follette (incumbent)	319,884	35.56%	
Democratic	Albert G. Schmedeman	58,098	6.46%	
Democratic	William R. Rubin	44,556	4.95%	
Socialist	Frank Metcalfe	31,836	3.54%	
Democratic	Leo P. Fox	29,276	3.25%	
Prohibition	William C. Dean	717	0.08%	
Prohibition	Adolph R. Bucknam	616	0.07%	
Total votes		'899,558'	'100.0%'	
General election, November 8, 1932
Democratic	Albert G. Schmedeman	590,114	52.48%	+24.46%
Republican	Walter J. Kohler Sr.	470,805	41.87%	−22.89%
Socialist	Frank Metcalfe	56,965	5.07%	+0.85%
Prohibition	William C. Dean	3,148	0.28%	−2.16%
Communist	Fred Basset Blair	2,926	0.26%	−0.23%
Socialist Labor	Joseph Ehrhardt	398	0.04%	
	Scattering	146	0.01%	
Total votes		'1,124,502'	'100.0%'	+85.31%
Democratic gain from Republican				

Party political offices
Preceded by Fred R. Zimmerman	Republican nominee for Governor of Wisconsin; 1928	Succeeded by Philip La Follette
Preceded by Philip La Follette	Republican nominee for Governor of Wisconsin; 1932	Succeeded by Howard Greene
Political offices
Preceded by Fred R. Zimmerman	Governor of Wisconsin; 1929 – 1931	Succeeded by Philip La Follette
