= Little New Deal =

Wisconsin reforms in response to the Great Depression in the United States

- Location: Wisconsin
- Organized by: Governor Philip Fox La Follette

The Little New Deal also referred to as Wisconsin's Little New Deal or Wisconsin's New Deal was a series of rural, economic, social and political reforms in response to the Great Depression in the United States within Wisconsin under the Republican and Progressive Governorship of Philip Fox La Follette.

In 1931 Wisconsin became the first state in the United States to enact a "Union Bill of Rights" and Unemployment Laws, in the early years the Wisconsin progressives often informally aligned themselves with the national New Deal of Franklin D. Roosevelt. During the late 1930s it became difficult to place Philip's policies on whether they were politically to the left or to the right of the national New Deal with Philip being accused of authoritarianism, fascism and demagoguery.

== History ==
Wisconsin was the first state in the United States to start implementing statewide reforms which would go on to influence many policies of the national New Deal of Franklin D. Roosevelt. The Little New Deal implemented laws such as a Union Bill of rights, Rural Electrification, Reorganization Orders, Unemployment Composition, Conservation and a Wisconsin Works Bill. By 1938, Philip sought a return to the policy of the "old days" in which

"our country did not pay people to remain idle or to do unproductive work. We gave everyone an opportunity to do wealth-creating work. If they did not take that offer, they could sink or swim as they pleased. Today we have idle resources, and also idle people.... Again we must provide every able-bodied man and woman with a real opportunity for wealth-creating work at decent hours and at decent pay. Then, let us return to the principle that he who is able and does not work—well, then, at least he shall not live at the expense of his neighbor."

== See also ==
- National Progressives of America
- Robert Marion La Follette Jr
