= John Paulu =

American politician (1850–1930)

John Paulu (1850–1930) was an American politician. He was a member of the Wisconsin State Assembly.

== Biography ==
Paulu was born in Bohemia, Austrian Empire, in 1850. When he was sixteen he learned the architect and building trades. He settled in Milwaukee, Wisconsin in 1871 before moving to Lake, Milwaukee County, Wisconsin in 1889. He got married in 1887 and had six kids.

== Career ==
Paulu was elected to the Assembly in 1912, defeating incumbent Frank Metcalfe. Metcalfe would later accuse him of corruption during the campaign. Additionally, Paulu was Chairman of Supervisors of Lake, a member of the Milwaukee County, Wisconsin Board, and a justice of the peace for eleven years.
