= Charles E. Hammersley =

American politician

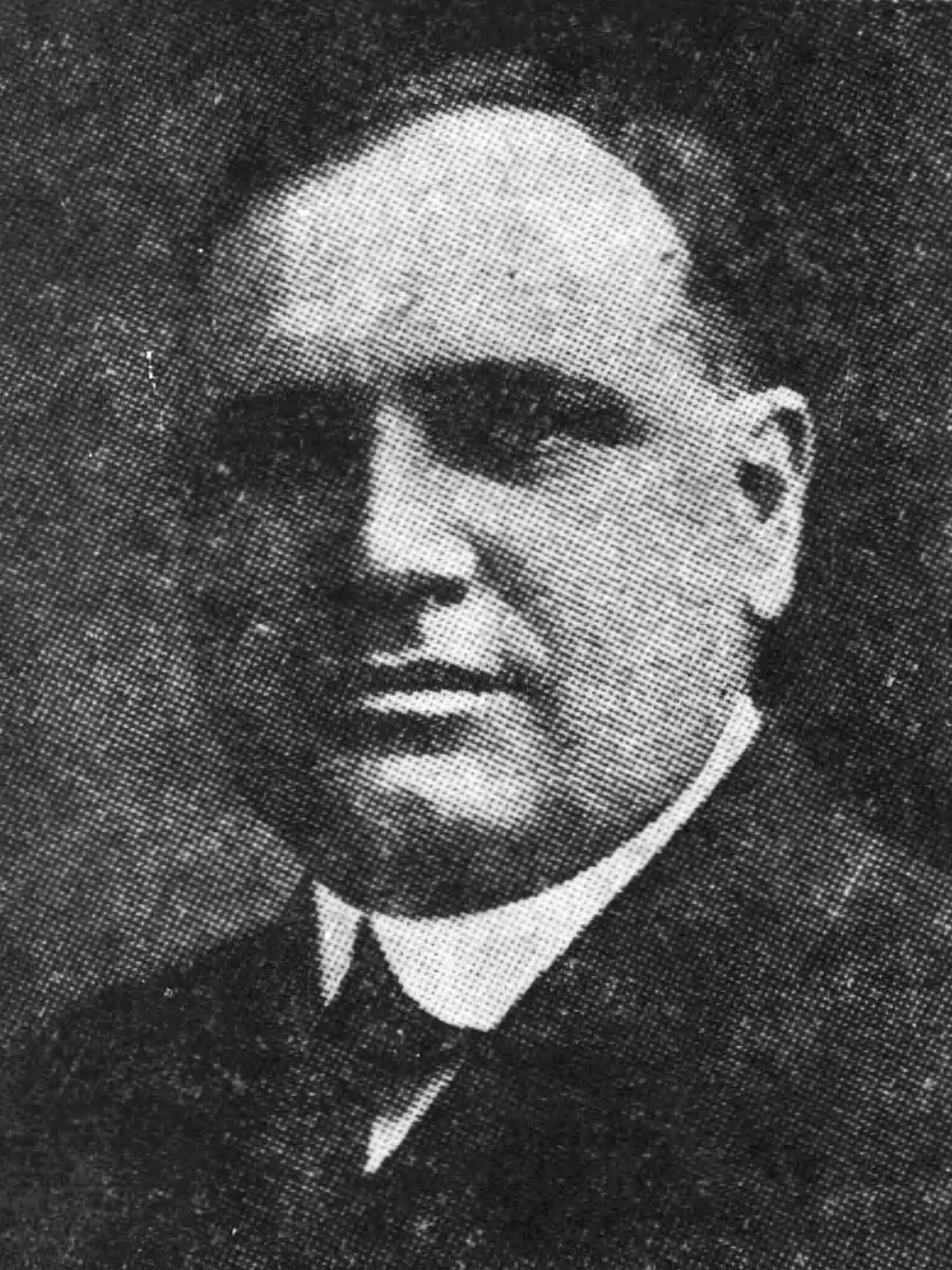
Hammersley c. 1927

Charles E. Hammersley was an American politician. He was born in Milwaukee, Wisconsin. He was a Democrat and was a candidate for governor in 1930, when he ran against Philip La Follette and lost. He was a delegate to the Democratic National Convention in 1936 and 1940. He died in 1957 and is buried at the Forest Home Cemetery in Milwaukee.

Party political offices
Preceded by Albert G. Schmedeman	Democratic nominee for Governor of Wisconsin; 1930	Succeeded by Albert G. Schmedeman
