= Albert G. Schmedeman =

American politician and diplomat (1864–1946)

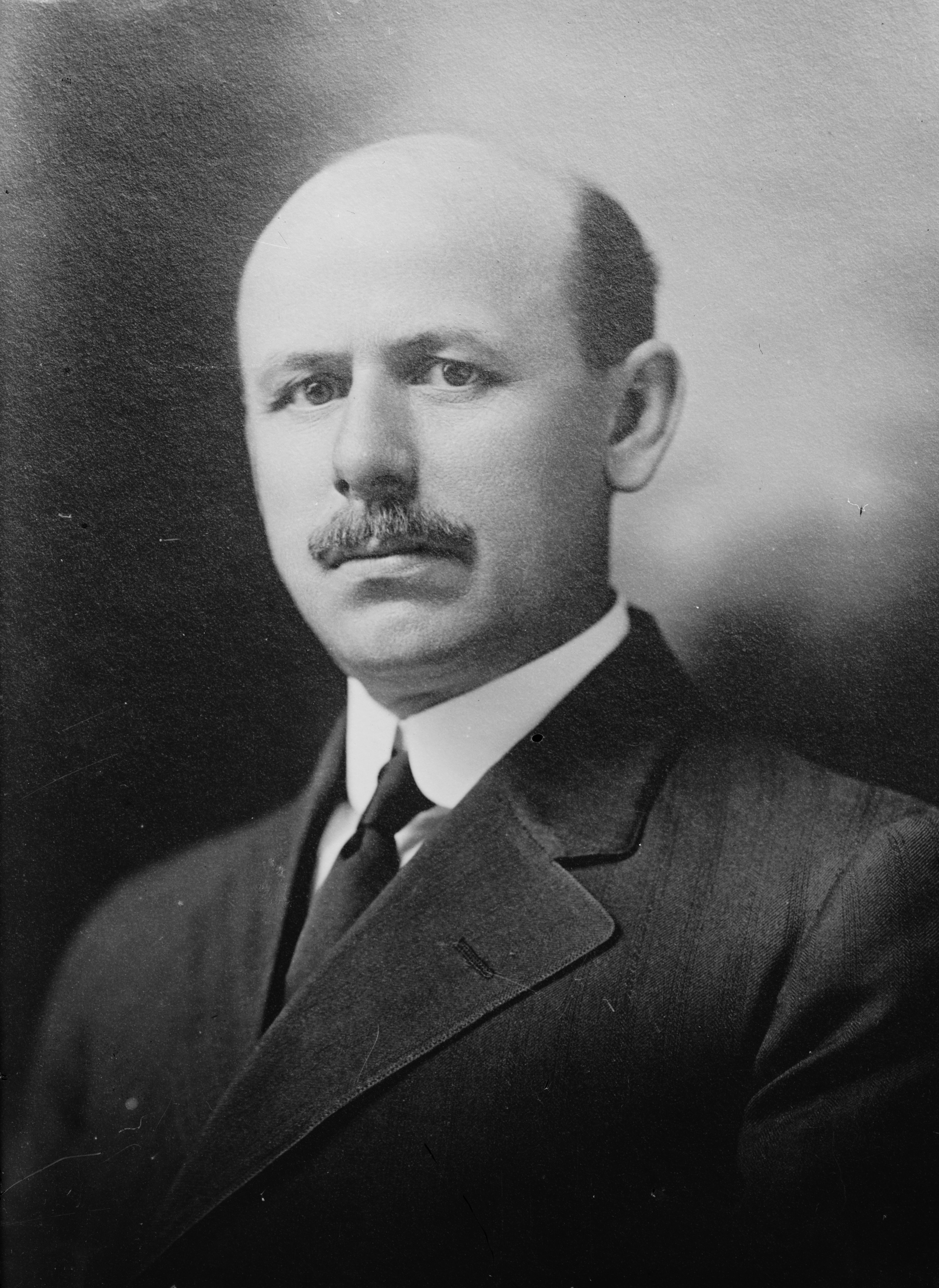

28th Governor of Wisconsin
- In office January 2, 1933 – January 7, 1935
- Lieutenant: Thomas J. O'Malley
- Preceded by: Philip La Follette
- Succeeded by: Philip La Follette

4th United States Minister to Norway
- In office October 4, 1913 – July 29, 1921
- President: Woodrow Wilson; Warren G. Harding
- Preceded by: Laurits S. Swenson
- Succeeded by: Laurits S. Swenson

41st Mayor of Madison, Wisconsin
- In office April 1925 – January 2, 1933
- Preceded by: Isaac Milo Kittleson
- Succeeded by: James R. Law Jr.

Personal details
- Born: Albert George Schmedeman; November 25, 1864 Madison, Wisconsin, U.S.
- Died: November 26, 1946 (aged 82) Madison, Wisconsin, U.S.
- Resting place: Forest Hill Cemetery, Madison
- Party: Democratic
- Spouses: Katherine Regan; (died 1948)
- Children: 2
- Awards: Order of St. Olav

Albert George Schmedeman (November 25, 1864 – November 26, 1946) was a German American politician and diplomat. He was the 28th governor of Wisconsin and was U.S. Minister to Norway during the presidency of Woodrow Wilson and during the negotiations ending World War I. He was mayor of Madison, Wisconsin, for four terms, and, to date, is the only mayor of Madison to be elected governor of Wisconsin. He was the only Democratic governor of Wisconsin between 1895 and 1959, a period when Wisconsin was more often than not essentially a one-party Republican state where third parties often provided stronger opposition than did the Democratic Party.

== Biography ==
Schmedeman was born in Madison, Wisconsin, the son of Heinrich Schmedeman, a "Forty-Eighter" from Germany. Albert Schmedeman was elected to the Madison City Council in 1904, serving for four years. He also served the community as fire and police commissioner, and as a member of the local board of education.

A Democrat, Schmedeman ran for a seat in the United States House of Representatives in 1910, but lost to John M. Nelson. In 1913 he was appointed the United States Minister to Norway and held this position until 1921. During that time, Schmedeman accepted the Nobel Peace Prize on behalf of President Woodrow Wilson in 1919, and was awarded the Grand Cross of the Order of St. Olaf in 1921 by Haakon VII.

After concluding his service as Minister to Norway, Schmedeman planned to retire from politics, but was, instead, elected mayor of Madison, serving from 1926 to 1932. In 1932 he was elected Governor of Wisconsin and served from 1933 to 1935. His term was both preceded and succeeded by Philip La Follette, son of former governor Robert M. La Follette Sr.

During Schmedeman’s time as governor, a Farm Credit Administration was set up to help farmers.

In 1934, while attending the dedication for Rib Mountain State Park and campaigning for a second term, Schmedeman slipped on some loose rock and injured his foot. Gangrene developed, necessitating the amputation of his leg.

After his service as governor concluded, Schmedeman went on to be named Federal Housing Administrator for Wisconsin by President Franklin D. Roosevelt, a post that he held from 1935 until 1942 he died in Madison on November 26 1946 at age 82.

Schmedeman was fluent in German and also proficient in Norwegian.

Party political offices
| Preceded by Virgil H. Cady | Democratic nominee for Governor of Wisconsin; 1928 | Succeeded by Charles E. Hammersley |
| Preceded by Charles E. Hammersley | Democratic nominee for Governor of Wisconsin; 1932, 1934 | Succeeded by Arthur W. Lueck |
Political offices
| Preceded by Isaac Milo Kittleson | Mayor of Madison; 1925 – 1933 | Succeeded by James R. Law Jr. |
| Preceded by Philip La Follette | Governor of Wisconsin; 1933 – 1935 | Succeeded by Philip La Follette |
Diplomatic posts
| Preceded by Laurits S. Swenson | United States Minister to Norway; 1913 – 1921 | Succeeded by Laurits S. Swenson |
