= 1928 Wisconsin gubernatorial election =

- November 6, 1928
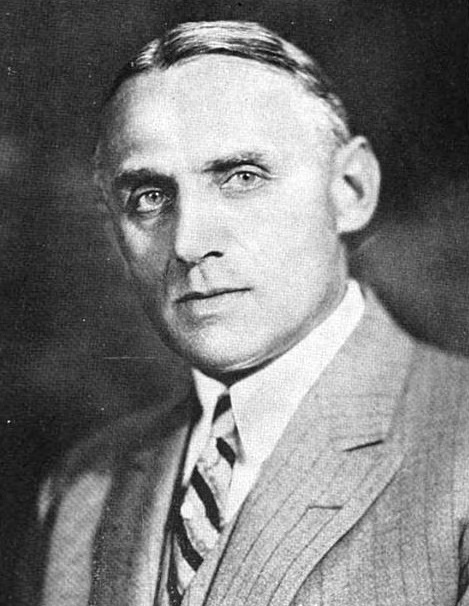

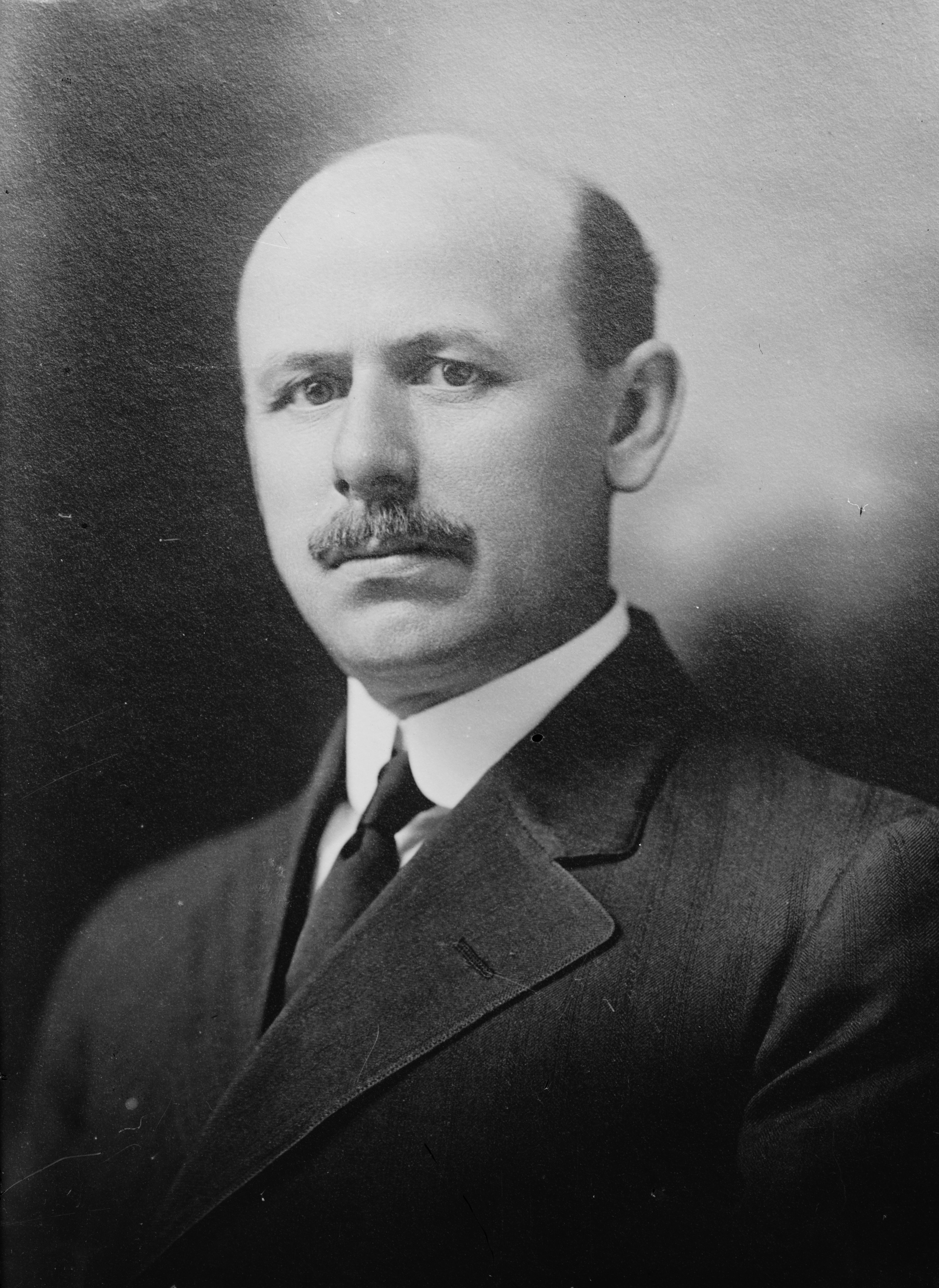
Nominee	Walter J. Kohler Sr.	Albert G. Schmedeman
Party	Republican	Democratic
Popular vote	547,738	394,368
Percentage	55.38%	39.87%
- County results Kohler: 40–50% 50–60% 60–70% 70–80% 80–90% >90% Schmedeman: 40–50% 50–60% 60–70%
Governor before election
Fred R. Zimmerman
Republican
Elected Governor
Walter J. Kohler Sr.
Republican

The 1928 Wisconsin gubernatorial election was held on November 6, 1928. Primary elections were held on September 4, 1928. Incumbent Republican Governor Fred R. Zimmerman was defeated in the Republican primary. Republican nominee Walter J. Kohler Sr. defeated Democratic nominee Albert G. Schmedeman with 55.38% of the vote.

== Primary election ==
=== Republican party ===
==== Candidates ====
- Joseph D. Beck, U.S. Representative for Wisconsin's 7th congressional district
- John E. Ferris, Independent Republican nominee for Lieutenant Governor in 1924
- Walter J. Kohler Sr., industrialist
- Fred R. Zimmerman, incumbent Governor

==== Results ====
Republican primary results
Party	Candidate	Votes	%
Republican	Walter J. Kohler Sr.	224,421	43.66%
Republican	Joseph D. Beck	203,359	39.56%
Republican	Fred R. Zimmerman (incumbent)	82,837	16.11%
Republican	John E. Ferris	3,448	0.67%
Total votes		514,065	100.00%

=== Democratic party ===
==== Candidates ====
- Albert G. Schmedeman, mayor of Madison

==== Results ====
Democratic primary results
Party	Candidate	Votes	%
Democratic	Albert G. Schmedeman	41,459	100.00%
Total votes		41,459	100.00%

=== Social-Democratic party ===
==== Candidates ====
- Oscar Ameringer (withdrew), newspaper editor (Note: Ameringer was selected at the Social-Democratic convention, prior to the primary. He withdrew before the primary took place and was replaced with Hauser by the state executive committee.)
- Otto R. Hauser, realtor

==== Results ====
Social-Democratic primary results
Party	Candidate	Votes	%
Social-Democratic	Otto R. Hauser	12,013	100.00%
Total votes		12,013	100.00%

=== Prohibition primary ===
==== Candidates ====
- Adolph R. Bucknam, Prohibition nominee for U.S. Senate in 1922 and for Governor in 1924
- Jane H. Robinson

==== Results ====
Prohibition primary results
Party	Candidate	Votes	%
Prohibition	Adolph R. Bucknam	527	52.49%
Prohibition	Jane H. Robinson	477	47.51%
Total votes		1,004	100.00%

=== Other party nominations ===
- Joseph Ehrhardt, Socialist Labor
- Alvar J. Hayes, Workers

== General election ==
=== Results ===
1928 Wisconsin gubernatorial election
Party	Candidate	Votes	%	±%
Republican	Walter J. Kohler Sr.	547,738	55.38%	−8.09%
Democratic	Albert G. Schmedeman	394,368	39.87%	+26.73%
Social-Democratic	Otto R. Hauser	36,924	3.73%	−3.55%
Prohibition	Adolph R. Bucknam	6,477	0.65%	−0.67%
Socialist Labor (Note: "Independent Labor")	Joseph Ehrhardt	1,938	0.20%	−0.63%
Workers (Note: "Independent Workers")	Alvar J. Hayes	1,420	0.14%	
	Scattering	278	0.03%	
Majority		153,370	15.51%	
Total votes		989,143	100.00%	
Republican hold		Swing	-34.12%	

=== Results by county ===
County	Walter J. Kohler Sr. Republican		Albert G. Schmedeman Democratic		Otto R. Hauser Social-Democratic		Adolph R. Bucknam Prohibition		All Others Various		Margin		Total votes cast
County	#	%	#	%	#	%	#	%	#	%	#	%	Total votes cast
Adams	1,418	59.43%	903	37.85%	22	0.92%	32	1.34%	11	0.46%	515	21.58%	2,386
Ashland	3,811	53.88%	3,045	43.05%	106	1.50%	56	0.79%	55	0.78%	766	10.83%	7,073
Barron	7,343	67.71%	3,132	28.88%	91	0.84%	176	1.62%	102	0.94%	4,211	38.83%	10,844
Bayfield	3,411	69.74%	1,233	25.21%	73	1.49%	47	0.96%	127	2.60%	2,178	44.53%	4,891
Brown	10,965	44.10%	13,532	54.42%	225	0.90%	112	0.45%	30	0.12%	-2,567	-10.32%	24,864
Buffalo	2,923	63.96%	1,559	34.11%	25	0.55%	41	0.90%	22	0.48%	1,364	29.85%	4,570
Burnett	2,735	78.52%	641	18.40%	47	1.35%	26	0.75%	34	0.98%	2,094	60.12%	3,483
Calumet	2,087	33.76%	3,987	64.50%	54	0.87%	45	0.73%	8	0.13%	-1,900	-30.74%	6,181
Chippewa	7,690	59.23%	5,060	38.97%	57	0.44%	101	0.78%	76	0.59%	2,630	20.26%	12,984
Clark	6,903	65.37%	3,288	31.14%	176	1.67%	108	1.02%	85	0.80%	3,615	34.23%	10,560
Columbia	7,021	56.94%	5,144	41.72%	65	0.53%	80	0.65%	20	0.16%	1,877	15.22%	12,330
Crawford	3,288	51.17%	3,072	47.81%	12	0.19%	42	0.65%	12	0.19%	216	3.36%	6,426
Dane	19,477	45.18%	23,376	54.23%	89	0.21%	137	0.32%	28	0.06%	-3,899	-9.04%	43,107
Dodge	8,762	46.90%	9,496	50.83%	269	1.44%	106	0.57%	48	0.26%	-734	-3.93%	18,681
Door	3,774	65.88%	1,784	31.14%	32	0.56%	84	1.47%	55	0.96%	1,990	34.74%	5,729
Douglas	11,745	70.23%	4,435	26.52%	139	0.83%	89	0.53%	315	1.88%	7,310	43.71%	16,723
Dunn	6,770	77.95%	1,655	19.06%	48	0.55%	123	1.42%	89	1.02%	5,115	58.89%	8,685
Eau Claire	9,617	70.13%	3,824	27.88%	57	0.42%	101	0.74%	115	0.84%	5,793	42.24%	13,714
Florence	1,139	81.42%	223	15.94%	3	0.21%	8	0.57%	26	1.86%	916	65.48%	1,399
Fond du Lac	12,083	49.40%	11,944	48.83%	157	0.64%	223	0.91%	53	0.22%	139	0.57%	24,460
Forest	2,224	67.68%	974	29.64%	22	0.67%	33	1.00%	33	1.00%	1,250	38.04%	3,286
Grant	9,829	60.65%	6,185	38.16%	42	0.26%	113	0.70%	38	0.23%	3,644	22.48%	16,207
Green	4,791	60.28%	2,997	37.71%	27	0.34%	117	1.47%	16	0.20%	1,794	22.57%	7,948
Green Lake	2,895	51.20%	2,661	47.06%	36	0.64%	45	0.80%	17	0.30%	234	4.14%	5,654
Iowa	4,683	55.33%	3,654	43.17%	17	0.20%	102	1.21%	8	0.09%	1,029	12.16%	8,464
Iron	1,746	64.81%	790	29.32%	20	0.74%	19	0.71%	119	4.42%	956	35.49%	2,694
Jackson	3,880	71.72%	1,406	25.99%	28	0.52%	65	1.20%	31	0.57%	2,474	45.73%	5,410
Jefferson	7,335	49.41%	7,340	49.44%	77	0.52%	73	0.49%	21	0.14%	-5	-0.03%	14,846
Juneau	3,620	58.93%	2,433	39.61%	40	0.65%	39	0.63%	11	0.18%	1,187	19.32%	6,143
Kenosha	12,049	54.44%	9,474	42.80%	443	2.00%	71	0.32%	96	0.43%	2,575	11.63%	22,133
Kewaunee	1,906	36.19%	3,292	62.50%	20	0.38%	32	0.61%	17	0.32%	-1,386	-26.31%	5,267
La Crosse	11,471	58.27%	8,101	41.15%	37	0.19%	63	0.32%	13	0.07%	3,370	17.12%	19,685
Lafayette	4,631	53.97%	3,867	45.07%	11	0.13%	54	0.63%	17	0.20%	764	8.90%	8,580
Langlade	4,048	52.98%	3,470	45.41%	41	0.54%	74	0.97%	8	0.10%	578	7.56%	7,641
Lincoln	4,044	56.86%	2,929	41.18%	50	0.70%	62	0.87%	27	0.38%	1,115	15.68%	7,112
Manitowoc	6,746	37.32%	10,900	60.30%	279	1.54%	106	0.59%	45	0.25%	-4,154	-22.98%	18,076
Marathon	10,279	49.60%	10,052	48.51%	223	1.08%	133	0.64%	36	0.17%	227	1.10%	20,723
Marinette	7,134	64.06%	3,739	33.58%	186	1.67%	61	0.55%	16	0.14%	3,395	30.49%	11,136
Marquette	2,168	58.90%	1,439	39.09%	20	0.54%	53	1.44%	1	0.03%	729	19.80%	3,681
Milwaukee	91,381	44.48%	82,833	40.32%	30,064	14.63%	666	0.32%	511	0.25%	8,548	4.16%	205,455
Monroe	5,488	60.02%	3,458	37.82%	54	0.59%	137	1.50%	7	0.08%	2,030	22.20%	9,144
Oconto	4,944	56.69%	3,647	41.82%	45	0.52%	67	0.77%	18	0.21%	1,297	14.87%	8,721
Oneida	3,348	62.54%	1,846	34.49%	91	1.70%	45	0.84%	23	0.43%	1,502	28.06%	5,353
Outagamie	12,763	52.10%	11,491	46.91%	115	0.47%	98	0.40%	28	0.11%	1,272	5.19%	24,495
Ozaukee	2,224	36.60%	3,736	61.49%	88	1.45%	24	0.39%	4	0.07%	-1,512	-24.88%	6,076
Pepin	2,020	68.24%	875	29.56%	21	0.71%	24	0.81%	20	0.68%	1,145	38.68%	2,960
Pierce	6,471	74.61%	1,986	22.90%	56	0.65%	89	1.03%	71	0.82%	4,485	51.71%	8,673
Polk	6,621	77.22%	1,709	19.93%	70	0.82%	104	1.21%	70	0.82%	4,912	57.29%	8,574
Portage	5,176	44.21%	6,422	54.85%	49	0.42%	44	0.38%	18	0.15%	-1,246	-10.64%	11,709
Price	3,421	64.72%	1,689	31.95%	51	0.96%	53	1.00%	72	1.36%	1,732	32.77%	5,286
Racine	20,111	68.96%	8,356	28.65%	363	1.24%	174	0.60%	158	0.54%	11,755	40.31%	29,162
Richland	5,248	68.40%	2,298	29.95%	21	0.27%	86	1.12%	19	0.25%	2,950	38.45%	7,672
Rock	20,536	69.14%	8,822	29.70%	86	0.29%	232	0.78%	24	0.08%	11,714	39.44%	29,700
Rusk	3,436	70.14%	1,191	24.31%	95	1.94%	100	2.04%	77	1.57%	2,245	45.83%	4,899
Sauk	6,834	54.96%	5,407	43.48%	36	0.29%	130	1.05%	28	0.23%	1,427	11.48%	12,435
Sawyer	2,068	72.18%	734	25.62%	28	0.98%	27	0.94%	8	0.28%	1,334	46.56%	2,865
Shawano	5,283	59.75%	3,343	37.81%	76	0.86%	95	1.07%	45	0.51%	1,940	21.94%	8,842
Sheboygan	14,586	58.43%	9,492	38.02%	702	2.81%	135	0.54%	49	0.20%	5,094	20.41%	24,964
St. Croix	6,578	62.48%	3,789	35.99%	59	0.56%	82	0.78%	20	0.19%	2,789	26.49%	10,528
Taylor	2,847	60.81%	1,614	34.47%	123	2.63%	61	1.30%	37	0.79%	1,233	26.33%	4,682
Trempealeau	5,079	62.54%	2,950	36.33%	17	0.21%	49	0.60%	26	0.32%	2,129	26.22%	8,121
Vernon	6,042	67.09%	2,847	31.61%	13	0.14%	92	1.02%	12	0.13%	3,195	35.48%	9,006
Vilas	1,836	73.32%	551	22.00%	52	2.08%	16	0.64%	49	1.96%	1,285	51.32%	2,504
Walworth	9,996	72.10%	3,666	26.44%	44	0.32%	135	0.97%	23	0.17%	6,330	45.66%	13,864
Washburn	2,746	71.47%	897	23.35%	105	2.73%	54	1.41%	40	1.04%	1,849	48.13%	3,842
Washington	4,437	45.16%	5,158	52.50%	182	1.85%	32	0.33%	16	0.16%	-721	-7.34%	9,825
Waukesha	12,767	64.06%	6,649	33.36%	382	1.92%	107	0.54%	25	0.13%	6,118	30.70%	19,930
Waupaca	8,069	68.17%	3,394	28.68%	124	1.05%	126	1.06%	123	1.04%	4,675	39.50%	11,836
Waushara	3,553	69.07%	1,488	28.93%	30	0.58%	38	0.74%	35	0.68%	2,065	40.14%	5,144
Winnebago	16,351	61.80%	9,736	36.80%	170	0.64%	179	0.68%	21	0.08%	6,615	25.00%	26,457
Wood	7,037	55.66%	5,258	41.59%	146	1.15%	124	0.98%	78	0.62%	1,779	14.07%	12,643
Total	547,738	55.38%	394,368	39.87%	36,924	3.73%	6,477	0.65%	3,636	0.37%	153,370	15.51%	989,143

==== Counties that flipped from Republican to Democratic ====
- Brown
- Calumet
- Dane
- Dodge
- Jefferson
- Kewaunee
- Manitowoc
- Portage
- Washington

== Bibliography ==
- Gubernatorial Elections, 1787-1997. Washington, D.C.: Congressional Quarterly Inc. 1998. ISBN 1-56802-396-0.
- Anderson, William J.; Anderson, William A., eds. (1929). The Wisconsin Blue Book, 1929. Madison, Wisconsin: Democrat Printing Company, State Printer.
