= Frank Metcalfe =

American politician

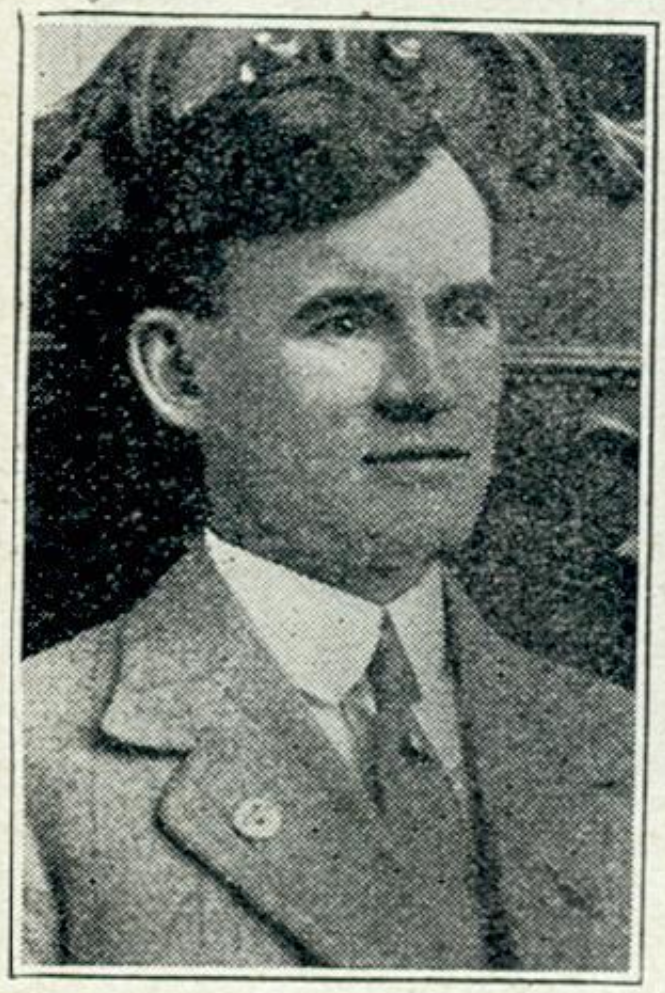
Metcalfe's official State Assembly portrait, 1917

Frank B. Metcalfe (December 26, 1874 – January 4, 1946) was a glassblower from Milwaukee, Wisconsin who spent four terms as a Socialist member of the Wisconsin State Assembly and was twice the Socialist nominee for Governor of Wisconsin.

== Background ==
Metcalfe was born in Streator, Illinois on December 26, 1874. He attended public school until dropping out at the age of thirteen to work as a "helper boy" and later "glass gatherer" for a local bottle factory. He became an apprentice glass bottle blower in Alton, Illinois. After living in Indiana and Missouri, he came to Milwaukee in 1905, to enter the employ of the Northern Glass Works, where he was working when elected to the Assembly. He was active in the union movement and served one year as an executive board member of the Wisconsin State Federation of Labor.

== Legislative service ==
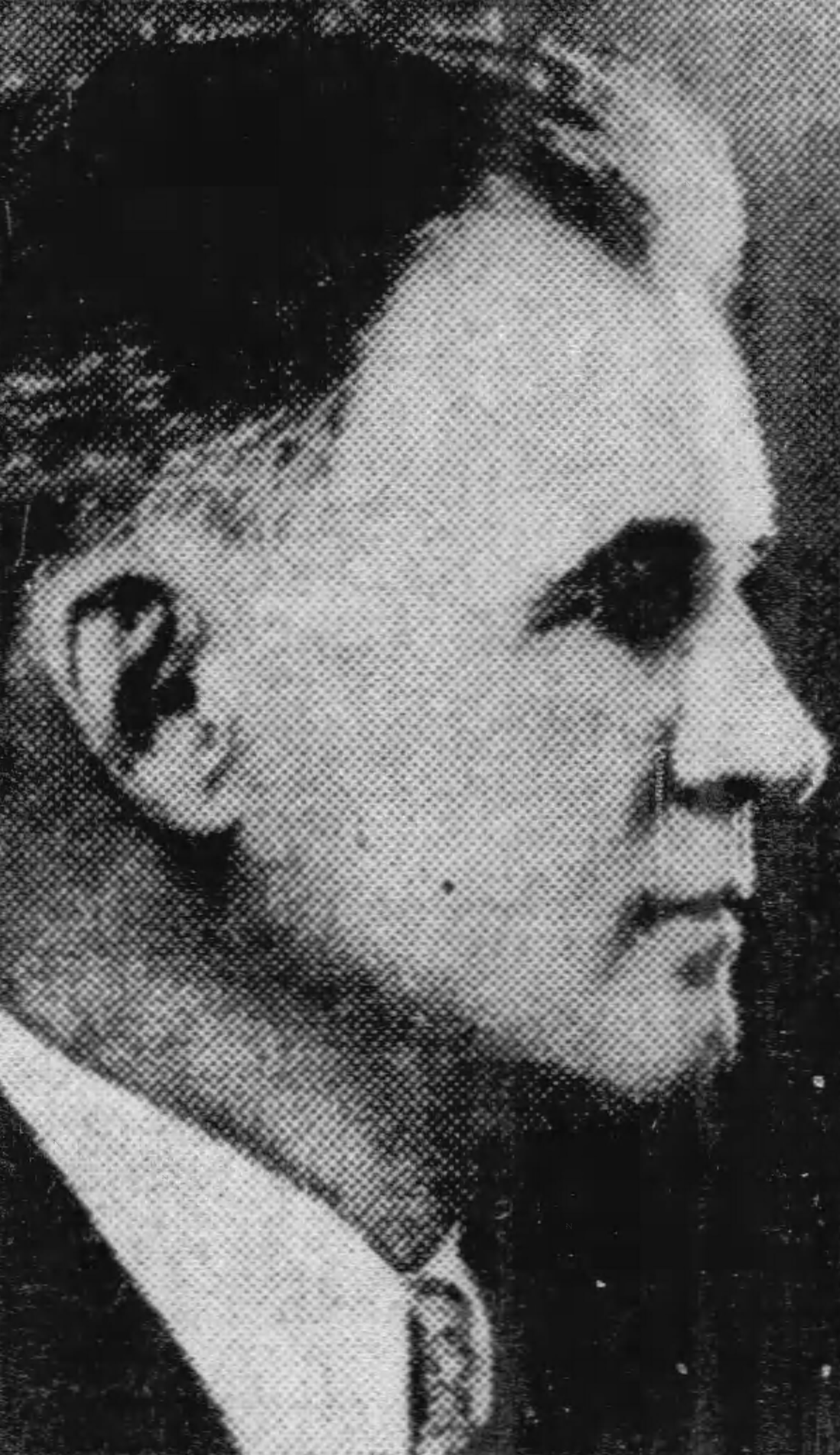
Metcalfe later in life

Metcalfe was first elected in 1910 to represent Milwaukee County's Third Assembly district (the 17th Ward of the City of Milwaukee, the towns of Oak Creek and Lake, the village of Cudahy, and the city of South Milwaukee), with 2,013 votes against 1,598 for Progressive Republican Henry Disch and 1,199 for Democrat Luke Scanlan (the seat had previously been held by William Disch, also a Republican). He was assigned to the standing committees on welfare of women and children, and on public health and sanitation. The district was modified for the 1912 election (losing Oak Creek, and South Milwaukee) and renumbered as the 17th. In the new district, Metcalfe was unseated by John Paulu (a Democrat) by a 12-vote margin in a four-way race.
