= Ralph Immell =

20th century American military officer

Ralph M. Immell
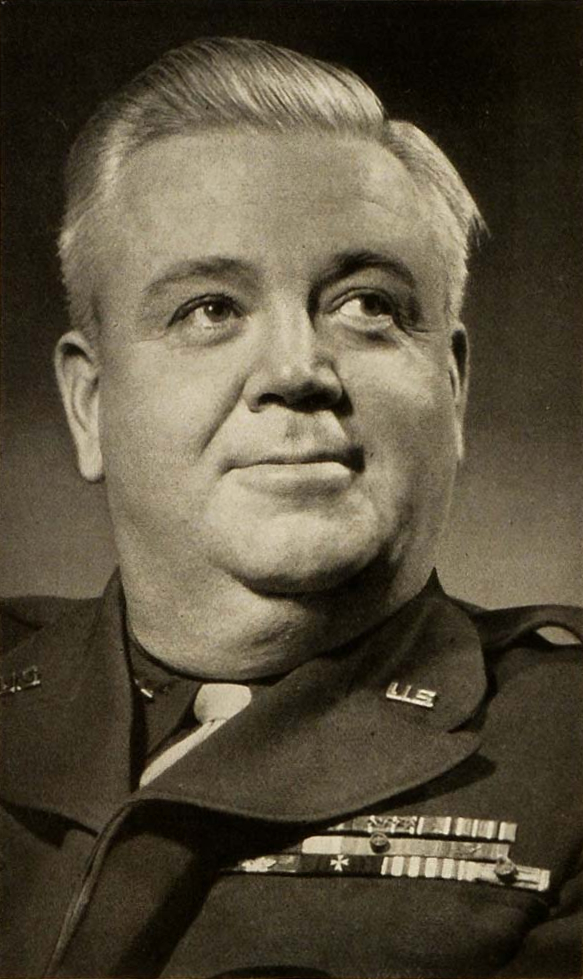
- Immell c. 1945

22nd Adjutant General of Wisconsin
- In office June 1, 1923 – May 11, 1946
- Governor: John J. Blaine; Fred R. Zimmerman; Walter J. Kohler Sr. Philip La Follette; Albert G. Schmedeman; Philip La Follette; Julius P. Heil; Walter Samuel Goodland
- Preceded by: John G. Salsman
- Succeeded by: Alvin A. Kuechenmeister

Personal details
- Born: September 11, 1894 Blair, Wisconsin, U.S.
- Died: August 29, 1969 (aged 74) Middleton, Wisconsin, U.S.
- Resting place: Zion Lutheran Cemetery, Blair, Wisconsin
- Party: Republican; Progressive (1934–1946); National Progressives (1938–1946)
- Spouses: Hazel Marie Gray (m. 1922; died 1962); Mary Alice (O'Neill) Dean (m. 1964–1969)
- Children: 2
- Education: La Crosse State Teachers College; University of Wyoming; University of Wisconsin Law School

Military service
- Allegiance: United States
- Branch/service: Wisconsin National Guard; United States Army
- Years of service: 1917–1919 (USA); 1919–1942 (ARNG); 1942–1946 (USA); 1946–1954 (USAR)
- Rank: Major General, USA
- Unit: 121st M.G. Bn., 32nd Div. U.S. Infantry; 101st Reg., 26th Div. U.S. Infantry; 53rd Cavalry Brigade, 22nd Div. U.S. Cavalry; U.S. Fifth Army; Sixth Army Group
- Commands: 84th Div. U.S. Infantry
- Battles/wars: World War I; Battle of Seicheprey; Second Battle of the Marne; Meuse–Argonne offensive; World War II; Operation Torch; Tunisian campaign; Italian campaign; Operation Dragoon; Invasion of Germany
- Awards: Order of Ouissam Alaouite; Sovereign Military Order of Malta; Order of the Crown of Italy; Legion of Honour; Croix de Guerre 1939–1945; Legion of Merit; Distinguished Service Medal

Ralph Maxwell Immell (September 11, 1894 – August 29, 1969) was an American lawyer, military officer, and progressive politician from Trempealeau County, Wisconsin. He served as adjutant general of Wisconsin for 23 years, from 1923 to 1946, and served as a United States Army general in World War II, managing American and Allied logistics in the North African and European theaters.

Throughout his career, he was actively involved in supporting the progressive movement in Wisconsin and was a close ally of Philip La Follette during the era of the Wisconsin Progressive Party. He worked as an assistant district attorney under Theodore G. Lewis, and served as executive secretary to Wisconsin governor John J. Blaine before Blaine appointed him adjutant general. While serving as adjutant general, Immell also served seven years on the Wisconsin Conservation Commission (1931–1938), including three years as chairman, creating a conservation jobs program which became a forerunner for Roosevelt's Civilian Conservation Corps.

In 1938, he was executive director of the National Progressives of America, a short-lived attempt to nationalize the progressive movement as a third party. After the progressive party collapsed, he ran as a progressive candidate for the Republican Party gubernatorial nomination in 1946 and 1948, but lost both primaries to conservative Republican candidates. Later in life, he was president of Radio Wisconsin Inc. and was instrumental in securing their television broadcast license and establishing WISC-TV.

== Early life and education ==
Ralph Immell was born in Blair, Wisconsin, in Trempealeau County, September 1894. He was raised and educated in that area, graduating from Blair high school in 1911. He went on to attend La Crosse State Teachers College (now University of Wisconsin–La Crosse) and earned his teaching certificate in 1915. He taught school for a year, then enrolled in the University of Wyoming in 1916. In Wyoming, he worked as a cattle puncher during the summers and attended the university in the winters; he earned his bachelor's degree there in 1918.

== World War I service ==
While attending the University of Wyoming, Immell enlisted in the Reserve Officers' Training Corps after the United States entered World War I, and was commissioned a second lieutenant. After his graduation, he deployed to France with the 26th U.S. Infantry Division. Immell ultimately served 20 months in France, participating in the Battle of Seicheprey, the Second Battle of the Marne, and the Meuse–Argonne offensive.

His service continued after the armistice, as he became a machine gun instructor; he was then promoted to first lieutenant and worked briefly as an instructor on field tactics.

== Early political career ==
After returning from the war, Immell attended the University of Wisconsin Law School, graduating in 1921. He became increasingly active in politics, supporting the progressive Republican faction of Robert M. "Fighting Bob" La Follette. While in law school, he had been hired as an assistant to the district attorney of Dane County, Wisconsin, Theodore G. Lewis.

He was appointed executive clerk to governor John J. Blaine in January 1922, and was quickly promoted to executive secretary, which was at the time the top appointed job in the governor's personal office. During 1922, Immell also volunteered throughout the state working for La Follette's U.S. Senate re-election campaign.

== Adjutant general ==
=== Initial service under Blaine ===
Following the February 1923 death of adjutant general Orlando Holway, Blaine shocked the state political apparatus by appointing the 28-year-old Immell as Holway's successor. In some newspapers, the appointment was mocked and derided; opponents referred to Immell as the "Boy General", and pointed out he had little experience with the Wisconsin National Guard and almost no experience with command.

Immell took office at a time when the Wisconsin Legislature was keen to slash the National Guard budget; under those cuts, Immell oversaw a reorganization of the Wisconsin Guard. To supplement state funding, Immell aggressively sought reimbursement from the federal government for state guard materiel that had been nationalized for the war effort during World War I. In his second year as adjutant general, he began a bi-monthly magazine for all guard members, called the Wisconsin National Guard Review. That same year, he was officially conferred the rank of brigadier general by the United States Department of War. In December 1924, Immell provoked statewide controversy by predicting another world war within five years.

=== Retaining office under Zimmerman ===
After the 1926 elections, it was rumored that Immell would resign as adjutant general to serve as private secretary to John J. Blaine, who had just been elected U.S. senator. Other rumors suggested he would be appointed deputy attorney general under John W. Reynolds Sr. Immell denied the rumors, however, and attempted to continue as adjutant general under the new governor Fred R. Zimmerman. Zimmerman was also a Republican, but had won the Republican nomination as a compromise candidate between progressives and stalwarts; he sought to remove Immell from office early in 1927, inquiring into whether his initial appointment had been legally valid. During the controversy, Immell received a strong vote of support from the regimental commanders in the Guard, who described him as one of the best leaders the Wisconsin Guard had had up to that point. Ultimately Zimmerman dropped his attempts to remove Immell, after the state attorney general gave an opinion unfavorable to his removal rationale.

After an inspection of Wisconsin National Guard units in 1927, assistant secretary of war Hanford MacNider declared that it was the finest guard organization in the country. By his recommendation, Immell was admitted to a 40-day course at the United States Army War College on organization and logistics. Immell would later say that it was here that he first met Dwight D. Eisenhower. At the end of the year, Immell was designated as a representative of the Sixth Corps Area to a committee to streamline Guard regulations and training to more easily nationalize Guard units in times of war. The following year, he attended another course on military intelligence.

In the Summer of 1928, Immell was badly injured in an automobile hit-and-run near his home in Maple Bluff, Wisconsin. He suffered a fractured skull, a broken collar bone, two broken ribs, and severe bruising, coming close to death. He was hospitalized for nearly two weeks. He returned to his normal duties later that year.

=== Additional duties under Phil La Follette ===
In October 1929, Immell was elected president of the Sixth Corps in the National Guard Association of the United States. Two years later, he was elected president of the National Adjutants General Association. Under new progressive governor Philip La Follette in 1931, Immell was again rumored to be appointed to another post (this time state insurance commissioner), but he remained adjutant general through another gubernatorial term. He was, however, also appointed to serve on the state Conservation Commission. As part of his service on the Conservation Commission, he was granted broad executive authority to reorganize the department to decentralize functions to several regional conservation officers. Immell also took charge of a new forest fire prevention and reforestation program. The forestry program was also intended to work as a jobs program to fight the unemployment crisis in the midst of the Great Depression; it served as a state-level forerunner of the federal Civilian Conservation Corps that would be implemented under the Roosevelt administration. At the time, the program was described as the most extensive reforestation program ever attempted by a state government. This program, however, also took criticism for paying significant salaries to progressive allies of Governor La Follette and bypassing civil service hiring rules. Shortly after Roosevelt's inauguration, Immell traveled to Washington with new governor Albert G. Schmedeman to make a case for a federal loan to support the state's finances; for his part, Immell gave a presentation on the work of the state reforestation program to the United States Forest Service and to Roosevelt himself.

=== Schmedeman and the Milk Strikes ===
Although closely identified with the prior progressive administration, Immell ingratiated himself with the new Democratic governor, Schmedeman, in 1933. From his post as adjutant general, Immell took charge of managing the divisive and politically sensitive issue of the depression-driven milk strikes. In the lead up to the violence, Immell offered to send in 2,500 members of the National Guard, and to supply them with tear gas. The most severe hotspots were in the Fox River valley and northeast, where Immell dispatched a battalion of guardsmen to patrol strike zones with rifles and fixed bayonets. Immell had several sharp personal exchanges with Milk Pool president Walter Singler, a leader of the strike movement, over who was to blame for strike violence. For their part, milk pool organizers accused Immell of provoking the violence with the use of militia, calling him a "military dictator". Politically, Immell and the strike response became a cudgel that some progressives used to damage the Democratic governor, Schmedeman, among farm and labor ranks. Although La Follette was said to disapprove of the effort, progressives in the Legislature pushed for an investigation of Immell's conduct, and only relented after Schmedeman took personal responsibility for ordering Immell to deploy the National Guard. Schmedeman gave another vote of confidence to Immell that summer, when he reappointed him to the state Conservation Commission. Later that year, he became acting director of the Conservation Department due to the resignation of the previous director, and then became chairman of the Conservation Commission.

=== Gubernatorial speculation, Progressive Party, and W.P.A. ===
Despite the milk strike controversy, Immell had earned significant public affection; he was a prolific public speaker at nonpartisan patriotic gatherings throughout the state, and had developed a reputation for diligence, competence, and economy for his efforts reorganizing the National Guard, managing state emergencies, and developing state conservation (employment) programs. Early in 1934, newspapers began to speculate about Immell making a run for governor of Wisconsin as a Republican compromise candidate between progressive and stalwart factions. Immell's gubernatorial chances in 1934 effectively evaporated when the Wisconsin Progressive Party formally voted to split from the Republicans, ending the possibility of a compromise nomination. Nevertheless, Immell's supporters represented a significant bloc of progressive Republican voters, and wooing Immell into their faction was described as an existential necessity for the new Progressive Party. Immell decided to join the progressives, and Philip La Follette ultimately went on to win the 1934 gubernatorial election, running on the Progressive ticket.

Also in 1934, Immell received a commission from President Franklin Roosevelt as a brigadier general in the United States Army Adjutant General's Corps. In the fall, Immell's former patron John J. Blaine died. After his death, a movement was made among progressive allies to see Immell appointed to Blaine's seat on the Reconstruction Finance Corporation, but he ultimately did not received the appointment. The next year, however, he did receive a federal appointment as Wisconsin director of the Works Progress Administration. His appointment had been recommended by La Follette. This appointment was another indicator of his clout among Wisconsin progressives and was seen as an olive branch from Roosevelt to La Follette's supporters, as Roosevelt's projects had struggled to gain approval in the Wisconsin Legislature; the appointment also incensed Wisconsin Democrats who had expected the job to go to the former governor, Schmedeman, or another Wisconsin Democrat. Democrats further alleged that La Follette was conspiring to sabotage the program and that Immell would use the federal money as a slush fund to give salaries to progressive allies; Wisconsin labor unions also attacked the appointment, worried that Immell would be unfriendly to their interests. Shortly after accepting the appointment, he resigned from the state Conservation Commission and also requested a leave of absence from his role as adjutant general to focus on his W.P.A. responsibilities.

Within two months of his appointment, Immell and La Follette had received federal approval for over $16,000,000 in W.P.A. projects, initially supporting 25,000 Wisconsin jobs. By mid-November, more than 55,000 Wisconsin jobs had been created by W.P.A. projects. Immell also reported at that time that 96.8% of those employed by W.P.A. were previously receiving emergency unemployment assistance. Wisconsin Democrats, however, continued their attacks against Immell, and pursued legislative investigations into his management of the W.P.A. Wisconsin's Democratic U.S. senator F. Ryan Duffy also joined in the attacks, calling for a federal investigation of Immell's administration. The regional W.P.A. office in Illinois ultimately performed an evaluation of Immell and the Wisconsin W.P.A. and determined that his administration was free of nepotism and political favoritism.

Immell resigned from the W.P.A. role in February 1936, stating in his resignation letter that he considered his duty completed by organizing and standing up the W.P.A. in Wisconsin, but pointed out that he believed that the program could have benefited from more input at the federal level from La Follette, who had in the past criticized the W.P.A for being insufficient compared to his own failed plan, the Wisconsin Works Bill. Immell's resignation immediately touched off new speculation about whether he would seek another office. Two months later, he also informed the National Adjutants General Association that he would not accept another term as president of that organization. Although he had resigned from the state Conservation Commission the previous year, he had continued in an acting role pending the selection of a replacement; after his resignation from the W.P.A., La Follette reappointed him to the Conservation Commission, succeeding himself until his final resignation in March 1938.

After La Follette was re-elected as governor in 1936, speculation began that La Follette would run for U.S. Senate in 1938 and that Immell would run to succeed him as governor. Vocal factions for and against the Immell candidacy quickly announced themselves in progressive newspapers, debating the issue for most of 1937 and into 1938; one of the leading opponents of the Immell candidacy was William T. Evjue, the influential editor of The Capital Times. Responding to the agitation, La Follette indicated he would run for re-election as governor, and Immell's supporters began pushing for Immell as a candidate for U.S. Senate instead. Ultimately it was revealed that La Follette had been attempting to build a national progressive party and had not planned to run for office in 1938 in order to focus on building this third party; he had been responsible for much of the support for Immell's candidacy, but could not control the rebellion from inside his party. Immell faced strong opposition from progressive farmer and labor groups, who stated that they "could not forget" his role in the 1933 milk strikes. La Follette was ultimately compelled to tell a private group of Progressive Party leaders that he would not push for an Immell nomination for Senate, and Immell did not enter either race.

Although his plans were changed, La Follette continued his effort to turn the Wisconsin Progressive Party into a new national party. Since Immell had been unable to run for either elected office in 1938, La Follette appointed him to head the new "National Progressives of America". The Progressive Party went on to lose both 1938 Wisconsin elections, effectively dooming the project.

=== Heil administration and the start of World War II ===
After the progressive defeat in the 1938 elections, the incoming Republican governor, Julius P. Heil, asked Immell to refrain from political activity if he intended to retain the office of adjutant general. Immell complied and resigned as executive director of La Follette's National Progressives. In January 1939, Immell was commissioned as a brigadier general in the National Guard of the United States by President Roosevelt.

In 1937, Immell had attended the dedication of the Meuse-Argonne American Memorial in France at the invitation of General John J. Pershing. While in Europe, he also spent time studying European tanks and mechanized military equipment, and conversing with several European military counterparts. His discussions led him to the conclusion that the risk of war was receding in Europe because the Spanish Civil War had not resulted in a quick and decisive victory for either side, demonstrating roughly equal advances in offensive and defensive weaponry and tactics. As Germany began agitating for the annexation of Austria and the Sudetenland in 1938, Immell modified his stance, suggesting open warfare was still at least a year away; he suggested that the United States should remain out of the fighting, but advocated for massive investment in Naval and Air power to deter potential attackers. By April 1939, Immell had begun warning audiences at his frequent public speaking sessions that another European war was now inevitable, and would likely be disastrous and protracted. However, he still believed that America could stay out of the war, serve as an example in cleaning up its own economic situation, and step in to assist in the aftermath.

He also frequently reiterated his recommendation to invest in the United States naval and air forces to deter attacks in the western hemisphere. National Guard activity ramped up considerably after the invasion of Poland in September, as Roosevelt authorized additional recruiting and funding. As France fell, Immell made frequent trips to Washington, D.C., to update plans for the possibility that the United States could be dragged into the war; Wisconsin outfitted and trained their Guard on new mechanized equipment, planned processes for rapid mobilization, and prepared for induction of conscripts. Wisconsin also began planning a second reserve, referred to as a Home Guard, which would stand up to defend industrial areas in Wisconsin in the event that the Guard were deployed overseas. Also, after years of advocating for an air squadron in Wisconsin, Immell's calls were answered in July 1940 when the Wisconsin National Guard was allotted its first air unit, the 126th Air Observation Squadron.

Immell continued to advocate a defensive posture in America, which brought him into direct conflict with Evjue and The Capital Times again. Evjue was a strident advocate for early American intervention in Europe. Many in the Wisconsin news media continued to speculate that Immell would run for Governor in 1940, but he made no effort in politics during these years—even to endorse another candidate.

In October 1940, Wisconsin's first Guard units were activated for federal service, to participate in one year of training and preparedness drills following an order from President Roosevelt. Immell's speeches in the state began to turn toward a focus on logistical issues of agriculture and industry for feeding and supplying American forces if they are called into war. He also began advocating for massive U.S. aide shipments to Britain and Greece, who were then some of the last holdouts against the Axis in continental Europe. At the end of the year, Immell was commissioned a brigadier general in the regular U.S. Army, by President Roosevelt.

After their year on active duty, Wisconsin's Guard units began returning home shortly before the attack on Pearl Harbor on December 7, 1941. On the day of the attack, Immell was preparing to travel to Louisiana to visit Wisconsin Guard units of the 32nd Infantry Division still training. Following the declaration of war against Japan, Immell and Governor Heil announced that all state personnel and facilities were prepared to serve the war effort; Immell sent word to Wisconsin local officials and law enforcement to be on guard for sabotage and espionage operations at critical infrastructure. Their visit to Louisiana went on as planned. Shortly after their return, Heil announced that Immell would act as coordinator for all military cooperation between the state and federal government.

== World War II service ==
Through much of 1942, Immell continued the effort of organizing Wisconsin's home guard units, coordinating additional military training, facilities, and logistical duties with the federal government, and advising the governor on military affairs. Immell, however, was intent on active duty in the war; he had begun pursuing an active duty appointment shortly after Pearl Harbor, and had publicly lamented being left behind in Wisconsin while his National Guard "family" was deployed or was preparing to deploy overseas. In October 1942, Immell was finally accepted to active duty in the United States Army, and took a leave of absence from his role as adjutant general. He had to accept demotion to the rank of colonel for his initial role, but was immediately deployed to Morocco, attached to the headquarters of supply for the American forces supporting Operation Torch—the Allied invasion of North Africa. After Allied forces took control of the region, Immell became a military administrator in Morocco for several months, overseeing logistics, engineers, and hospitals, and coordinating with the Moroccan and French government. For his service, Immell was made a member of the honorific Order of Ouissam Alaouite by Sultan Mohammed V.

After Morocco, Immell followed the Allied advance through Tunisia before being ordered to take command of the Allied-occupied Algiers region. This assignment came with challenging cleanup and policing responsibilities in the critical port city, and additional political and diplomatic duties. Immell's talent for storytelling served him well, and he was well-liked by local Muslim leaders, French administrators, and Allied officers. He was present at Oran at the arrival of President Roosevelt, Winston Churchill, and General George C. Marshall. In late 1943, Immell was promoted back to the rank of brigadier general and ordered to Naples to serve as military commandant for the Naples metropolitan region. Immell served the first half of 1944 in command at Naples, and was honored as a grand officer in the Order of the Crown of Italy by the Italian Crown Prince, Umberto, largely in recognition for his work stopping a Typhus epidemic and restoring civil order; earlier in 1944, he was honored as a cavalier magistrate in the Sovereign Military Order of Malta, and received an honorary degree of doctor of laws from the University of Naples Federico II.

Through his administrative work in North Africa and Italy, Immell earned a reputation as a tactful problem-solver. On July 1, 1944, Immell was made deputy commander of the logistical operations for the Sixth United States Army Group, preparing for Operation Dragoon—the Allied invasion of southern France. For his role in the liberation of France, the French government awarded him the Legion of Honour and the Croix de Guerre.

He was granted a 30-day furlough to return to Wisconsin at the end of 1944, and was awarded the U.S. Legion of Merit for his service in North Africa and Italy; the citation commended Immell for his diplomatic finesse with the African and French administrators in North Africa, and recognized him for establishing and managing the largest supply depot in the North Africa campaign; they further thanked him for his work in Italy, reducing the spread of venereal disease among U.S. military personnel, and recovering hundreds of stolen American government vehicles.

Immell spent the first half of 1945 back in Europe, supporting the advance into Germany. In June, he was sent back for another brief visit to the United States and met with the new president, Harry Truman, during his visit. During this summer, the Wisconsin political press again began speculating about Immell's future as a candidate for governor. Before he could return to Europe, Immell was given a new assignment, to remain in Washington, D.C., and work on plans for post-war training and maintenance of the American armed forces as part of a committee reporting to Army Chief of Staff George C. Marshall. In September, President Truman nominated Immell for promotion to the rank of major general at the recommendation of General Thomas B. Larkin. The Senate confirmed his promotion later that month.

Immell received the Army Distinguished Service Medal and retired from active duty in November 1945, reverting to his rank of brigadier general in the National Guard. In receiving the medal, he was recognized for his logistical accomplishments in the liberation of France and Germany, arranging the equipping and arming of the French Forces of the Interior when the liberation began, having the foresight to restart lumber and coal production from captured German territory in the Saarland, and his efficient management of the complex rail, bridge, and road supply network.

== Gubernatorial campaigns ==
With Immell's retirement from active duty, speculation intensified that he would run for governor in 1946. The Wisconsin Progressive Party was then in significant decline, and both Progressive and Republican leadership had made moves in recent years toward rebuilding their former coalition. Immell hoped to run for governor as a Republican with progressive support, taking the model that had worked for incumbent governor Walter Samuel Goodland in the 1944 election. Goodland and Immell had several discussions, and some in the Wisconsin political press believed that Goodland, then 83 years old, was soliciting Immell to step in as his successor. That plan fell apart in March 1946 when Goodland instead announced that he would run for a third term as governor. That same month, the Wisconsin Progressive Party voted to disband and rejoin the Republican Party, largely to support the re-election chances of progressive U.S. senator Robert M. La Follette Jr., who would likely benefit from an explicit alliance with the popular Goodland. The progressive leadership urged Immell to run instead for lieutenant governor.

At the Republican state convention in May, however, another twist occurred as Republican delegates declined to endorse Goodland's re-election, instead supporting conservative West Bend businessman Delbert J. Kenny. Within days, Immell decided that the time was right for him to run for governor; he formally entered the Republican Party gubernatorial primary and retired as adjutant general of Wisconsin a few days later. With the floodgates opened, two previous 1944 candidates also entered the gubernatorial race: progressive Ralph F. Amoth and stalwart Otto R. Werkmeister.

The campaign was initially cordial between Immell and Goodland, with Goodland even commenting that he thought Immell would make a good governor, but things turned bitter between the two as the third significant primary candidate, Kenny, quickly faded into obscurity. As a first time candidate, Immell struggled early in the campaign to adjust to political speechmaking, but he hired experienced advisors and ultimately ran a strong campaign, consolidating much of the progressive voter base. He also benefited from the fact that the 83-year-old Goodland was unable to campaign extensively on the road. With Delbert Kenny failing to capture any popular support, however, conservative Republicans began rallying to Goodland as the only vehicle to stop the progressives from recapturing the governor's office. The progressive voter base that Immell was relying on was also significantly diminished from past elections—while the Progressive Party leadership had voted to rejoin the Republican Party, that sentiment was hardly unanimous among progressive voters, and many ultimately joined the Democrats instead, removing themselves from the Republican primary electorate. In the end Goodland prevailed by 3.4% of the vote and went on to win re-election. Additionally, Goodland had decided to endorse La Follette's opponent in the Senate primary, Joseph McCarthy. Some Wisconsin newspapers speculated that Immell's campaign also ultimately doomed Robert La Follette Jr.'s re-election chances, as conservatives who may have been inclined to support him were alienated by his close support for Immell; La Follette lost his election by just 2,000 votes.

Goodland died two months into his third term and was succeeded by his lieutenant governor, Oscar Rennebohm. Immell was widely expected to run for governor again in 1948, but after his election primary loss he had returned to his military career. In March 1947, he was appointed commander of the famous 101st Airborne Division, which at that time was a reserve unit. This was likely a short term honorific post, as Immell continued working in Madison and speaking around Wisconsin during this time. After just a few months, Immell was transferred to command the 84th Airborne Division, also in reserve status. Just after the 1948 Czechoslovak coup d'état, Immell gathered the officers of the 84th Division and instructed them to prepare themselves for the possibility of another war.

In early 1948, Immell also began working publicly for the presidential campaign of General Douglas MacArthur as a national campaign coordinator. MacArthur hoped to win the Wisconsin presidential primary in April, and was supported by much of the remaining La Follette apparatus in the state. The primary became another proxy battle between progressive and conservative factions in Wisconsin, as conservative U.S. senator Joseph McCarthy endorsed MacArthur's opponent, Minnesota U.S. senator Harold Stassen. Stassen's victory was yet another indicator of the waning power of the progressive faction in the state.

Ultimately, despite the setback for the progressives in the Spring election, Immell did launch another campaign for governor in 1948. In the Republican primary, he got a head-to-head matchup against the incumbent, Rennebohm. He improved his vote share and raw vote total from 1946, but still fell far short of Rennebohm, who received 58% of the vote.

Rennebohm did not run for re-election in 1950, and a movement was made again among Immell's supporters to convince him to make another run, but he forcefully declined.

== Later years ==
Immell never ran for office again and scaled back his public speaking, but remained somewhat active in politics. He was a strong supporter of Dwight D. Eisenhower, who he described as a personal friend, and was present with Eisenhower in Paris when he announced the he would run for president. Immell and other former progressives ran as a slate to serve as convention delegates in the Spring of 1952, but Robert A. Taft won the state's presidential preference vote. Nevertheless, Immell attended the 1952 Republican National Convention as a non-delegate, to help secure Eisenhower's nomination. After Eisenhower's victory in the 1952 general election, Wisconsin newspapers speculated that Immell was likely to get a senior defense or judicial appointment in the Eisenhower administration. Although his rank of major general was reaffirmed early in Eisenhower's first term, he received no other federal appointment.

He continued serving as an officer in the Army Reserve, commanding the 84th Division until his retirement in September 1954.

During these years, Immell also became increasingly involved in private enterprise. He entered the mass media business in 1953, becoming president of Radio Wisconsin Inc., which was involved in a regulatory fight at the Federal Communications Commission to become one of Wisconsin's first television carriers. Immell's bid ultimately won the television license and became what is now WISC-TV, beating out a competing bid from "Badger Television Inc.", led by Immell's old media antagonist, William T. Evjue. Immell also became counsel to North Central Airlines, and a member of the board of Big Brothers of America.

== Personal life and family ==
Ralph Immell was the youngest of four sons born to Elmer Lorenzo and Roseann (née McKivergin) Immell. Elmer Immell was sheriff of Trempealeau County and, in his time, was one of the most prominent progressives of western Wisconsin. Two of Ralph Immell's elder brothers, Russell Harrison Immell and Clinton B. Immell, also served in the U.S. Army during World War I; Clinton Immell also served several years as sheriff of Trempealeau County.

On September 25, 1922, Ralph Immell eloped with Hazel Marie Gray, of Madison, to be married in Rockford, Illinois. They had two children and were married for nearly 40 years before Hazel's death from a heart attack in 1962. Hazel earned a doctorate and worked as a researcher at the Mayo Clinic; she also organized a nonprofit which led to the creation of the University of Wisconsin Hearing Center. During World War II, she led the Wisconsin blood drive for the American Red Cross. After Hazel's death, Immell married Mary Alice Dean (née O'Neill), the widow of Dr. Joseph C. Dean, in February 1964.

After a series of medical problems, Immell moved into a Madison nursing home. He died there on August 29, 1969. His second wife survived him.

== Electoral history ==
=== Wisconsin Governor (1946) ===
Wisconsin Gubernatorial Election, 1946
Party	Candidate	Votes	%	±%
Republican Primary, August 13, 1946
Republican	Walter Samuel Goodland (incumbent)	193,199	42.44%	−4.69pp
Republican	Ralph M. Immell	177,816	39.06%	
Republican	Delbert J. Kenny	73,149	16.07%	−9.35pp
Republican	Otto R. Werkmeister	5,680	1.25%	
Republican	Ralph F. Amoth	5,329	1.17%	
	Scattering	103	0.02%	
Plurality		15,383	3.38%	-18.33pp
Total votes		455,276	100.0%	+45.59%

=== Wisconsin Governor (1948) ===
Wisconsin Gubernatorial Election, 1948
Party	Candidate	Votes	%	±%
Republican Primary, September 21, 1948
Republican	Oscar Rennebohm	278,650	58.18%	
Republican	Ralph M. Immell	200,248	41.81%	+2.75pp
	Scattering	103	0.02%	
Plurality		78,402	16.37%	+12.99pp
Total votes		478,975	100.0%	+5.21%

Military offices
Preceded by John G. Salsman	Adjutant General of Wisconsin; June 1, 1923 – May 11, 1946	Succeeded by Alvin A. Kuechenmeister
