= Blaska =

Blaska is a surname. Notable people with the surname include:

- Jerome L. Blaska (1919–2000), American politician, son of John
- John M. Blaska (1885–1957), American politician
