= Carl W. Thompson =

20th century American politician

Carl Thompson
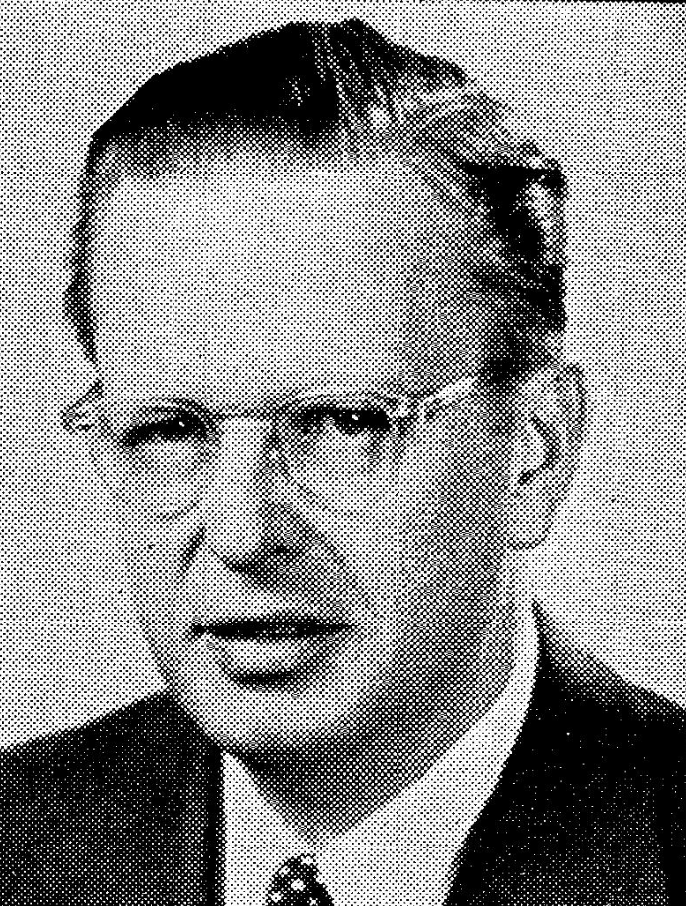

Member of the Wisconsin Senate from the 16th district
- In office April 15, 1959 – January 7, 1985
- Preceded by: Gaylord Nelson
- Succeeded by: Charles Chvala

Member of the Wisconsin State Assembly
- In office January 3, 1955 – April 15, 1959
- Preceded by: Position established
- Succeeded by: Jerome L. Blaska
- Constituency: Dane 4th district
- In office January 5, 1953 – January 3, 1955
- Preceded by: William Proxmire
- Succeeded by: Ivan A. Nestingen
- Constituency: Dane 2nd district

Personal details
- Born: Carl William Thompson Jr. March 15, 1914 Washington, D.C., U.S.
- Died: September 19, 2002 (aged 88) Stoughton, Wisconsin, U.S.
- Resting place: Graves Cemetery, Rutland, Wisconsin
- Party: Democratic
- Spouse: Marian Lucile Foster (m. 1942–2002)
- Children: 4
- Education: University of Wisconsin-Madison; University of Wisconsin Law School
- Occupation: lawyer, politician

Military service
- Allegiance: United States
- Branch/service: United States Army
- Years of service: 1942–1946
- Rank: 1st Lieutenant
- Battles/wars: World War II

Carl William Thompson (March 15, 1914 – September 19, 2002) was an American lawyer and Democratic politician. He served 26 years in the Wisconsin State Senate and six years in the State Assembly, representing Dane County. He was an unsuccessful candidate for Governor of Wisconsin in 1948 and 1950.

== Biography ==
Carl William Thompson was born on March 15, 1914, in Washington, D.C., to Carl W. Thompson, Sr., and Hannah Hegge Thompson. He graduated from high school in Stoughton, Wisconsin, before graduating from the University of Wisconsin-Madison and the University of Wisconsin Law School. During World War II, he served in the United States Army. Thompson died on September 19, 2002, in Stoughton. He was married with four children.

== Political career ==
Thompson was a presidential elector for the 1948 presidential election. From 1949 to 1956, he was a member of the Democratic National Committee. In 1947, he was a candidate in for the United States House of Representatives from Wisconsin's 2nd congressional district in the special election following the death of Robert Kirkland Henry. He lost to Glenn Robert Davis. Thompson was twice an unsuccessful candidate for Governor of Wisconsin, losing to incumbent Oscar Rennebohm in 1948 and to Walter J. Kohler Jr., in 1950, and was a delegate to the Democratic National Convention in 1952 and 1956. After serving as an alderman and city attorney in Stoughton, he was a member of the Assembly from 1953 until 1959, when he was elected to the Senate in a special election. He remained in the Senate until 1984.

== See also ==
- The Political Graveyard

Party political offices
Preceded by Daniel Hoan	Democratic nominee for Governor of Wisconsin; 1948, 1950	Succeeded by William Proxmire
Wisconsin State Assembly
Preceded by William Proxmire	Member of the Wisconsin State Assembly from the Dane 2nd district January 5, 1953 – January 3, 1955	Succeeded by Ivan A. Nestingen
New district created	Member of the Wisconsin State Assembly from the Dane 4th district January 3, 1955 – April 15, 1959	Succeeded by Jerome L. Blaska
Wisconsin Senate
Preceded by Gaylord Nelson	Member of the Wisconsin Senate from the 16th district April 15, 1959 – January 7, 1985	Succeeded by Charles Chvala
