= 1948 Wisconsin gubernatorial election =

- November 2, 1948
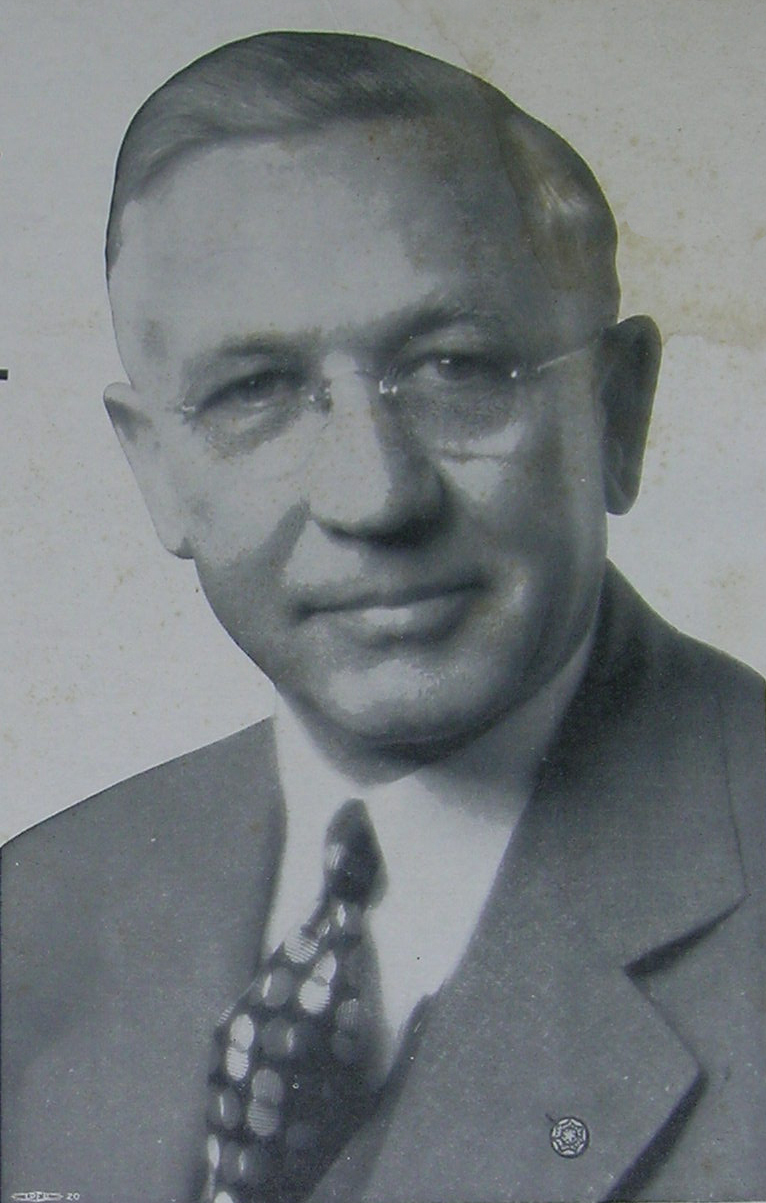

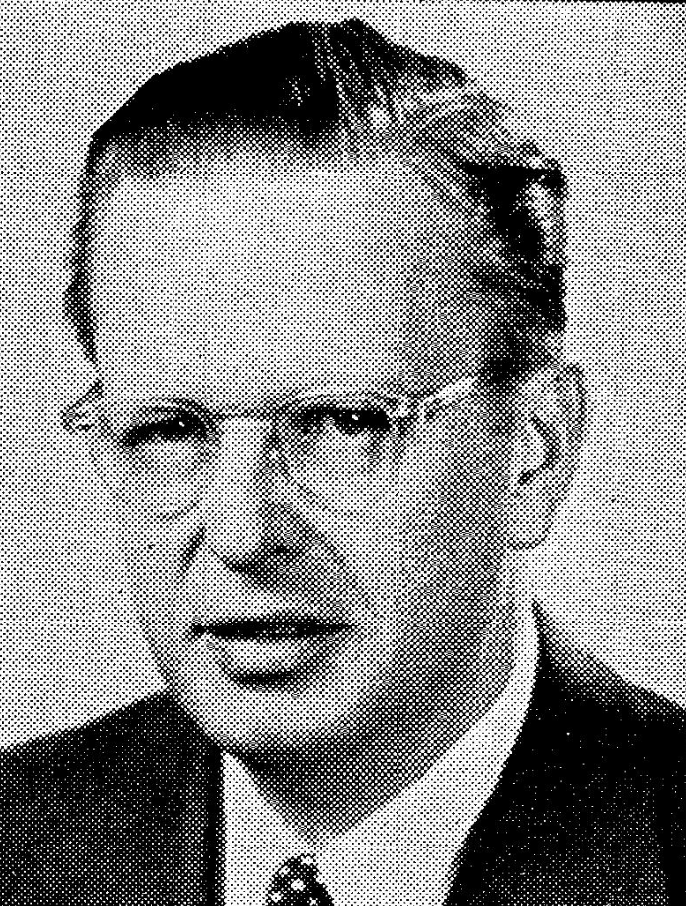
Nominee	Oscar Rennebohm	Carl W. Thompson
Party	Republican	Democratic
Popular vote	684,839	558,497
Percentage	54.09%	44.11%
- County results Rennebohm: 50–60% 60–70% 70–80% Thompson: 40–50% 50–60% 60–70%
Governor before election
Oscar Rennebohm
Republican
Elected Governor
Oscar Rennebohm
Republican

The 1948 Wisconsin gubernatorial election was held on November 2, 1948.

Incumbent Republican Governor Oscar Rennebohm defeated Democratic nominee Carl W. Thompson with 54.09% of the vote.

== Primary election ==
Primary elections were held on September 21, 1948.

=== Republican party ===
==== Candidates ====
- Ralph M. Immell, former Wisconsin Adjutant General (1923–1946) and unsuccessful candidate for Republican nomination for governor in 1946
- Oscar Rennebohm, incumbent Governor

==== Results ====
Republican primary results
Party	Candidate	Votes	%
Republican	Oscar Rennebohm (incumbent)	278,650	58.19%
Republican	Ralph M. Immell	200,248	41.81%
Total votes		478,898	100.00%

=== Democratic party ===
==== Candidates ====
- William D. Carroll, former State Senator
- Carl W. Thompson, attorney

==== Results ====
Democratic primary results
Party	Candidate	Votes	%
Democratic	Carl W. Thompson	72,084	65.32%
Democratic	William D. Carroll	38,275	34.68%
Total votes		110,359	100.00%

=== People's Progressive party ===
==== Candidates ====
- Henry J. Berquist, candidate for lieutenant governor in 1942

==== Results ====
People's Progressive primary results
Party	Candidate	Votes	%
Progressive	Henry J. Berquist	6,525	100.00%
Total votes		6,525	100.00%

=== Social-Democratic party ===
==== Candidates ====
- Walter H. Uphoff, candidate for governor in 1946

==== Results ====
Social-Democratic primary results
Party	Candidate	Votes	%
Social-Democratic	Walter H. Uphoff	3,798	100.00%
Total votes		3,798	100.00%

== General election ==
=== Candidates ===
Major party candidates

- Carl W. Thompson, Democratic
- Oscar Rennebohm, Republican

Other candidates

- Henry J. Berquist, People's Progressive
- James E. Boulton, Socialist Workers, industrial worker, candidate for Mayor of Milwaukee in March 1948
- Georgia Cozzini, Socialist Labor, candidate for governor in 1942 and 1944
- Walter H. Uphoff, Social-Democratic

=== Results ===
1948 Wisconsin gubernatorial election
Party	Candidate	Votes	%	±%
Republican	Oscar Rennebohm (incumbent)	684,839	54.09%	−5.69%
Democratic	Carl W. Thompson	558,497	44.11%	+5.04%
Progressive	Henry J. Berquist	12,928	1.02%	
Social-Democratic	Walter H. Uphoff	9,149	0.72%	−0.14%
Socialist Workers (Note: "Independent Socialist Workers")	James E. Boulton	356	0.03%	−0.15%
Socialist Labor (Note: "Independent Socialist Labor")	Georgia Cozzini	328	0.03%	−0.07%
	Scattering (Note: These are not listed in the Blue Book but are listed in the Board of Canvassers report.)	42	0.00%	
Majority		126,342	9.98%	
Total votes		1,266,139	100.00%	
Republican hold		Swing	-10.73%	

=== Results by county ===
County	Oscar Rennebohm Republican		Carl W. Thompson Democratic		Henry J. Berquist Progressive		Walter H. Uphoff Social-Democratic		All Others Various		Margin		Total votes cast
County	#	%	#	%	#	%	#	%	#	%	#	%	Total votes cast
Adams	1,635	61.03%	1,009	37.66%	28	1.05%	7	0.26%	0	0.00%	626	23.37%	2,679
Ashland	4,469	62.29%	2,432	33.90%	249	3.47%	21	0.29%	3	0.04%	2,037	28.39%	7,174
Barron	7,373	62.22%	4,214	35.56%	233	1.97%	28	0.24%	1	0.01%	3,159	26.66%	11,849
Bayfield	3,239	58.51%	1,915	34.59%	362	6.54%	17	0.31%	3	0.05%	1,324	23.92%	5,536
Brown	18,163	51.17%	17,258	48.62%	46	0.13%	27	0.08%	4	0.01%	905	2.55%	35,498
Buffalo	3,144	67.04%	1,497	31.92%	19	0.41%	27	0.58%	3	0.06%	1,647	35.12%	4,690
Burnett	2,086	56.09%	1,536	41.30%	86	2.31%	7	0.19%	4	0.11%	550	14.79%	3,719
Calumet	4,535	66.10%	2,310	33.67%	11	0.16%	5	0.07%	0	0.00%	2,225	32.43%	6,861
Chippewa	8,376	60.00%	5,447	39.02%	100	0.72%	33	0.24%	3	0.02%	2,929	20.98%	13,959
Clark	7,322	67.45%	3,205	29.52%	267	2.46%	56	0.52%	6	0.06%	4,117	37.92%	10,856
Columbia	7,309	59.20%	5,003	40.52%	16	0.13%	19	0.15%	0	0.00%	2,306	18.68%	12,347
Crawford	3,680	53.78%	3,148	46.00%	3	0.04%	9	0.13%	3	0.04%	532	7.77%	6,843
Dane	23,669	38.28%	37,602	60.81%	219	0.35%	340	0.55%	6	0.01%	-13,933	-22.53%	61,836
Dodge	12,269	63.45%	7,023	36.32%	1	0.01%	41	0.21%	2	0.01%	5,246	27.13%	19,336
Door	5,123	70.60%	2,109	29.07%	17	0.23%	7	0.10%	0	0.00%	3,014	41.54%	7,256
Douglas	8,658	47.29%	9,034	49.34%	560	3.06%	42	0.23%	15	0.08%	-376	-2.05%	18,309
Dunn	5,634	61.72%	3,404	37.29%	65	0.71%	20	0.22%	6	0.07%	2,230	24.43%	9,129
Eau Claire	10,614	58.69%	7,359	40.69%	65	0.36%	39	0.22%	8	0.04%	3,255	18.00%	18,085
Florence	949	55.14%	508	29.52%	252	14.64%	10	0.58%	2	0.12%	441	25.62%	1,721
Fond du Lac	15,910	67.75%	7,396	31.49%	79	0.34%	97	0.41%	3	0.01%	8,514	36.25%	23,485
Forest	1,518	45.10%	1,699	50.48%	131	3.89%	17	0.51%	1	0.03%	-181	-5.38%	3,366
Grant	9,759	65.51%	5,102	34.25%	11	0.07%	17	0.11%	7	0.05%	4,657	31.26%	14,896
Green	5,598	66.38%	2,800	33.20%	17	0.20%	16	0.19%	2	0.02%	2,798	33.18%	8,433
Green Lake	4,342	74.86%	1,428	24.62%	16	0.28%	13	0.22%	1	0.02%	2,914	50.24%	5,800
Iowa	4,541	59.58%	3,050	40.02%	16	0.21%	10	0.13%	5	0.07%	1,491	19.56%	7,622
Iron	1,537	43.27%	1,830	51.52%	173	4.87%	7	0.20%	5	0.14%	-293	-8.25%	3,552
Jackson	3,468	64.19%	1,892	35.02%	18	0.33%	24	0.44%	1	0.02%	1,576	29.17%	5,403
Jefferson	9,297	57.79%	6,702	41.66%	36	0.22%	46	0.29%	6	0.04%	2,595	16.13%	16,087
Juneau	4,405	65.14%	2,311	34.18%	30	0.44%	13	0.19%	3	0.04%	2,094	30.97%	6,762
Kenosha	14,739	46.52%	16,285	51.40%	434	1.37%	201	0.63%	23	0.07%	-1,546	-4.88%	31,682
Kewaunee	3,685	61.51%	2,293	38.27%	7	0.12%	3	0.05%	3	0.05%	1,392	23.23%	5,991
La Crosse	12,543	54.51%	10,241	44.50%	82	0.36%	138	0.60%	8	0.03%	2,302	10.00%	23,012
Lafayette	3,921	54.32%	3,281	45.45%	10	0.14%	7	0.10%	0	0.00%	640	8.87%	7,219
Langlade	4,447	56.82%	3,250	41.52%	114	1.46%	13	0.17%	3	0.04%	1,197	15.29%	7,827
Lincoln	5,286	67.03%	2,475	31.38%	100	1.27%	16	0.20%	9	0.11%	2,811	35.65%	7,886
Manitowoc	12,877	52.83%	11,330	46.48%	93	0.38%	70	0.29%	4	0.02%	1,547	6.35%	24,374
Marathon	14,215	51.01%	13,300	47.72%	171	0.61%	171	0.61%	9	0.03%	915	3.28%	27,869
Marinette	7,406	58.14%	5,195	40.78%	101	0.79%	35	0.27%	1	0.01%	2,211	17.36%	12,738
Marquette	2,393	74.09%	818	25.33%	13	0.40%	6	0.19%	0	0.00%	1,575	48.76%	3,230
Milwaukee	154,141	45.27%	174,598	51.28%	5,630	1.65%	5,694	1.67%	417	0.12%	-20,457	-6.01%	340,480
Monroe	6,310	60.87%	3,980	38.39%	24	0.23%	46	0.44%	7	0.07%	2,330	22.48%	10,367
Oconto	5,652	63.18%	3,242	36.24%	33	0.37%	17	0.19%	2	0.02%	2,410	26.94%	8,946
Oneida	4,686	59.00%	2,952	37.16%	279	3.51%	22	0.28%	4	0.05%	1,734	21.83%	7,943
Outagamie	18,054	65.47%	9,427	34.19%	44	0.16%	43	0.16%	6	0.02%	8,627	31.29%	27,574
Ozaukee	5,547	62.91%	3,209	36.40%	47	0.53%	14	0.16%	0	0.00%	2,338	26.52%	8,817
Pepin	1,747	67.87%	803	31.20%	9	0.35%	11	0.43%	4	0.16%	944	36.67%	2,574
Pierce	5,150	64.36%	2,791	34.88%	42	0.52%	16	0.20%	3	0.04%	2,359	29.48%	8,002
Polk	5,220	56.38%	3,912	42.26%	98	1.06%	23	0.25%	5	0.05%	1,308	14.13%	9,258
Portage	5,560	40.39%	8,145	59.17%	36	0.26%	19	0.14%	5	0.04%	-2,585	-18.78%	13,765
Price	4,188	63.46%	2,101	31.84%	279	4.23%	25	0.38%	6	0.09%	2,087	31.63%	6,599
Racine	21,544	50.06%	20,885	48.53%	443	1.03%	149	0.35%	13	0.03%	659	1.53%	43,034
Richland	4,373	64.80%	2,356	34.91%	11	0.16%	2	0.03%	6	0.09%	2,017	29.89%	6,748
Rock	18,634	55.52%	14,738	43.91%	91	0.27%	94	0.28%	7	0.02%	3,896	11.61%	33,564
Rusk	3,609	59.84%	2,269	37.62%	136	2.26%	17	0.28%	0	0.00%	1,340	22.22%	6,031
Sauk	8,398	62.19%	4,960	36.73%	37	0.27%	108	0.80%	1	0.01%	3,438	25.46%	13,504
Sawyer	2,993	69.28%	1,253	29.00%	61	1.41%	11	0.25%	2	0.05%	1,740	40.28%	4,320
Shawano	7,575	69.97%	3,169	29.27%	53	0.49%	26	0.24%	3	0.03%	4,406	40.70%	10,826
Sheboygan	14,161	47.43%	14,888	49.86%	348	1.17%	435	1.46%	26	0.09%	-727	-2.43%	29,858
St. Croix	5,929	57.57%	4,303	41.78%	35	0.34%	31	0.30%	1	0.01%	1,626	15.79%	10,299
Taylor	3,520	57.81%	2,300	37.77%	119	1.95%	150	2.46%	0	0.00%	1,220	20.04%	6,089
Trempealeau	4,449	55.22%	3,579	44.42%	15	0.19%	12	0.15%	2	0.02%	870	10.80%	8,057
Vernon	5,087	52.94%	4,503	46.86%	11	0.11%	7	0.07%	1	0.01%	584	6.08%	9,609
Vilas	2,979	67.64%	1,266	28.75%	141	3.20%	17	0.39%	1	0.02%	1,713	38.90%	4,404
Walworth	11,789	73.02%	4,243	26.28%	76	0.47%	33	0.20%	3	0.02%	7,546	46.74%	16,144
Washburn	2,795	59.52%	1,693	36.05%	193	4.11%	6	0.13%	9	0.19%	1,102	23.47%	4,696
Washington	7,819	67.36%	3,719	32.04%	25	0.22%	45	0.39%	0	0.00%	4,100	35.32%	11,608
Waukesha	19,110	59.95%	12,481	39.15%	135	0.42%	141	0.44%	11	0.03%	6,629	20.79%	31,878
Waupaca	9,919	75.49%	3,163	24.07%	41	0.31%	16	0.12%	1	0.01%	6,756	51.42%	13,140
Waushara	3,990	76.95%	1,128	21.76%	49	0.95%	17	0.33%	1	0.02%	2,862	55.20%	5,185
Winnebago	19,784	62.57%	11,541	36.50%	91	0.29%	189	0.60%	13	0.04%	8,243	26.07%	31,618
Wood	9,993	61.36%	6,209	38.13%	45	0.28%	35	0.21%	3	0.02%	3,784	23.24%	16,285
Total	684,839	54.09%	558,497	44.11%	12,928	1.02%	9,149	0.72%	726	0.06%	126,342	9.98%	1,266,139

==== Counties that flipped from Democratic to Republican ====
- Ashland
- Bayfield
- Racine
- Vilas

==== Counties that flipped from Republican to Democratic ====
- Dane
- Milwaukee
- Portage
- Sheboygan

== Bibliography ==
- Gubernatorial Elections, 1787-1997. Washington, D.C.: Congressional Quarterly Inc. 1998. ISBN 1-56802-396-0.
- Ohm, Howard F.; Kuehn, Hazel L., eds. (1950). The Wisconsin Blue Book, 1950. State of Wisconsin.
