= Garden Homes Historic District (Milwaukee, Wisconsin) =

Historic district in Wisconsin, United States

- U.S. National Register of Historic Places
- U.S. Historic district
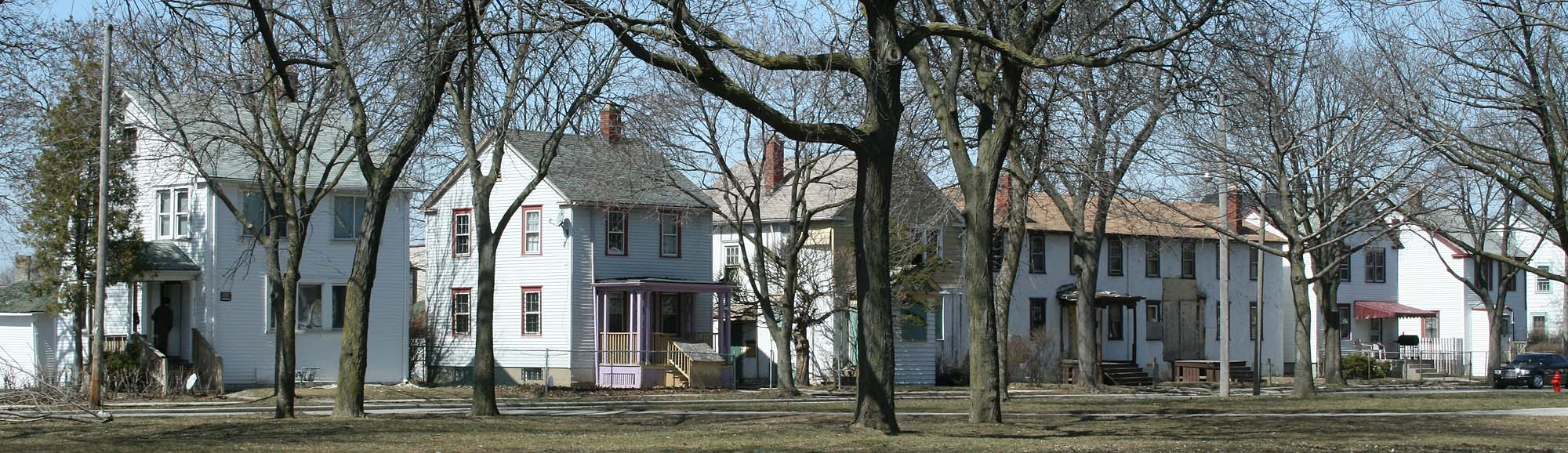

- Location within Wisconsin Location within the United States
- Nearest city: Milwaukee, Wisconsin
- Coordinates: 43°05′49.6″N 87°56′43.5″W
- Area: 29 acres (12 ha)
- Built: 1921-1923
- Architect: William Schuchardt
- Architectural style: Colonial Revival
- NRHP reference No.: 90000669
- Added to NRHP: May 4, 1990

The Garden Homes Historic District in Milwaukee, Wisconsin is a historic district that was listed on the National Register of Historic Places in 1990. Under socialist mayor Daniel Hoan, the City of Milwaukee implemented the country's first public housing project in 1923. This experiment with a municipally-sponsored housing cooperative saw initial success, but was plagued by development and land acquisition problems. The board overseeing the project dissolved the Gardens Home Corporation just two years after construction of the homes was completed.

== History ==
The Gardens Homes housing project had its start during the 1910 election campaign of Milwaukee's first socialist mayor, Emil Seidel, who ran on a platform that included construction of low cost, city-built, homes for workers. Though Seidel was soundly defeated in 1912, the city's second socialist mayor, Daniel Hoan, was able to get a project started to ease Milwaukee's housing shortage. The shortage, caused by rapid growth of Milwaukee's manufacturing sector, was worsened by the World War I-era moratorium on new housing construction. Because the city's housing shortage had started before World War I, and it could not prove the lack of housing was delaying the production of war materials, it was unable to obtain federal aid.

After the war, Milwaukee's housing commission proposed a cooperative housing project. It was funded in two ways. The initial cost was to be financed by the sale of preferred stock in the Garden Homes Project, sold to city and county governments, and also made available to any other investor. The preferred stock was expected to pay a 5 percent dividend per year. The occupants of the housing would purchase common stock in the project, equal to the value of the home. They would put 10 percent down, and make payments over the next 20 years, including interest, taxes, upkeep, and other costs. After about 20 years, the preferred stock would mature and be retired, and the tenants would then own the corporation. At that time, the common shareholders could elect to convert the project to individual ownership.

This concept was based on a similar plan in England, promoted by Ebenezer Howard's garden city concept from the Garden Cities of Tomorrow published in 1900. About 60 housing associations had been established there by 1919. Several streets in Garden Homes would initially be named after garden cities in England, including Ealing, Hampstead, Port Sunlight, Bournville, and Letchworth.

With $177,300 of preferred stock sold, construction began in 1921, and was completed by 1923. Though 162 units were planned for, only 105 units in 93 individual buildings were built. The shortfall was caused by a failure to sell a sufficient quantity of additional preferred stock to private investors. City and county governments invested a total of $412,000 by the end of 1924. With 700 applicants for housing, all 105 units were soon occupied.

Shortly thereafter, problems involving the annexation of the Garden Homes project by the city ensued. Legal battles delayed street improvements in the project. After annexation, the city assessed the tenants for street and storm sewer improvements. Many residents had thought their monthly payments included streets and sewers. The city did not. There were also disagreements about the actual costs of the homes, which has generally been built for less than the cost of a comparable home elsewhere in the city. Tenants were also unsure about the value of private improvements to their units if the plan was not eventually converted to individual ownership.

By June 1925, state lawmakers had voted to permit the sale, rather than lease, of the project houses. Soon thereafter, the Garden Homes project board of directors disbanded the cooperative, allowing the tenants to purchase their units. A problem-filled ten years were spent selling homes, paying off loans, and arguing over tax assessments on profits of selling the houses. By the late 1930s, only 40 percent of the original occupants still lived in Garden Homes. Though the process was fractious, the cooperative remained solvent and all bills were paid. By the 1920s, the streets, originally named after English garden cities, had been given names such as Congress, 25th, and 26th streets to conform Milwaukee's city street names.

== Historic district ==
The district includes all of the 93 original buildings, comprising 105 housing units; and the original Garden Homes park, a green space between the north and southbound lanes of north Twenty-sixth street at Port Sunlight Way and West Atkinson Avenue. Presently the Garden Homes Neighborhood Association is working to restore the neighborhood to its original beauty. The buildings have a similar look, to save on construction cost. They are based on one of nine exterior designs which were varied by reversing the floor plans and switching from front to side gables. The houses are two-story, rectangular, front or side-gabled cottages in a simplified Colonial Revival style.
