= Daniel Hoan =

American politician (1881–1961)

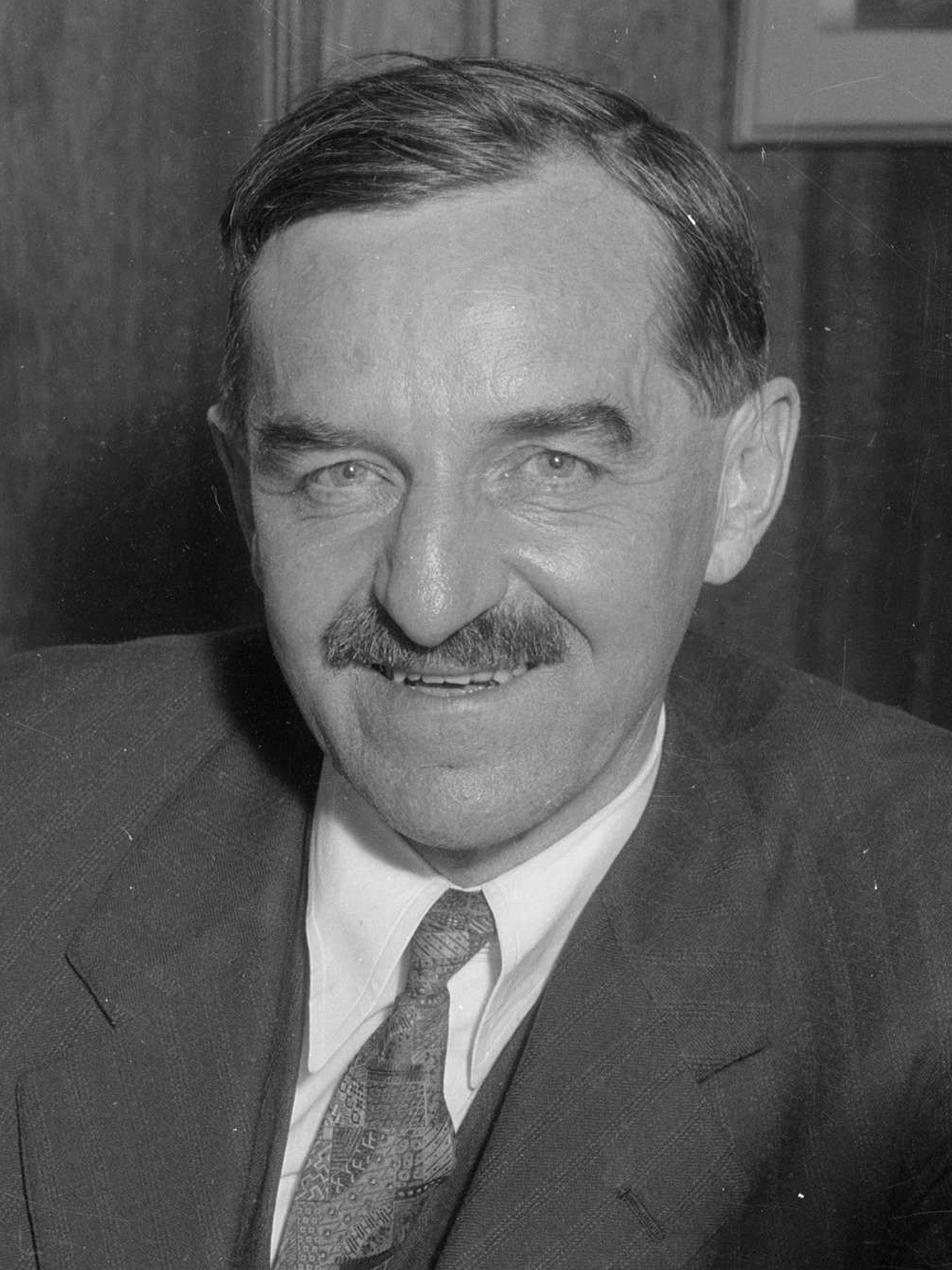
- Hoan c. 1930

38th Mayor of Milwaukee
- In office April 18, 1916 – April 16, 1940
- Preceded by: Gerhard Adolph Bading
- Succeeded by: Carl Zeidler

4th President of the United States Conference of Mayors
- In office 1934–1935
- Preceded by: T. Semmes Walmsley
- Succeeded by: Fiorello La Guardia

City Attorney of Milwaukee
- In office April 19, 1910 – April 18, 1916

Personal details
- Born: Daniel Webster Hoan Jr. March 12, 1881 Waukesha, Wisconsin, U.S.
- Died: June 11, 1961 (aged 80) Milwaukee, Wisconsin, U.S.
- Party: Socialist (until 1940); Democratic (after 1940)
- Spouses: Agnes Bernice Magner (m. 1909; died 1941); Gladys Arthur Townsend (m. 1944; died 1952)
- Children: 2
- Profession: Labor attorney

Daniel Webster Hoan Jr. (March 12, 1881 – June 11, 1961) was an American politician who served as the 32nd Mayor of Milwaukee, Wisconsin from 1916 to 1940. A lawyer who had served as Milwaukee City Attorney from 1910 to 1916, Hoan was a prominent figure in Socialist politics and Milwaukee's second Socialist mayor. His 24-year administration remains the longest continuous Socialist administration in United States history. A panel of 69 scholars in 1993 ranked him among the ten best mayors in American history.

== Early years ==
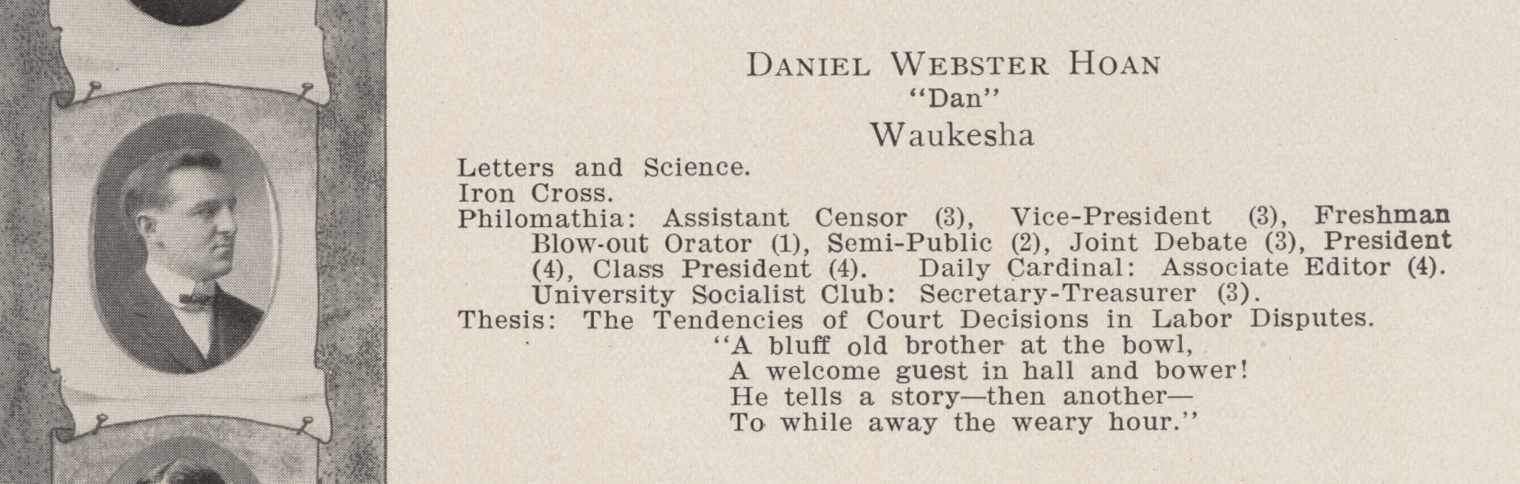
Hoan in the University of Wisconsin–Madison yearbook, 1906

Hoan was born in Waukesha, Wisconsin, on March 12, 1881, to Daniel Sr. and Margaret Augusta (née Hood) Hoan. Hoan entered the University of Wisconsin in Madison in the fall of 1901. He helped organize the University of Wisconsin Socialist Club in November 1901, a group which consisted of just four members during its first year. Hoan served as secretary of that organization for the 1902/03 academic year.

In 1908, Hoan passed the Wisconsin state bar exam and became a lawyer. A member of the Socialist Party, Hoan moved to Milwaukee where he worked closely with Victor Berger, the editor of The Milwaukee Leader, a socialist newspaper, in trying to persuade the city to adopt radical reforms. These included municipal ownership of utilities, urban renewal programs, and free legal, medical and educational services. In 1909, Hoan was enlisted by the Wisconsin State Federation of Labor to draft the nation's first successful workmen's compensation legislation.

== City attorney (1910–1916) ==
Hoan began his political career with his election as city attorney of Milwaukee in 1910. He won the election by a plurality of more than 7,300 votes out of about 59,000 votes cast over Democratic and Republican opponents. This was the same year Emil Seidel was elected mayor of Milwaukee as the first socialist leader of a major city in the United States. Over the next six years, Hoan clamped down on the corruption of public officials.

== Mayoralty (1916–1940) ==
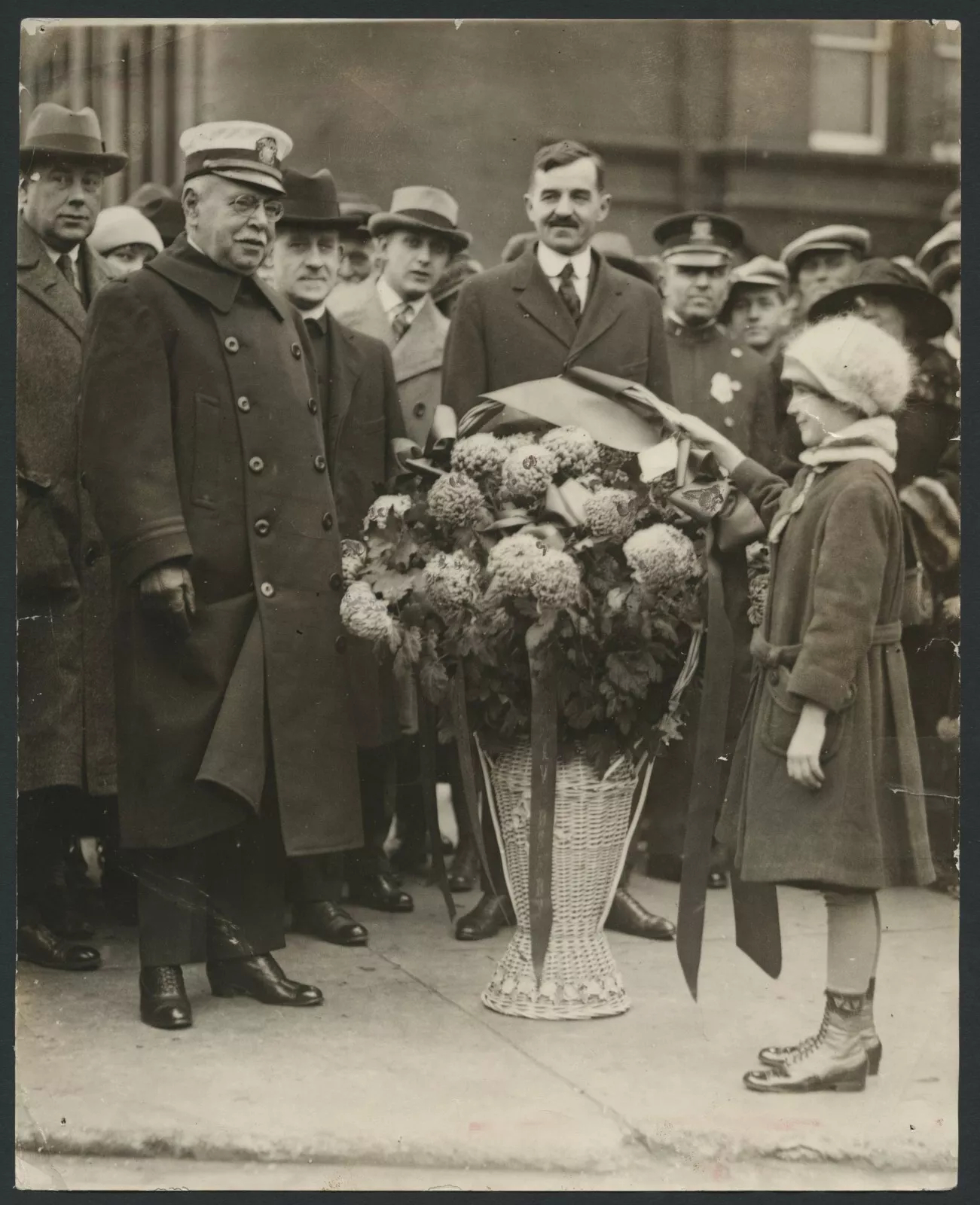
Famed band director John Philip Sousa presented with a basket of flowers in honor of his 70th birthday by Mayor Hoan and his daughter, Agnes

In 1916, Hoan was elected as mayor of Milwaukee. He remained mayor for 24 years, the longest continuous Socialist administration in United States history. Part of the reason for Hoan's electoral success was his break with the rest of the Socialist Party on the issue of United States entry into the First World War. The Socialist Party opposed entry; Hoan did not. Instead, as mayor, he organized the Milwaukee County Council of Defense on April 30, 1917.

As mayor, Hoan developed a reputation for honest and efficient government. He implemented progressive reforms, including the country's first city-sponsored public housing project, Garden Homes, started in 1923. He also led the successful drive towards municipal ownership of the stone quarry, street lighting, sewage disposal, and water purification. Hoan also oversaw the creation of the Milwaukee County park system.

During Hoan's administration, Milwaukee implemented a public bus system. This was prompted by dangerous accidents: pedestrians were run over by street trolleys that ran down the middle of the road. Among the victims of such streetcar accidents was Hoan's fellow Socialist, Victor L. Berger, who was killed in a street car accident in 1929.

A highway system was started under Hoan's administration, but federal funding was scarce. The system was later expanded to include the Hoan Bridge, which was completed in 1972 but not opened to the public until 1977.

=== National politics ===
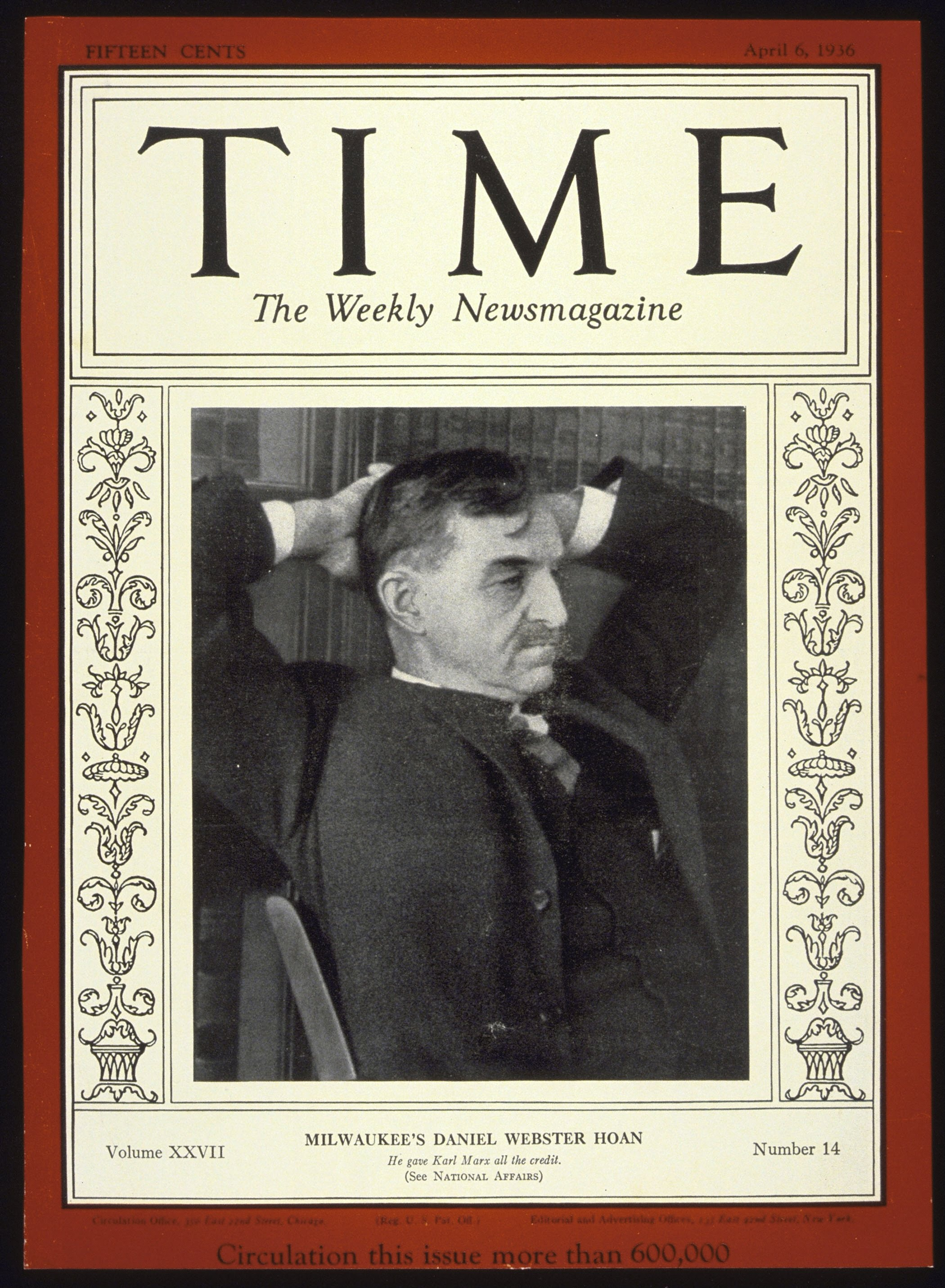
Hoan ont he cover of Time, April 6, 1936

At the 1932 Socialist National Convention, Hoan ran for national chairman of the party against incumbent Morris Hillquit. In addition to the "constructive Socialists" from Wisconsin, Hoan garnered the support of the young Marxist "militant" faction and the radicals around Norman Thomas, but this bloc was insufficient to unseat Hillquit, who won reelection by a vote of 105–86.

Hoan was president of the United States Conference of Mayors in 1934 and 1935.

After ten years on the governing National Executive Committee of the Socialist Party, Hoan pointedly had his name removed from consideration at the special party convention of 1937. Although Hoan provided no formal reason, convention participants speculated in an Associated Press story which made the front page of The New York Times that Hoan did not wish to be placed in the position of supporting the national organizing drive of the Congress of Industrial Organizations (CIO) in opposition to the American Federation of Labor.

=== Assessments ===
Today, Hoan is remembered as one of the best mayors in Milwaukee's history. A 1993 survey of historians, political scientists and urban experts conducted by Melvin G. Holli of the University of Illinois at Chicago saw Hoan ranked as the eighth-best American big-city mayor to serve between the years 1820 and 1993.. In 1999, Holli wrote,

"Although this self-identified socialist had difficulty pushing progressive legislation through a nonpartisan city council, he experimented with the municipal marketing of food, backed city-built housing, and in providing public markets, city harbor improvements, and purging graft from Milwaukee politics. Perhaps Hoan's most important legacy was cleaning up the free-and-easy corruption that prevailed before he took office."

== Post-mayoralty ==
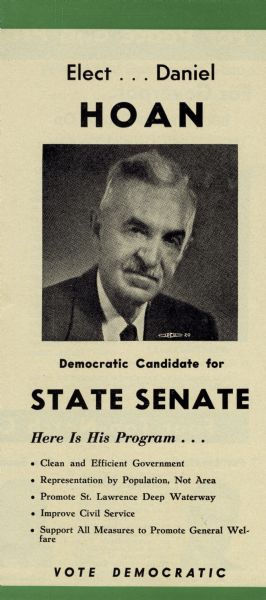
A brochure from Hoan's 1952 State Senate campaign

Hoan was defeated in the Milwaukee mayoral campaign of 1940. He remains the last sitting mayor of Milwaukee to be defeated in a re-election bid. The following year, he left the Socialist Party and joined the Democratic Party. He ran unsuccessfully for governor in 1944 and 1946. In 1948, he was unsuccessful in his attempt to once again become mayor of Milwaukee when he was defeated by the Socialist Party's candidate, Frank P. Zeidler.

== Family ==
On October 9, 1909, the non-religious Hoan, a member of the Knights of Pythias, married Agnes Bernice Magner (1883–1941), a devout Catholic. She was active in her husband's political campaigns and in women's organizations including the Women's International League for Peace and Freedom. They had two children:

- Daniel Webster Hoan III (1910–1988)
- Agnes, later Mrs. Agnes B. Steininger (1915–1993)

Daniel Hoan, a widower since December 28, 1941, married Gladys Arthur Townsend (1901–1952), a divorced Indiana schoolteacher two decades his junior, on April 7, 1944, in Delaware, Indiana. His second wife, Gladys, died in 1952, leaving him a widower once again. He did not remarry.

== Death and legacy ==
Hoan died on June 11, 1961, at 80 years old, from a heart ailment, in Milwaukee.

Hoan's mayoral papers reside with the Milwaukee Public Library, Milwaukee. Additional Hoan papers are located at the Milwaukee County Historical Society. The Hoan Bridge on Milwaukee's lakefront is the most visible monument that bears his name.

== Works ==
- The Failure of Regulation. Chicago: Socialist Party of the United States, 1914.
- Lincoln, the Commoner: Helped in Fight for Education for Workers. Saginaw, MI: Saginaw County Socialist Party, n.d. [192-].
- Socialism and the City: How to Remove Chaos and Put Order and Beauty into American Cities. Girard, KS: Haldeman-Julius Publications, 1931.
- Taxes and Tax Dodgers. Chicago: Committee on Education and Research, Socialist Party of America, 1933.
- Abraham Lincoln: A Real American. Chicago: Socialist Party of the US, n.d. [c. 1936].
- City Government: The record of the Milwaukee Experiment. New York: Harcourt, Brace and Co., 1936.
- Why a Farmer-Labor Progressive Federation? : Address Delivered to the Convention on Saturday, May 21, 1938, at Madison. Milwaukee: The Federation, 1938.
- Dollars vs. The People. Milwaukee: Milwaukee County Central Campaign Committee, n.d. [1940].
- The St. Lawrence Seaway: Navigation Aspects. n.c.: Great Lakes Harbors Association n.d, [1948?].

== See also ==
- List of elected socialist mayors in the United States
- List of mayors of Milwaukee
- Sewer socialism
- Emil Seidel
- Frank P. Zeidler
- Social-Democratic Party of Wisconsin

== Sources ==
- Beck, Elmer A. The Sewer Socialists: A History of the Socialist Party of Wisconsin, 1897–1940. (2 vols.) Fennimore, WI: Westburg, 1982.
- Benoit, Edward A., A Democracy of Its Own: Milwaukee's Socialisms, Difference and Pragmatism. MA thesis. University of Wisconsin-Milwaukee, 2009.
- Kerstein, Edward S. Milwaukee's All-American Mayor: Portrait of Daniel Webster Hoan. Englewood Cliffs, NJ: Prentice-Hall, 1966.
- Reinders, Robert C. "Daniel W. Hoan and the Milwaukee Socialist Party during the First World War," Wisconsin Magazine of History, vol. 36, no. 1 (Autumn 1952), pp. 48–55.
- Stevens, Michael E. Give 'em Hell, Dan! How Daniel Webster Hoan Changed Wisconsin Politics", Wisconsin Magazine of History, vol. 98, no. 1 (Autumn 2014), pp. 16–27.

Party political offices
| Preceded by William C. Sullivan | Democratic nominee for Governor of Wisconsin; 1944, 1946 | Succeeded by Carl W. Thompson |
Political offices
| Preceded by Gerhard A. Bading | Mayor of Milwaukee; 1916–1940 | Succeeded by Carl Zeidler |
