= 1946 Wisconsin gubernatorial election =

- November 5, 1946
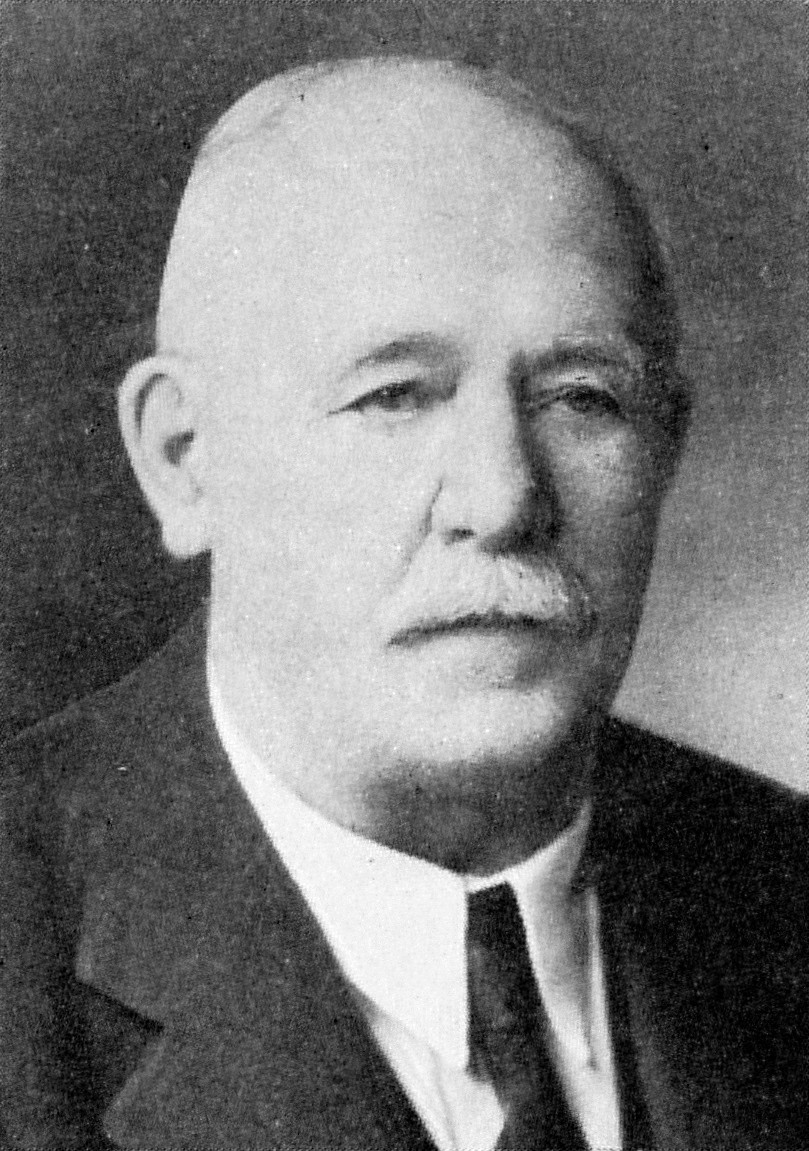

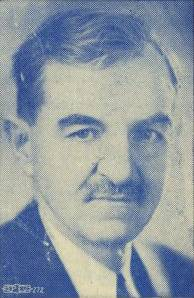
Nominee	Walter Samuel Goodland	Daniel Hoan
Party	Republican	Democratic
Popular vote	621,970	406,499
Percentage	59.78%	39.07%
- County results Goodland: 50–60% 60–70% 70–80% 80–90% Hoan: 50–60%
Governor before election
Walter Samuel Goodland
Republican
Elected Governor
Walter Samuel Goodland
Republican

The 1946 Wisconsin gubernatorial election was held on November 5, 1946.

Incumbent Republican Governor Walter Samuel Goodland defeated Democratic nominee Daniel Hoan in a rematch of the 1944 election with 59.78% of the vote.

Goodland was the last Republican until Tommy Thompson in 1990 to win Milwaukee County.

== Primary election ==
Primary elections were held on August 13, 1946.

=== Republican party ===
==== Candidates ====
- Ralph F. Amoth, unsuccessful candidate for Progressive nomination for governor in 1944
- Walter S. Goodland, incumbent governor
- Ralph M. Immell, former Wisconsin Adjutant General (1923–1946)
- Delbert J. Kenny, businessman and unsuccessful candidate for Republican nomination for governor in 1944
- Otto R. Werkmeister, unsuccessful candidate for Republican nomination for lieutenant governor in 1944

==== Results ====
Republican primary results
Party	Candidate	Votes	%
Republican	Walter S. Goodland (incumbent)	193,199	42.45%
Republican	Ralph M. Immell	177,816	39.07%
Republican	Delbert J. Kenny	73,149	16.07%
Republican	Otto R. Werkmeister	5,680	1.25%
Republican	Ralph F. Amoth	5,329	1.17%
Total votes		455,173	100.00%

=== Democratic party ===
==== Candidates ====
- Daniel W. Hoan, former Mayor of Milwaukee and Democratic candidate for governor in 1944
- Stanley Z. Fajkowski, former tavern keeper and unsuccessful candidate for Democratic nomination for governor in 1942

==== Results ====
Democratic primary results
Party	Candidate	Votes	%
Democratic	Daniel W. Hoan	56,445	77.33%
Democratic	Stanley Z. Fajkowski	16,546	22.67%
Total votes		72,991	100.00%

=== Social-Democratic party ===
==== Candidates ====
- Walter H. Uphoff, candidate for U.S. Senate in 1944

==== Results ====
Social-Democratic primary results
Party	Candidate	Votes	%
Social-Democratic	Walter H. Uphoff	3,806	100.00%
Total votes		3,806	100.00%

== General election ==
=== Candidates ===
Major party candidates

- Walter S. Goodland, Democratic
- Daniel W. Hoan, Republican

Other candidates

- Sigmund G. Eisenscher, Communist
- Jerry R. Kenyon, Socialist Labor
- Walter H. Uphoff, Social-Democratic

=== Results ===
1946 Wisconsin gubernatorial election
Party	Candidate	Votes	%	±%
Republican	Walter S. Goodland (incumbent)	621,970	59.78%	+6.94%
Democratic	Daniel W. Hoan	406,499	39.07%	−1.55%
Social-Democratic	Walter H. Uphoff	8,996	0.87%	+0.17%
Communist (Note: "Independent Communist")	Sigmund G. Eisenscher	1,857	0.18%	
Socialist Labor (Note: "Independent Socialist Labor")	Jerry R. Kenyon	959	0.09%	
	Scattering (Note: These are not listed in the Blue Book but are listed in the Board of Canvassers report.)	163	0.02%	
Majority		215,471	20.71%	
Total votes		1,040,444	100.00%	
Republican hold		Swing	+8.49%	

=== Results by county ===
County	Walter S. Goodland Republican		Daniel W. Hoan Democratic		Walter H. Uphoff Social-Democratic		All Others Various		Margin		Total votes cast
County	#	%	#	%	#	%	#	%	#	%	Total votes cast
Adams	1,387	63.19%	790	35.99%	14	0.64%	4	0.18%	597	27.20%	2,195
Ashland	2,705	46.41%	3,066	52.60%	23	0.39%	35	0.60%	-361	-6.19%	5,829
Barron	5,172	63.48%	2,938	36.06%	29	0.36%	8	0.10%	2,234	27.42%	8,147
Bayfield	2,082	46.75%	2,345	52.66%	16	0.36%	10	0.22%	-263	-5.91%	4,453
Brown	17,966	57.38%	13,302	42.48%	36	0.11%	6	0.02%	4,664	14.90%	31,310
Buffalo	3,131	72.26%	1,167	26.93%	25	0.58%	10	0.23%	1,964	45.33%	4,333
Burnett	1,591	57.11%	1,173	42.10%	10	0.36%	12	0.43%	418	15.00%	2,786
Calumet	4,241	67.69%	2,001	31.94%	22	0.35%	1	0.02%	2,240	35.75%	6,265
Chippewa	7,410	62.60%	4,332	36.60%	59	0.50%	36	0.30%	3,078	26.00%	11,837
Clark	6,058	69.65%	2,538	29.18%	65	0.75%	37	0.43%	3,520	40.47%	8,698
Columbia	7,250	70.97%	2,937	28.75%	29	0.28%	0	0.00%	4,313	42.22%	10,216
Crawford	3,887	64.95%	2,089	34.90%	8	0.13%	1	0.02%	1,798	30.04%	5,985
Dane	28,237	55.58%	21,942	43.19%	580	1.14%	42	0.08%	6,295	12.39%	50,801
Dodge	10,297	67.49%	4,903	32.13%	50	0.33%	8	0.05%	5,394	35.35%	15,258
Door	4,579	80.25%	1,110	19.45%	8	0.14%	9	0.16%	3,469	60.80%	5,706
Douglas	6,515	44.42%	8,037	54.80%	80	0.55%	34	0.23%	-1,522	-10.38%	14,666
Dunn	4,909	69.51%	2,115	29.95%	28	0.40%	10	0.14%	2,794	39.56%	7,062
Eau Claire	9,547	60.93%	6,050	38.61%	62	0.40%	11	0.07%	3,497	22.32%	15,670
Florence	615	57.00%	458	42.45%	5	0.46%	1	0.09%	157	14.55%	1,079
Fond du Lac	14,139	69.69%	6,036	29.75%	67	0.33%	45	0.22%	8,103	39.94%	20,287
Forest	1,260	41.04%	1,796	58.50%	10	0.33%	4	0.13%	-536	-17.46%	3,070
Grant	9,615	75.57%	3,050	23.97%	27	0.21%	32	0.25%	6,565	51.60%	12,724
Green	4,987	77.20%	1,454	22.51%	17	0.26%	2	0.03%	3,533	54.69%	6,460
Green Lake	3,824	78.93%	1,008	20.80%	5	0.10%	8	0.17%	2,816	58.12%	4,845
Iowa	5,168	75.73%	1,649	24.16%	4	0.06%	3	0.04%	3,519	51.57%	6,824
Iron	1,465	41.63%	2,028	57.63%	16	0.45%	10	0.28%	-563	-16.00%	3,519
Jackson	2,768	65.01%	1,457	34.22%	20	0.47%	13	0.31%	1,311	30.79%	4,258
Jefferson	9,202	71.03%	3,718	28.70%	32	0.25%	3	0.02%	5,484	42.33%	12,955
Juneau	3,776	73.74%	1,318	25.74%	24	0.47%	3	0.06%	2,458	48.00%	5,121
Kenosha	11,839	44.80%	14,101	53.36%	214	0.81%	273	1.03%	-2,262	-8.56%	26,427
Kewaunee	3,179	58.78%	2,220	41.05%	8	0.15%	1	0.02%	959	17.73%	5,408
La Crosse	10,904	63.57%	6,089	35.50%	122	0.71%	37	0.22%	4,815	28.07%	17,152
Lafayette	4,293	69.75%	1,843	29.94%	11	0.18%	8	0.13%	2,450	39.81%	6,155
Langlade	3,991	56.27%	3,042	42.89%	33	0.47%	27	0.38%	949	13.38%	7,093
Lincoln	4,154	65.15%	2,161	33.89%	44	0.69%	17	0.27%	1,993	31.26%	6,376
Manitowoc	11,266	53.93%	9,532	45.63%	62	0.30%	29	0.14%	1,734	8.30%	20,889
Marathon	12,688	55.22%	10,004	43.54%	266	1.16%	19	0.08%	2,684	11.68%	22,977
Marinette	6,128	67.23%	2,947	32.33%	34	0.37%	6	0.07%	3,181	34.90%	9,115
Marquette	2,116	81.83%	462	17.87%	4	0.15%	4	0.15%	1,654	63.96%	2,586
Milwaukee	148,533	52.35%	129,099	45.50%	4,513	1.59%	1,611	0.57%	19,434	6.85%	283,756
Monroe	5,693	71.75%	2,206	27.80%	31	0.39%	5	0.06%	3,487	43.94%	7,935
Oconto	5,576	69.61%	2,374	29.64%	51	0.64%	9	0.11%	3,202	39.98%	8,010
Oneida	3,113	53.86%	2,636	45.61%	21	0.36%	10	0.17%	477	8.25%	5,780
Outagamie	15,482	65.31%	8,095	34.15%	97	0.41%	31	0.13%	7,387	31.16%	23,705
Ozaukee	4,588	66.08%	2,323	33.46%	22	0.32%	10	0.14%	2,265	32.62%	6,943
Pepin	1,487	67.32%	716	32.41%	4	0.18%	2	0.09%	771	34.90%	2,209
Pierce	4,926	73.30%	1,756	26.13%	30	0.45%	8	0.12%	3,170	47.17%	6,720
Polk	4,245	61.98%	2,581	37.68%	20	0.29%	3	0.04%	1,664	24.30%	6,849
Portage	6,087	52.42%	5,499	47.35%	21	0.18%	6	0.05%	588	5.06%	11,613
Price	2,718	50.34%	2,594	48.05%	50	0.93%	37	0.69%	124	2.30%	5,399
Racine	17,265	48.60%	17,989	50.64%	183	0.52%	89	0.25%	-724	-2.04%	35,526
Richland	4,443	77.97%	1,242	21.80%	12	0.21%	1	0.02%	3,201	56.18%	5,698
Rock	18,001	66.82%	8,744	32.46%	157	0.58%	38	0.14%	9,257	34.36%	26,940
Rusk	3,296	63.17%	1,885	36.12%	21	0.40%	16	0.31%	1,411	27.04%	5,218
Sauk	8,305	74.54%	2,636	23.66%	187	1.68%	14	0.13%	5,669	50.88%	11,142
Sawyer	2,049	53.79%	1,705	44.76%	27	0.71%	28	0.74%	344	9.03%	3,809
Shawano	6,113	74.11%	2,106	25.53%	22	0.27%	8	0.10%	4,007	48.58%	8,249
Sheboygan	13,239	53.28%	10,813	43.51%	750	3.02%	47	0.19%	2,426	9.76%	24,849
St. Croix	5,459	67.55%	2,598	32.15%	19	0.24%	5	0.06%	2,861	35.40%	8,081
Taylor	2,660	52.15%	2,204	43.21%	217	4.25%	20	0.39%	456	8.94%	5,101
Trempealeau	4,468	63.96%	2,489	35.63%	16	0.23%	13	0.19%	1,979	28.33%	6,986
Vernon	4,665	66.41%	2,336	33.25%	14	0.20%	10	0.14%	2,329	33.15%	7,025
Vilas	1,443	43.19%	1,865	55.82%	8	0.24%	25	0.75%	-422	-12.63%	3,341
Walworth	9,114	80.75%	2,134	18.91%	27	0.24%	12	0.11%	6,980	61.84%	11,287
Washburn	1,707	55.95%	1,331	43.63%	7	0.23%	6	0.20%	376	12.32%	3,051
Washington	7,283	66.40%	3,653	33.30%	31	0.28%	2	0.02%	3,630	33.09%	10,969
Waukesha	17,713	72.56%	6,544	26.81%	112	0.46%	43	0.18%	11,169	45.75%	24,412
Waupaca	7,924	78.15%	2,186	21.56%	20	0.20%	10	0.10%	5,738	56.59%	10,140
Waushara	3,402	80.43%	806	19.05%	21	0.50%	1	0.02%	2,596	61.37%	4,230
Winnebago	16,906	68.31%	7,728	31.23%	83	0.34%	31	0.13%	9,178	37.09%	24,748
Wood	9,726	68.56%	4,418	31.14%	33	0.23%	9	0.06%	5,308	37.42%	14,186
Total	621,970	59.78%	406,499	39.07%	8,996	0.86%	2,979	0.29%	215,471	20.71%	1,040,444

==== Counties that flipped from Democratic to Republican ====
- Brown
- Langlade
- Milwaukee
- Portage

==== Counties that flipped from Republican to Democratic ====
- Ashland
- Bayfield

== Bibliography ==
- Gubernatorial Elections, 1787-1997. Washington, D.C.: Congressional Quarterly Inc. 1998. ISBN 1-56802-396-0.
- Ohm, Howard F.; Kuehn, Hazel L., eds. (1948). The Wisconsin Blue Book, 1948. State of Wisconsin.
