= John M. Blaska =

American politician

John Mathew Blaska (May 14, 1885 – May 26, 1957) was a member of the Wisconsin State Assembly.

== Biography ==
John Mathew Blaska was born on May 14, 1885, in Medina, Wisconsin. He later moved to Marshall, Dane County, Wisconsin. Blaska was a farmer and tobacco grower. He died on May 26, 1957.

One of Blaska's sons, Jerome, also served in the Assembly.

== Political career ==
Blaska served as a Democratic member of the Assembly from 1948 to 1950. In addition, he served on the Sun Prairie Town Board, the Dane County Board of Supervisors, and the county highway committee.

== See also ==
- The Political Graveyard
