= Walter Samuel Goodland =

American politician active in Wisconsin

Walter S. Goodland
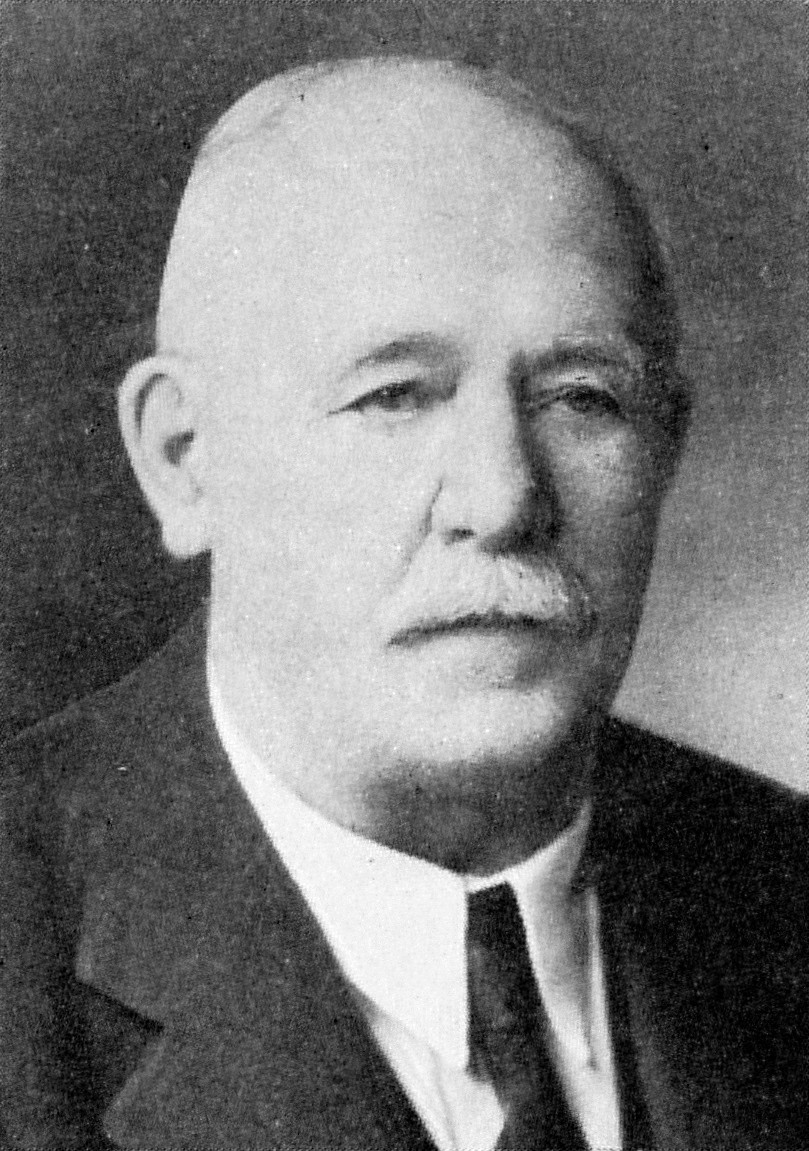

31st Governor of Wisconsin
- In office January 1, 1945 – March 12, 1947; Acting: January 4, 1943 – January 1, 1945
- Lieutenant: Oscar Rennebohm
- Preceded by: Orland Steen Loomis (elect); Julius P. Heil
- Succeeded by: Oscar Rennebohm

29th Lieutenant Governor of Wisconsin
- In office January 2, 1939 – January 1, 1945
- Governor: Julius P. Heil; Himself
- Preceded by: Herman Ekern
- Succeeded by: Oscar Rennebohm

Member of the Wisconsin Senate from the 21st district
- In office January 1, 1927 – January 1, 1935
- Preceded by: Max W. Heck
- Succeeded by: Joseph Clancy

40th Mayor of Racine, Wisconsin
- In office April 1911 – April 1915
- Preceded by: Alex J. Horlick
- Succeeded by: T. W. Thiesen

Personal details
- Born: Walter Samuel Goodland; December 22, 1862 Sharon, Wisconsin, US
- Died: March 12, 1947 (aged 84) Madison, Wisconsin, US
- Resting place: Graceland Cemetery, Racine, Wisconsin
- Party: Republican
- Spouses: Christina Lewis; (m. 1883; died 1896); Anne M. Lewis; (m. 1898; died 1930); Margaret Roche; (m. 1933)
- Children: 2
- Education: Lawrence University

Walter Samuel Goodland (December 22, 1862 – March 12, 1947) was an American lawyer and politician who served as the 31st governor of Wisconsin. He was a member of the Republican Party and attended Lawrence University in Appleton, Wisconsin.

== Biography ==
Goodland, born in Sharon, Wisconsin, was a lawyer and newspaper owner; he had owned a newspaper in Michigan in Iron Mountain. Goodland spent time on the Gogebic Range as a young man. He came to the range and began practicing law in Wakefield, Michigan. There he began the Wakefield Bulletin, one of the early daily newspapers of the range. Later, he established the Ironwood Times, disposing of it in May 1895 to Bennett and Green. The Ironwood Times continued to publish until May 1946. Goodland served in the Wisconsin State Senate. From 1911 to 1915, he was mayor of Racine, Wisconsin. From 1939 to 1943, Walter Goodland was the 29th Lieutenant Governor of Wisconsin.

In 1942, he was reelected lieutenant governor. On December 7, 1942, Governor-elect Orland Steen Loomis died before his inaugural. The Wisconsin Supreme Court ruled that Lieutenant Governor Goodland would serve Orland Loomis's term as governor, overriding the view of Governor Julius Heil that he should continue in office. Goodland was initially paid as the Lieutenant Governor, with a salary of $1,500 a year. He earned a six dollar daily bonus for being governor while the legislature was in session, and a five dollar daily bonus when it was not.

In 1944, Walter Goodland was elected Governor of Wisconsin in his own right, and in 1946 he was reelected. Walter Goodland died of a heart attack on Wednesday, March 12, 1947, while in office in Madison, Wisconsin, at age 84.

As of 2026, Goodland is the oldest individual to have served as governor of any state of the United States. He also had the distinction of both assuming and relinquishing the office of governor due to a death, the death of Loomis and his own.

== Honors ==
- Goodland Hall at Mendota Mental Health Institute was named for the governor.
- Walter Goodland Elementary School, Racine, Wisconsin was named in his honor.
- Goodland Park, one of Dane County's oldest parks, named for Wisconsin's oldest governor.

Party political offices
Preceded by Roland J. Steinle	Republican nominee for Lieutenant Governor of Wisconsin; 1938, 1940, 1942	Succeeded by Oscar Rennebohm
Preceded by Julius P. Heil	Republican nominee for Governor of Wisconsin; 1944, 1946	Succeeded by Oscar Rennebohm
Political offices
Preceded by Alex J. Horlick	Mayor of Racine, Wisconsin; 1911 – 1915	Succeeded by T. W. Thiesen
Preceded by Max W. Heck	Member of the Wisconsin State Senate from the 21st district 1927 – 1935	Succeeded by Joseph Clancy
Preceded by Herman Ekern	Lieutenant Governor of Wisconsin; 1939 – 1943	Succeeded by Oscar Rennebohm
Preceded by Orland Steen Loomis; Elect	Governor of Wisconsin; 1943 – 1947	Succeeded by Oscar Rennebohm
