= 1944 Wisconsin gubernatorial election =

- November 7, 1944
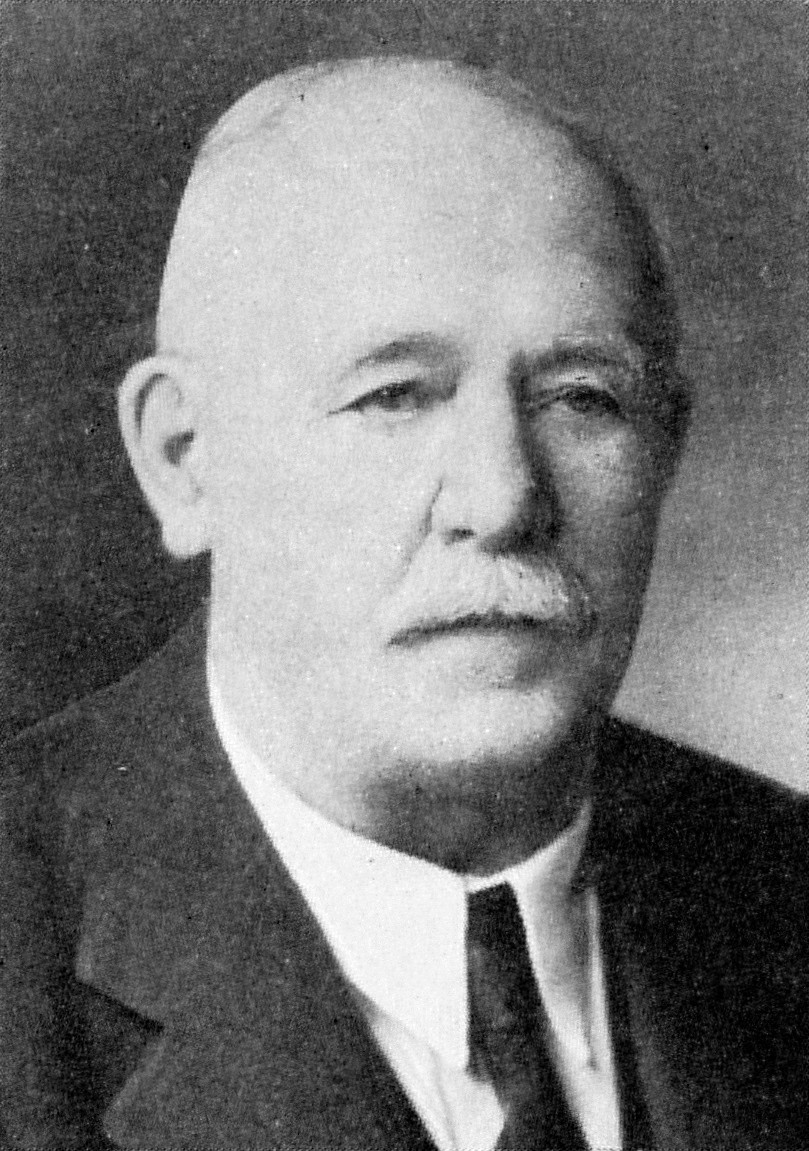

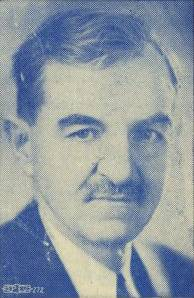

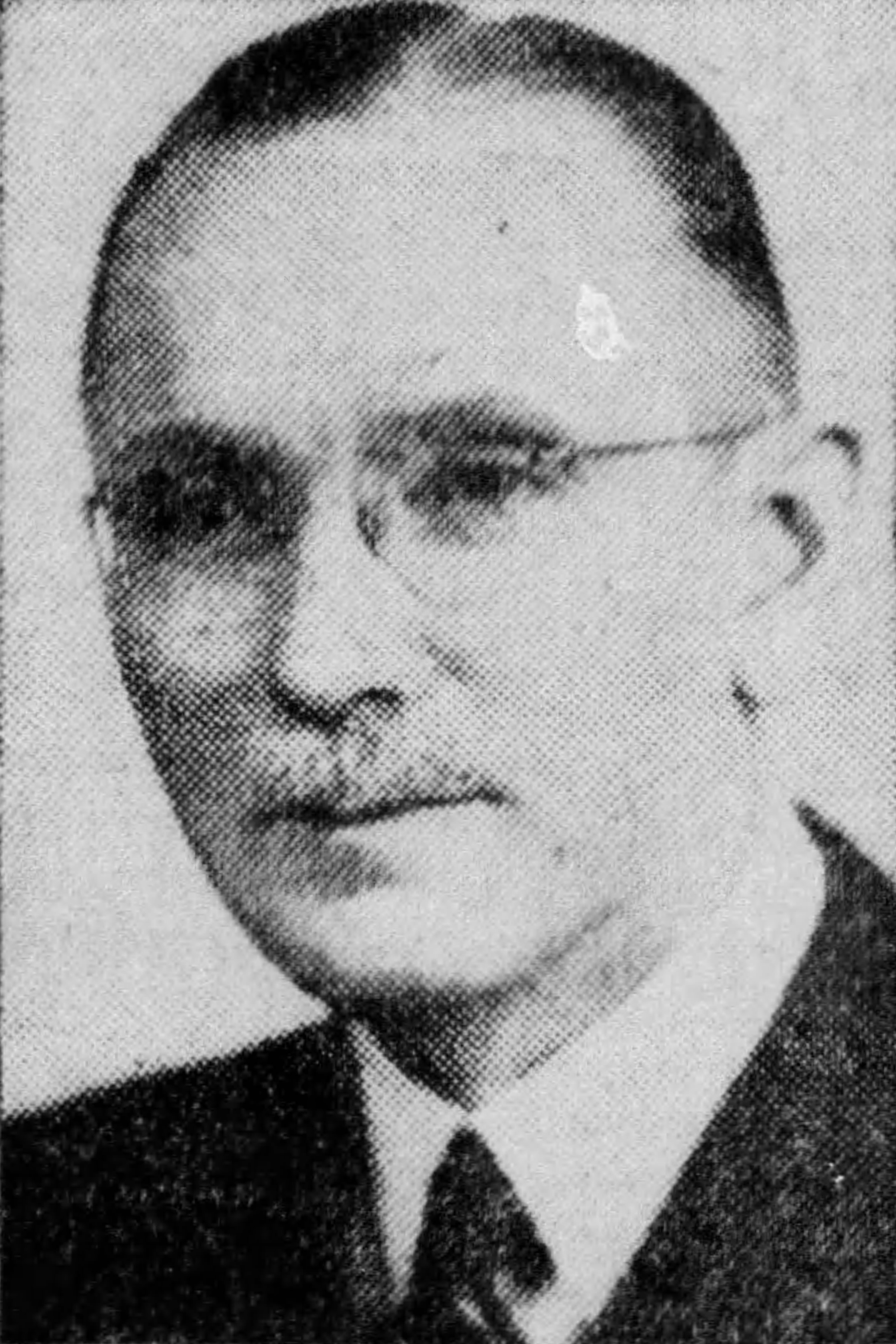
Nominee	Walter Samuel Goodland	Daniel Hoan	Alexander O. Benz
Party	Republican	Democratic	Progressive
Popular vote	697,740	536,357	76,028
Percentage	52.84%	40.62%	5.76%
- County results Goodland: 40–50% 50–60% 60–70% 70–80% Hoan: 40–50% 50–60% 60–70%
Governor before election
Walter Samuel Goodland
Republican
Elected Governor
Walter Samuel Goodland
Republican

The 1944 Wisconsin gubernatorial election was held on November 7, 1944. Primary elections were held on August 15, 1944.

Incumbent Republican Governor Walter Samuel Goodland defeated Democratic nominee Daniel Hoan with 52.84% of the vote.

== Republican primary ==
=== Candidates ===
==== Nominee ====
- Walter S. Goodland, incumbent lieutenant governor and acting governor

==== Eliminated in primary ====
- Roland E. Kannenberg, former State Senator
- Delbert J. Kenny, businessman
- Milton T. Murray, State Senator and unsuccessful candidate for Republican nomination for governor in 1942
- Christian J. Otjen, lawyer and soldier

=== Results ===
Republican primary results
Party	Candidate	Votes	%
Republican	Walter S. Goodland (inc.)	147,378	47.15%
Republican	Delbert J. Kenny	79,492	25.43%
Republican	Milton T. Murray	41,244	13.19%
Republican	Christian J. Otjen	29,004	9.28%
Republican	Roland E. Kannenberg	15,470	4.95%
Total votes		312,588	100.00%

== Democratic party ==
=== Candidates ===
==== Nominee ====
- Daniel Hoan, former mayor of Milwaukee

==== Eliminated in primary ====
- John N. Zimmermann, purchasing agent

=== Results ===
Democratic primary results
Party	Candidate	Votes	%
Democratic	Daniel W. Hoan	67,632	63.23%
Democratic	John N. Zimmermann	39,333	36.77%
Total votes		106,965	100.00%

== Progressive primary ==
=== Candidates ===
==== Nominee ====
- Alexander O. Benz, president of the Aid Association for Lutherans

==== Eliminated in primary ====
- Ralph F. Amoth
- John H. Kaiser, Progressive candidate for Secretary of State in 1942
- Leo E. Vaudreuil, former Deputy Attorney General of Wisconsin

=== Results ===
Progressive primary results
Party	Candidate	Votes	%
Progressive	Alexander O. Benz	9,448	33.13%
Progressive	Leo E. Vaudreuil	9,207	32.28%
Progressive	Ralph F. Amoth	5,691	19.95%
Progressive	John H. Kaiser	4,174	14.64%
Total votes		28,520	100.00%

== General election ==
=== Candidates ===
Major party candidates

- Walter Samuel Goodland, Republican
- Daniel Hoan, Democratic
- Alexander O. Benz, Progressive

Other candidates

- Georgia Cozzini, Socialist Labor, candidate for governor in 1942
- George A. Nelson, Social-Democratic, candidate for governor in 1934

=== Results ===
1944 Wisconsin gubernatorial election
Party	Candidate	Votes	%	±%
Republican	Walter S. Goodland (incumbent)	697,740	52.84%	+16.39%
Democratic	Daniel W. Hoan	536,357	40.62%	+28.36%
Progressive	Alexander O. Benz	76,028	5.76%	−43.89%
Social-Democratic	George A. Nelson	9,183	0.70%	−0.71%
Socialist Labor (Note: "Independent Socialist Labor")	Georgia Cozzini	1,122	0.08%	+0.02%
	Scattering	53	0.00%	
Majority		161,383	12.22%	
Total votes		1,320,483	100.00%	
Republican hold		Swing	+25.42%	

=== Results by county ===
County	Walter S. Goodland Republican		Daniel W. Hoan Democratic		Alexander O. Benz Progressive		All Others Various		Margin		Total votes cast
County	#	%	#	%	#	%	#	%	#	%	Total votes cast
Adams	1,769	61.62%	871	30.34%	207	7.21%	24	0.84%	898	31.28%	2,871
Ashland	3,638	47.66%	3,281	42.98%	684	8.96%	31	0.41%	357	4.68%	7,634
Barron	6,838	56.92%	2,854	23.76%	2,238	18.63%	84	0.70%	3,984	33.16%	12,014
Bayfield	2,778	49.10%	2,309	40.81%	531	9.38%	40	0.71%	469	8.29%	5,658
Brown	16,034	46.98%	16,039	47.00%	1,989	5.83%	66	0.19%	-5	-0.01%	34,128
Buffalo	3,524	70.83%	1,006	20.22%	395	7.94%	50	1.01%	2,518	50.61%	4,975
Burnett	2,123	55.42%	1,168	30.49%	493	12.87%	47	1.23%	955	24.93%	3,831
Calumet	5,047	67.46%	1,800	24.06%	616	8.23%	19	0.25%	3,247	43.40%	7,482
Chippewa	7,760	56.38%	4,321	31.39%	1,590	11.55%	93	0.68%	3,439	24.99%	13,764
Clark	6,990	57.91%	3,088	25.58%	1,935	16.03%	58	0.48%	3,902	32.33%	12,071
Columbia	9,451	68.45%	3,846	27.85%	478	3.46%	33	0.24%	5,605	40.59%	13,808
Crawford	4,488	63.48%	2,455	34.72%	109	1.54%	18	0.25%	2,033	28.76%	7,070
Dane	33,742	56.78%	21,357	35.94%	4,099	6.90%	226	0.38%	12,385	20.84%	59,424
Dodge	14,136	64.58%	6,132	28.01%	1,566	7.15%	55	0.25%	8,004	36.57%	21,889
Door	5,598	70.34%	1,902	23.90%	438	5.50%	20	0.25%	3,696	46.44%	7,958
Douglas	7,874	39.86%	9,035	45.73%	2,697	13.65%	150	0.76%	-1,161	-5.88%	19,756
Dunn	6,083	65.00%	2,219	23.71%	1,015	10.85%	41	0.44%	3,864	41.29%	9,358
Eau Claire	10,553	59.12%	5,411	30.31%	1,814	10.16%	72	0.40%	5,142	28.81%	17,850
Florence	792	51.13%	685	44.22%	55	3.55%	17	1.10%	107	6.91%	1,549
Fond du Lac	16,432	62.86%	8,111	31.03%	1,514	5.79%	85	0.33%	8,321	31.83%	26,142
Forest	1,268	34.53%	2,302	62.69%	96	2.61%	6	0.16%	-1,034	-28.16%	3,672
Grant	11,853	75.06%	3,570	22.61%	324	2.05%	44	0.28%	8,283	52.45%	15,791
Green	7,065	75.31%	2,045	21.80%	249	2.65%	22	0.23%	5,020	53.51%	9,381
Green Lake	4,802	72.11%	1,581	23.74%	259	3.89%	17	0.26%	3,221	48.37%	6,659
Iowa	6,015	73.64%	1,911	23.40%	221	2.71%	21	0.26%	4,104	50.24%	8,168
Iron	1,314	34.62%	2,322	61.17%	142	3.74%	18	0.47%	-1,008	-26.55%	3,796
Jackson	3,542	61.16%	1,243	21.46%	989	17.08%	17	0.29%	2,299	39.70%	5,791
Jefferson	10,882	63.53%	5,308	30.99%	894	5.22%	44	0.26%	5,574	32.54%	17,128
Juneau	4,811	65.64%	1,905	25.99%	592	8.08%	21	0.29%	2,906	39.65%	7,329
Kenosha	11,543	37.70%	17,487	57.11%	1,335	4.36%	255	0.83%	-5,944	-19.41%	30,620
Kewaunee	3,673	56.39%	2,252	34.58%	564	8.66%	24	0.37%	1,421	21.82%	6,513
La Crosse	14,531	59.04%	8,086	32.85%	1,953	7.93%	44	0.18%	6,445	26.18%	24,614
Lafayette	5,559	68.89%	2,356	29.20%	142	1.76%	12	0.15%	3,203	39.70%	8,069
Langlade	3,853	47.39%	3,854	47.40%	394	4.85%	30	0.37%	-1	-0.01%	8,131
Lincoln	5,304	62.40%	2,180	25.65%	936	11.01%	80	0.94%	3,124	36.75%	8,500
Manitowoc	12,456	47.86%	10,940	42.04%	2,524	9.70%	104	0.40%	1,516	5.83%	26,024
Marathon	15,538	53.60%	10,328	35.63%	2,864	9.88%	259	0.89%	5,210	17.97%	28,989
Marinette	7,419	56.13%	5,433	41.10%	323	2.44%	43	0.33%	1,986	15.02%	13,218
Marquette	2,902	76.51%	720	18.98%	166	4.38%	5	0.13%	2,182	57.53%	3,793
Milwaukee	140,914	39.42%	201,343	56.33%	9,730	2.72%	5,462	1.53%	-60,429	-16.91%	357,449
Monroe	7,940	70.71%	2,602	23.17%	622	5.54%	65	0.58%	5,338	47.54%	11,229
Oconto	5,879	57.28%	3,746	36.50%	596	5.81%	43	0.42%	2,133	20.78%	10,264
Oneida	3,636	50.90%	3,231	45.23%	226	3.16%	50	0.70%	405	5.67%	7,143
Outagamie	13,947	49.60%	6,943	24.69%	7,151	25.43%	80	0.28%	6,796 (Note: Goodland's margin over Benz)	24.17%	28,121
Ozaukee	5,677	62.23%	3,016	33.06%	382	4.19%	48	0.53%	2,661	29.17%	9,123
Pepin	2,101	75.85%	511	18.45%	138	4.98%	20	0.72%	1,590	57.40%	2,770
Pierce	5,578	72.76%	1,654	21.58%	396	5.17%	38	0.50%	3,924	51.19%	7,666
Polk	5,537	58.84%	2,286	24.29%	1,310	13.92%	277	2.94%	3,251	34.55%	9,410
Portage	6,066	43.80%	7,382	53.30%	333	2.40%	68	0.49%	-1,316	-9.50%	13,849
Price	3,205	48.25%	2,925	44.03%	455	6.85%	58	0.87%	280	4.21%	6,643
Racine	17,679	39.72%	25,746	57.84%	897	2.02%	192	0.43%	-8,067	-18.12%	44,514
Richland	5,862	73.48%	1,962	24.59%	116	1.45%	38	0.48%	3,900	48.88%	7,978
Rock	21,175	60.57%	12,794	36.60%	918	2.63%	70	0.20%	8,381	23.98%	34,957
Rusk	3,456	55.38%	2,495	39.98%	267	4.28%	23	0.37%	961	15.40%	6,241
Sauk	10,851	71.64%	3,724	24.59%	490	3.24%	81	0.53%	7,127	47.06%	15,146
Sawyer	2,359	56.07%	1,504	35.75%	311	7.39%	33	0.78%	855	20.32%	4,207
Shawano	8,277	65.37%	2,939	23.21%	1,395	11.02%	50	0.39%	5,338	42.16%	12,661
Sheboygan	14,981	47.67%	14,190	45.15%	1,755	5.58%	502	1.60%	791	2.52%	31,428
St. Croix	6,744	65.90%	3,014	29.45%	428	4.18%	48	0.47%	3,730	36.45%	10,234
Taylor	3,330	51.40%	2,536	39.14%	417	6.44%	196	3.03%	794	12.25%	6,479
Trempealeau	5,244	62.71%	1,957	23.40%	1,139	13.62%	22	0.26%	3,287	39.31%	8,362
Vernon	7,067	66.15%	2,950	27.61%	642	6.01%	24	0.22%	4,117	38.54%	10,683
Vilas	1,822	45.19%	2,090	51.84%	105	2.60%	15	0.37%	-268	-6.65%	4,032
Walworth	12,240	74.33%	3,817	23.18%	362	2.20%	47	0.29%	8,423	51.15%	16,466
Washburn	2,316	54.19%	1,515	35.45%	413	9.66%	30	0.70%	801	18.74%	4,274
Washington	8,695	68.07%	3,420	26.77%	635	4.97%	24	0.19%	5,275	41.29%	12,774
Waukesha	19,112	61.34%	11,014	35.35%	872	2.80%	162	0.52%	8,098	25.99%	31,160
Waupaca	11,104	72.64%	2,700	17.66%	1,443	9.44%	40	0.26%	8,404	54.97%	15,287
Waushara	4,755	79.10%	972	16.17%	260	4.33%	24	0.40%	3,783	62.93%	6,011
Winnebago	19,893	61.56%	10,601	32.80%	1,651	5.11%	172	0.53%	9,292	28.75%	32,317
Wood	10,318	63.74%	5,065	31.29%	743	4.59%	61	0.38%	5,253	32.45%	16,187
Total	697,740	52.84%	536,357	40.62%	76,028	5.76%	10,358	0.78%	161,383	12.22%	1,320,483

==== Counties that flipped from Progressive to Republican ====
- Adams
- Ashland
- Barron
- Bayfield
- Buffalo
- Burnett
- Chippewa
- Clark
- Columbia
- Dane
- Dodge
- Door
- Dunn
- Eau Claire
- Grant
- Green
- Iowa
- Jackson
- Jefferson
- Juneau
- La Crosse
- Lincoln
- Manitowoc
- Marathon
- Monroe
- Oconto
- Oneida
- Ozaukee
- Pierce
- Polk
- Richland
- Rock
- Rusk
- Sauk
- St. Croix
- Taylor
- Trempealeau
- Vernon
- Washburn
- Waukesha
- Waupaca
- Wooda

==== Counties that flipped from Progressive to Democratic ====
- Brown
- Douglas
- Forest
- Iron
- Langlade
- Milwaukee
- Portage
- Racine
- Vilas

==== Counties that flipped from Republican to Democratic ====
- Kenosha

== Bibliography ==
- Gubernatorial Elections, 1787–1997. Washington, D.C.: Congressional Quarterly Inc. 1998. ISBN 1-56802-396-0.
- Ohm, Howard F.; Kuehn, Hazel L., eds. (1946). The Wisconsin Blue Book, 1946. State of Wisconsin.
