= Jerome L. Blaska =

American politician

Jerome L. Blaska (July 4, 1919 – May 2, 2000) was a member of the Wisconsin State Assembly.

== Biography ==
Blaska was born on July 4, 1919, in Sun Prairie, Wisconsin to John M. Blaska and Rose Schuster Blaska. His father, John, was also a member of the Assembly. During World War II, he served in the United States Army in the Aleutian Islands. Blaska later became a member of the Veterans of Foreign Wars and the American Legion. In 1948, he married Helen Curl. They had six children, two of whom became supervisors of Dane County, Wisconsin. Blaska died on May 2, 2000. He was Roman Catholic.

== Political career ==
Blaska was elected to the Assembly in 1959 and was re-elected in 1960, 1962, and 1964. In addition, he was a member of the Sun Prairie School Board. He was a Democrat.
