= Oscar Rennebohm =

American politician (1889–1968)

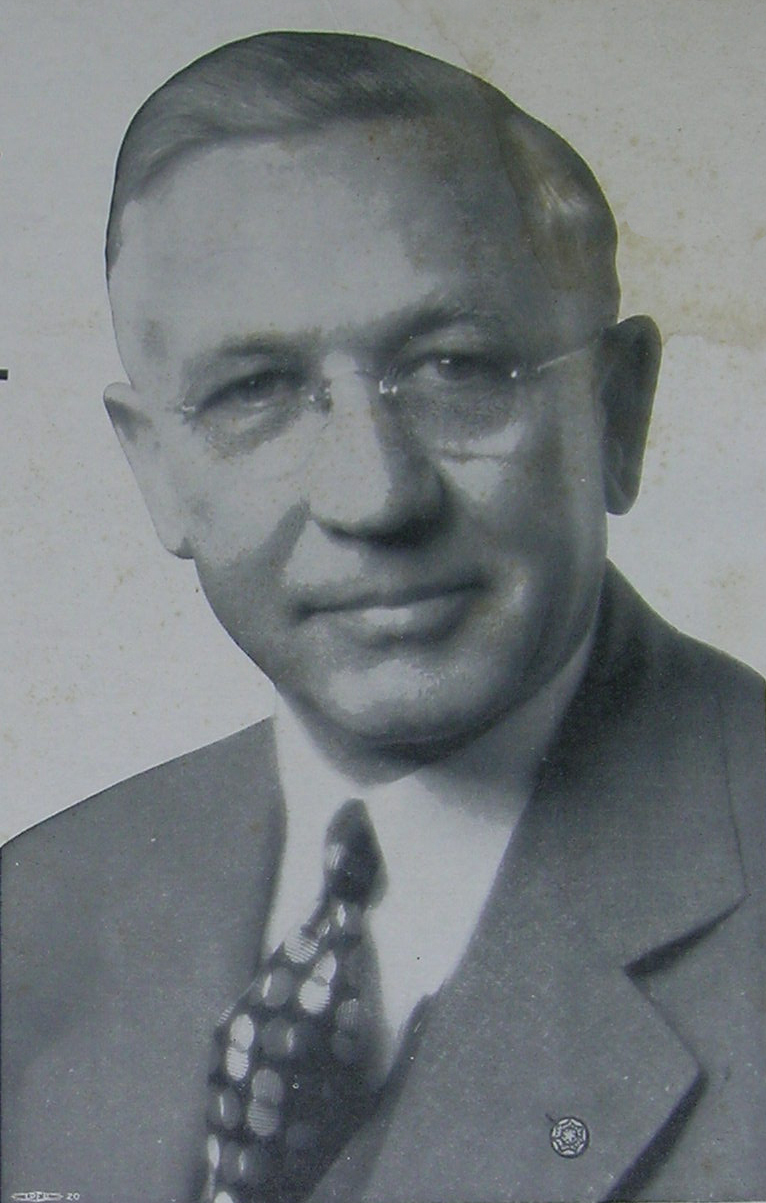

32nd Governor of Wisconsin
- In office January 3, 1949 – January 1, 1951; Acting: March 12, 1947 – January 3, 1949
- Lieutenant: George M. Smith
- Preceded by: Walter Samuel Goodland
- Succeeded by: Walter J. Kohler Jr.

30th Lieutenant Governor of Wisconsin
- In office January 4, 1943 – March 12, 1947
- Governor: Walter Samuel Goodland
- Preceded by: Walter Samuel Goodland
- Succeeded by: George M. Smith

Personal details
- Born: May 25, 1889 Leeds, Wisconsin, U.S.
- Died: October 15, 1968 (aged 79) Madison, Wisconsin, U.S.
- Resting place: Forest Hill Cemetery; Madison, Wisconsin
- Party: Republican
- Spouse: Mary Fowler (m. 1920)
- Children: 1
- Education: University of Wisconsin
- Profession: Pharmacist; Politician

Military service
- Branch/service: United States Navy
- Rank: Ensign
- Battles/wars: World War I

Oscar Rennebohm (May 25, 1889 – October 15, 1968) was an American politician and pharmacist who served as the 32nd governor of Wisconsin. He previously served as lieutenant governor and assumed the office of governor in 1947 on the death of Governor Walter S. Goodland.

== Early life ==
Born in Leeds, Wisconsin, in Columbia County, Rennebohm moved with his family to Milwaukee, Wisconsin, when he was ten. He graduated from the University of Wisconsin in 1911, after which he worked as a pharmacist and, in 1912, he founded Rennebohm Drug Stores under a Rexall franchise. He was vice-president of the American Pharmaceutical Association, president of the Wisconsin Pharmaceutical Association and a member of the Board of Regents of the University of Wisconsin.

== Career ==
During World War I, he attended officer candidate school and was commissioned an ensign in the United States Navy.

In 1945, Rennebohm was elected the 30th Lieutenant Governor of Wisconsin. When Governor Walter Goodland died shortly after his third term began, Rennebohm succeeded him, winning election to the governorship in 1948. During his tenure as governor, Rennebohm began a veterans' housing program financed by an increased liquor tax. In 1949, he founded the Rennebohm Foundation, which supports education in the Madison area. The school of pharmacy at the University of Wisconsin–Madison is named after Rennebohm. Additionally, Rennebohm Park, located near the Hill Farms area, is also named after Rennebohm.

== Death ==
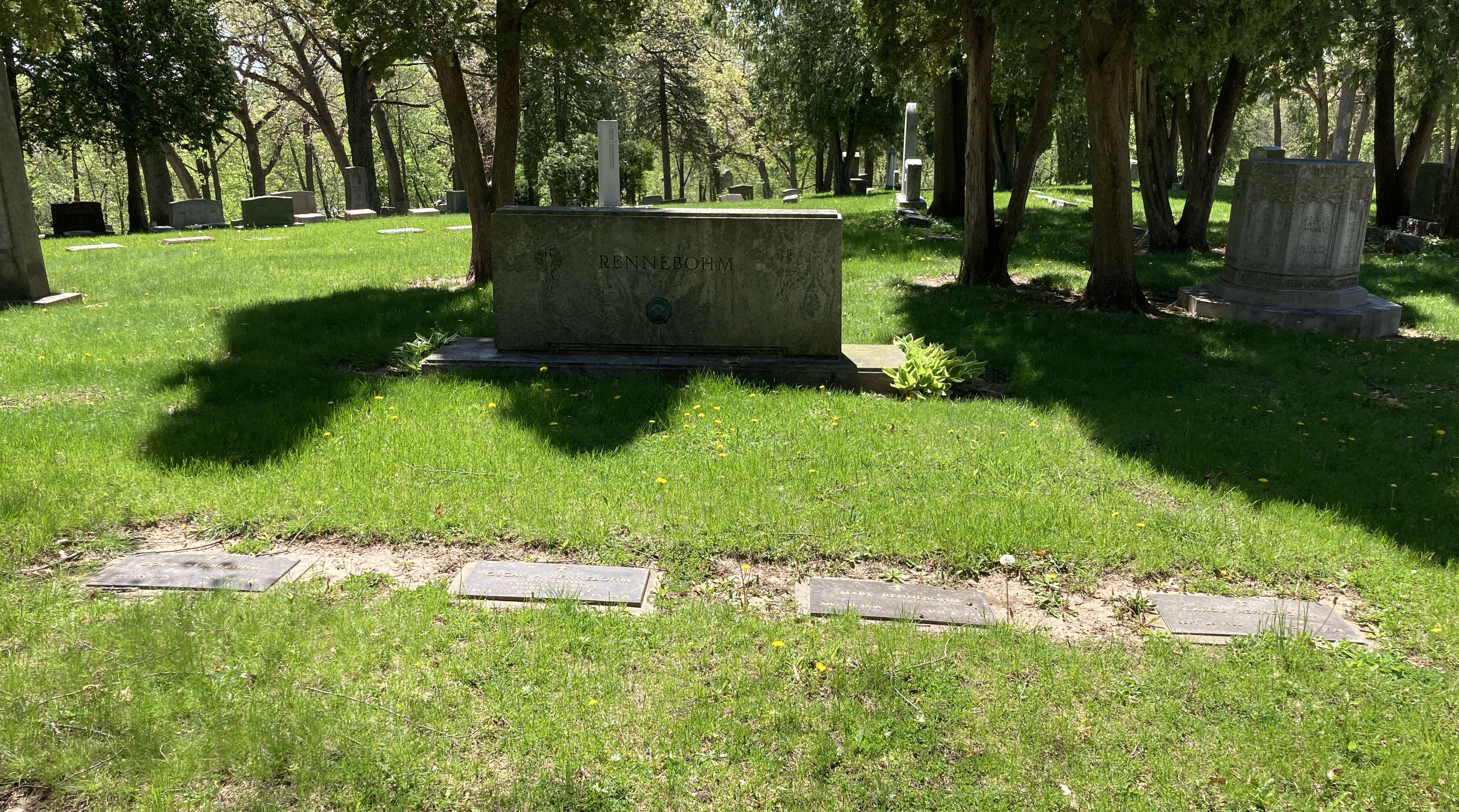
Rennebohm's grave at Forest Hill Cemetery

Rennebohm retired and died in Madison, Wisconsin, on October 15, 1968 (age 79 years, 143 days). He is interred at Forest Hill Cemetery, Madison, Wisconsin.

== Family life ==
Son of William Carl and Julia Brandt Rennebohm, he married Mary Fowler on September 8, 1920, and they had one daughter, Carol Ann.

Party political offices
| Preceded by Walter Samuel Goodland | Republican nominee for Lieutenant Governor of Wisconsin; 1944, 1946 | Succeeded by George M. Smith |
| Preceded by Walter Samuel Goodland | Republican nominee for Governor of Wisconsin; 1948 | Succeeded by Walter J. Kohler Jr. |
Political offices
| Preceded by Walter Samuel Goodland | Lieutenant Governor of Wisconsin; 1945–1947 | Succeeded by George M. Smith |
| Preceded by Walter Samuel Goodland | Governor of Wisconsin; 1947–1951 | Succeeded by Walter J. Kohler Jr. |
