= 1942 Wisconsin lieutenant gubernatorial election =

- November 3, 1942
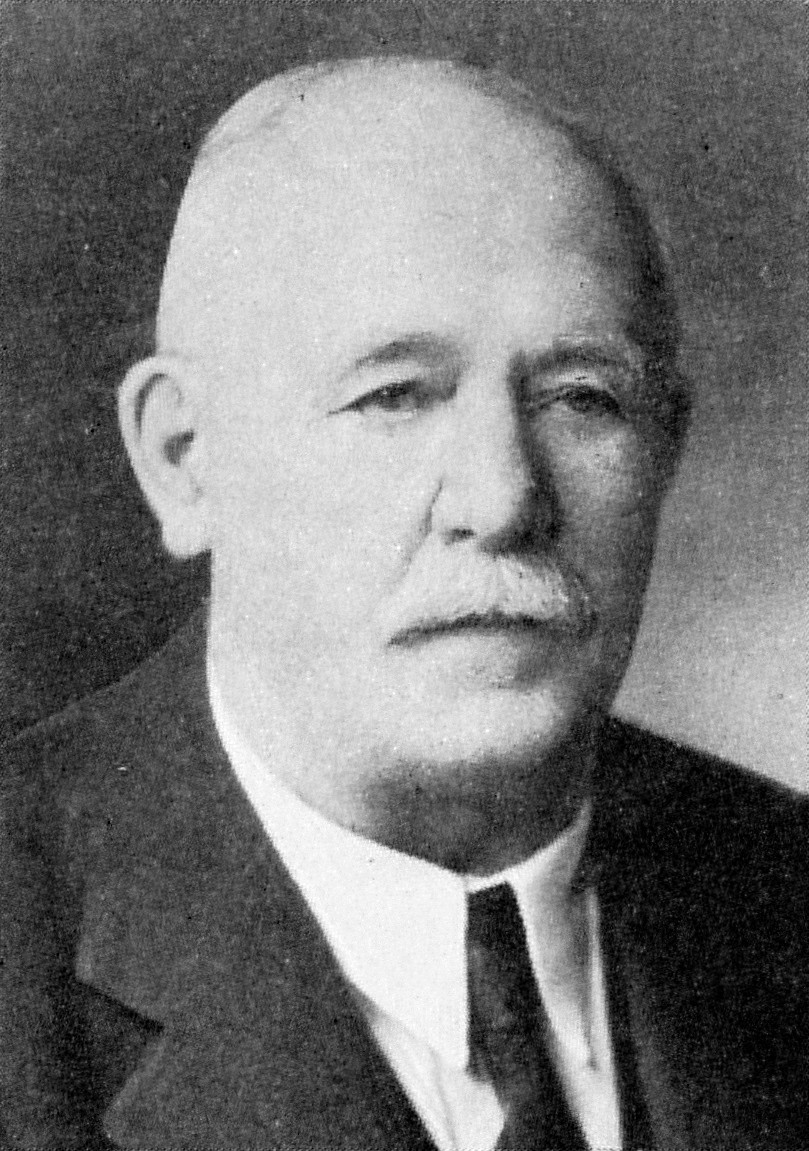

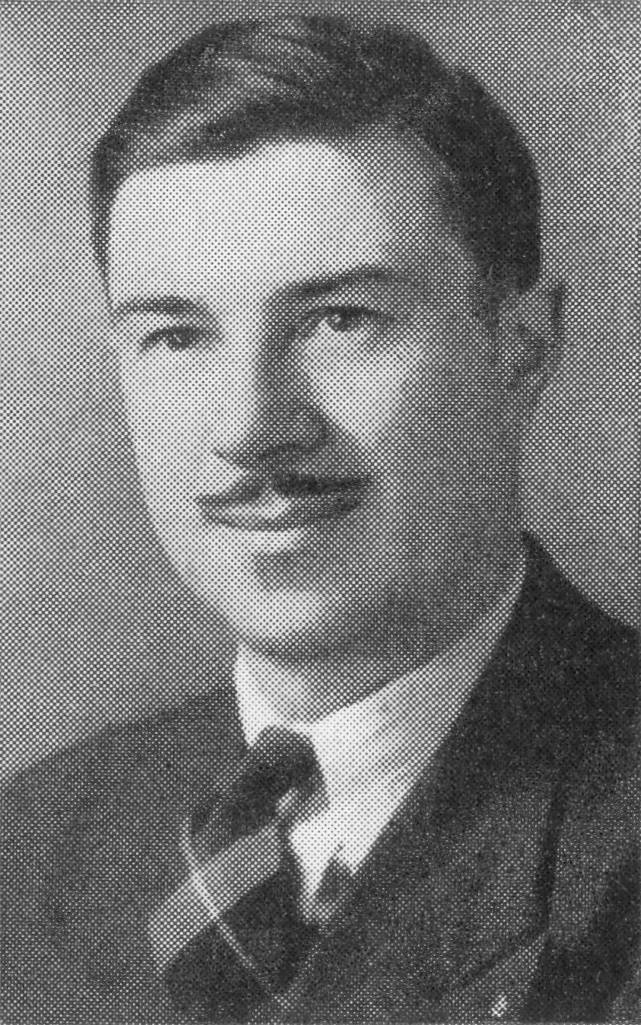

Nominee	Walter Samuel Goodland	Henry J. Berquist	John M. Brophy
Party	Republican	Progressive	Democratic
Popular vote	349,230	256,851	119,926
Percentage	47.34%	34.82%	16.26%
- County results Goodland: 30–40% 40–50% 50–60% 60–70% 70–80% Berquist: 40–50% 50–60% 60–70% Brophy: 40–50%
Lieutenant Governor before election
Walter Samuel Goodland
Republican
Elected Lieutenant Governor
Walter Samuel Goodland
Republican

The 1942 Wisconsin lieutenant gubernatorial election was held on November 3, 1942. Incumbent Walter Goodland was re-elected to another term, defeating Progressive Henry Berquist and Democrat John Brophy.

This race was notable due to the death of governor elect Orland Steen Loomis, and the ensuing court battle over who would hold office in his stead. The Wisconsin Supreme Court ruled that Lieutenant Governor Walter Samuel Goodland would be acting governor for the duration of Loomis' term, overriding the view of incumbent Governor Julius Heil that he should continue his term in office.

== Republican primary ==
=== Candidates ===
==== Nominee ====
- Walter Samuel Goodland, incumbent Lieutenant Governor

==== Eliminated in primary ====
- Charles I. Wesley, industrialist

=== Results ===
Republican primary results
Party	Candidate	Votes	%
Republican	Walter Samuel Goodland (incumbent)	154,695	66.34
Republican	Charles I. Wesley	78,474	33.66
Total votes		233,169	100.00

== Progressive Primary ==
=== Candidates ===
==== Nominee ====
- Philip E. Nelson, State Senator (withdrew)

==== Eliminated in primary ====
- Henry J. Berquist, Wisconsin State Assembly member

=== Results ===
Progressive primary results
Party	Candidate	Votes	%
Progressive	Philip E. Nelson	36,584	71.98
Progressive	Henry J. Berquist	13,240	28.02
Total votes		50,824	100.00

=== Aftermath ===
In the September Primary, Nelson won with a commanding 71% of the vote. Nelson, however, had already been appointed to the federal War Production Board and, on the eve of the Progressive Party state convention, declined the nomination. On October 5, the Progressives formally nominated Henry Berquist in place of Nelson.

== Democratic primary ==
=== Nominee ===
- John M. Brophy, unsuccessful candidate for Wisconsin State Assembly in 1940

=== Results ===
Democratic primary results
Party	Candidate	Votes	%
Democratic	John M. Brophy	52,952	100.00
Total votes		52,952	100.00

== Other party nominations ==
- Adolf Wiggert, Independent Socialist Labor, perennial candidate
- Arthur C. Ochsner, Social-Democratic

== General election ==
=== Results ===
1942 Wisconsin lieutenant gubernatorial election
Party	Candidate	Votes	%	±%
Republican	Walter Samuel Goodland (incumbent)	349,230	47.34%	
Progressive	Henry J. Berquist	256,851	34.82%	
Democratic	John M. Brophy	119,926	16.26%	
Social-Democratic	Arthur C. Ochsner	10,372	1.41%	
Independent Socialist Labor	Adolf Wiggert	1,336	0.18%	
Majority		92,379	12.52%	
Turnout		737,715	100.00%	
Republican hold		Swing		
