= Communist Party of Wisconsin =

- Founded: 1919
- Split from: Socialist Party of Wisconsin
- Ideology: Communism
- Political position: Far-left
- National affiliation: Communist Party USA
- Colors: Red
- State Senate: 0 / 33
- State Assembly: 0 / 99

The Communist Party of Wisconsin is a Communist party in Wisconsin and is a state affiliate of the Communist Party of the United States of America (CPUSA).

== History ==
The Communist Party of Wisconsin was founded in 1919, due to heightened factionalism within the Socialist Party of Wisconsin caused by the Russian Revolution and the founding of the Russian Soviet Socialist Republic. Fred Basset Blair severed as chairman of the party non-consecutively and ran in gubernatorial elections in 1930, 1932, 1940 and 1942. The party often cooperated with the Congress of Industrial Organizations (CIO) involving itself in the labor movement in the state of Wisconsin, partaking in the organization and support of trade unions.

During the Cold War with the onset of the second red scare the party became a subject of anti-communist political repression resulting in communist dominated trade unions being expelled from the CIO. investigations began being held in Milwaukee by the House Committee on Un-American Activities which targeted suspected communists and active members of the party. Fred Blair would run again for governor of Wisconsin in the 1974, gubernatorial election.
