= Henry J. Berquist =

American politician from Wisconsin (1905–1990)

Henry Berquist
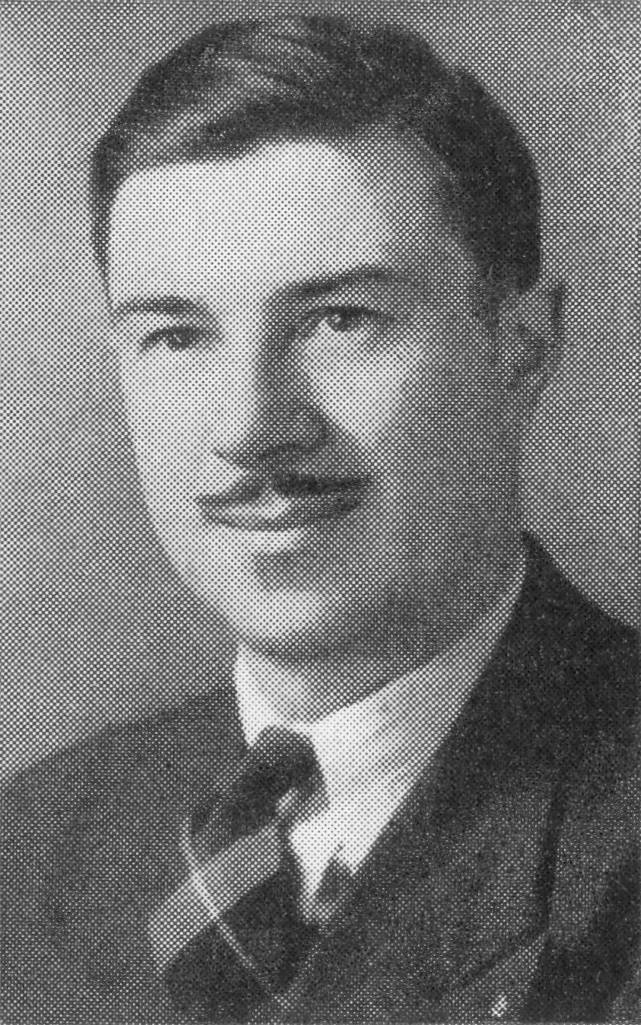
- Berquist c. 1940

Chairman of the Wisconsin Progressive Party
- In office April 1948 – January 1949
- Preceded by: Party established
- Succeeded by: Party abolished

Member of the Wisconsin State Assembly from the Florence–Forest–Oneida district
- In office January 4, 1937 – November 24, 1942
- Preceded by: Herman L. Kronschnabl
- Succeeded by: Walter S. Fisher

Personal details
- Born: Henry Joseph Berquist; February 26, 1905 Minneapolis, Minnesota, U.S.
- Died: May 1, 1990 (aged 85) Silver City, New Mexico, U.S.
- Resting place: Fort Bayard National Cemetery; Fort Bayard, New Mexico
- Party: Democratic (1946; after 1948); Progressive (1948); Wisc. Progressive (1936–1946); Socialist (1934)
- Spouses: Frances M. Emmerich; (died 1978); Leona Schoeneck; (died 2002)
- Children: James Berquist^{(b. 1928; died 2018)}; Frances Berquist^{(b. 1928; died 1928)}; Eloise Volkert^{(step-daughter)}

Military service
- Allegiance: United States
- Branch/service: United States Army
- Years of service: 1942–1945
- Rank: Sergeant
- Battles/wars: World War II; Western Front; Battle of the Bulge
- Awards: Purple Heart; Good Conduct Medal; ETO Campaign Medal

Henry Joseph Berquist (February 26, 1905 – May 1, 1990) was an American politician. He served three terms in the Wisconsin State Assembly (1937–1942) representing Florence, Forest, and Oneida counties as a member of the Wisconsin Progressive Party. He resigned to serve in World War II and was wounded and captured at the Battle of the Bulge. After the war he was a candidate for Governor of Wisconsin in 1948 for Henry A. Wallace's Progressive Party, but was not elected. In his later years he became a staunch Democrat and advocated for senior issues.

== Early life ==
Born in Minneapolis, Minnesota, he was educated there. He moved to Wisconsin and became actively involved in the fur farming industry; he was a national organizer and vice president of the American fur Growers Association and worked as a cartoonist for their monthly magazine. In 1934, he attended the Farm and Labor College at Tomahawk and he was employed as superintendent and labor foreman for the Northlands Packing Company in Rhinelander.

== Elected office ==
Also in 1934, Berquist made his first attempt at elected office when he ran for Wisconsin State Assembly, challenging incumbent Democrat Neil McEachin in the Florence–Forest–Oneida assembly district. McEachin also faced a primary challenge that year after coming into significant conflict with his own party due to a dispute with Governor Albert G. Schmedeman—also a Democrat—over conflicting plans for state controls of alcohol law following the Repeal of Prohibition in the United States. Berquist ran as a Socialist and came in a distant fourth in the general election.

The seat went to Wisconsin Progressive candidate Herman L. Kronschnabl, but only two years later Kronschnabl announced that he would forgo re-election in favor of running for a seat in the Wisconsin State Senate. Berquist decided to run again, this time seeking the Progressive Party nomination. Four candidates ultimately ran in the Progressive primary election. Berquist won a narrow victory for the nomination with 33% of the primary vote—taking roughly the same number of votes he had received in the 1934 general election. Berquist was subsequently re-elected in 1938 and 1940.

In the Assembly, Berquist rose to junior floor leader for the Progressive caucus and was appointed secretary of the special joint investigative committee on land utilization in the northern area of the state.

In 1942, Berquist declared his candidacy for Lieutenant Governor of Wisconsin on the Wisconsin Progressive ticket, while strongly endorsing the economic policies and war policies of the Roosevelt administration. In the Progressive Party primary, he faced state senator Philip E. Nelson, a former Republican who represented the northwest corner of the state. In the September Primary, Nelson won with a commanding 71% of the vote. Nelson, however, had already been appointed to the federal War Production Board and, on the eve of the Progressive Party state convention, declined the nomination. On October 5, the Progressives formally nominated Henry Berquist in place of Nelson.

In the general election, Berquist was defeated by incumbent Lieutenant Governor Walter Samuel Goodland. This would prove to be a fateful election, as the winner of the gubernatorial election, Progressive Orland Steen Loomis, died of a heart attack a month before taking office, leaving the Republican Goodland to be sworn in as Governor.

== World War II service ==
Prior to the Attack on Pearl Harbor, the Progressive Party had a staunch non-interventionist policy and insisted that America's best strategy in this era was to build up domestic strength. Berquist, during his time in the Assembly, was considered a staunch pacifist and isolationist—at one point he supported a bill to ban toy soldiers and toy guns, saying that perhaps removing some of the glamor from war for children would reduce the likelihood of future wars. However, just weeks after his defeat in the 1942 election, Berquist resigned his Assembly seat and enlisted in the United States Army for service in World War II. Despite being nearly 38 years old, Berquist entered service as a private and was stationed at Fort Riley, Kansas, with the 52nd Armored Infantry Regiment, 9th Armored Division. While at Fort Riley, he wrote to his teenage son explaining the reasons for his absence and his rationale for the war in a widely reprinted letter. He rose to the rank of corporal by spring of 1943, and trained with his regiment throughout the year in California, Missouri, and Louisiana. He was promoted to sergeant in the summer of 1944.

Following the Normandy landings, he and his division were deployed to England in August and landed in Normandy in September. They were first assigned to the front in late October, during the Allied advance from Paris to the Rhine. Berquist was stationed in Luxembourg when the German counter-offensive struck in the December 1944 Battle of the Bulge and was taken prisoner during the fighting. He was first reported missing December 18, 1944, but was not known to be in captivity until April 1945, when he was allowed to write to his wife to inform her of his situation. Berquist was held at a German prisoner-of-war camp until May 1945, when the camp was liberated by General George S. Patton's Third Army. He was awarded the Purple Heart, the Good Conduct Medal, the European Theatre Campaign Medal with two battle stars, Combat Infantryman Badge, and a Presidential Unit Citation.

== Postwar campaigns ==
Berquist returned to Wisconsin in June 1945 and addressed sessions of the Wisconsin Senate and Assembly on his war experience. He spoke about the atrocities of the Germans, encouraged them to support veterans of the war, and gave an exhortation that there must be "no breakdown of democracy in the United States."

In 1946, the Wisconsin Progressive Party, which had been Berquist's political home since 1936, voted to dissolve and return to the Wisconsin Republican Party with the goal of shifting that party toward a more progressive policy agenda. The move was led by longtime Progressive United States Senator Robert M. La Follette Jr., who saw unification with the Republican Party as his only path to re-election. Berquist, at the convention, instead spoke in favor of the Progressives joining with the Democratic Party; a week later, he announced he would seek the Democratic nomination for the United States House of Representatives in Wisconsin's 10th congressional district. Berquist announced his candidacy in an open letter to Senator La Follette in which he explained that Roosevelt, Truman, and Wallace were far more aligned with the Progressive Party's ideals than the Republicans. He accused La Follette of aligning himself with the party of reactionaries and subordinating the ideals of the party to his own ambitions. La Follette went on to lose the Republican nomination to Joseph McCarthy, and Berquist was defeated in the general election by incumbent Alvin O'Konski.

Following his defeat, Berquist became involved in the newly reorganized national Progressive Party, which had been formed around former Roosevelt Vice President Henry A. Wallace. Berquist became the Wisconsin campaign director for Wallace's 1948 presidential campaign. At the Wisconsin convention which established the new party in the state, Berquist was named chairman, although a significant schism quickly emerged with delegates walking out and accusing the party of being driven by communists. In July 1948, Berquist announced his candidacy for Governor on the new party's ticket. In his announcement, he asserted that Wallace and the new Progressive Party were the true heirs to Roosevelt and the New Deal which he said was being derailed and reversed by the efforts of Southern Democrats and "northern big city political machines." He pointed to the emerging crisis of the new Cold War and the nuclear arms race, the resultant massive expansion of defense spending, the resumption of the military draft, new curbs on labor rights, price inflation, abrogation of civil rights for African Americans and political minorities, and a housing crisis. "Control of the Republican and Democratic parties alike," he alleged, "has passed into the hands of the economic royalists." Berquist came in a distant 3rd in the gubernatorial election, earning just 1% of the vote. Wallace also did not win a single electoral vote.

Following the 1948 election, the Wisconsin branch of the Progressive Party quickly dissolved. Berquist ran for office three more times as a Democrat, running for the Assembly in 1956 and 1958, and for Wisconsin State Senate in 1960. But did not hold a state legislative office again.

In the late 1960s, he served on the Oneida County Board of Supervisors and as chairman of the town of Pelican, Wisconsin, and was, for several years, chairman of the Oneida County Democratic Party. In 1975, he was appointed to the State Board on Aging by Governor Patrick Lucey, serving until 1979.

In 1982, Berquist moved to New Mexico, fully retired, where he died in 1990. He was interred at New Mexico's Fort Bayard National Cemetery in a ceremony with full military honors.

== Personal life and family ==
Berquist was married twice. With his first wife, Frances, he had a son, James, and a daughter, Frances, though their daughter died in infancy in 1928. While Berquist was at war in 1944, Frances ran unsuccessfully for Wisconsin State Assembly in his former assembly district on the Progressive ticket. Frances died in 1978.

He later married Leona Schoeneck and became stepfather to her daughter, Eloise Volkert.

After serving in the war, Berquist was a member of the American Legion, the Veterans of Foreign Wars, and Military Order of the Purple Heart.

== Electoral history ==
=== Wisconsin Assembly (1934) ===
Wisconsin Assembly, Florence–Forest–Oneida District Election, 1934
Party	Candidate	Votes	%	±%
General Election, November 6, 1934
Progressive	Herman L. Kronschnabl	3,884	36.89%	
Democratic	Neil McEachin (incumbent)	3,638	34.55%	−19.74%
Republican	Alex McRae	2,342	22.24%	−23.46%
Socialist	Henry J. Berquist	665	6.32%	
Plurality		246	2.34%	-6.25%
Total votes		10,529	100.0%	-1.47%
Progressive gain from Democratic				

=== Wisconsin Lieutenant Governor (1942) ===
Wisconsin Lieutenant Gubernatorial Election, 1942
Party	Candidate	Votes	%	±%
Progressive Primary, September 15, 1942
Progressive	Philip E. Nelson (declined nomination)	36,584	71.98%	
Progressive	Henry J. Berquist	14,240	28.02%	
Plurality		22,344	43.96%	
Total votes		50,824	100.0%	
General Election, November 3, 1942
Republican	Walter Samuel Goodland (incumbent)	349,230	47.34%	−3.78%
Progressive	Henry J. Berquist	256,851	34.82%	+10.50%
Democratic	John M. Brophy	119,926	16.26%	−8.06%
Socialist	Arthur C. Ochsner	10,372	1.41%	
Socialist Labor	Adolf Wiggert	1,336	0.18%	−0.06%
Plurality		92,379	12.52%	-14.28%
Total votes		737,715	100.0%	-34.53%
Republican hold				

=== U.S. House of Representatives (1946) ===
Wisconsin's 10th Congressional District Election, 1946
Party	Candidate	Votes	%	±%
General Election, November 5, 1946
Republican	Alvin O'Konski (incumbent)	40,263	52.98%	−4.83%
Democratic	Henry J. Berquist	32,238	42.42%	+10.97%
Independent	Eugene R. Princeton	2,973	3.91%	
Socialist	Adolph F. Kreie	529	0.70%	−0.05%
Plurality		8,025	10.56%	-15.80%
Total votes		76,003	100.0%	-19.73%
Republican hold				

=== Wisconsin Governor (1948) ===
Wisconsin Gubernatorial Election, 1948
Party	Candidate	Votes	%	±%
Republican	Oscar Rennebohm (incumbent)	684,839	54.09%	−5.69%
Democratic	Carl W. Thompson	558,497	44.11%	+5.04%
Progressive	Henry J. Berquist	12,928	1.02%	
Socialist	Walter H. Uphoff	9,149	0.72%	−0.14%
Socialist Workers	James E. Boulton	356	0.03%	−0.15%
Socialist Labor	Georgia Cozzini	328	0.03%	−0.07%
	Scattering	42	0.00%	
Plurality		126,342	9.98%	-10.73%
Total votes		1,266,139	100.0%	+21.69%
Republican hold				

=== Wisconsin Senate (1960) ===
Wisconsin Senate, 12th District Election, 1960
Party	Candidate	Votes	%	±%
Democratic Primary, September 13, 1960
Democratic	Henry J. Berquist	4,123	81.32%	
Democratic	John J. Joo	947	18.68%	
Plurality		3,176	62.64%	
Total votes		5,070	100.0%	
General Election, November 8, 1960
Republican	Clifford Krueger (incumbent)	22,908	54.82%	
Democratic	Henry J. Berquist	18,876	45.18%	+8.19%
Plurality		4,032	9.65%	-16.39%
Total votes		41,784	100.0%	+8.23%
Republican hold				

Party political offices
Preceded by Anton M. Miller	Progressive nominee for Lieutenant Governor of Wisconsin; 1942	Succeeded by Clough Gates
Vacant Title last held by Alexander O. Benz	Progressive nominee for Governor of Wisconsin; 1948	Succeeded by M. Michael Essin
Wisconsin State Assembly
Preceded by Herman L. Kronschnabl	Member of the Wisconsin State Assembly from the Florence–Forest–Oneida district January 4, 1937 – November 24, 1942	Succeeded by Walter S. Fisher
