= Philip Nelson (Wisconsin politician) =

20th century American politician

Philip E. Nelson
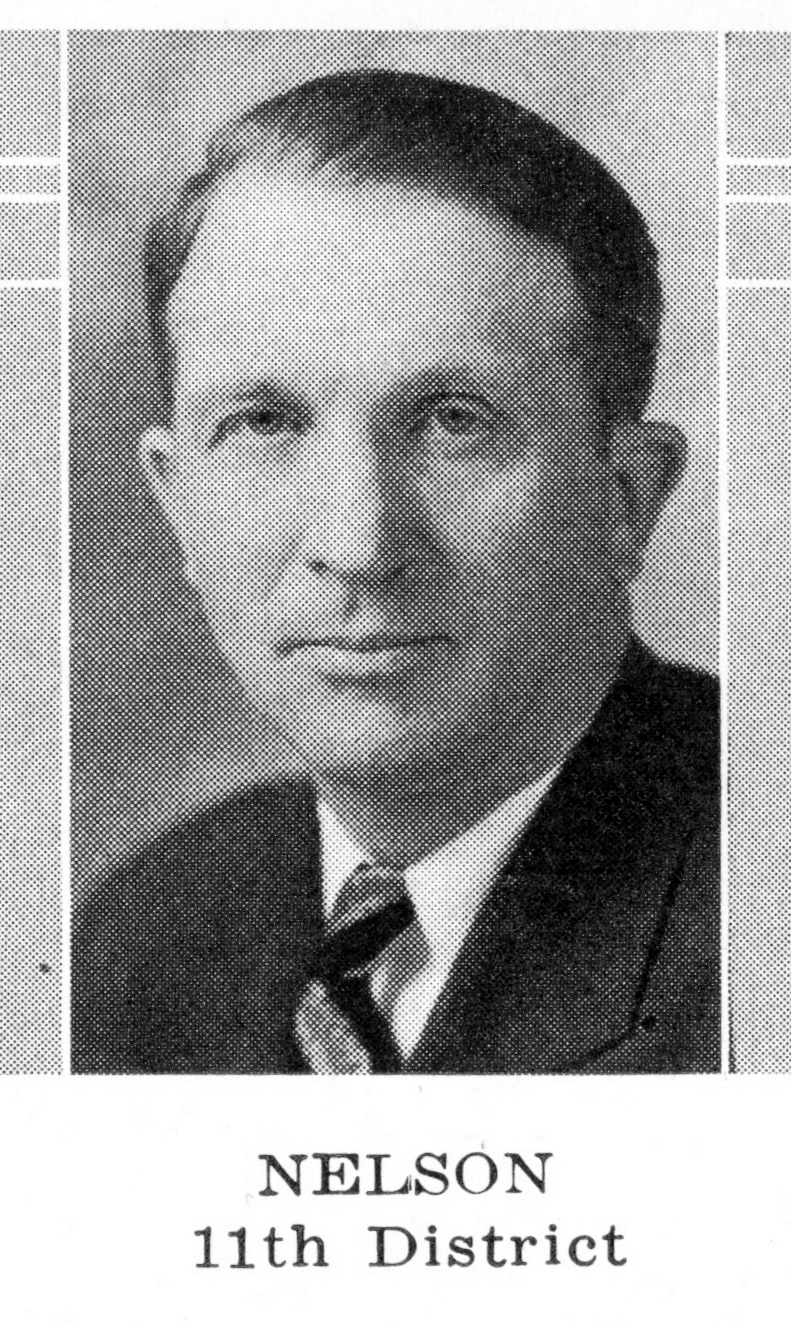

Member of the Wisconsin Senate from the 11th district
- In office January 5, 1931 – January 4, 1943
- Preceded by: R. Bruce Johnson
- Succeeded by: Elmer Peterson

Member of the Wisconsin State Assembly from the Douglas 2nd district
- In office January 3, 1927 – January 5, 1931
- Preceded by: R. Bruce Johnson
- Succeeded by: Joseph E. Westlund

Personal details
- Born: September 1, 1891 Curtiss, Wisconsin, U.S.
- Died: September 24, 1973 (aged 82) Superior, Wisconsin, U.S.
- Resting place: Nora Cemetery, Rice Lake, Wisconsin
- Party: Democratic (after 1946); Progressive; Republican (before 1937)
- Spouse: Effie V. Carlin (m. 1923; died 1962)
- Children: none
- Education: Williams Business College
- Occupation: Accountant, farmer

Military service
- Allegiance: United States
- Branch/service: United States Army
- Years of service: 1917–1918
- Battles/wars: World War I

Philip Emanuel Nelson (September 1, 1891 – September 24, 1973) was an American farmer, businessman, and Progressive politician from Douglas County, Wisconsin. He served 12 years in the Wisconsin Senate (1931–1943) and four years in the State Assembly (1927–1931), and was floor leader of the Senate Progressives during the 1937, 1939, and 1941 sessions. He also ran for Governor and Lieutenant Governor of Wisconsin and later served as a political appointee under presidents Franklin Roosevelt and Harry Truman, serving in roles at the War Production Board, the United States Department of Commerce, and the United States Department of Agriculture.

== Early life ==
Philip Nelson was born in Curtiss, Wisconsin, and graduated from Colby High School in nearby Colby, Wisconsin. He went on to attend Williams Business School in Oshkosh, Wisconsin. As a young man, he went to work as an accountant for the Oakland Motor Car Company in Pontiac, Michigan, but later returned to Wisconsin, operating a cheese factory and working as a general merchant in Rusk County. He ultimately settled in Maple, Wisconsin, in Douglas County, where he established a farm.

He served in the United States Army with the American Expeditionary Forces in World War I.

== Political career ==
After the war, Nelson was elected to the Douglas County board of supervisors in 1921 and 1925, and ultimately remained on the county board through 1935. In 1926, he was elected to the Wisconsin State Assembly, running on the Republican Party ticket. He was subsequently re-elected to that office in 1928. He represented Douglas County's 2nd Assembly district, which comprised most of Douglas County outside of the city of Superior.

In 1930, rather than running for another term in the Assembly, Nelson ran for Wisconsin Senate, launching a primary challenge against incumbent R. Bruce Johnson. Two other candidates also joined the primary, Charles W. Peacock and former state representative Sextus Lindahl. Johnson was supported by the stalwart faction of the Republican Party, Peacock had the endorsement of the state leaders of the progressive faction, but local progressive leaders were split between Peacock, Nelson, and Lindahl.

Nelson ultimately prevailed in the primary, receiving 33% of the vote in the four-way race. There was no Democratic nominee in the district, but Charles Peacock entered the general election race as an independent progressive candidate. Nelson went on to win the general election with 60% of the vote.

Nelson was re-elected in 1934 in a four-way general election and went on to serve as a delegate to the 1936 Republican National Convention. However, with the emergence of the Wisconsin Progressive Party after their formal schism from the Republican Party, Nelson began associating with the Progressives in the Senate, and worked as a floor leader for the Progressive caucus in the 1937 session. He went on to seek re-election in 1938 on the Progressive Party ticket, but faced another difficult primary election against two incumbent Progressive state representatives—Michael H. Hall and Harry Bergren. He managed to prevail with 43% of the vote and went on to win the 1938 general election with 43% in another four-way race. He continued to serve as Progressive Floor Leader for the remainder of his time in the Senate.

During his third term, in 1940, he ran for the Progressive Party nomination for Governor of Wisconsin. Ultimately five candidates sought the nomination in 1940, Nelson came in a distant 3rd behind Orland Steen Loomis and Harold E. Stafford. Loomis lost the election in 1940 but ran again in 1942.

In 1942, rather than running for re-election in the Senate, Nelson entered the Progressive Party primary race for Lieutenant Governor of Wisconsin. He defeated Henry J. Berquist in the primary, but ultimately decided to withdraw from the race a month before the election to accept a federal appointment as deputy chief of the municipal government section of the War Production Board in Washington, D.C. The Progressives replaced him with Berquist as their nominee for Lieutenant Governor, who went on to lose the general election to incumbent Republican Lieutenant Governor Walter Samuel Goodland. This turned out to be one of the most politically significant lieutenant gubernatorial elections in the state's history, as the Progressive gubernatorial nominee Orland Steen Loomis won the gubernatorial election but died before taking office, making Goodland the 31st Governor of Wisconsin.

After the end of World War II, Nelson received another federal appointment at the United States Department of Commerce, and was then appointed head of the dairy branch of the Production and Marketing Administration in the United States Department of Agriculture. Nelson ultimately returned to Wisconsin after Truman left office. Like many former Progressives, Nelson became aligned with the Democratic Party of Wisconsin and considered a return to elected office, but ultimately did not run again. He died at his home in Superior, Wisconsin, on September 24, 1973.

== Electoral history ==
=== Wisconsin Senate (1930, 1934, 1938) ===
Year	Election	Date	Elected				Defeated				Total	Plurality
1930	Primary	Sep. 16	Philip E. Nelson	Republican	6,429	32.90%	Charles W. Peacock	Rep.	4,902	25.09%	19,540	1,527
1930	Primary	Sep. 16	Philip E. Nelson	Republican	6,429	32.90%	R. Bruce Johnson (inc)	Rep.	4,266	21.83%	19,540	1,527
1930	Primary	Sep. 16	Philip E. Nelson	Republican	6,429	32.90%	Sextus Lindahl	Rep.	3,943	20.18%	19,540	1,527
1930	General	Nov. 4	Philip E. Nelson	Republican	11,758	60.94%	Charles W. Peacock	Ind.	7,536	39.06%	19,294	4,222
1934	General	Nov. 6	Philip E. Nelson (inc)	Republican	12,125	42.79%	Albert N. Young	Prog.	10,094	35.62%	28,335	2,031
1934	General	Nov. 6	Philip E. Nelson (inc)	Republican	12,125	42.79%	Laverne A. Sutfin	Dem.	5,667	20.00%	28,335	2,031
1934	General	Nov. 6	Philip E. Nelson (inc)	Republican	12,125	42.79%	Carrol T. Hodsdon	Soc.	449	1.58%	28,335	2,031
1938	Primary	Sep. 20	Philip E. Nelson (inc)	Progressive	6,789	43.20%	Michael H. Hall	Prog.	5,662	36.03%	15,716	1,127
1938	Primary	Sep. 20	Philip E. Nelson (inc)	Progressive	6,789	43.20%	Harry Bergren	Prog.	3,265	20.78%	15,716	1,127
1938	General	Nov. 8	Philip E. Nelson (inc)	Progressive	13,207	43.10%	August J. Christianson	Rep.	9,526	31.08%	30,646	3,681
1938	General	Nov. 8	Philip E. Nelson (inc)	Progressive	13,207	43.10%	Colin J. McRae	Dem.	5,601	18.28%	30,646	3,681
1938	General	Nov. 8	Philip E. Nelson (inc)	Progressive	13,207	43.10%	Michael H. Hall	Ind.	2,312	7.54%	30,646	3,681

=== Wisconsin Governor (1940) ===
Wisconsin Gubernatorial Election, 1940
Party	Candidate	Votes	%	±%
Progressive Primary, September 17, 1940
Progressive	Orland S. Loomis	50,699	33.05%	
Progressive	Harold E. Stafford	41,311	26.93%	
Progressive	Philip E. Nelson	24,485	15.96%	
Progressive	Paul R. Alfonsi	22,531	14.69%	
Progressive	Henry A. Gunderson	14,372	9.37%	
Plurality		9,388	6.12%	-54.30%
Total votes		153,398	100.0%	-9.72%

=== Wisconsin Lieutenant Governor (1942) ===
Wisconsin Lieutenant Gubernatorial Election, 1942
Party	Candidate	Votes	%	±%
Progressive Primary, September 22, 1942
Progressive	Philip E. Nelson	36,584	71.98%	
Progressive	Henry J. Berquist	14,240	28.02%	
Plurality		22,344	43.96%	
Total votes		50,824	100.0%	

== See also ==
- The Political Graveyard

Wisconsin State Assembly
Preceded by R. Bruce Johnson	Member of the Wisconsin State Assembly from the Douglas 2nd district January 3, 1927 – January 5, 1931	Succeeded by Joseph E. Westlund
Wisconsin Senate
Preceded by R. Bruce Johnson	Member of the Wisconsin Senate from the 11th district January 5, 1931 – January 4, 1943	Succeeded by Elmer Peterson
