= Elmer Peterson =

American farmer and politician

Elmer C. Peterson
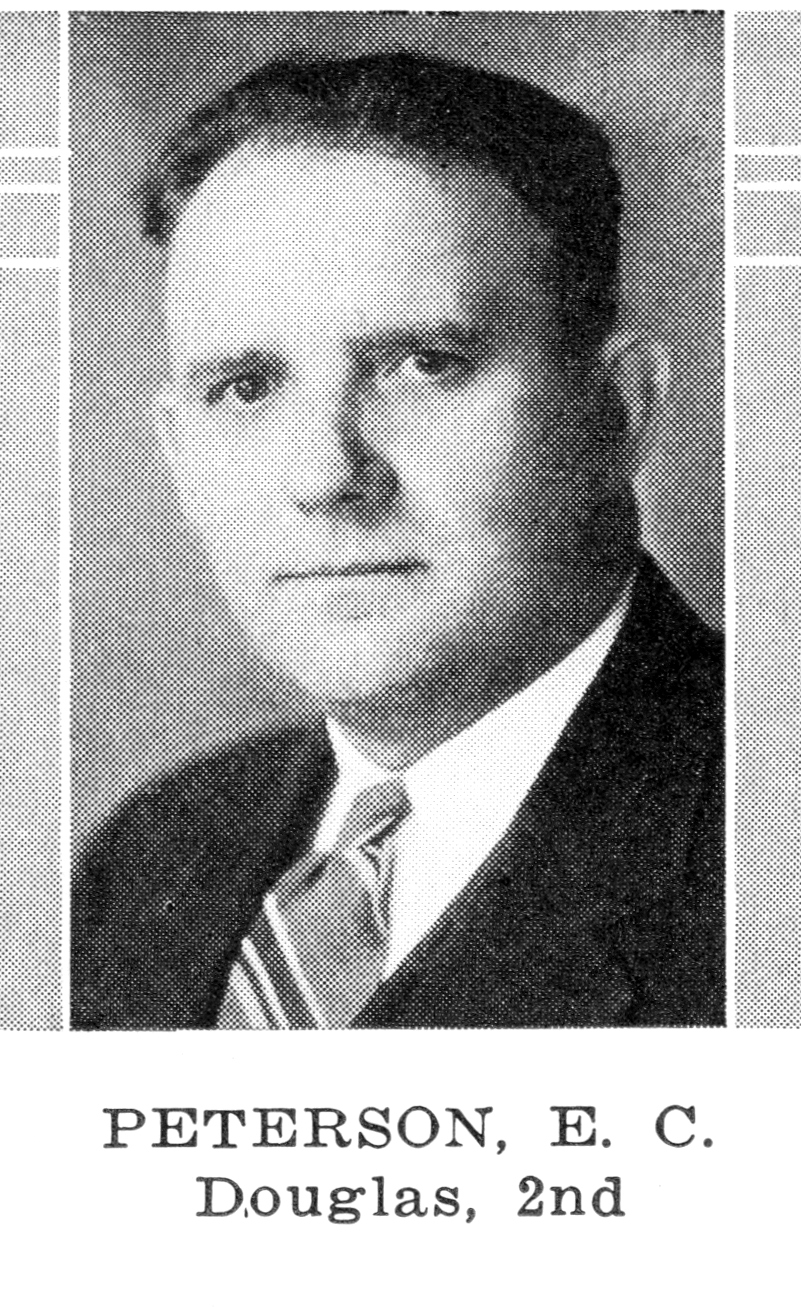

Member of the Wisconsin Senate from the 12th district
- In office 1943–1947
- Preceded by: Philip Nelson
- Succeeded by: Clifford Krueger

Personal details
- Born: November 30, 1891
- Died: June 17, 1978 (aged 86)
- Resting place: Greenwood Cemetery, Superior, Wisconsin
- Party: Progressive

Military service
- Allegiance: United States
- Branch/service: United States Army
- Rank: Private
- Battles/wars: World War I

Elmer Peterson (November 30, 1891 – June 17, 1978) was an American farmer and politician.

== Early years ==
Born in Martin County, Minnesota, Peterson was raised in Rockford, Illinois and attended Brown's Business College in Rockford. He served in the United States Army during World War I. He lived in Superior, Wisconsin and was a farmer.

== Career ==
He served as the town clerk, on the school board, and on the Douglas County, Wisconsin Board of Supervisors. Peterson served in the Wisconsin State Assembly from 1933 to 1941. He then served in the Wisconsin Senate, representing the 11th District from 1943 to 1947. He was a member of the Wisconsin Progressive Party.
