= 1940 Wisconsin gubernatorial election =

- November 5, 1940
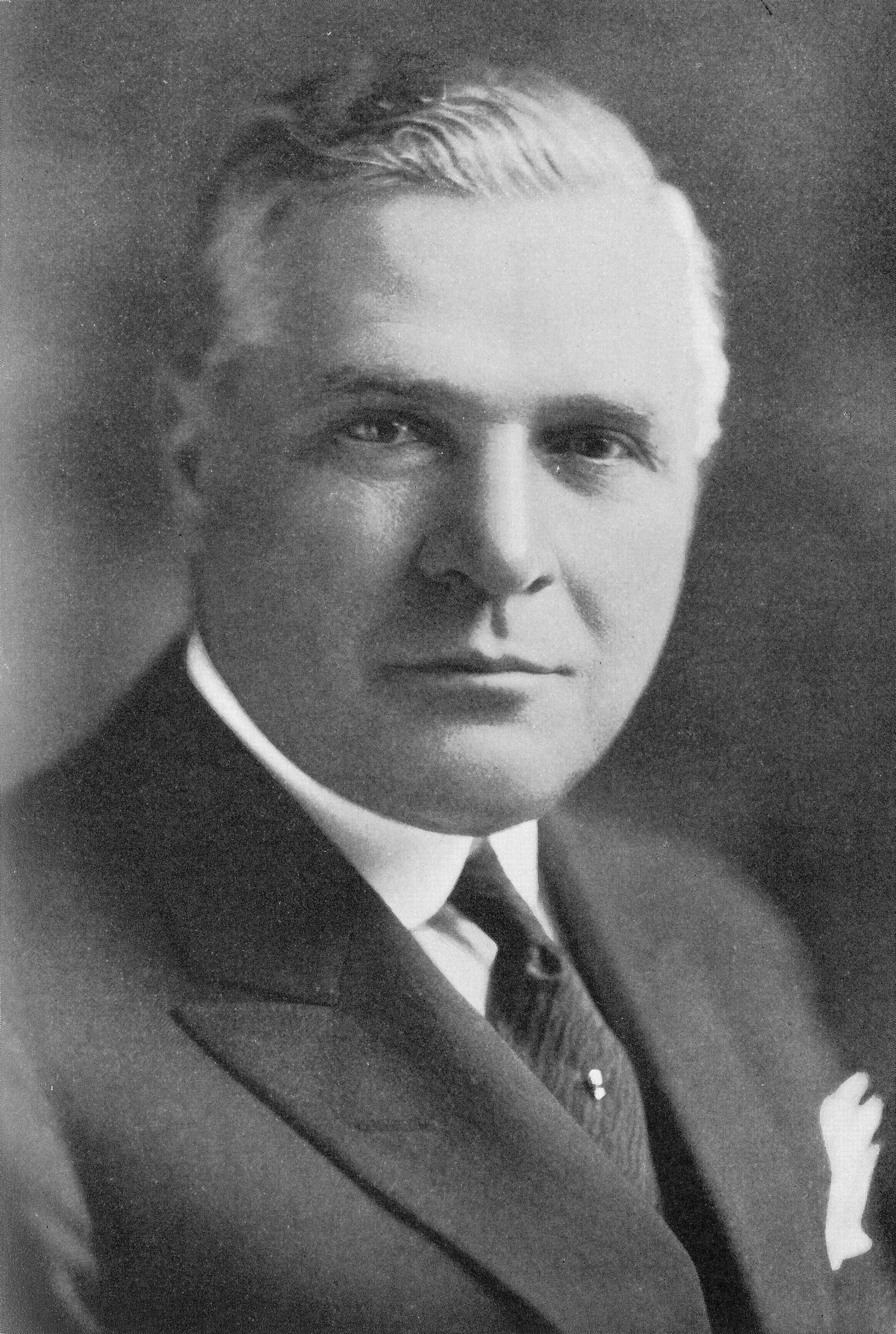

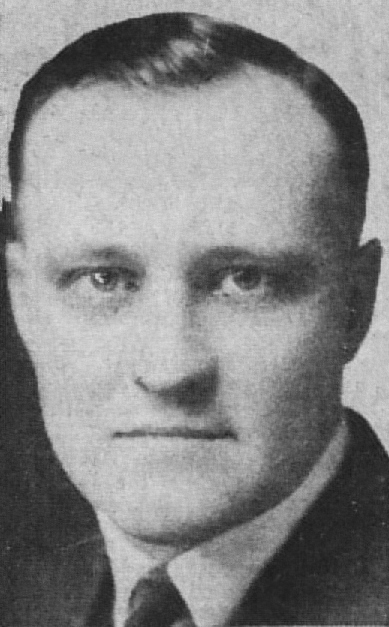

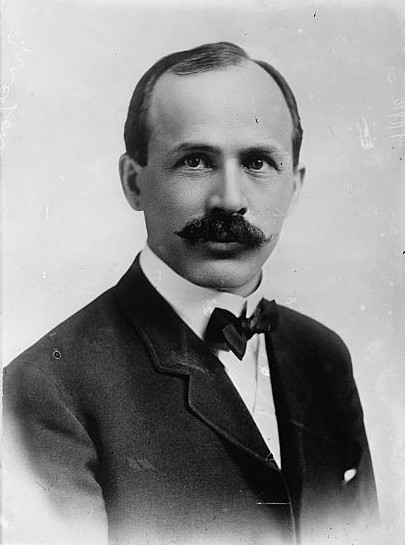
Nominee	Julius P. Heil	Orland Steen Loomis	Francis E. McGovern
Party	Republican	Progressive	Democratic
Popular vote	558,678	546,436	264,985
Percentage	40.67%	39.78%	19.29%
- County results Heil: 30–40% 40–50% 50–60% 60–70% Loomis: 30–40% 40–50% 50–60% 60–70% McGovern: 30–40%
Governor before election
Julius P. Heil
Republican
Elected Governor
Julius P. Heil
Republican

The 1940 Wisconsin gubernatorial election was held on November 5, 1940. Primary elections were held on September 17, 1940.

Incumbent Republican Governor Julius P. Heil defeated Progressive nominee Orland Steen Loomis and Democratic nominee Francis E. McGovern with 40.67% of the vote. This election is very similar to the 1855 Ohio gubernatorial election in that the three major candidates had served as Governor in the past, present, and future, although Loomis died before taking office after winning the next gubernatorial election; Heil and McGovern both served as governors for the state.

== Republican primary ==
=== Candidates ===
==== Nominee ====
- Julius P. Heil, incumbent Governor

==== Eliminated in primary ====
- James K. Robinson, dentist, unsuccessful candidate for Progressive nomination for Lieutenant Governor in 1936

=== Results ===
Republican primary results
Party	Candidate	Votes	%
Republican	Julius P. Heil (incumbent)	249,269	67.98%
Republican	James K. Robinson	117,385	32.02%
Total votes		366,654	100.00%

== Progressive primary ==
=== Candidates ===
==== Nominee ====
- Orland S. Loomis, former Attorney General of Wisconsin

==== Eliminated in primary ====
- Paul Alfonsi, former Speaker of the Wisconsin State Assembly
- Henry Gunderson, former Lieutenant Governor
- Philip E. Nelson, incumbent State Senator
- Harold E. Stafford, attorney

==== Declined ====
- Merlin Hull, U.S. Representative

=== Results ===
Primary results by county: Loomis: 20–30%; 30–40%; 40–50%; 50–60%; 60–70%; 70–80%; 80–90%; Stafford: 30–40%; 40–50%; 50–60%; 60–70%; 80–90%; Nelson: 20–30%; 40–50%; 60–70%; Alfonsi: 20–30%; 30–40%; 40–50%; 60–70%; 80–90%; >90%; Gunderson: 30–40%; 40–50%

Progressive primary results
Party	Candidate	Votes	%
Progressive	Orland Steen Loomis	50,699	33.05%
Progressive	Harold E. Stafford	41,311	26.93%
Progressive	Philip E. Nelson	24,485	15.96%
Progressive	Paul Alfonsi	22,531	14.69%
Progressive	Henry Gunderson	14,372	9.37%
Total votes		153,398	100.00%

== Democratic primary ==
=== Candidates ===
==== Nominee ====
- Francis E. McGovern, former Governor

==== Eliminated in primary ====
- William R. Callahan, Democratic nominee for Secretary of State of Wisconsin in 1938
- Raymond J. Cannon, former U.S. Representative
- Gerhard A. Hagedorn, electrical salesman

==== Withdrawn ====
- William B. Rubin

==== Results ====
Democratic primary results
Party	Candidate	Votes	%
Democratic	Francis E. McGovern	54,025	38.91%
Democratic	William R. Callahan	44,868	32.31%
Democratic	Raymond J. Cannon	30,560	22.01%
Democratic	Gerhard A. Hagedorn	9,407	6.77%
Total votes		138,860	100.00%

== Other party nominations ==
- Fred Basset Blair, Communist, candidate for Governor in 1932
- Louis Fisher, Socialist Labor

== General election ==
=== Results ===
1940 Wisconsin gubernatorial election
Party	Candidate	Votes	%	±%
Republican	Julius P. Heil (incumbent)	558,678	40.67%	−14.72%
Progressive	Orland S. Loomis	546,436	39.78%	+3.77%
Democratic	Francis E. McGovern	264,985	19.29%	+11.30%
Communist (Note: "Independent Communist")	Fred Basset Blair	2,340	0.17%	
Socialist Labor (Note: "Independent Socialist Labor")	Louis Fisher	1,158	0.08%	−0.06%
	Scattering (Note: These are not listed in the Blue Book but are listed in the Board of Canvassers report.)	157	0.01%	
Plurality		12,242	0.89%	
Total votes		1,373,754	100.00%	
Republican hold		Swing	-18.50%	

=== Results by county ===
Barron County, Buffalo County, Grant County, Monroe County, Sauk County, Trempealeau County, and Vernon County voted for the losing candidate for the first time since 1892, while Juneau County voted for the losing candidate for the first time since 1890.

County	Julius P. Heil Republican		Orland S. Loomis Progressive		Francis E. McGovern Democratic		All Others Various		Margin (Note: All margins are Heil over Loomis unless otherwise noted)		Total votes cast
County	#	%	#	%	#	%	#	%	#	%	Total votes cast
Adams	1,231	34.54%	2,112	59.26%	211	5.92%	10	0.28%	-881	-24.72%	3,564
Ashland	3,120	34.46%	4,340	47.93%	1,537	16.98%	57	0.63%	-1,220	-13.47%	9,054
Barron	5,422	39.47%	7,216	52.53%	1,071	7.80%	29	0.21%	-1,794	-13.06%	13,738
Bayfield	2,198	31.51%	3,833	54.95%	906	12.99%	38	0.54%	-1,635	-23.44%	6,975
Brown	13,536	40.08%	8,910	26.38%	11,305	33.47%	25	0.07%	2,231 (Note: Heil's margin over McGovern)	6.61%	33,776
Buffalo	2,803	44.65%	3,077	49.01%	393	6.26%	5	0.08%	-274	-4.36%	6,278
Burnett	1,756	36.46%	2,451	50.89%	587	12.19%	22	0.46%	-695	-14.43%	4,816
Calumet	4,156	54.94%	2,051	27.12%	1,350	17.85%	7	0.09%	2,105	27.83%	7,564
Chippewa	6,979	44.88%	6,889	44.31%	1,659	10.67%	22	0.14%	90	0.58%	15,549
Clark	6,977	49.93%	5,735	41.04%	1,203	8.61%	59	0.42%	1,242	8.89%	13,974
Columbia	5,907	38.93%	7,709	50.80%	1,548	10.20%	11	0.07%	-1,802	-11.87%	15,175
Crawford	3,712	46.64%	2,431	30.55%	1,813	22.78%	2	0.03%	1,281	16.10%	7,958
Dane	15,863	25.14%	42,136	66.78%	5,012	7.94%	84	0.13%	-26,273	-41.64%	63,095
Dodge	10,712	45.75%	8,079	34.50%	4,599	19.64%	25	0.11%	2,633	11.24%	23,415
Door	4,384	55.66%	2,596	32.96%	853	10.83%	43	0.55%	1,788	22.70%	7,876
Douglas	6,359	29.70%	10,418	48.66%	4,490	20.97%	141	0.66%	-4,059	-18.96%	21,408
Dunn	5,047	45.35%	5,185	46.59%	882	7.93%	14	0.13%	-138	-1.24%	11,128
Eau Claire	8,095	42.03%	9,224	47.90%	1,922	9.98%	17	0.09%	-1,129	-5.86%	19,258
Florence	749	40.46%	677	36.57%	411	22.20%	14	0.76%	72	3.89%	1,851
Fond du Lac	13,212	48.48%	8,535	31.32%	5,435	19.94%	73	0.27%	4,677	17.16%	27,255
Forest	1,267	29.72%	1,366	32.04%	1,617	37.93%	13	0.30%	-251 (Note: McGovern's margin over Loomis)	-5.89%	4,263
Grant	7,664	42.50%	8,046	44.62%	2,298	12.74%	26	0.14%	-382	-2.12%	18,034
Green	4,786	47.37%	4,264	42.20%	1,044	10.33%	10	0.10%	522	5.17%	10,104
Green Lake	4,071	56.86%	1,591	22.22%	1,487	20.77%	11	0.15%	2,480	34.64%	7,160
Iowa	3,834	42.82%	4,092	45.70%	1,019	11.38%	9	0.10%	-258	-2.88%	8,954
Iron	1,512	30.91%	2,671	54.60%	687	14.04%	22	0.45%	-1,159	-23.69%	4,892
Jackson	2,675	35.92%	4,294	57.66%	474	6.36%	4	0.05%	-1,619	-21.74%	7,447
Jefferson	8,105	46.00%	5,576	31.65%	3,923	22.26%	16	0.09%	2,529	14.35%	17,620
Juneau	2,615	30.11%	5,632	64.85%	434	5.00%	4	0.05%	-3,017	-34.74%	8,685
Kenosha	10,355	35.63%	10,631	36.58%	8,013	27.57%	60	0.21%	-276	-0.95%	29,059
Kewaunee	3,331	48.95%	1,560	22.92%	1,886	27.71%	28	0.41%	1,445	21.23%	6,805
La Crosse	11,504	43.95%	10,277	39.26%	4,375	16.72%	18	0.07%	1,227	4.69%	26,174
Lafayette	4,065	44.29%	3,330	36.28%	1,778	19.37%	5	0.05%	735	8.01%	9,178
Langlade	3,627	38.76%	2,710	28.96%	2,996	32.02%	25	0.27%	631	6.74%	9,358
Lincoln	4,352	44.01%	4,441	44.91%	1,060	10.72%	36	0.36%	-89	-0.90%	9,889
Manitowoc	10,266	40.11%	9,832	38.41%	5,477	21.40%	22	0.09%	434	1.70%	25,597
Marathon	12,769	44.22%	9,872	34.19%	6,164	21.35%	71	0.25%	2,897	10.03%	28,876
Marinette	7,433	49.91%	2,921	19.61%	4,508	30.27%	32	0.21%	2,925	19.64%	14,894
Marquette	2,541	60.72%	1,128	26.95%	510	12.19%	6	0.14%	1,413	33.76%	4,185
Milwaukee	115,732	33.35%	147,826	42.59%	82,036	23.64%	1,462	0.42%	-32,094	-9.25%	347,056
Monroe	4,539	36.08%	7,134	56.71%	889	7.07%	17	0.14%	-2,595	-20.63%	12,579
Oconto	5,104	45.48%	2,739	24.41%	3,364	29.98%	15	0.13%	1,740	15.51%	11,222
Oneida	2,938	33.45%	3,658	41.65%	2,157	24.56%	29	0.33%	-720	-8.20%	8,782
Outagamie	15,637	52.96%	7,421	25.13%	6,406	21.70%	61	0.21%	8,216	27.83%	29,525
Ozaukee	3,641	43.33%	2,908	34.61%	1,838	21.88%	15	0.18%	733	8.72%	8,402
Pepin	1,787	54.02%	1,137	34.37%	376	11.37%	8	0.24%	650	19.65%	3,308
Pierce	4,355	46.64%	4,160	44.55%	811	8.69%	11	0.12%	195	2.09%	9,337
Polk	4,044	37.29%	5,805	53.53%	975	8.99%	21	0.19%	-1,761	-16.24%	10,845
Portage	4,736	30.84%	5,445	35.46%	5,161	33.61%	13	0.08%	-709	-4.62%	15,355
Price	3,558	46.25%	2,616	34.00%	1,392	18.09%	127	1.65%	942	12.24%	7,693
Racine	16,754	39.65%	15,583	36.88%	9,795	23.18%	126	0.30%	1,171	2.77%	42,258
Richland	4,720	53.24%	3,041	34.30%	1,089	12.28%	15	0.17%	1,679	18.94%	8,865
Rock	18,482	50.39%	11,661	31.79%	6,451	17.59%	84	0.23%	6,821	18.60%	36,678
Rusk	3,221	46.89%	2,333	33.96%	1,288	18.75%	27	0.39%	888	12.93%	6,869
Sauk	6,535	42.36%	7,385	47.87%	1,492	9.67%	15	0.10%	-850	-5.51%	15,427
Sawyer	2,218	45.71%	1,540	31.74%	1,085	22.36%	9	0.19%	678	13.97%	4,852
Shawano	6,745	49.92%	4,757	35.21%	1,987	14.71%	22	0.16%	1,988	14.71%	13,511
Sheboygan	14,141	44.24%	6,955	21.76%	10,732	33.58%	135	0.42%	3,409	10.67%	31,963
St. Croix	4,871	43.77%	4,484	40.29%	1,756	15.78%	17	0.15%	387	3.48%	11,128
Taylor	3,068	41.03%	2,712	36.27%	1,668	22.31%	30	0.40%	356	4.76%	7,478
Trempealeau	3,852	39.52%	4,611	47.31%	1,277	13.10%	6	0.06%	-759	-7.79%	9,746
Vernon	5,352	44.15%	5,833	48.12%	926	7.64%	12	0.10%	-481	-3.97%	12,123
Vilas	1,870	41.12%	1,213	26.67%	1,427	31.38%	38	0.84%	443	9.74%	4,548
Walworth	10,980	64.88%	3,245	19.18%	2,688	15.88%	10	0.06%	7,735	45.71%	16,923
Washburn	1,903	34.77%	3,033	55.42%	525	9.59%	12	0.22%	-1,130	-20.65%	5,473
Washington	6,767	51.37%	3,951	29.99%	2,445	18.56%	11	0.08%	2,816	21.38%	13,174
Waukesha	15,344	51.88%	9,668	32.69%	4,532	15.32%	33	0.11%	5,676	19.19%	29,577
Waupaca	8,371	53.53%	5,813	37.17%	1,423	9.10%	31	0.20%	2,558	16.36%	15,638
Waushara	4,179	63.44%	1,759	26.70%	628	9.53%	21	0.32%	2,420	36.74%	6,587
Winnebago	17,013	49.67%	9,751	28.47%	7,413	21.64%	73	0.21%	7,262	21.20%	34,250
Wood	7,231	40.85%	8,421	47.57%	2,016	11.39%	33	0.19%	-1,190	-6.72%	17,701
Total	558,678	40.67%	546,436	39.78%	264,985	19.29%	3,655	0.27%	12,242	0.89%	1,373,754

==== Counties that flipped from Progressive to Republican ====
- Florence
- Taylor

==== Counties that flipped from Republican to Progressive ====
- Barron
- Buffalo
- Columbia
- Dunn
- Eau Claire
- Grant
- Iowa
- Juneau
- Kenosha
- Lincoln
- Milwaukee
- Monroe
- Oneida
- Portage
- Sauk
- Trempealeau
- Vernon
- Wood

==== Counties that flipped from Progressive to Democratic ====
- Forest

== Bibliography ==
- Gubernatorial Elections, 1787-1997. Washington, D.C.: Congressional Quarterly Inc. 1998. ISBN 1-56802-396-0.
- Ohm, Howard F.; Bryhan, Leone G., eds. (1942). The Wisconsin Blue Book, 1942. State of Wisconsin.
