= Bruce Johnson (Wisconsin politician) =

American politician

R. Bruce Johnson

Member of the Wisconsin Senate from the 25th district
- In office January 3, 1927 – January 5, 1931
- Preceded by: Joseph L. Barber
- Succeeded by: Philip Nelson

Personal details
- Party: Republican

Robert Bruce Johnson (August 18, 1875 – October 16, 1932) was a Republican member of the Wisconsin Senate, representing the 25th District from 1927 to 1931. He resided in Superior, Wisconsin.
