= 1930 Wisconsin gubernatorial election =

- November 4, 1930
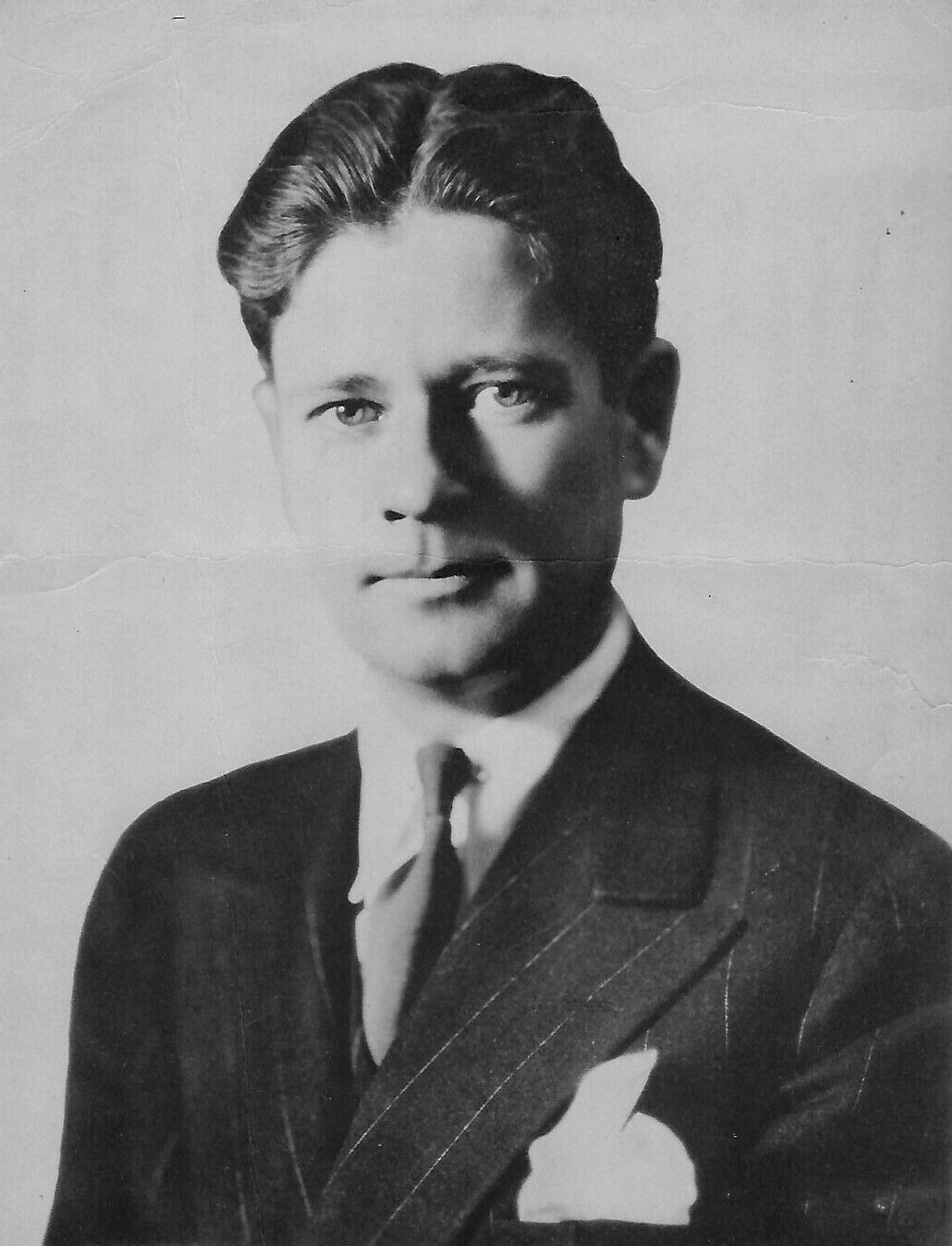

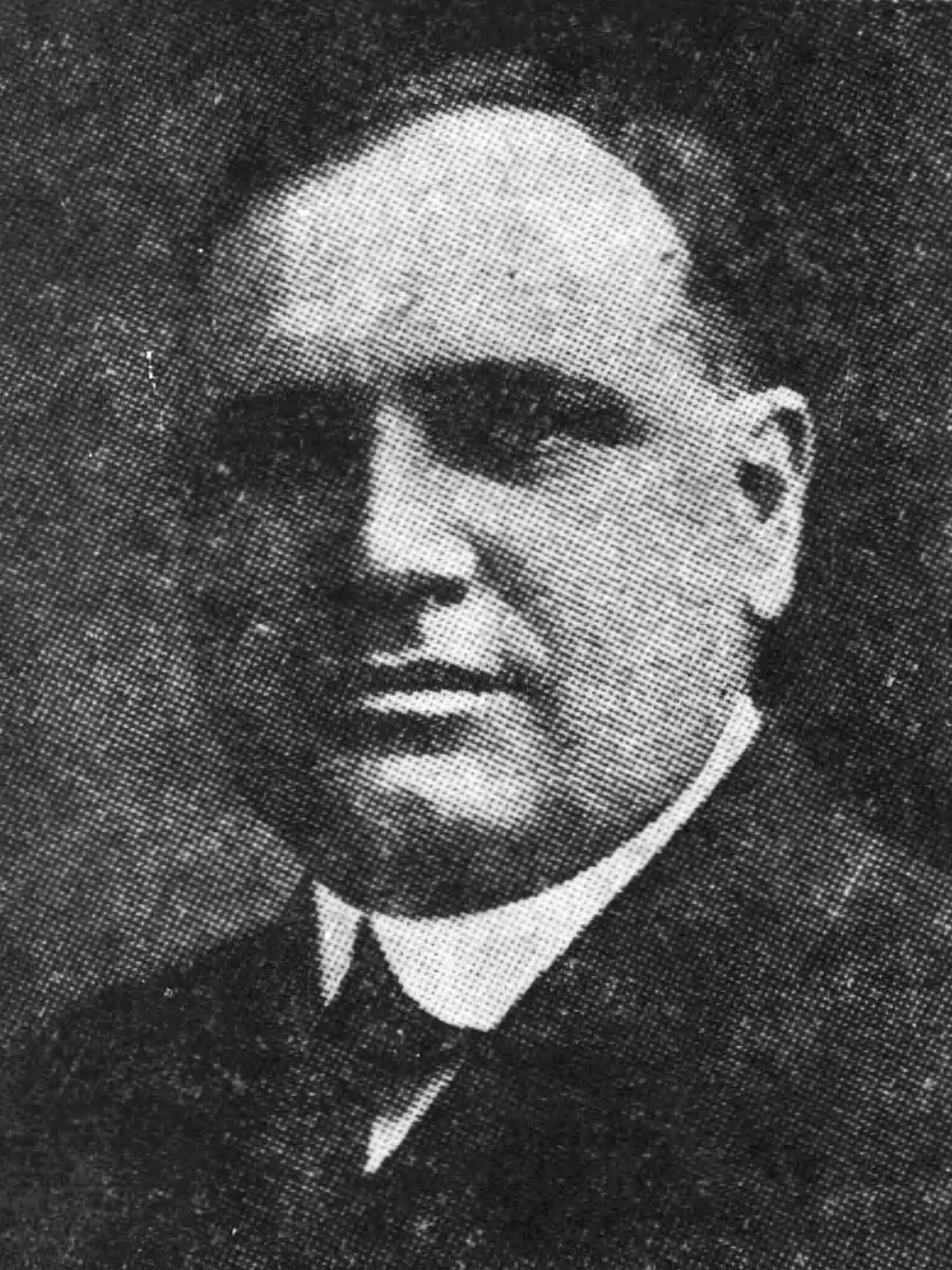
Nominee	Philip La Follette	Charles E. Hammersley
Party	Republican	Democratic
Popular vote	392,958	170,020
Percentage	64.76%	28.02%
- County results La Follette: 40–50% 50–60% 60–70% 70–80% 80–90% >90% Hammersley: 50–60%
Governor before election
Walter J. Kohler Sr.
Republican
Elected Governor
Philip La Follette
Republican

The 1930 Wisconsin gubernatorial election was held on November 4, 1930. Primary elections were held on September 16, 1930. Incumbent Republican Governor Walter J. Kohler Sr. was defeated in the Republican primary. Republican nominee Philip La Follette defeated Democratic nominee Charles E. Hammersley with 64.76% of the vote.

== Primary election ==
=== Republican party ===
==== Candidates ====
- Walter J. Kohler Sr., incumbent Governor
- Philip La Follette, former district attorney for Dane County

==== Results ====
Primary results by county: La Follette: 50–60%; 60–70%; 70–80%; Kohler: 50–60%

Republican primary results
Party	Candidate	Votes	%
Republican	Philip La Follette	339,551	59.64%
Republican	Walter J. Kohler Sr. (incumbent)	267,687	40.36%
Total votes		663,238	100.00%

=== Democratic party ===
==== Candidates ====
- Charles E. Hammersley, former attorney

==== Results ====
Democratic primary results
Party	Candidate	Votes	%
Democratic	Charles E. Hammersley	17,040	100.00%
Total votes		17,040	100.00%

=== Social-Democratic party ===
==== Candidates ====
- Frank Metcalfe, County Supervisor and former member of the Wisconsin State Assembly

==== Results ====
Social-Democratic primary results
Party	Candidate	Votes	%
Social-Democratic	Frank Metcalfe	11,569	100.00%
Total votes		11,569	100.00%

=== Prohibition party ===
==== Candidates ====
- Adolph R. Bucknam, Prohibition nominee for U.S. Senate in 1922 and for Governor in 1924 and 1928
- Henry Meisel
- Alfred B. Taynton, former secretary of the Wisconsin prohibition state committee and unsuccessful candidate for Prohibition nomination for U.S. Senate in 1926

==== Results ====
Prohibition primary results
Party	Candidate	Votes	%
Prohibition	Alfred B. Taynton	655	44.02%
Prohibition	Adolph R. Bucknam	503	33.80%
Prohibition	Henry Meisel	330	22.18%
Total votes		1,488	100.00%

=== Other party nominations ===
- Fred Basset Blair, Independent Communist, former experimental college student

== General election ==
=== Results ===
1930 Wisconsin gubernatorial election
Party	Candidate	Votes	%	±%
Republican	Philip La Follette	392,958	64.76%	+9.38%
Democratic	Charles E. Hammersley	170,020	28.02%	−11.85%
Social-Democratic	Frank Metcalfe	25,607	4.22%	+0.49%
Prohibition	Alfred B. Taynton	14,818	2.44%	+1.79%
Communist (Note: "Independent Communist")	Fred Basset Blair	2,998	0.49%	+0.35%
	Scattering (Note: These are not listed in the Blue Book but are listed in the Board of Canvassers report.)	424	0.07%	
Majority		222,938	36.74%	
Total votes		606,825	100.00%	
Republican hold		Swing	+21.23%	

=== Results by county ===
After this election, Forest County would not vote for a Republican gubernatorial candidate again until 1952 while Iron County would not do so again until 1990.

County	Philip La Follette Republican		Charles E. Hammersley Democratic		Frank Metcalfe Social-Democratic		Alfred B. Taynton Prohibition		Fred B. Blair Communist		Scattering Write-in		Margin		Total votes cast
County	#	%	#	%	#	%	#	%	#	%	#	%	#	%	Total votes cast
Adams	950	79.83%	198	16.64%	4	0.34%	31	2.61%	6	0.50%	1	0.08%	752	63.19%	1,190
Ashland	2,949	81.08%	553	15.20%	20	0.55%	78	2.14%	36	0.99%	1	0.03%	2,396	65.88%	3,637
Barron	4,755	82.61%	539	9.36%	27	0.47%	353	6.13%	65	1.13%	17	0.30%	4,216	73.25%	5,756
Bayfield	2,399	81.29%	323	10.95%	16	0.54%	123	4.17%	87	2.95%	3	0.10%	2,076	70.35%	2,951
Brown	9,043	51.97%	8,107	46.59%	90	0.52%	153	0.88%	7	0.04%	0	0.00%	936	5.38%	17,400
Buffalo	2,094	84.23%	333	13.40%	4	0.16%	51	2.05%	0	0.00%	4	0.16%	1,761	70.84%	2,486
Burnett	2,390	89.21%	152	5.67%	14	0.52%	91	3.40%	22	0.82%	10	0.37%	2,238	83.54%	2,679
Calumet	2,999	65.01%	1,571	34.06%	15	0.33%	27	0.59%	0	0.00%	1	0.02%	1,428	30.96%	4,613
Chippewa	3,789	76.47%	880	17.76%	15	0.30%	240	4.84%	16	0.32%	15	0.30%	2,909	58.71%	4,955
Clark	4,026	77.26%	882	16.93%	41	0.79%	219	4.20%	43	0.83%	0	0.00%	3,144	60.33%	5,211
Columbia	4,716	70.79%	1,686	25.31%	11	0.17%	225	3.38%	16	0.24%	8	0.12%	3,030	45.48%	6,662
Crawford	3,427	72.70%	1,182	25.07%	8	0.17%	91	1.93%	3	0.06%	3	0.06%	2,245	47.62%	4,714
Dane	18,241	75.78%	5,061	21.03%	60	0.25%	665	2.76%	27	0.11%	17	0.07%	13,180	54.75%	24,071
Dodge	9,001	64.79%	4,641	33.41%	78	0.56%	167	1.20%	6	0.04%	0	0.00%	4,360	31.38%	13,893
Door	1,939	75.24%	472	18.32%	5	0.19%	157	6.09%	0	0.00%	4	0.16%	1,467	56.93%	2,577
Douglas	10,557	80.37%	1,470	11.19%	75	0.57%	821	6.25%	212	1.61%	0	0.00%	9,087	69.18%	13,135
Dunn	3,875	81.87%	537	11.35%	14	0.30%	276	5.83%	14	0.30%	17	0.36%	3,338	70.53%	4,733
Eau Claire	6,138	76.55%	1,541	19.22%	21	0.26%	254	3.17%	52	0.65%	12	0.15%	4,597	57.33%	8,018
Florence	956	90.02%	82	7.72%	3	0.28%	6	0.56%	15	1.41%	0	0.00%	874	82.30%	1,062
Fond du Lac	8,731	55.18%	6,563	41.48%	135	0.85%	340	2.15%	51	0.32%	3	0.02%	2,168	13.70%	15,823
Forest	1,519	78.22%	375	19.31%	7	0.36%	24	1.24%	15	0.77%	2	0.10%	1,144	58.91%	1,942
Grant	7,456	73.40%	2,275	22.40%	11	0.11%	352	3.47%	42	0.41%	22	0.22%	5,181	51.00%	10,158
Green	3,695	78.30%	675	14.30%	9	0.19%	327	6.93%	3	0.06%	10	0.21%	3,020	64.00%	4,719
Green Lake	1,954	57.96%	1,340	39.75%	9	0.27%	66	1.96%	1	0.03%	1	0.03%	614	18.21%	3,371
Iowa	3,816	72.85%	1,032	19.70%	8	0.15%	368	7.03%	9	0.17%	5	0.10%	2,784	53.15%	5,238
Iron	2,841	88.75%	203	6.34%	11	0.34%	12	0.37%	134	4.19%	0	0.00%	2,638	82.41%	3,201
Jackson	2,534	79.19%	559	17.47%	13	0.41%	53	1.66%	2	0.06%	39	1.22%	1,975	61.72%	3,200
Jefferson	6,471	65.15%	3,255	32.77%	26	0.26%	174	1.75%	4	0.04%	2	0.02%	3,216	32.38%	9,932
Juneau	3,108	82.62%	546	14.51%	12	0.32%	67	1.78%	21	0.56%	8	0.21%	2,562	68.10%	3,762
Kenosha	10,497	66.45%	4,320	27.35%	343	2.17%	516	3.27%	111	0.70%	9	0.06%	6,177	39.10%	15,796
Kewaunee	3,345	77.32%	953	22.03%	7	0.16%	16	0.37%	2	0.05%	3	0.07%	2,392	55.29%	4,326
La Crosse	7,045	57.39%	4,875	39.71%	20	0.16%	280	2.28%	29	0.24%	26	0.21%	2,170	17.68%	12,275
Lafayette	3,058	69.93%	1,170	26.76%	6	0.14%	125	2.86%	11	0.25%	3	0.07%	1,888	43.17%	4,373
Langlade	4,055	62.94%	2,259	35.06%	19	0.29%	86	1.33%	24	0.37%	0	0.00%	1,796	27.88%	6,443
Lincoln	2,875	75.08%	849	22.17%	19	0.50%	64	1.67%	19	0.50%	3	0.08%	2,026	52.91%	3,829
Manitowoc	9,460	67.21%	4,482	31.84%	74	0.53%	52	0.37%	8	0.06%	0	0.00%	4,978	35.37%	14,076
Marathon	9,176	75.51%	2,682	22.07%	86	0.71%	168	1.38%	40	0.33%	0	0.00%	6,494	53.44%	12,152
Marinette	2,728	62.04%	1,431	32.54%	80	1.82%	145	3.30%	13	0.30%	0	0.00%	1,297	29.50%	4,397
Marquette	1,598	65.71%	750	30.84%	10	0.41%	71	2.92%	3	0.12%	0	0.00%	848	34.87%	2,432
Milwaukee	68,891	52.01%	39,372	29.72%	22,320	16.85%	983	0.74%	874	0.66%	23	0.02%	29,519	22.28%	132,463
Monroe	4,353	80.51%	827	15.29%	10	0.18%	217	4.01%	0	0.00%	0	0.00%	3,526	65.21%	5,407
Oconto	5,106	72.94%	1,745	24.93%	20	0.29%	91	1.30%	34	0.49%	4	0.06%	3,361	48.01%	7,000
Oneida	2,732	73.09%	891	23.84%	55	1.47%	44	1.18%	12	0.32%	4	0.11%	1,841	49.25%	3,738
Outagamie	9,137	62.05%	5,297	35.97%	39	0.26%	216	1.47%	33	0.22%	3	0.02%	3,840	26.08%	14,725
Ozaukee	2,981	64.48%	1,594	34.48%	28	0.61%	17	0.37%	3	0.06%	0	0.00%	1,387	30.00%	4,623
Pepin	1,406	75.67%	270	14.53%	8	0.43%	144	7.75%	26	1.40%	4	0.22%	1,136	61.14%	1,858
Pierce	3,197	79.79%	361	9.01%	15	0.37%	393	9.81%	31	0.77%	10	0.25%	2,836	70.78%	4,007
Polk	3,196	86.40%	289	7.81%	18	0.49%	178	4.81%	7	0.19%	11	0.30%	2,907	78.59%	3,699
Portage	5,229	59.84%	3,340	38.22%	59	0.68%	106	1.21%	4	0.05%	1	0.01%	1,889	21.62%	8,739
Price	2,914	78.61%	579	15.62%	30	0.81%	98	2.64%	79	2.13%	7	0.19%	2,335	62.99%	3,707
Racine	10,080	54.83%	7,369	40.09%	396	2.15%	356	1.94%	177	0.96%	5	0.03%	2,711	14.75%	18,383
Richland	2,678	65.73%	1,056	25.92%	13	0.32%	272	6.68%	55	1.35%	0	0.00%	1,622	39.81%	4,074
Rock	5,385	64.20%	2,244	26.75%	28	0.33%	720	8.58%	11	0.13%	0	0.00%	3,141	37.45%	8,388
Rusk	1,925	74.41%	360	13.92%	23	0.89%	261	10.09%	13	0.50%	5	0.19%	1,565	60.49%	2,587
Sauk	6,261	75.50%	1,442	17.39%	18	0.22%	478	5.76%	91	1.10%	3	0.04%	4,819	58.11%	8,293
Sawyer	2,058	84.41%	213	8.74%	13	0.53%	115	4.72%	35	1.44%	4	0.16%	1,845	75.68%	2,438
Shawano	4,440	79.38%	1,061	18.97%	27	0.48%	53	0.95%	10	0.18%	2	0.04%	3,379	60.41%	5,593
Sheboygan	7,190	44.68%	8,074	50.17%	532	3.31%	272	1.69%	24	0.15%	2	0.01%	-884	-5.49%	16,094
St. Croix	6,085	72.61%	1,927	23.00%	19	0.23%	282	3.37%	66	0.79%	1	0.01%	4,158	49.62%	8,380
Taylor	3,210	85.44%	393	10.46%	40	1.06%	82	2.18%	28	0.75%	4	0.11%	2,817	74.98%	3,757
Trempealeau	3,957	80.46%	804	16.35%	9	0.18%	121	2.46%	20	0.41%	7	0.14%	3,153	64.11%	4,918
Vernon	4,370	81.68%	687	12.84%	9	0.17%	258	4.82%	0	0.00%	26	0.49%	3,683	68.84%	5,350
Vilas	1,952	80.03%	399	16.36%	18	0.74%	22	0.90%	48	1.97%	0	0.00%	1,553	63.67%	2,439
Walworth	2,828	57.75%	1,488	30.39%	22	0.45%	533	10.88%	9	0.18%	17	0.35%	1,340	27.36%	4,897
Washburn	1,652	82.15%	237	11.79%	16	0.80%	82	4.08%	17	0.85%	7	0.35%	1,415	70.36%	2,011
Washington	3,699	64.40%	1,978	34.44%	35	0.61%	31	0.54%	1	0.02%	0	0.00%	1,721	29.96%	5,744
Waukesha	7,228	58.32%	4,697	37.90%	115	0.93%	304	2.45%	47	0.38%	3	0.02%	2,531	20.42%	12,394
Waupaca	4,213	72.53%	1,422	24.48%	28	0.48%	132	2.27%	7	0.12%	7	0.12%	2,791	48.05%	5,809
Waushara	1,879	73.00%	571	22.18%	8	0.31%	91	3.54%	22	0.85%	3	0.12%	1,308	50.82%	2,574
Winnebago	7,555	49.61%	7,116	46.73%	157	1.03%	360	2.36%	38	0.25%	2	0.01%	439	2.88%	15,228
Wood	4,965	78.56%	1,113	17.61%	53	0.84%	172	2.72%	7	0.11%	10	0.16%	3,852	60.95%	6,320
Total	392,958	64.76%	170,020	28.02%	25,607	4.22%	14,818	2.44%	2,998	0.49%	424	0.07%	222,938	36.74%	606,825

==== Counties that flipped from Democratic to Republican ====
- Brown
- Calumet
- Dane
- Dodge
- Jefferson
- Kewaunee
- Manitowoc
- Ozaukee
- Portage
- Washington

==== Counties that flipped from Republican to Democratic ====
- Sheboygan

== Bibliography ==
- Gubernatorial Elections, 1787-1997. Washington, D.C.: Congressional Quarterly Inc. 1998. ISBN 1-56802-396-0.
- Kelly, Alice, ed. (1931). The Wisconsin Blue Book, 1931. Madison, Wisconsin: Democrat Printing Company, State Printer.
