= Herman L. Kronschnabl =

American politician and newspaper editor

Herman L. Kronschnabl (January 22, 1879 – November 8, 1943) was an American politician and newspaper editor.

Born in Germany, Kronschnabl and his parents emigrated to the United States in 1881. He was a railway mail clerk. However, he spent much of his life in the newspaper business. He was the editor and publisher of several papers, including the Clark County Herald, the Dorchester Clarion, the Forest Republican, and the Montello Express. While in Crandon, Wisconsin, Kronschnabl served on the Forest County, Wisconsin Board of Supervisors. In 1935, Kronschnabl served in the Wisconsin State Assembly and was a Progressive while still living in Crandon, Wisconsin. He also served as assessor of Mayville, Wisconsin and as village clerk and postmaster of Dorchester, Wisconsin from 1916 to 1925. Kronschnabl died in Stevens Point, Wisconsin.
