= Michael H. Hall =

American railroad engineer and politician

Michael H. Hall (August 24, 1890 – 1957) was a railroad engineer and politician.

Born in De Soto, Missouri, Hall went to high school in Mayville, New York. He started to work for Great Northern Railway as a locomotive engineer in Everett, Washington and was involved with the railroad labor union. Hall transferred to Superior, Wisconsin and continued to work for the railroad. He served in the Wisconsin State Assembly in 1935 and 1937 and was elected on the Wisconsin Progressive Party ticket.
