= Orland Steen Loomis =

American politician and 31st Governor of Wisconsin

Orland Loomis
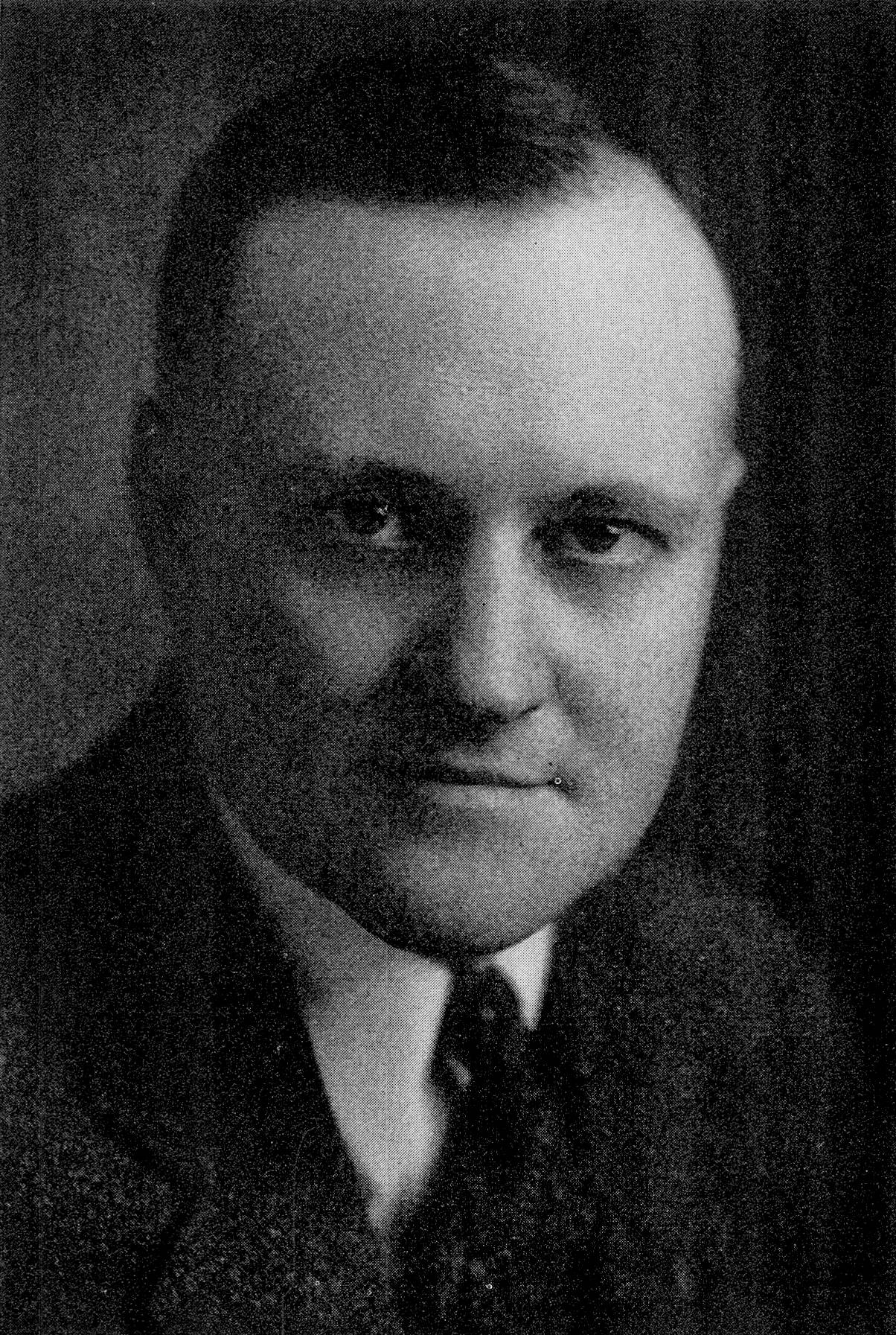

Governor-elect of Wisconsin
- Died before assuming office
- Preceded by: Julius P. Heil
- Succeeded by: Walter Samuel Goodland

28th Attorney General of Wisconsin
- In office January 4, 1937 – January 2, 1939
- Governor: Philip La Follette
- Preceded by: James E. Finnegan
- Succeeded by: John E. Martin

Member of the Wisconsin Senate from the 31st district
- In office January 5, 1931 – January 7, 1935
- Preceded by: Howard Teasdale
- Succeeded by: James Earl Leverich

Member of the Wisconsin State Assembly from the Juneau district
- In office January 7, 1929 – January 5, 1931
- Preceded by: Archibald Telfer
- Succeeded by: Ben Tremain

Personal details
- Born: Orland Steen Loomis; November 2, 1893 Mauston, Wisconsin, U.S.
- Died: December 7, 1942 (aged 49) Madison, Wisconsin, U.S.
- Party: Wisconsin Progressive (1934–1942); Republican (before 1934)
- Spouse: Florence Ely
- Children: 3
- Education: University of Wisconsin, Madison (LLB)

Military service
- Allegiance: United States
- Branch/service: United States Army
- Years of service: 1918–1919
- Rank: First Lieutenant
- Unit: American Expeditionary Forces
- Battles/wars: World War I

Orland Steen "Spike" Loomis (November 2, 1893 – December 7, 1942) was an American lawyer and progressive politician from Juneau County, Wisconsin. He was elected to be the 31st governor of Wisconsin in 1942, but died before taking office. He previously served as the 28th Attorney General of Wisconsin. He was elected as Attorney General and Governor running on the Wisconsin Progressive Party ticket, but had previously served in the State Senate and Assembly as a Republican.

== Biography ==
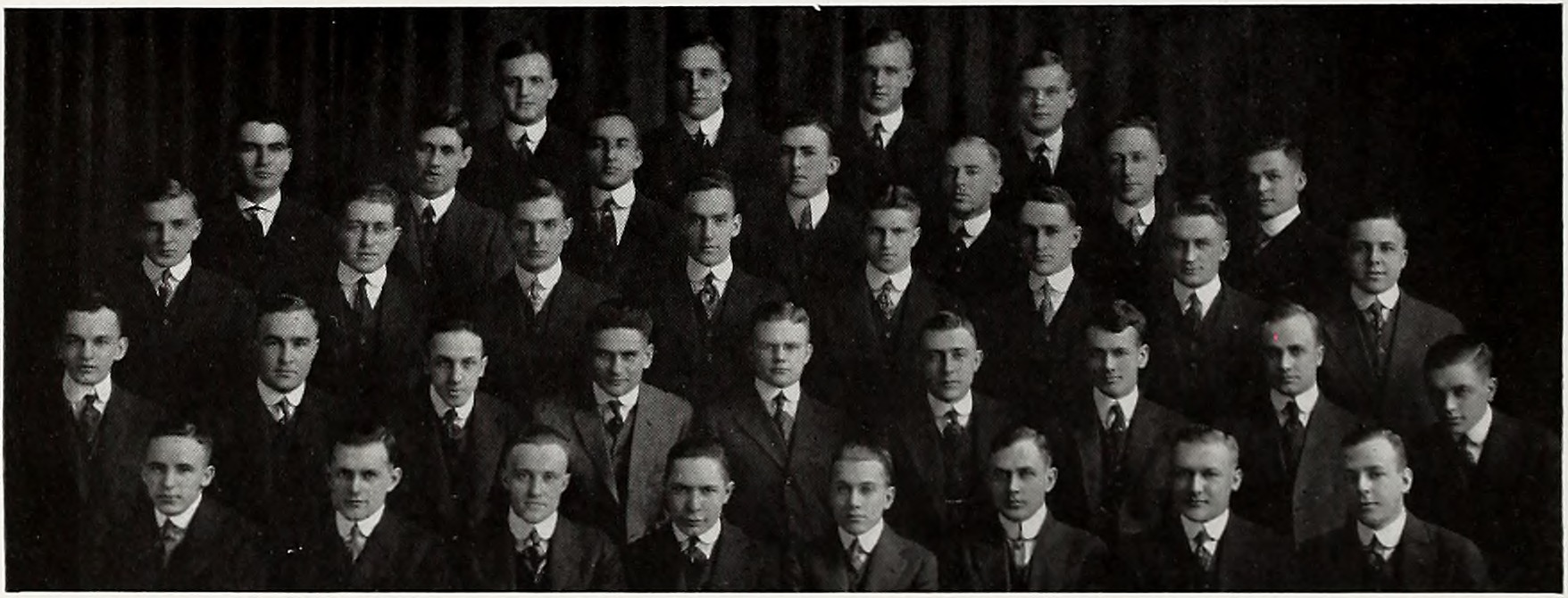
Loomis (front row, third from left) among members of Phi Alpha Delta at the University of Wisconsin, Madison, 1916

Orland Loomis was born in Mauston, Wisconsin. He attended Ripon College and then received his law degree from the University of Wisconsin Law School in 1917. He joined the United States Army in the midst of World War I and was stationed in France with the American Expeditionary Forces. After the war, he returned to Mauston to practice law, and also served as the city attorney from 1922 to 1931. He was elected to the Wisconsin State Assembly in 1928 and the Wisconsin State Senate in 1930, running on the Republican Party ticket.

In 1934, he joined the new Wisconsin Progressive Party, along with many other progressive Republicans. Rather than running for re-election in the Senate in 1934, he ran for the Progressive nomination for Attorney General of Wisconsin, but fell 10,000 votes short in the primary. Following his defeat, he accepted an appointment as the state director of the Rural Electrification Administration, and served in that role for two years. He ran again for Attorney General in 1936, and this time won the nomination and the general election. He served as Attorney General from 1937 through 1939, but was defeated running for re-election in the 1938 general election.

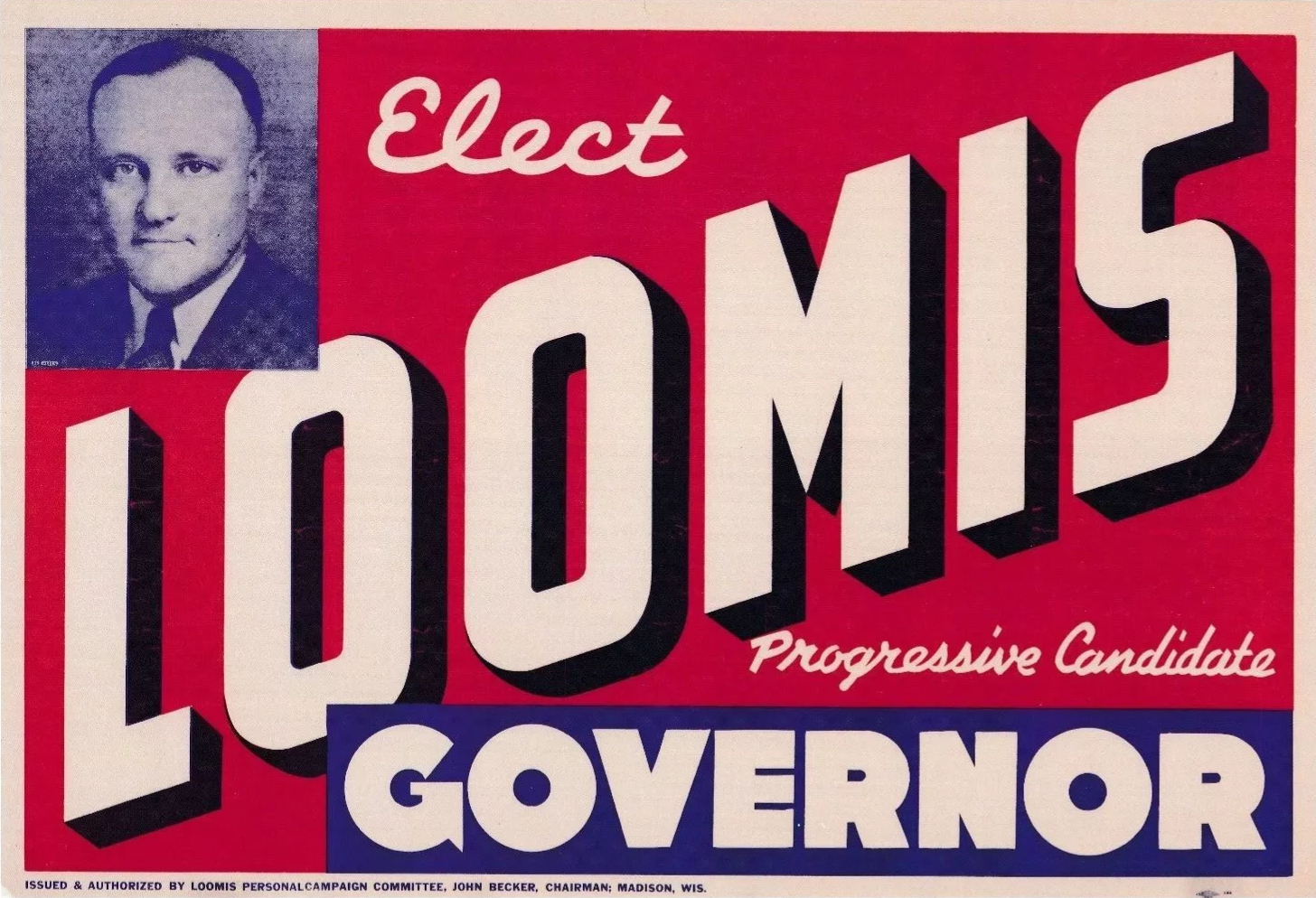
Loomis campaign poster, 1940

In 1940, he ran for Governor of Wisconsin, challenging the Republican incumbent Julius Heil. He fell 12,000 votes short in the general election. He ran again in 1942, and this time defeated Heil by over 100,000 votes. He died suddenly of a heart attack a month before he was to take office, and the Republican Lieutenant Governor Walter Samuel Goodland served all of Loomis's term as acting governor.

== Personal life and legacy ==
Loomis married Florence Marie Ely on June 22, 1918. They had three children. Orland Steen Loomis and his wife are buried in Mauston.

In 1943, the Liberty Ship SS Orland Loomis was named after him.

Loomis Road (Wisconsin Highway 36) in Milwaukee County is named after him.

== Electoral history ==
=== Wisconsin Assembly (1928) ===
Wisconsin Assembly, Juneau District Election, 1928
| Party | Candidate | Votes | % | ±% |
|---|---|---|---|---|
General Election, November 6, 1928
| Republican | Orland S. Loomis | 4,196 | 73.60% | |
| Democratic | Robert Timbers | 1,505 | 26.40% | |
| Plurality | | 2,691 | 47.20% | |
| Total votes | | 5,701 | 100.0% | +57.92% |
| Republican hold | | | | |

=== Wisconsin Senate (1930) ===
Wisconsin Senate, 31st District Election, 1930
| Party | Candidate | Votes | % | ±% |
|---|---|---|---|---|
Republican Primary, September 1930
| Republican | Orland S. Loomis | 9,030 | 56.42% | |
| Republican | Robert B. Wood | 4,153 | 25.95% | |
| Republican | Henry W. Barker | 1,791 | 11.19% | |
| Republican | Ernest T. Wyatt | 1,031 | 6.44% | |
| Plurality | | 4,877 | 30.47% | |
| Total votes | | 16,005 | 100.0% | |
General Election, November 4, 1930
| Republican | Orland S. Loomis | 9,940 | 96.62% | |
| Prohibition | A. C. Papst | 348 | 3.38% | |
| Plurality | | 9,592 | 93.23% | -5.62% |
| Total votes | | 10,288 | 100.0% | +2.92% |
| Republican hold | | | | |

=== Wisconsin Attorney General (1934, 1936, 1938) ===
Wisconsin Attorney General Election, 1934
| Party | Candidate | Votes | % | ±% |
|---|---|---|---|---|
Progressive Primary, September 1934
| Progressive | Fred M. Wylie | 53,643 | 39.29% | |
| Progressive | Orland S. Loomis | 43,260 | 31.68% | |
| Progressive | Walter A. Graunke | 39,629 | 29.03% | |
| Plurality | | 10,383 | 30.47% | |
| Total votes | | 136,532 | 100.0% | |

Wisconsin Attorney General Election, 1936
| Party | Candidate | Votes | % | ±% |
|---|---|---|---|---|
Progressive Primary, September 1936
| Progressive | Orland S. Loomis | 90,920 | 57.85% | +26.17% |
| Progressive | William H. Markham | 66,240 | 42.15% | |
| Plurality | | 24,680 | 15.70% | +8.10% |
| Total votes | | 157,160 | 100.0% | +15.11% |
General Election, November 3, 1936
| Progressive | Orland S. Loomis | 394,252 | 36.10% | +1.02% |
| Democratic | James E. Finnegan (incumbent) | 353,642 | 32.38% | −2.95% |
| Republican | Herman C. Runge | 339,502 | 31.09% | +8.43% |
| Socialist Labor | Abe Fisher | 4,691 | 0.43% | |
| Plurality | | 40,610 | 3.72% | +3.47% |
| Total votes | | 1,092,087 | 100.0% | +26.28% |

Wisconsin Attorney General Election, 1938
| Party | Candidate | Votes | % | ±% |
|---|---|---|---|---|
General Election, November 8, 1938
| Republican | John E. Martin | 431,678 | 48.04% | +16.96% |
| Progressive | Orland S. Loomis (incumbent) | 316,657 | 35.24% | −0.86% |
| Democratic | James E. Finnegan | 339,502 | 16.52% | −15.86% |
| Socialist Labor | Adolf Wiggert | 1,758 | 0.20% | −0.23% |
| Plurality | | 115,021 | 12.80% | +9.08% |
| Total votes | | 898,519 | 100.0% | -17.72% |

=== Wisconsin Governor (1940, 1942) ===
Wisconsin Gubernatorial Election, 1940
| Party | Candidate | Votes | % | ±% |
|---|---|---|---|---|
Progressive Primary, September 1940
| Progressive | Orland S. Loomis | 50,699 | 33.05% | |
| Progressive | Harold E. Stafford | 41,311 | 26.93% | |
| Progressive | Philip E. Nelson | 24,485 | 15.96% | |
| Progressive | Paul R. Alfonsi | 22,531 | 14.69% | |
| Progressive | Henry A. Gunderson | 14,372 | 9.37% | |
| Plurality | | 9,388 | 6.12% | -54.30% |
| Total votes | | 153,398 | 100.0% | -9.72% |
General Election, November 5, 1940
| Republican | Julius P. Heil (incumbent) | 558,678 | 40.67% | −14.72% |
| Progressive | Orland S. Loomis | 546,436 | 39.78% | +3.77% |
| Democratic | Francis E. McGovern | 264,985 | 19.29% | +11.30% |
| Communist | Fred Basset Blair | 2,340 | 0.17% | |
| Socialist Labor | Louis Fisher | 1,158 | 0.08% | −0.06% |
| | Scattering | 157 | 0.01% | +0.01% |
| Plurality | | 12,242 | 0.89% | -18.50% |
| Total votes | | 1,373,754 | 100.0% | +39.96% |

Wisconsin Gubernatorial Election, 1942
| Party | Candidate | Votes | % | ±% |
|---|---|---|---|---|
General Election, November 3, 1942
| Progressive | Orland S. Loomis | 397,664 | 49.65% | +9.87% |
| Republican | Julius P. Heil (incumbent) | 291,945 | 36.45% | −4.22% |
| Democratic | William C. Sullivan | 98,153 | 12.25% | −7.04% |
| Socialist | Frank Zeidler | 11,295 | 1.41% | |
| Communist | Fred Basset Blair | 1,092 | 0.14% | −0.03% |
| Socialist Labor | Georgia Cozzini | 490 | 0.06% | −0.02% |
| | Scattering | 346 | 0.04% | +0.03% |
| Plurality | | 105,719 | 13.20% | +12.31% |
| Total votes | | 800,985 | 100.0% | -41.69% |

Legal offices
| Preceded by James E. Finnegan | Attorney General of Wisconsin; 1937–1939 | Succeeded by John E. Martin |
Party political offices
| Preceded by Philip La Follette | Progressive nominee for Governor of Wisconsin; 1940, 1942 | Succeeded by Alexander Benz |
Political offices
| Preceded by Julius P. Heil | Governor-elect of Wisconsin; 1942 | Succeeded by Walter Samuel Goodland |
