= 1942 Wisconsin gubernatorial election =

- November 3, 1942
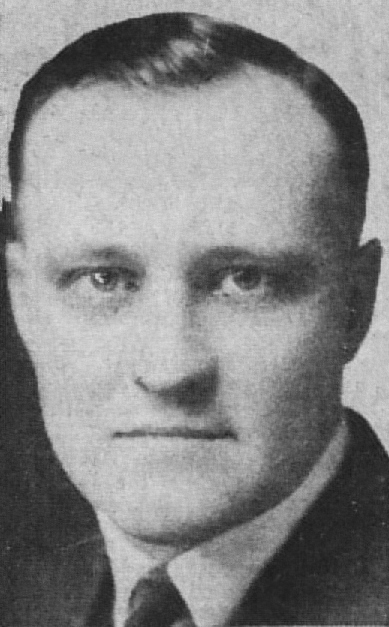

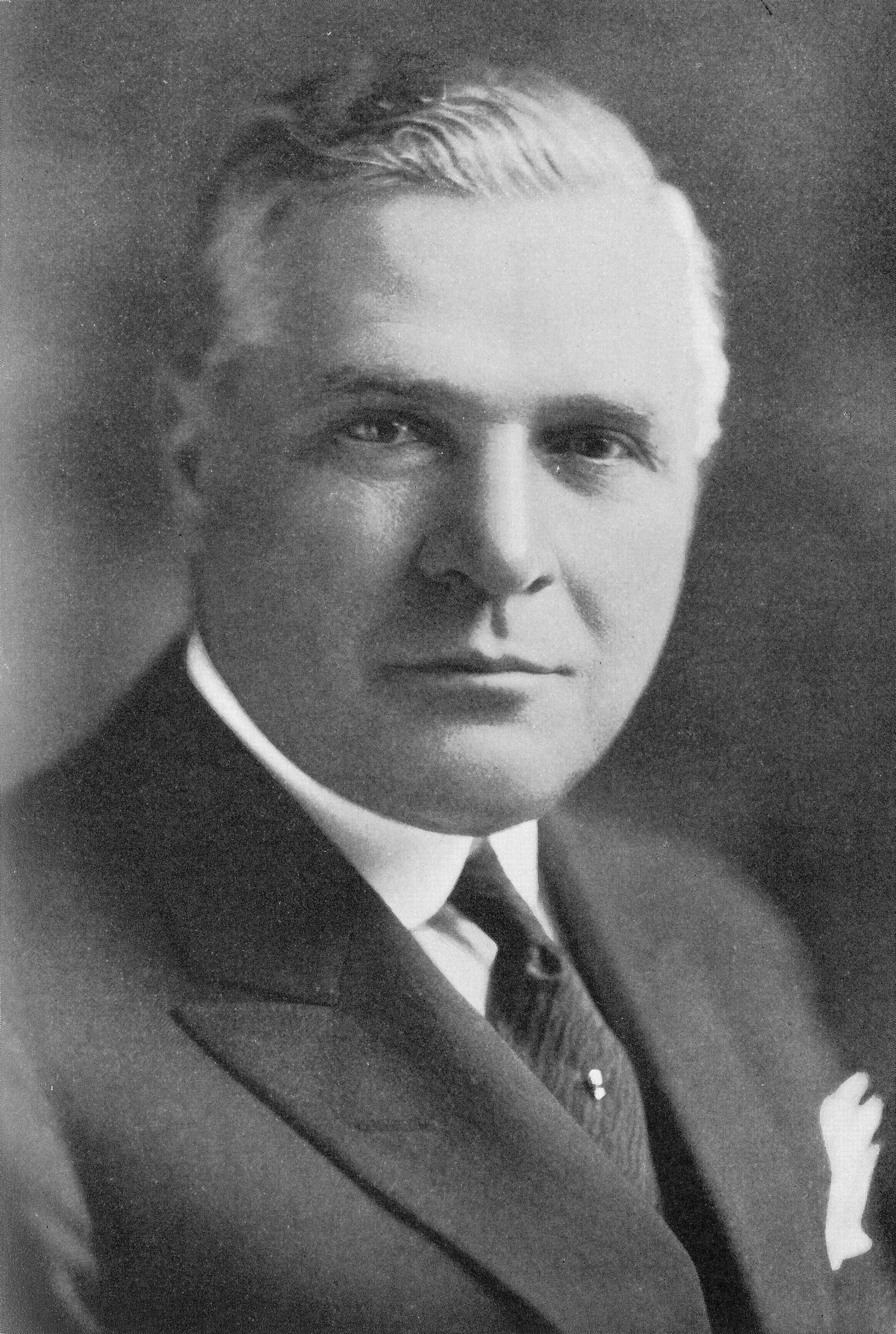

| Nominee | Orland S. Loomis | Julius P. Heil | William C. Sullivan |
| Party | Progressive | Republican | Democratic |
| Popular vote | 397,664 | 291,945 | 98,153 |
| Percentage | 49.65% | 36.45% | 12.25% |
- County results Loomis: 30–40% 40–50% 50–60% 60–70% 70–80% Heil: 40–50% 50–60%
Governor before election
Julius P. Heil
Republican
Elected Governor
Orland S. Loomis (Note: Orland S. Loomis was elected in the 1942 election, but died before taking office. Per a ruling of the Wisconsin Supreme Court Goodland, who had been re-elected lieutenant governor in the same election, served as governor for the entire term.)
Progressive

The 1942 Wisconsin gubernatorial election was held on November 3, 1942.

Incumbent Republican Governor Julius P. Heil was defeated by Progressive nominee Orland S. Loomis in a rematch of the 1940 election with 49.65% of the vote. As of 2023, this is the last time Waupaca and Dodge counties did not vote for the Republican candidate for governor. Primary elections were held on September 15, 1942.

Loomis died of a heart attack on December 7, 1942, a month before he was to take office. The Wisconsin Supreme Court ruled that Lieutenant Governor Walter Samuel Goodland would serve Orland Loomis's term as governor.

== Republican primary ==
=== Candidates ===
==== Nominee ====
- Julius P. Heil, incumbent governor

==== Eliminated in primary ====
- Milton T. Murray, state senator
- James K. Robinson, dentist, unsuccessful candidate for Progressive nomination for lieutenant governor in 1936 and unsuccessful candidate for Republican nomination for governor in 1940

=== Results ===
Republican primary results
| Party | Candidate | Votes | % |
|---|---|---|---|
| Republican | Julius P. Heil (incumbent) | 136,980 | 51.57% |
| Republican | Milton T. Murray | 95,908 | 36.11% |
| Republican | James K. Robinson | 32,740 | 12.33% |
| Total votes | | 265,628 | 100.00% |

== Progressive primary ==
=== Nominee ===
- Orland S. Loomis, former Attorney General of Wisconsin (1937–1939) and nominee for governor in 1940

=== Results ===
Progressive primary results
| Party | Candidate | Votes | % |
|---|---|---|---|
| Progressive | Orland S. Loomis | 54,508 | 100.00% |
| Total votes | | 54,508 | 100.00% |

== Democratic primary ==
=== Candidates ===
==== Nominee ====
- William C. Sullivan, dentist, former mayor of Kaukauna

==== Eliminated in primary ====
- Raymond J. Cannon, former U.S. Representative
- Joseph H. Conlin, concert singer
- Stanley Z. Fajkowski, former tavern keeper
- Gustav J. Keller, Democratic nominee for Attorney General of Wisconsin in 1940
- Albert J. Wilde, real estate broker

=== Results ===
Democratic primary results
| Party | Candidate | Votes | % |
|---|---|---|---|
| Democratic | William C. Sullivan | 15,684 | 24.31% |
| Democratic | Gustav J. Keller | 15,482 | 23.99% |
| Democratic | Raymond J. Cannon | 11,075 | 17.16% |
| Democratic | Stanley Z. Fajkowski | 10,333 | 16.01% |
| Democratic | Albert J. Wilde | 7,227 | 11.20% |
| Democratic | Joseph H. Conlin | 4,725 | 7.32% |
| Total votes | | 64,526 | 100.00% |

== Social-Democratic primary ==
=== Nominee ===
- Frank P. Zeidler, former county surveyor, member of the Milwaukee Board of School Directors

=== Results ===
Social-Democratic primary results
| Party | Candidate | Votes | % |
|---|---|---|---|
| Social-Democratic | Frank P. Zeidler | 5,666 | 100.00% |
| Total votes | | 5,666 | 100.00% |

== Other party nominations ==
- Fred Basset Blair, Independent Communist, Communist nominee for governor in 1932 and 1940
- Georgia Cozzini, Independent Socialist Labor

== General election ==
=== Results ===
1942 Wisconsin gubernatorial election
| Party | Candidate | Votes | % | ±% |
|---|---|---|---|---|
| Progressive | Orland S. Loomis | 397,664 | 49.65% | +9.87% |
| Republican | Julius P. Heil (incumbent) | 291,945 | 36.45% | −4.22% |
| Democratic | William C. Sullivan | 98,153 | 12.25% | −7.04% |
| Social-Democratic | Frank P. Zeidler | 11,295 | 1.41% | |
| Communist (Note: "Independent Communist") | Fred Basset Blair | 1,092 | 0.14% | −0.03% |
| Socialist Labor (Note: "Independent Socialist Labor") | Georgia Cozzini | 490 | 0.06% | −0.02% |
| | Scattering (Note: These are not listed in the Blue Book but are listed in the Board of Canvassers report.) | 346 | 0.04% | |
| Majority | | 105,719 | 13.20% | |
| Total votes | | 800,985 | 100.00% | |
| Progressive gain from Republican | | Swing | +14.09% | |

=== Results by county ===
Shawano County voted for the losing candidate for the first time since 1879 while Lafayette County and Price County voted for the losing candidate for the first time since 1892.

| County | Orland S. Loomis Progressive | | Julius P. Heil Republican | | William C. Sullivan Democratic | | Frank P. Zeidler Social-Democratic | | All Others Various | | Margin (Note: All margins are Loomis over Heil unless otherwise noted) | | Total votes cast |
| County | # | % | # | % | # | % | # | % | # | % | # | % | Total votes cast |
|---|---|---|---|---|---|---|---|---|---|---|---|---|---|
| Adams | 1,223 | 62.02% | 632 | 32.05% | 99 | 5.02% | 13 | 0.66% | 5 | 0.25% | 591 | 29.97% | 1,972 |
| Ashland | 3,443 | 59.52% | 1,808 | 31.25% | 486 | 8.40% | 25 | 0.43% | 23 | 0.40% | 1,635 | 28.26% | 5,785 |
| Barron | 4,179 | 64.15% | 1,986 | 30.49% | 296 | 4.54% | 32 | 0.49% | 21 | 0.32% | 2,193 | 33.67% | 6,514 |
| Bayfield | 2,490 | 60.79% | 1,234 | 30.13% | 325 | 7.93% | 32 | 0.78% | 15 | 0.37% | 1,256 | 30.66% | 4,096 |
| Brown | 7,527 | 39.26% | 7,223 | 37.68% | 4,328 | 22.58% | 85 | 0.44% | 8 | 0.04% | 304 | 1.59% | 19,171 |
| Buffalo | 2,284 | 58.93% | 1,476 | 38.08% | 97 | 2.50% | 17 | 0.44% | 2 | 0.05% | 808 | 20.85% | 3,876 |
| Burnett | 1,653 | 64.42% | 777 | 30.28% | 110 | 4.29% | 17 | 0.66% | 9 | 0.35% | 876 | 34.14% | 2,566 |
| Calumet | 1,638 | 36.68% | 1,987 | 44.49% | 796 | 17.82% | 40 | 0.90% | 5 | 0.11% | -349 | -7.81% | 4,466 |
| Chippewa | 4,430 | 49.08% | 4,081 | 45.21% | 480 | 5.32% | 22 | 0.24% | 13 | 0.14% | 349 | 3.87% | 9,026 |
| Clark | 4,220 | 57.26% | 2,707 | 36.73% | 383 | 5.20% | 45 | 0.61% | 15 | 0.20% | 1,513 | 20.53% | 7,370 |
| Columbia | 4,852 | 59.43% | 2,755 | 33.75% | 514 | 6.30% | 37 | 0.45% | 6 | 0.07% | 2,097 | 25.69% | 8,164 |
| Crawford | 1,675 | 29.81% | 2,521 | 44.87% | 1,393 | 24.80% | 28 | 0.50% | 1 | 0.02% | -846 | -15.06% | 5,618 |
| Dane | 30,394 | 74.05% | 8,841 | 21.54% | 1,577 | 3.84% | 207 | 0.50% | 24 | 0.06% | 21,553 | 52.51% | 41,043 |
| Dodge | 6,696 | 47.79% | 5,248 | 37.46% | 1,937 | 13.82% | 121 | 0.86% | 9 | 0.06% | 1,448 | 10.33% | 14,011 |
| Door | 1,582 | 47.84% | 1,433 | 43.33% | 265 | 8.01% | 20 | 0.60% | 7 | 0.21% | 149 | 4.51% | 3,307 |
| Douglas | 7,397 | 57.89% | 3,429 | 26.84% | 1,832 | 14.34% | 82 | 0.64% | 38 | 0.30% | 3,968 | 31.05% | 12,778 |
| Dunn | 2,989 | 52.50% | 2,450 | 43.04% | 220 | 3.86% | 17 | 0.30% | 17 | 0.30% | 539 | 9.47% | 5,693 |
| Eau Claire | 5,438 | 54.66% | 4,063 | 40.84% | 382 | 3.84% | 55 | 0.55% | 10 | 0.10% | 1,375 | 13.82% | 9,948 |
| Florence | 334 | 39.86% | 350 | 41.77% | 148 | 17.66% | 2 | 0.24% | 4 | 0.48% | -16 | -1.91% | 838 |
| Fond du Lac | 6,333 | 42.67% | 6,395 | 43.09% | 1,972 | 13.29% | 107 | 0.72% | 35 | 0.24% | -62 | -0.42% | 14,842 |
| Forest | 1,266 | 46.84% | 663 | 24.53% | 736 | 27.23% | 29 | 1.07% | 9 | 0.33% | 530 (Note: Loomis's margin over Sullivan) | 19.61% | 2,703 |
| Grant | 6,583 | 49.15% | 5,400 | 40.31% | 1,319 | 9.85% | 59 | 0.44% | 34 | 0.25% | 1,183 | 8.83% | 13,395 |
| Green | 3,667 | 58.95% | 2,200 | 35.36% | 292 | 4.69% | 37 | 0.59% | 25 | 0.40% | 1,467 | 23.58% | 6,221 |
| Green Lake | 1,541 | 39.78% | 1,727 | 44.58% | 584 | 15.07% | 15 | 0.39% | 7 | 0.18% | -186 | -4.80% | 3,874 |
| Iowa | 3,588 | 62.14% | 1,819 | 31.50% | 310 | 5.37% | 27 | 0.47% | 30 | 0.52% | 1,769 | 30.64% | 5,774 |
| Iron | 1,850 | 52.10% | 1,086 | 30.58% | 549 | 15.46% | 45 | 1.27% | 21 | 0.59% | 764 | 21.52% | 3,551 |
| Jackson | 3,157 | 69.69% | 1,237 | 27.31% | 121 | 2.67% | 12 | 0.26% | 3 | 0.07% | 1,920 | 42.38% | 4,530 |
| Jefferson | 4,925 | 46.24% | 4,271 | 40.10% | 1,359 | 12.76% | 81 | 0.76% | 16 | 0.15% | 654 | 6.14% | 10,652 |
| Juneau | 3,553 | 72.04% | 1,198 | 24.29% | 162 | 3.28% | 19 | 0.39% | 0 | 0.00% | 2,355 | 47.75% | 4,932 |
| Kenosha | 6,512 | 37.93% | 7,362 | 42.88% | 3,006 | 17.51% | 217 | 1.26% | 72 | 0.42% | -850 | -4.95% | 17,169 |
| Kewaunee | 1,522 | 33.89% | 1,903 | 42.37% | 1,033 | 23.00% | 27 | 0.60% | 6 | 0.13% | -381 | -8.48% | 4,491 |
| La Crosse | 7,611 | 50.99% | 6,209 | 41.60% | 1,028 | 6.89% | 55 | 0.37% | 23 | 0.15% | 1,402 | 9.39% | 14,926 |
| Lafayette | 2,145 | 43.74% | 2,155 | 43.94% | 585 | 11.93% | 13 | 0.27% | 6 | 0.12% | -10 | -0.20% | 4,904 |
| Langlade | 2,195 | 38.38% | 2,034 | 35.57% | 1,424 | 24.90% | 49 | 0.86% | 17 | 0.30% | 161 | 2.82% | 5,719 |
| Lincoln | 3,871 | 60.51% | 2,093 | 32.72% | 327 | 5.11% | 76 | 1.19% | 30 | 0.47% | 1,778 | 27.79% | 6,397 |
| Manitowoc | 8,292 | 52.83% | 5,613 | 35.76% | 1,656 | 10.55% | 126 | 0.80% | 10 | 0.06% | 2,679 | 17.07% | 15,697 |
| Marathon | 7,684 | 47.01% | 6,442 | 39.42% | 1,881 | 11.51% | 315 | 1.93% | 22 | 0.13% | 1,242 | 7.60% | 16,344 |
| Marinette | 2,140 | 27.40% | 4,063 | 52.02% | 1,545 | 19.78% | 56 | 0.72% | 6 | 0.08% | -1,923 | -24.62% | 7,810 |
| Marquette | 1,014 | 38.75% | 1,275 | 48.72% | 307 | 11.73% | 14 | 0.53% | 7 | 0.27% | -261 | -9.97% | 2,617 |
| Milwaukee | 103,650 | 50.83% | 62,701 | 30.75% | 30,230 | 14.82% | 6,546 | 3.21% | 787 | 0.39% | 40,949 | 20.08% | 203,914 |
| Monroe | 3,924 | 60.24% | 2,206 | 33.87% | 337 | 5.17% | 38 | 0.58% | 9 | 0.14% | 1,718 | 26.37% | 6,514 |
| Oconto | 3,222 | 42.57% | 3,004 | 39.69% | 1,284 | 16.97% | 52 | 0.69% | 6 | 0.08% | 218 | 2.88% | 7,568 |
| Oneida | 2,950 | 59.75% | 1,475 | 29.88% | 449 | 9.09% | 55 | 1.11% | 8 | 0.16% | 1,475 | 29.88% | 4,937 |
| Outagamie | 4,495 | 26.14% | 7,780 | 45.25% | 4,754 | 27.65% | 155 | 0.90% | 9 | 0.05% | -3,026 (Note: Heil's margin over Sullivan) | -17.60% | 17,193 |
| Ozaukee | 2,810 | 53.00% | 1,848 | 34.85% | 570 | 10.75% | 63 | 1.19% | 11 | 0.21% | 962 | 18.14% | 5,302 |
| Pepin | 673 | 46.45% | 690 | 47.62% | 79 | 5.45% | 4 | 0.28% | 3 | 0.21% | -17 | -1.17% | 1,449 |
| Pierce | 2,372 | 48.98% | 2,285 | 47.18% | 169 | 3.49% | 11 | 0.23% | 6 | 0.12% | 87 | 1.80% | 4,843 |
| Polk | 4,277 | 68.88% | 1,708 | 27.51% | 194 | 3.12% | 22 | 0.35% | 8 | 0.13% | 2,569 | 41.38% | 6,209 |
| Portage | 3,648 | 38.12% | 2,468 | 25.79% | 3,386 | 35.38% | 60 | 0.63% | 8 | 0.08% | 262 | 2.74% | 9,570 |
| Price | 2,269 | 43.01% | 2,320 | 43.98% | 552 | 10.46% | 64 | 1.21% | 70 | 1.33% | -51 | -0.97% | 5,275 |
| Racine | 11,673 | 44.04% | 11,000 | 41.50% | 3,500 | 13.21% | 271 | 1.02% | 61 | 0.23% | 673 | 2.54% | 26,505 |
| Richland | 2,417 | 48.73% | 2,116 | 42.66% | 385 | 7.76% | 14 | 0.28% | 28 | 0.56% | 301 | 6.07% | 4,960 |
| Rock | 8,306 | 48.29% | 7,662 | 44.55% | 1,153 | 6.70% | 50 | 0.29% | 29 | 0.17% | 644 | 3.74% | 17,200 |
| Rusk | 2,271 | 50.91% | 1,740 | 39.00% | 402 | 9.01% | 33 | 0.74% | 15 | 0.34% | 531 | 11.90% | 4,461 |
| Sauk | 5,390 | 57.89% | 3,319 | 35.65% | 500 | 5.37% | 70 | 0.75% | 32 | 0.34% | 2,071 | 22.24% | 9,311 |
| Sawyer | 1,255 | 42.33% | 1,349 | 45.50% | 334 | 11.26% | 20 | 0.67% | 7 | 0.24% | -94 | -3.17% | 2,965 |
| Shawano | 2,163 | 34.33% | 3,415 | 54.21% | 642 | 10.19% | 77 | 1.22% | 3 | 0.05% | -1,252 | -19.87% | 6,300 |
| Sheboygan | 7,653 | 37.11% | 8,499 | 41.22% | 3,894 | 18.88% | 518 | 2.51% | 57 | 0.28% | -846 | -4.10% | 20,621 |
| St. Croix | 3,098 | 49.62% | 2,359 | 37.78% | 751 | 12.03% | 32 | 0.51% | 4 | 0.06% | 739 | 11.84% | 6,244 |
| Taylor | 2,537 | 47.75% | 1,962 | 36.93% | 648 | 12.20% | 138 | 2.60% | 28 | 0.53% | 575 | 10.82% | 5,313 |
| Trempealeau | 3,204 | 62.27% | 1,683 | 32.71% | 243 | 4.72% | 9 | 0.17% | 6 | 0.12% | 1,521 | 29.56% | 5,145 |
| Vernon | 4,508 | 65.14% | 2,164 | 31.27% | 228 | 3.29% | 20 | 0.29% | 1 | 0.01% | 2,344 | 33.87% | 6,921 |
| Vilas | 1,308 | 40.71% | 1,134 | 35.29% | 723 | 22.50% | 33 | 1.03% | 15 | 0.47% | 174 | 5.42% | 3,213 |
| Walworth | 3,171 | 31.88% | 5,759 | 57.90% | 966 | 9.71% | 43 | 0.43% | 7 | 0.07% | -2,588 | -26.02% | 9,946 |
| Washburn | 1,466 | 55.28% | 999 | 37.67% | 170 | 6.41% | 12 | 0.45% | 5 | 0.19% | 467 | 17.61% | 2,652 |
| Washington | 2,827 | 40.17% | 3,231 | 45.91% | 902 | 12.82% | 78 | 1.11% | 0 | 0.00% | -404 | -5.74% | 7,038 |
| Waukesha | 7,999 | 47.24% | 7,475 | 44.15% | 1,299 | 7.67% | 147 | 0.87% | 12 | 0.07% | 524 | 3.09% | 16,932 |
| Waupaca | 3,423 | 47.25% | 3,149 | 43.46% | 601 | 8.30% | 63 | 0.87% | 9 | 0.12% | 274 | 3.78% | 7,245 |
| Waushara | 1,178 | 38.36% | 1,577 | 51.35% | 272 | 8.86% | 27 | 0.88% | 17 | 0.55% | -399 | -12.99% | 3,071 |
| Winnebago | 7,000 | 38.44% | 8,949 | 49.14% | 2,023 | 11.11% | 202 | 1.11% | 36 | 0.20% | -1,949 | -10.70% | 18,210 |
| Wood | 6,634 | 59.40% | 3,773 | 33.78% | 649 | 5.81% | 92 | 0.82% | 20 | 0.18% | 2,861 | 25.62% | 11,168 |
| Total | 397,664 | 49.65% | 291,945 | 36.45% | 98,153 | 12.25% | 11,295 | 1.41% | 1,928 | 0.24% | 105,719 | 13.20% | 800,985 |

==== Counties that flipped from Republican to Progressive ====
- Brown
- Chippewa
- Clark
- Dodge
- Door
- Green
- Jefferson
- La Crosse
- Langlade
- Manitowoc
- Marathon
- Oconto
- Ozaukee
- Pierce
- Racine
- Richland
- Rock
- Rusk
- St. Croix
- Taylor
- Vilas
- Waukesha
- Waupaca

==== Counties that flipped from Democratic to Progressive ====
- Forest

==== Counties that flipped from Progressive to Republican ====
- Kenosha

== Aftermath ==
=== State ex rel. Martin v. Heil ===
Following the certification of Loomis' election to the governor's office, he had begun holding necessary budget hearings, meeting with advisors and doing other duties tasked to the governor-elect. On December 7, 1942, He died suddenly of a heart attack a month before he was to take office.

In response to Loomis' death, both Heil and Goodland filed suit with the Wisconsin Supreme Court, with both arguing they were entitled to hold the office Loomis was elected to. Heil and many Republican leaders in the state argued that he should continue to serve as governor after the expiration of his term until a successor could be appointed or elected. Goodland on the other hand argued that as the lieutenant governor-elect, he was entitled to act as governor under the laws of Wisconsin at the time.

On December 29, the court reached a unanimous 6-0 decision. In an opinion authored by justice John D. Wickhem, the court ruled that Goodland would serve as acting governor for the duration of Loomis' term.

== Bibliography ==
- Glashan, Roy R. (1979). American Governors and Gubernatorial Elections, 1775-1978. Meckler Books. ISBN 0-930466-17-9.
- Ohm, Howard F.; Kuehn, Hazel L., eds. (1944). The Wisconsin Blue Book, 1944. State of Wisconsin.
