= Julius P. Heil =

American politician (1876–1949)

Julius Heil
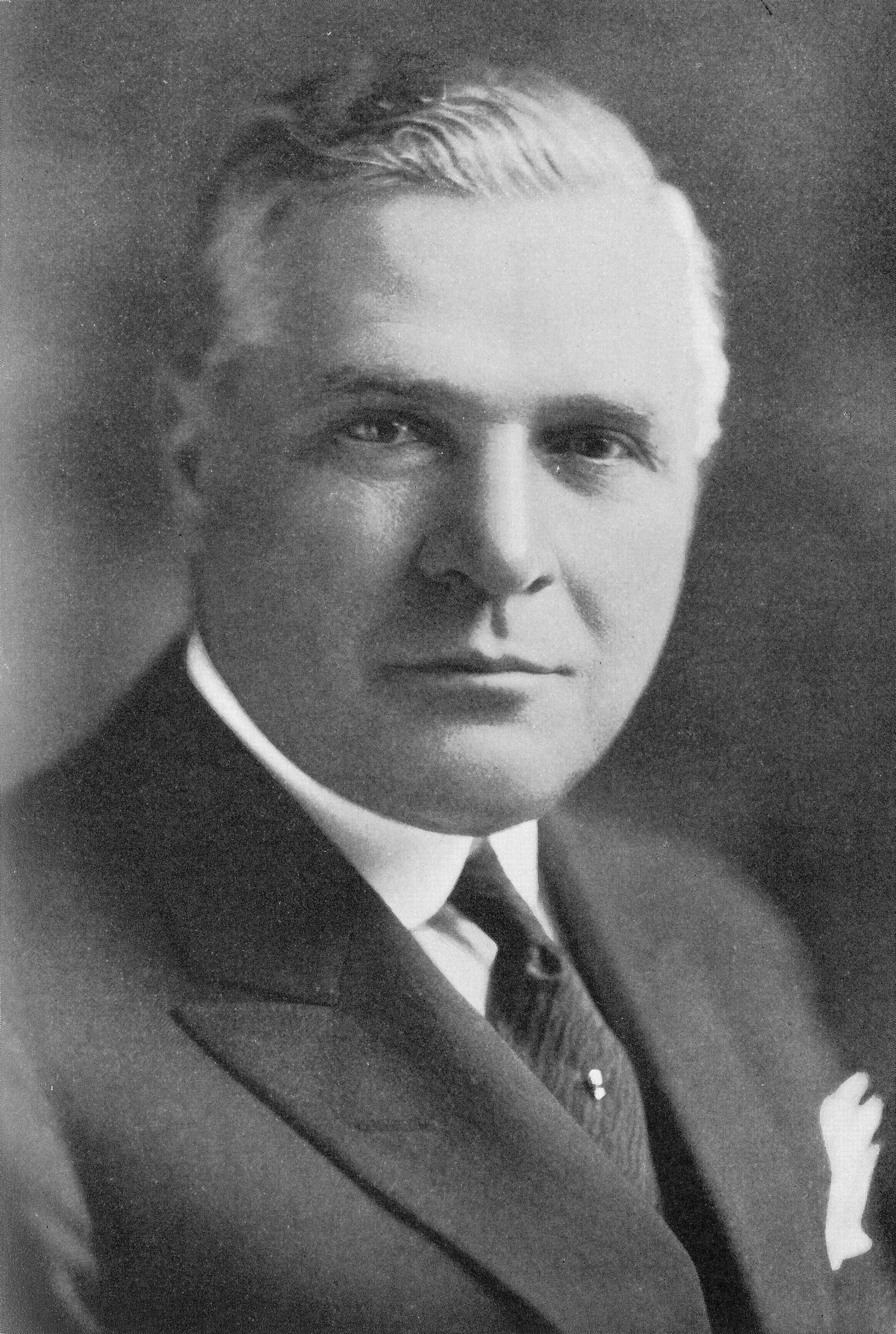

30th Governor of Wisconsin
- In office January 2, 1939 – January 4, 1943
- Lieutenant: Walter Goodland
- Preceded by: Philip La Follette
- Succeeded by: Orland Steen Loomis (elect); Walter Samuel Goodland

Personal details
- Born: Julius Peter Heil; July 24, 1876 Düssmund an der Mosel, Germany (now Brauneberg)
- Died: November 30, 1949 (aged 73) Milwaukee, Wisconsin, U.S.
- Party: Republican
- Spouse: Elizabeth Conrad (m. 1900)
- Children: 1

Julius Peter Heil (July 24, 1876 – November 30, 1949) was a German American immigrant, businessman, and Republican politician from Milwaukee, Wisconsin. He was the 30th governor of Wisconsin, serving from 1939 to 1943. Before his political career, he founded the Heil Company in Milwaukee.

== Early life ==
Heil, a Jewish immigrant to the United States, was born in Düssmund an der Mosel, Germany. As a child, he lived with his family on a farm in New Berlin, Wisconsin, and attended school until he was twelve.

== Career ==
Heil became qualified as an expert welder and traveled extensively in South America, installing welded steel track for streetcars. In 1901, he founded the Heil Company in Milwaukee, which fabricated steel tank cars. In 1933, he was appointed by President Franklin Roosevelt to head the state advisory board for the National Recovery Administration.

Winning the Republican gubernatorial nomination in 1938, Heil went on to defeat his Progressive opponent-incumbent Philip F. La Follette. As governor, he created the Department of Motor Vehicles out of five existing agencies and consolidated welfare and institutional programs under a single Department of Public Welfare. A controversial innovation was his creation of a Division of Departmental Research, designed to achieve greater efficiency in state administration. The United States entered World War II during Heil's second term, and a State Guard was created to replace the National Guard, which had been called to active duty. Often known as "Julius the Just," as governor, The New York Times reported that Heil was known for clowning and silly antics. He was re-elected in 1940, but lost to Progressive Orland Steen Loomis in 1942, according to the New York Times, because of his unpopular labor record.

After losing a third term as governor, Heil became president and later chairman of the board of the Heil Company. He toured the country to promote Wisconsin's dairy products.

== Death ==
Heil died of heart failure in Milwaukee on November 30, 1949, (age 73 years, 129 days). He is interred at Wisconsin Memorial Park, Brookfield, Wisconsin.

== Family life ==
Son of Frank and Barbara Heil, he married Elizabeth Conrad on June 4, 1900, and they had one son, Joseph F. Heil.

== Election results ==
- 1940 Wisconsin Republican gubernatorial primary results: Julius Heil, 223,819; James K. Robinson 106,570
- 1940 Wisconsin gubernatorial results: Julius Heil (R) defeated F.E. McGovern (D) and Orland S. Loomis
- 1942 Wisconsin gubernatorial results: Orland Loomis (Progressive) (R) defeated Julius Heil (R) and Dr. W. C. Sullivan

== See also ==
- List of United States governors born outside the United States

Party political offices
Preceded by Alexander Wiley	Republican nominee for Governor of Wisconsin; 1938, 1940, 1942	Succeeded by Walter Samuel Goodland
Political offices
Preceded by Philip La Follette	Governor of Wisconsin; 1939–1943	Succeeded by Orland Steen Loomis; Elect
