= Fred Basset Blair =

American politician (1906–2005)

- Born: October 4, 1906; Berlin, Wisconsin, U.S.
- Died: March 21, 2005 (aged 98)
- Education: University of Wisconsin
- Occupation: Politician
- Political party: Communist Party USA
- Spouse: Mary

Fred Basset Blair (October 4, 1906 – March 21, 2005) was born in Berlin, Wisconsin, in 1906. His family, of French-Canadian heritage, has lived in the state for more than 150 years.

Blair attended the University of Wisconsin as a Zona Gale scholar.

Becoming active in left wing politics, he joined the Communist Party USA in 1929, running for governor in 1930, 1932, 1940, 1942, 1966, and 1974. He also ran for U.S. Senator for Wisconsin in the 1938 election. Blair survived multiple investigations into his activities in the 1940s and 1950s and remained as the head of the Communist Party of Wisconsin into the 1970s. In the governor's race in 1974, he received 3,617 votes.

Blair and his wife Mary ran a bookstore in Milwaukee for 13 years; it was known at different times as Mary's Bookstore, Mark Twain Bookstore and The People's Bookstore. Blair was known for his poetry and love of literature.

In November 1966, a 17-year-old Brookfield Wisconsin youth entered Mary's Bookshop and tried to shoot Blair with a handgun. Blair was not wounded, although a book dealer in the store was shot during a scuffle with the assailant.
