= Political party strength in Wisconsin =

Politics in the US state of Wisconsin

The following tables indicate the historic party affiliation of elected officials in the U.S. state of Wisconsin, including: Governor, Lieutenant Governor, Secretary of State, Attorney General, State Treasurer, Superintendent of Public Instruction. The tables also indicate the historical party composition in the State Senate, State Assembly, the State delegation to the United States Senate, and the State delegation to the United States House of Representatives. For years in which a United States presidential election was held, the tables indicate which party's nominees received the state's electoral votes.

== By year ==
=== Wisconsin Territory: 1836–1848 ===
Year	Executive offices			Territorial Assemb.		U.S. Congress
Year	Governor	Secretary of State	Attorney General	Council	House	Delegate
1836	Henry Dodge (J)	John S. Horner	Henry S. Baird (W)	1	1	none
1837	Henry Dodge (J)	William B. Slaughter	Henry S. Baird (W)	1	1	George Wallace Jones (J)
1838	Henry Dodge (D)	William B. Slaughter	Henry S. Baird (W)	1	1	George Wallace Jones (D)
1839	Henry Dodge (D)	William B. Slaughter	Henry S. Baird (W)	2	2	James D. Doty (D)
1840	Henry Dodge (D)	William B. Slaughter	Horatio Wells (D)	2	2	James D. Doty (D)
1841	Henry Dodge (D)	Francis J. Dunn	Horatio Wells (D)	3	3	Henry Dodge (D)
1842	James Duane Doty (D)	Alexander Pope Field (W)	Mortimer M. Jackson (W)	3	3	Henry Dodge (D)
1843	James Duane Doty (D)	Alexander Pope Field (W)	Mortimer M. Jackson (W)	4	4	Henry Dodge (D)
1844	Nathaniel P. Tallmadge (W)	George R. C. Floyd	William Pitt Lynde (D)	4	4	Henry Dodge (D)
1845	Henry Dodge (D)	George R. C. Floyd	Mortimer M. Jackson (W)	4	4	Morgan L. Martin (D)
1846	Henry Dodge (D)	John Catlin (D)	A. Hyatt Smith (D)	4	4	Morgan L. Martin (D)
1847	Henry Dodge (D)	John Catlin (D)	A. Hyatt Smith (D)	5	5	John H. Tweedy (W)
1848	Henry Dodge (D)	John Catlin (D)	A. Hyatt Smith (D)	5	5	Henry Hastings Sibley (D)

=== 1848–1899 ===
Year	Executive offices						State Legislature		United States Congress			Electoral votes
Year	Governor	Lieutenant Governor	Secretary of State	Attorney General	Treasurer	Supt. of Pub. Inst.	Senate	Assembly	U.S. Senator (Class I)	U.S. Senator (Class III)	U.S. House	Electoral votes
1848	Nelson Dewey (D)	John Edwin Holmes (D)	Thomas McHugh (D)	James S. Brown (D)	Jairus C. Fairchild (D)	Eleazer Root (W)	16D, 3W	49D, 17W	Henry Dodge (D)	Isaac P. Walker (D)	2D	Cass/ Butler (D) ✗
1849	Nelson Dewey (D)	John Edwin Holmes (D)	Thomas McHugh (D)	James S. Brown (D)	Jairus C. Fairchild (D)	Eleazer Root (W)	14D, 4FS, 1W	36D, 16FS, 14W	Henry Dodge (D)	Isaac P. Walker (D)	1FS, 1W, 1D	Cass/ Butler (D) ✗
1850	Nelson Dewey (D)	Samuel Beall (D)	William A. Barstow (D)	S. Park Coon (D)	Jairus C. Fairchild (D)	Eleazer Root (W)	13D, 4W, 2FS	41D, 17W, 8FS	Henry Dodge (D)	Isaac P. Walker (D)	1FS, 1W, 1D	Cass/ Butler (D) ✗
1851	Nelson Dewey (D)	Samuel Beall (D)	William A. Barstow (D)	S. Park Coon (D)	Jairus C. Fairchild (D)	Eleazer Root (W)	14D, 3W, 2FS	46D, 11W, 9FS	Henry Dodge (D)	Isaac P. Walker (D)	2D, 1FS	Cass/ Butler (D) ✗
1852	Leonard J. Farwell (W)	Timothy Burns (D) (Note: Died in office.)	Charles D. Robinson (D)	Experience Estabrook (D)	Edward H. Janssen (D)	Azel P. Ladd (D)	13D, 5W, 1FS	31W, 28D, 6FS, 1 vac.	Henry Dodge (D)	Isaac P. Walker (D)	2D, 1FS	Pierce/ King (D) ✓
1853	Leonard J. Farwell (W)	vacant	Charles D. Robinson (D)	Experience Estabrook (D)	Edward H. Janssen (D)	Azel P. Ladd (D)	18D, 7W	51D, 22W, 7FS, 2I	Henry Dodge (D)	Isaac P. Walker (D)	3D	Pierce/ King (D) ✓
1854	William A. Barstow (D) (Note: Initially, Barstow was declared the winner of the 1855 election, but soon resigned amid claims that he had won through fraudulent means. MacArthur, as lieutenant governor, acted as governor for five days, until the Wisconsin Supreme Court declared Barstow's opponent, Bashford, the legitimate governor. Bashford completed the term, with MacArthur continuing to serve as lieutenant governor.)	James T. Lewis (D)	Alexander T. Gray (D)	George Baldwin Smith (D)	Edward H. Janssen (D)	Hiram A. Wright (D)	20D, 5W	50D, 25W, 8FS	Henry Dodge (D)	Isaac P. Walker (D)	3D	Pierce/ King (D) ✓
1855	William A. Barstow (D)	James T. Lewis (D)	Alexander T. Gray (D)	George Baldwin Smith (D)	Edward H. Janssen (D)	Hiram A. Wright (D)	13D, 12R	44R, 34D, 4I	Henry Dodge (D)	Charles Durkee (R)	2R, 1D	Pierce/ King (D) ✓
1856	William A. Barstow (D)	Arthur MacArthur Sr. (D)	David W. Jones (D)	William R. Smith (D)	Charles Kuehn (D)	A. Constantine Barry (D) (Note: Appointed to fill a vacancy.)	13R, 12D	45D, 36R, 1I	Henry Dodge (D)	Charles Durkee (R)	2R, 1D	Fremont/ Dayton (R) ✗
1856	Arthur MacArthur Sr. (D)	vacant	David W. Jones (D)	William R. Smith (D)	Charles Kuehn (D)	A. Constantine Barry (D)	13R, 12D	45D, 36R, 1I	Henry Dodge (D)	Charles Durkee (R)	2R, 1D	Fremont/ Dayton (R) ✗
1856	Coles Bashford (R)	Arthur MacArthur Sr. (D)	David W. Jones (D)	William R. Smith (D)	Charles Kuehn (D)	A. Constantine Barry (D)	13R, 12D	45D, 36R, 1I	Henry Dodge (D)	Charles Durkee (R)	2R, 1D	Fremont/ Dayton (R) ✗
1857	Coles Bashford (R)	Arthur MacArthur Sr. (D)	David W. Jones (D)	William R. Smith (D)	Charles Kuehn (D)	A. Constantine Barry (D)	19R, 11D	62R, 33D, 2I	James R. Doolittle (R)	Charles Durkee (R)	3R	Fremont/ Dayton (R) ✗
1858	Alexander Randall (R)	Erasmus D. Campbell (D)	David W. Jones (D)	Gabriel Bouck (D)	Samuel D. Hastings (R)	Lyman Draper (D)	18R, 12D	49R, 48D	James R. Doolittle (R)	Charles Durkee (R)	3R	Fremont/ Dayton (R) ✗
1859	Alexander Randall (R)	Erasmus D. Campbell (D)	David W. Jones (D)	Gabriel Bouck (D)	Samuel D. Hastings (R)	Lyman Draper (D)	16R, 14D	55R, 42D	James R. Doolittle (R)	Charles Durkee (R)	2R, 1D	Fremont/ Dayton (R) ✗
1860	Alexander Randall (R)	Butler Noble (R)	Louis P. Harvey (R)	James Henry Howe (R)	Samuel D. Hastings (R)	Josiah Little Pickard (R) (Note: Resigned to become Chicago superintendent of schools.)	17R, 13D	58R, 39D	James R. Doolittle (R)	Charles Durkee (R)	2R, 1D	Lincoln/ Hamlin (R) ✓
1861	Alexander Randall (R)	Butler Noble (R)	Louis P. Harvey (R)	James Henry Howe (R)	Samuel D. Hastings (R)	Josiah Little Pickard (R)	22R, 8D	70R, 27D	James R. Doolittle (R)	Timothy O. Howe (R)	3R	Lincoln/ Hamlin (R) ✓
1862	Louis P. Harvey (U)	Edward Salomon (U)	James T. Lewis (U)	Winfield Smith (R)	Samuel D. Hastings (R)	Josiah Little Pickard (R)	20R, 11D, 3U	44R, 33D, 23U (Note: Elected a Unionist, James W. Beardsley, as Speaker.)	James R. Doolittle (R)	Timothy O. Howe (R)	3R	Lincoln/ Hamlin (R) ✓
1862	Edward Salomon (U) (Note: As lieutenant governor, acted as governor for remainder of unexpired term.)	vacant	James T. Lewis (U)	Winfield Smith (R)	Samuel D. Hastings (R)	Josiah Little Pickard (R)	20R, 11D, 3U	44R, 33D, 23U	James R. Doolittle (R)	Timothy O. Howe (R)	3R	Lincoln/ Hamlin (R) ✓
1863	Edward Salomon (U)	vacant	James T. Lewis (U)	Winfield Smith (R)	Samuel D. Hastings (R)	Josiah Little Pickard (R)	18R, 16D, 1U	53R, 45D, 2U	James R. Doolittle (R)	Timothy O. Howe (R)	3D, 3R	Lincoln/ Hamlin (R) ✓
1864	James T. Lewis (NU)	Wyman Spooner (NU)	Lucius Fairchild (D)	Winfield Smith (R)	Samuel D. Hastings (R)	John G. McMynn (NU)	22NU, 11D	75NU, 25D	James R. Doolittle (R)	Timothy O. Howe (R)	3D, 3R	Lincoln/ Johnson (NU) ✓
1865	James T. Lewis (NU)	Wyman Spooner (NU)	Lucius Fairchild (D)	Winfield Smith (R)	Samuel D. Hastings (R)	John G. McMynn (NU)	25NU, 8D	67NU, 33D	James R. Doolittle (R)	Timothy O. Howe (R)	5R, 1D	Lincoln/ Johnson (NU) ✓
1866	Lucius Fairchild (NU)	Wyman Spooner (NU)	Thomas Allen (NU)	Charles R. Gill (NU)	William E. Smith (NU)	John G. McMynn (NU)	23NU, 10D	67NU, 33D	James R. Doolittle (R)	Timothy O. Howe (R)	5R, 1D	Lincoln/ Johnson (NU) ✓
1867	Lucius Fairchild (NU)	Wyman Spooner (NU)	Thomas Allen (NU)	Charles R. Gill (NU)	William E. Smith (NU)	John G. McMynn (NU)	22NU, 11D	74NU, 25D, 1WD	James R. Doolittle (R)	Timothy O. Howe (R)	5R, 1D	Lincoln/ Johnson (NU) ✓
1868	Lucius Fairchild (NU)	Wyman Spooner (NU)	Thomas Allen (NU)	Charles R. Gill (NU)	William E. Smith (NU)	Alexander J. Craig (R)	18R, 15D	59R, 41D	James R. Doolittle (R)	Timothy O. Howe (R)	5R, 1D	Grant/ Colfax (R) ✓
1869	Lucius Fairchild (NU)	Wyman Spooner (NU)	Thomas Allen (NU)	Charles R. Gill (NU)	William E. Smith (NU)	Alexander J. Craig (R)	19R, 14D	68R, 32D	Matthew H. Carpenter (R)	Timothy O. Howe (R)	5R, 1D	Grant/ Colfax (R) ✓
1870	Lucius Fairchild (NU)	Thaddeus C. Pound (R)	Llywelyn Breese (R)	Stephen Steele Barlow (R)	Henry Baetz (R)	Samuel Fallows (R)	19R, 11D, 3I	55R, 38D, 7I	Matthew H. Carpenter (R)	Timothy O. Howe (R)	5R, 1D	Grant/ Colfax (R) ✓
1871	Lucius Fairchild (NU)	Thaddeus C. Pound (R)	Llywelyn Breese (R)	Stephen Steele Barlow (R)	Henry Baetz (R)	Samuel Fallows (R)	19R, 14D	57R, 41D, 2I	Matthew H. Carpenter (R)	Timothy O. Howe (R)	4R, 2D	Grant/ Colfax (R) ✓
1872	Cadwallader C. Washburn (R)	Milton Pettit (R)	Llywelyn Breese (R)	Stephen Steele Barlow (R)	Henry Baetz (R)	Samuel Fallows (R)	23R, 9D, 1I	58R, 38D, 4I	Matthew H. Carpenter (R)	Timothy O. Howe (R)	4R, 2D	Grant/ Wilson (R) ✓
1873	Cadwallader C. Washburn (R)	vacant	Llywelyn Breese (R)	Stephen Steele Barlow (R)	Henry Baetz (R)	Samuel Fallows (R)	17R, 16D	60D, 40R	Matthew H. Carpenter (R)	Timothy O. Howe (R)	6R, 2D	Grant/ Wilson (R) ✓
1874	William Robert Taylor (D)	Charles D. Parker (D)	Peter Doyle (D)	A. Scott Sloan (R)	Ferdinand Kuehn (D)	Edward Searing (LR)	17R, 15D, 1I	64R, 35D, 4I	Matthew H. Carpenter (R)	Timothy O. Howe (R)	6R, 2D	Grant/ Wilson (R) ✓
1875	William Robert Taylor (D)	Charles D. Parker (D)	Peter Doyle (D)	A. Scott Sloan (R)	Ferdinand Kuehn (D)	Edward Searing (LR)	17R, 15D, 1I	60D, 40R	Angus Cameron (R)	Timothy O. Howe (R)	5R, 3D	Grant/ Wilson (R) ✓
1876	Harrison Ludington (R)	Charles D. Parker (D)	Peter Doyle (D)	A. Scott Sloan (R)	Ferdinand Kuehn (D)	Edward Searing (LR)	21R, 12D	49D, 47R, 4I (Note: Elected a Republican, Sam Fifield, as Speaker.)	Angus Cameron (R)	Timothy O. Howe (R)	5R, 3D	Hayes/ Wheeler (R) ✓
1877	Harrison Ludington (R)	Charles D. Parker (D)	Peter Doyle (D)	A. Scott Sloan (R)	Ferdinand Kuehn (D)	Edward Searing (LR)	21R, 12D	48R, 40D, 7GB, 4I, 1S (Note: Elected an independent, John B. Cassoday, as Speaker. He ran on a Unionist ticket.)	Angus Cameron (R)	Timothy O. Howe (R)	5R, 3D	Hayes/ Wheeler (R) ✓
1878	William E. Smith (R)	James M. Bingham (R)	Hans Warner (R)	Alexander Wilson (R)	Richard W. Guenther (R)	William Clarke Whitford (R)	24R, 9D	45R, 41D, 13GB, 1S (Note: Elected a Greenback, Augustus Barrows, as Speaker.)	Angus Cameron (R)	Timothy O. Howe (R)	5R, 3D	Hayes/ Wheeler (R) ✓
1879	William E. Smith (R)	James M. Bingham (R)	Hans Warner (R)	Alexander Wilson (R)	Richard W. Guenther (R)	William Clarke Whitford (R)	24R, 9D	66R, 25D, 9GB	Angus Cameron (R)	Matthew H. Carpenter (R)	5R, 3D	Hayes/ Wheeler (R) ✓
1880	William E. Smith (R)	James M. Bingham (R)	Hans Warner (R)	Alexander Wilson (R)	Richard W. Guenther (R)	William Clarke Whitford (R)	25R, 8D	70R, 29D, 1GB	Angus Cameron (R)	Matthew H. Carpenter (R)	5R, 3D	Garfield/ Arthur (R) ✓
1881	William E. Smith (R)	James M. Bingham (R)	Hans Warner (R)	Alexander Wilson (R)	Richard W. Guenther (R)	William Clarke Whitford (R)	24R, 9D	78R, 22D	Philetus Sawyer (R)	Angus Cameron (R)	5R, 3D	Garfield/ Arthur (R) ✓
1882	Jeremiah M. Rusk (R) (Note: During Rusk's first term, the Wisconsin Constitution was amended to provide that all elections of state and county officers would henceforth take place in even-numbered years. By the provisions of the amendment, the terms of all officials who would have left office in 1884, including Rusk, were extended by one year.)	Sam Fifield (R)	Ernst Timme (R)	Leander F. Frisby (R)	Edward C. McFetridge (R)	Robert Graham (R) (Note: Also nominated by the Democratic Party and the Prohibition Party.)	23R, 10D	64R, 34D, 2I	Philetus Sawyer (R)	Angus Cameron (R)	5R, 3D	Garfield/ Arthur (R) ✓
1883	Jeremiah M. Rusk (R)	Sam Fifield (R)	Ernst Timme (R)	Leander F. Frisby (R)	Edward C. McFetridge (R)	Robert Graham (R)	18R, 15D	63R, 37D	Philetus Sawyer (R)	Angus Cameron (R)	6D, 3R	Garfield/ Arthur (R) ✓
1884	Jeremiah M. Rusk (R)	Sam Fifield (R)	Ernst Timme (R)	Leander F. Frisby (R)	Edward C. McFetridge (R)	Robert Graham (R)	18R, 15D	63R, 37D	Philetus Sawyer (R)	Angus Cameron (R)	6D, 3R	Blaine/ Logan (R) ✗
1885	Jeremiah M. Rusk (R)	Sam Fifield (R)	Ernst Timme (R)	Leander F. Frisby (R)	Edward C. McFetridge (R)	Robert Graham (R)	20R, 13D	61R, 39D	Philetus Sawyer (R)	John Coit Spooner (R)	7R, 2D	Blaine/ Logan (R) ✗
1886	Jeremiah M. Rusk (R)	Sam Fifield (R)	Ernst Timme (R)	Leander F. Frisby (R)	Edward C. McFetridge (R)	Robert Graham (R)	20R, 13D	61R, 39D	Philetus Sawyer (R)	John Coit Spooner (R)	7R, 2D	Blaine/ Logan (R) ✗
1887	Jeremiah M. Rusk (R)	George Washington Ryland (R)	Ernst Timme (R)	Charles E. Estabrook (R)	Henry B. Harshaw (R)	Jesse B. Thayer (R)	25R, 6D, 1Pop, 1I	57R, 30D, 6Pop, 4ID, 3I	Philetus Sawyer (R)	John Coit Spooner (R)	7R, 1D, 1Lab	Blaine/ Logan (R) ✗
1888	Jeremiah M. Rusk (R)	George Washington Ryland (R)	Ernst Timme (R)	Charles E. Estabrook (R)	Henry B. Harshaw (R)	Jesse B. Thayer (R)	25R, 6D, 1Pop, 1I	57R, 30D, 6Pop, 4ID, 3I	Philetus Sawyer (R)	John Coit Spooner (R)	7R, 1D, 1Lab	Harrison/ Morton (R) ✓
1889	William D. Hoard (R)	George Washington Ryland (R)	Ernst Timme (R)	Charles E. Estabrook (R)	Henry B. Harshaw (R)	Jesse B. Thayer (R)	24R, 6D, 2UL, 1I	71R, 29D	Philetus Sawyer (R)	John Coit Spooner (R)	7R, 2D	Harrison/ Morton (R) ✓
1890	William D. Hoard (R)	George Washington Ryland (R)	Ernst Timme (R)	Charles E. Estabrook (R)	Henry B. Harshaw (R)	Jesse B. Thayer (R)	24R, 6D, 2UL, 1I	71R, 29D	Philetus Sawyer (R)	John Coit Spooner (R)	7R, 2D	Harrison/ Morton (R) ✓
1891	George Wilbur Peck (D)	Charles Jonas (D)	Thomas Cunningham (D)	James L. O'Connor (D)	John Hunner (D)	Oliver Elwin Wells (D)	19D, 14R	66D, 33R, 1UL	Philetus Sawyer (R)	William F. Vilas (D)	8D, 1R	Harrison/ Morton (R) ✓
1892	George Wilbur Peck (D)	Charles Jonas (D)	Thomas Cunningham (D)	James L. O'Connor (D)	John Hunner (D)	Oliver Elwin Wells (D)	19D, 14R	66D, 33R, 1UL	Philetus Sawyer (R)	William F. Vilas (D)	8D, 1R	Cleveland/ Stevenson (D) ✓
1893	George Wilbur Peck (D)	Charles Jonas (D)	Thomas Cunningham (D)	James L. O'Connor (D)	John Hunner (D)	Oliver Elwin Wells (D)	26D, 7R	56D, 44R	John L. Mitchell (D)	William F. Vilas (D)	6D, 4R	Cleveland/ Stevenson (D) ✓
1894	George Wilbur Peck (D)	Charles Jonas (D)	Thomas Cunningham (D)	James L. O'Connor (D)	John Hunner (D)	Oliver Elwin Wells (D)	26D, 7R	56D, 44R	John L. Mitchell (D)	William F. Vilas (D)	6D, 4R	Cleveland/ Stevenson (D) ✓
1895	William H. Upham (R)	Emil Baensch (R)	Henry Casson (R)	William H. Mylrea (R)	Sewell A. Peterson (R)	John Q. Emery (R)	20R, 13D	81R, 19D	John L. Mitchell (D)	William F. Vilas (D)	10R	Cleveland/ Stevenson (D) ✓
1896	William H. Upham (R)	Emil Baensch (R)	Henry Casson (R)	William H. Mylrea (R)	Sewell A. Peterson (R)	John Q. Emery (R)	20R, 13D	81R, 19D	John L. Mitchell (D)	William F. Vilas (D)	10R	McKinley/ Hobart (R) ✓
1897	Edward Scofield (R)	Emil Baensch (R)	Henry Casson (R)	William H. Mylrea (R)	Sewell A. Peterson (R)	John Q. Emery (R)	29R, 4D	90R, 9D, 1Fus	John L. Mitchell (D)	John Coit Spooner (R) (Note: Resigned.)	10R	McKinley/ Hobart (R) ✓
1898	Edward Scofield (R)	Emil Baensch (R)	Henry Casson (R)	William H. Mylrea (R)	Sewell A. Peterson (R)	John Q. Emery (R)	29R, 4D	90R, 9D, 1Fus	John L. Mitchell (D)	John Coit Spooner (R)	10R	McKinley/ Hobart (R) ✓
1899	Edward Scofield (R)	Jesse Stone (R)	William Froehlich (R)	Emmett R. Hicks (R)	James O. Davidson (R)	Lorenzo D. Harvey (R)	31R, 2D	81R, 19D	Joseph V. Quarles (R)	John Coit Spooner (R)	10R	McKinley/ Hobart (R) ✓

=== 1900–1949 ===
Year	Executive offices						State Legislature		United States Congress			Electoral votes
Year	Governor	Lieutenant Governor	Secretary of State	Attorney General	Treasurer	Supt. of Pub. Inst.	Senate	Assembly	U.S. Senator (Class I)	U.S. Senator (Class III)	U.S. House	Electoral votes
1900	Edward Scofield (R)	Jesse Stone (R)	William Froehlich (R)	Emmett R. Hicks (R)	James O. Davidson (R)	Lorenzo D. Harvey (R)	31R, 2D	81R, 19D	Joseph V. Quarles (R)	John Coit Spooner (R)	10R	McKinley/ Roosevelt (R) ✓
1901	Robert M. La Follette (R) (Note: La Follette nominated himself to Wisconsin's vacant U.S. Senate seat in 1905 and was confirmed by the state Senate; he held both offices, leaving the senate seat unfilled, until he resigned from the office of governor to take his seat in the Senate.)	Jesse Stone (R)	William Froehlich (R)	Emmett R. Hicks (R)	James O. Davidson (R)	Lorenzo D. Harvey (R)	31R, 2D	82R, 18D	Joseph V. Quarles (R)	John Coit Spooner (R)	10R	McKinley/ Roosevelt (R) ✓
1902	Robert M. La Follette (R)	James O. Davidson (R)	William Froehlich (R)	Emmett R. Hicks (R)	James O. Davidson (R)	Lorenzo D. Harvey (R)	31R, 2D	82R, 18D	Joseph V. Quarles (R)	John Coit Spooner (R)	10R	McKinley/ Roosevelt (R) ✓
1903	Robert M. La Follette (R)	James O. Davidson (R)	Walter Houser (R)	Lafayette M. Sturdevant (R)	John J. Kempf (R) (Note: Failed to give required bond.)	Charles P. Cary (R)	30R, 3D	75R, 25D	Joseph V. Quarles (R)	John Coit Spooner (R)	10R, 1D	McKinley/ Roosevelt (R) ✓
1904	Robert M. La Follette (R)	James O. Davidson (R)	Walter Houser (R)	Lafayette M. Sturdevant (R)	Thomas M. Purtell (R)	Charles P. Cary (R)	30R, 3D	75R, 25D	Joseph V. Quarles (R)	John Coit Spooner (R)	10R, 1D	Roosevelt/ Fairbanks (R) ✓
1905	Robert M. La Follette (R)	James O. Davidson (R)	Walter Houser (R)	Lafayette M. Sturdevant (R)	John J. Kempf (R)	Charles P. Cary (NP/R)	28R, 4D, 1SD	85R, 11D, 4SD	Joseph V. Quarles (R)	John Coit Spooner (R)	10R, 1D	Roosevelt/ Fairbanks (R) ✓
1906	James O. Davidson (R)	vacant	Walter Houser (R)	Lafayette M. Sturdevant (R)	John J. Kempf (R)	Charles P. Cary (NP/R)	28R, 4D, 1SD	85R, 11D, 4SD	Robert M. La Follette (R)	John Coit Spooner (R)	10R, 1D	Roosevelt/ Fairbanks (R) ✓
1907	James O. Davidson (R)	William D. Connor (R)	James A. Frear (R)	Frank L. Gilbert (R)	Andrew H. Dahl (R)	Charles P. Cary (NP/R)	27R, 5D, 1SD	76R, 19D, 5SD	Robert M. La Follette (R)	Isaac Stephenson (R)	9R, 2D	Roosevelt/ Fairbanks (R) ✓
1908	James O. Davidson (R)	William D. Connor (R)	James A. Frear (R)	Frank L. Gilbert (R)	Andrew H. Dahl (R)	Charles P. Cary (NP/R)	27R, 5D, 1SD	76R, 19D, 5SD	Robert M. La Follette (R)	Isaac Stephenson (R)	9R, 2D	Taft/ Sherman (R) ✓
1909	James O. Davidson (R)	John Strange (R)	James A. Frear (R)	Frank L. Gilbert (R)	Andrew H. Dahl (R)	Charles P. Cary (NP/R)	28R, 4D, 1SD	80R, 17D, 3SD	Robert M. La Follette (R)	Isaac Stephenson (R)	10R, 1D	Taft/ Sherman (R) ✓
1910	James O. Davidson (R)	John Strange (R)	James A. Frear (R)	Frank L. Gilbert (R)	Andrew H. Dahl (R)	Charles P. Cary (NP/R)	28R, 4D, 1SD	80R, 17D, 3SD	Robert M. La Follette (R)	Isaac Stephenson (R)	10R, 1D	Taft/ Sherman (R) ✓
1911	Francis E. McGovern (R)	Thomas Morris (R)	James A. Frear (R)	Levi H. Bancroft (R)	Andrew H. Dahl (R)	Charles P. Cary (NP/R)	27R, 4D, 2SD	59R, 29D, 12SD	Robert M. La Follette (R)	Isaac Stephenson (R)	8R, 2D, 1Soc	Taft/ Sherman (R) ✓
1912	Francis E. McGovern (R)	Thomas Morris (R)	James A. Frear (R)	Levi H. Bancroft (R)	Andrew H. Dahl (R)	Charles P. Cary (NP/R)	27R, 4D, 2SD	59R, 29D, 12SD	Robert M. La Follette (R)	Isaac Stephenson (R)	8R, 2D, 1Soc	Wilson/ Marshall (D) ✓
1913	Francis E. McGovern (R)	Thomas Morris (R)	John Donald (R)	Walter C. Owen (R)	Henry Johnson (R)	Charles P. Cary (NP/R)	23R, 9D, 1SD	57R, 37D, 6SD	Robert M. La Follette (R)	Isaac Stephenson (R)	8R, 3D	Wilson/ Marshall (D) ✓
1914	Francis E. McGovern (R)	Thomas Morris (R)	John Donald (R)	Walter C. Owen (R)	Henry Johnson (R)	Charles P. Cary (NP/R)	23R, 9D, 1SD	57R, 37D, 6SD	Robert M. La Follette (R)	Isaac Stephenson (R)	8R, 3D	Wilson/ Marshall (D) ✓
1915	Emanuel L. Philipp (R)	Edward Dithmar (R)	John Donald (R)	Walter C. Owen (R)	Henry Johnson (R)	Charles P. Cary (NP/R)	21R, 11D, 1SD	63R, 29D, 8SD	Robert M. La Follette (R)	Paul O. Husting (D)	8R, 3D	Wilson/ Marshall (D) ✓
1916	Emanuel L. Philipp (R)	Edward Dithmar (R)	John Donald (R)	Walter C. Owen (R)	Henry Johnson (R)	Charles P. Cary (NP/R)	21R, 11D, 1SD	63R, 29D, 8SD	Robert M. La Follette (R)	Paul O. Husting (D)	8R, 3D	Hughes/ Fairbanks (R) ✗
1917	Emanuel L. Philipp (R)	Edward Dithmar (R)	Merlin Hull (R)	Walter C. Owen (R)	Henry Johnson (R)	Charles P. Cary (NP/R)	24R, 6D, 3Soc	79R, 14D, 7Soc	Robert M. La Follette (R)	Paul O. Husting (D)	11R	Hughes/ Fairbanks (R) ✗
1918	Emanuel L. Philipp (R)	Edward Dithmar (R)	Merlin Hull (R)	Spencer Haven (R)	Henry Johnson (R)	Charles P. Cary (NP/R)	24R, 6D, 3Soc	79R, 14D, 7Soc	Robert M. La Follette (R)	Irvine Lenroot (R)	11R	Hughes/ Fairbanks (R) ✗
1919	Emanuel L. Philipp (R)	Edward Dithmar (R)	Merlin Hull (R)	John J. Blaine (R)	Henry Johnson (R)	Charles P. Cary (NP/R)	27R, 4Soc, 2D	79R, 16Soc, 5D	Robert M. La Follette (R)	Irvine Lenroot (R)	10R, 1Soc	Hughes/ Fairbanks (R) ✗
1920	Emanuel L. Philipp (R)	Edward Dithmar (R)	Merlin Hull (R)	John J. Blaine (R)	Henry Johnson (R)	Charles P. Cary (NP/R)	27R, 4Soc, 2D	79R, 16Soc, 5D	Robert M. La Follette (R)	Irvine Lenroot (R)	10R, 1Soc	Harding/ Coolidge (R) ✓
1921	John J. Blaine (R)	George Comings (R)	Elmer Hall (R)	William J. Morgan (R)	Henry Johnson (R)	John Callahan (NP)	27R, 4Soc, 2D	92R, 6Soc, 2D	Robert M. La Follette (R)	Irvine Lenroot (R)	11R	Harding/ Coolidge (R) ✓
1922	John J. Blaine (R)	George Comings (R)	Elmer Hall (R)	William J. Morgan (R)	Henry Johnson (R)	John Callahan (NP)	27R, 4Soc, 2D	92R, 6Soc, 2D	Robert M. La Follette (R)	Irvine Lenroot (R)	11R	Harding/ Coolidge (R) ✓
1923	John J. Blaine (R)	George Comings (R)	Fred R. Zimmerman (R)	Herman Ekern (R)	Solomon Levitan (R)	John Callahan (NP)	30R, 3Soc	89R, 10Soc, 1D	Robert M. La Follette (R)	Irvine Lenroot (R)	10R, 1Soc	Harding/ Coolidge (R) ✓
1924	John J. Blaine (R)	George Comings (R)	Fred R. Zimmerman (R)	Herman Ekern (R)	Solomon Levitan (R)	John Callahan (NP)	30R, 3Soc	89R, 10Soc, 1D	Robert M. La Follette (R)	Irvine Lenroot (R)	10R, 1Soc	La Follette/ Wheeler (Prog) ✗
1925	John J. Blaine (R)	Henry Huber (R)	Fred R. Zimmerman (R)	Herman Ekern (R)	Solomon Levitan (R)	John Callahan (NP)	29R, 4Soc	91R, 8Soc, 1D	Robert M. La Follette Jr. (R)	Irvine Lenroot (R)	10R, 1Soc	La Follette/ Wheeler (Prog) ✗
1926	John J. Blaine (R)	Henry Huber (R)	Fred R. Zimmerman (R)	Herman Ekern (R)	Solomon Levitan (R)	John Callahan (NP)	29R, 4Soc	91R, 8Soc, 1D	Robert M. La Follette Jr. (R)	Irvine Lenroot (R)	10R, 1Soc	La Follette/ Wheeler (Prog) ✗
1927	Fred R. Zimmerman (R)	Henry Huber (R)	Theodore Dammann (R)	John W. Reynolds Sr. (R)	Solomon Levitan (R)	John Callahan (NP)	31R, 2Soc	89R, 8Soc, 3D	Robert M. La Follette Jr. (R)	John J. Blaine (R)	10R, 1Soc	La Follette/ Wheeler (Prog) ✗
1928	Fred R. Zimmerman (R)	Henry Huber (R)	Theodore Dammann (R)	John W. Reynolds Sr. (R)	Solomon Levitan (R)	John Callahan (NP)	31R, 2Soc	89R, 8Soc, 3D	Robert M. La Follette Jr. (R)	John J. Blaine (R)	10R, 1Soc	Hoover/ Curtis (R) ✓
1929	Walter J. Kohler Sr. (R)	Henry Huber (R)	Theodore Dammann (R)	John W. Reynolds Sr. (R)	Solomon Levitan (R)	John Callahan (NP)	31R, 2Soc	91R, 5D, 3Soc, 1I	Robert M. La Follette Jr. (R)	John J. Blaine (R)	11R	Hoover/ Curtis (R) ✓
1930	Walter J. Kohler Sr. (R)	Henry Huber (R)	Theodore Dammann (R)	John W. Reynolds Sr. (R)	Solomon Levitan (R)	John Callahan (NP)	31R, 2Soc	91R, 5D, 3Soc, 1I	Robert M. La Follette Jr. (R)	John J. Blaine (R)	11R	Hoover/ Curtis (R) ✓
1931	Philip La Follette (R)	Henry Huber (R)	Theodore Dammann (R)	John W. Reynolds Sr. (R)	Solomon Levitan (R)	John Callahan (NP)	30R, 2Soc, 1D	88R, 9Soc, 3D	Robert M. La Follette Jr. (R)	John J. Blaine (R)	10R, 1D	Hoover/ Curtis (R) ✓
1932	Philip La Follette (R)	Henry Huber (R)	Theodore Dammann (R)	John W. Reynolds Sr. (R)	Solomon Levitan (R)	John Callahan (NP)	30R, 2Soc, 1D	88R, 9Soc, 3D	Robert M. La Follette Jr. (R)	John J. Blaine (R)	10R, 1D	Roosevelt/ Garner (D) ✓
1933	Albert G. Schmedeman (D)	Thomas J. O'Malley (D)	Theodore Dammann (R)	James E. Finnegan (D)	Robert Kirkland Henry (D)	John Callahan (NP)	23R, 9D, 1Soc	59D, 38R, 3Soc	Robert M. La Follette Jr. (R)	F. Ryan Duffy (D)	5D, 5R	Roosevelt/ Garner (D) ✓
1934	Albert G. Schmedeman (D)	Thomas J. O'Malley (D)	Theodore Dammann (R)	James E. Finnegan (D)	Robert Kirkland Henry (D)	John Callahan (NP)	23R, 9D, 1Soc	59D, 38R, 3Soc	Robert M. La Follette Jr. (R)	F. Ryan Duffy (D)	5D, 5R	Roosevelt/ Garner (D) ✓
1935	Philip La Follette (WP)	Thomas J. O'Malley (D)	Theodore Dammann (WP)	James E. Finnegan (D)	Robert Kirkland Henry (D)	John Callahan (NP)	14D, 13WP, 6R (Note: Elected a Democrat, Harry W. Bolens, as President Pro Tempore.)	45WP, 35D, 17R, 3Soc (Note: Elected a Progressive, Jorge W. Carow, as Speaker.)	Robert M. La Follette Jr. (WP)	F. Ryan Duffy (D)	7WP, 3D	Roosevelt/ Garner (D) ✓
1936	Philip La Follette (WP)	Henry Gunderson (WP) (Note: Resigned to take an appointment to the state tax commission.)	Theodore Dammann (WP)	James E. Finnegan (D)	Robert Kirkland Henry (D)	John Callahan (NP)	14D, 13WP, 6R	45WP, 35D, 17R, 3Soc	Robert M. La Follette Jr. (WP)	F. Ryan Duffy (D)	7WP, 3D	Roosevelt/ Garner (D) ✓
1937	Philip La Follette (WP)	Herman Ekern (WP)	Theodore Dammann (WP)	Orland Steen Loomis (WP)	Solomon Levitan (WP)	John Callahan (NP)	16WP, 9D, 8R (Note: Elected a Progressive, Walter J. Rush, as President Pro Tempore.)	46WP, 31D, 21R, 2Soc (Note: Elected a Progressive, Paul Alfonsi, as Speaker.)	Robert M. La Follette Jr. (WP)	F. Ryan Duffy (D)	7WP, 3D	Roosevelt/ Garner (D) ✓
1938	Philip La Follette (WP)	Herman Ekern (WP)	Theodore Dammann (WP)	Orland Steen Loomis (WP)	Solomon Levitan (WP)	John Callahan (NP)	16WP, 9D, 8R	46WP, 31D, 21R, 2Soc	Robert M. La Follette Jr. (WP)	F. Ryan Duffy (D)	7WP, 3D	Roosevelt/ Garner (D) ✓
1939	Julius P. Heil (R)	Walter Samuel Goodland (R)	Fred R. Zimmerman (R)	John E. Martin (R)	John M. Smith (R)	John Callahan (NP)	16R, 11WP, 6D	53R, 32WP, 15D	Robert M. La Follette Jr. (WP)	Alexander Wiley (R)	8R, 2WP	Roosevelt/ Garner (D) ✓
1940	Julius P. Heil (R)	Walter Samuel Goodland (R)	Fred R. Zimmerman (R)	John E. Martin (R)	John M. Smith (R)	John Callahan (NP)	16R, 11WP, 6D	53R, 32WP, 15D	Robert M. La Follette Jr. (WP)	Alexander Wiley (R)	8R, 2WP	Roosevelt/ Wallace (D) ✓
1941	Julius P. Heil (R)	Walter Samuel Goodland (R)	Fred R. Zimmerman (R)	John E. Martin (R)	John M. Smith (R)	John Callahan (NP)	23R, 6WP, 4D	60R, 25WP, 15D	Robert M. La Follette Jr. (WP)	Alexander Wiley (R)	6R, 3WP, 1D	Roosevelt/ Wallace (D) ✓
1942	Julius P. Heil (R)	Walter Samuel Goodland (R)	Fred R. Zimmerman (R)	John E. Martin (R)	John M. Smith (R)	John Callahan (NP)	23R, 6WP, 4D	60R, 25WP, 15D	Robert M. La Follette Jr. (WP)	Alexander Wiley (R)	6R, 3WP, 1D	Roosevelt/ Wallace (D) ✓
1943	Orland Steen Loomis (WP) (Note: Loomis was elected in 1942 but died before taking office. Per a ruling of the Wisconsin Supreme Court, Goodland, who had been re-elected lieutenant governor in the same election, acted as governor for the term.)	Walter Samuel Goodland (R)	Fred R. Zimmerman (R)	John E. Martin (R)	John M. Smith (R)	John Callahan (NP)	23R, 6WP, 4D	73R, 14D, 13WP	Robert M. La Follette Jr. (WP)	Alexander Wiley (R)	5R, 3D, 2WP	Roosevelt/ Wallace (D) ✓
1943	Walter Samuel; Goodland (R)	vacant	Fred R. Zimmerman (R)	John E. Martin (R)	John M. Smith (R)	John Callahan (NP)	23R, 6WP, 4D	73R, 14D, 13WP	Robert M. La Follette Jr. (WP)	Alexander Wiley (R)	5R, 3D, 2WP	Roosevelt/ Wallace (D) ✓
1944	Walter Samuel; Goodland (R)	vacant	Fred R. Zimmerman (R)	John E. Martin (R)	John M. Smith (R)	John Callahan (NP)	23R, 6WP, 4D	73R, 14D, 13WP	Robert M. La Follette Jr. (WP)	Alexander Wiley (R)	5R, 3D, 2WP	Dewey/ Bricker (R) ✗
1945	Walter Samuel; Goodland (R)	Oscar Rennebohm (R)	Fred R. Zimmerman (R)	John E. Martin (R)	John M. Smith (R)	John Callahan (NP)	22R, 6D, 5WP	75R, 19D, 5WP	Robert M. La Follette Jr. (WP)	Alexander Wiley (R)	7R, 2D, 1WP	Dewey/ Bricker (R) ✗
1946	Walter Samuel; Goodland (R)	Oscar Rennebohm (R)	Fred R. Zimmerman (R)	John E. Martin (R)	John M. Smith (R)	John Callahan (NP)	22R, 6D, 5WP	75R, 19D, 5WP	Robert M. La Follette Jr. (WP)	Alexander Wiley (R)	7R, 2D, 1WP	Dewey/ Bricker (R) ✗
1947	Oscar Rennebohm (R)	vacant	Fred R. Zimmerman (R)	John E. Martin (R)	John L. Sonderegger (R) (Note: Resigned to become State Insurance Commissioner.)	John Callahan (NP)	27R, 5D, 1WP	88R, 12D	Joseph McCarthy (R)	Alexander Wiley (R)	10R	Dewey/ Bricker (R) ✗
1948	Oscar Rennebohm (R)	vacant	Fred R. Zimmerman (R)	John E. Martin (R)	John L. Sonderegger (R)	John Callahan (NP)	27R, 5D, 1WP	88R, 12D	Joseph McCarthy (R)	Alexander Wiley (R)	10R	Dewey/ Bricker (R) ✗
1948	Oscar Rennebohm (R)	vacant	Fred R. Zimmerman (R)	Grover L. Broadfoot (R)	Clyde M. Johnston (NP)	John Callahan (NP)	27R, 5D, 1WP	88R, 12D	Joseph McCarthy (R)	Alexander Wiley (R)	10R	Truman/ Barkley (D) ✓
1949	Oscar Rennebohm (R)	George M. Smith (R)	Fred R. Zimmerman (R)	Thomas E. Fairchild (D)	Warren R. Smith (R)	George Earl Watson (NP)	28R, 5D	74R, 26D	Joseph McCarthy (R)	Alexander Wiley (R)	8R, 2D	Truman/ Barkley (D) ✓

=== 1950–1999 ===
Year	Executive offices						State Legislature		United States Congress			Electoral votes
Year	Governor	Lieutenant Governor	Secretary of State	Attorney General	Treasurer	Supt. of Pub. Inst.	Senate	Assembly	U.S. Senator (Class I)	U.S. Senator (Class III)	U.S. House	Electoral votes
1950	Oscar Rennebohm (R)	George M. Smith (R)	Fred R. Zimmerman (R)	Thomas E. Fairchild (D)	Warren R. Smith (R)	George Earl Watson (NP)	28R, 5D	74R, 26D	Joseph McCarthy (R)	Alexander Wiley (R)	8R, 2D	Truman/ Barkley (D)
1951	Walter J. Kohler Jr. (R)	George M. Smith (R)	Fred R. Zimmerman (R)	Vernon W. Thomson (R)	Warren R. Smith (R)	George Earl Watson (NP)	26R, 7D	76R, 24D	Joseph McCarthy (R)	Alexander Wiley (R)	9R, 1D	Truman/ Barkley (D)
1952	Walter J. Kohler Jr. (R)	George M. Smith (R)	Fred R. Zimmerman (R)	Vernon W. Thomson (R)	Warren R. Smith (R)	George Earl Watson (NP)	26R, 7D	76R, 24D	Joseph McCarthy (R)	Alexander Wiley (R)	9R, 1D	Eisenhower/ Nixon (R) ✓
1953	Walter J. Kohler Jr. (R)	George M. Smith (R)	Fred R. Zimmerman (R)	Vernon W. Thomson (R)	Warren R. Smith (R)	George Earl Watson (NP)	26R, 7D	75R, 25D	Joseph McCarthy (R)	Alexander Wiley (R)	9R, 1D	Eisenhower/ Nixon (R) ✓
1954	Walter J. Kohler Jr. (R)	George M. Smith (R)	Louis Allis (R)	Vernon W. Thomson (R)	Warren R. Smith (R)	George Earl Watson (NP)	26R, 7D	75R, 25D	Joseph McCarthy (R)	Alexander Wiley (R)	9R, 1D	Eisenhower/ Nixon (R) ✓
1955	Walter J. Kohler Jr. (R)	Warren P. Knowles (R)	Glenn Wise (R)	Vernon W. Thomson (R)	Warren R. Smith (R)	George Earl Watson (NP)	25R, 8D	64R, 36D	Joseph McCarthy (R)	Alexander Wiley (R)	7R, 3D	Eisenhower/ Nixon (R) ✓
1956	Walter J. Kohler Jr. (R)	Warren P. Knowles (R)	Glenn Wise (R)	Vernon W. Thomson (R)	Warren R. Smith (R)	George Earl Watson (NP)	25R, 8D	64R, 36D	Joseph McCarthy (R)	Alexander Wiley (R)	7R, 3D	Eisenhower/ Nixon (R) ✓
1957	Vernon W. Thomson (R)	Warren P. Knowles (R)	Robert C. Zimmerman (R)	Stewart G. Honeck (R)	Warren R. Smith (R)	George Earl Watson (NP)	23R, 10D	67R, 33D	William Proxmire (D)	Alexander Wiley (R)	7R, 3D	Eisenhower/ Nixon (R) ✓
1958	Vernon W. Thomson (R)	Warren P. Knowles (R)	Robert C. Zimmerman (R)	Stewart G. Honeck (R)	Dena A. Smith (R)	George Earl Watson (NP)	23R, 10D	67R, 33D	William Proxmire (D)	Alexander Wiley (R)	7R, 3D	Eisenhower/ Nixon (R) ✓
1959	Gaylord Nelson (D)	Philleo Nash (D)	Robert C. Zimmerman (R)	John W. Reynolds Jr. (D)	Eugene M. Lamb (D)	George Earl Watson (NP)	20R, 13D	55D, 45R	William Proxmire (D)	Alexander Wiley (R)	5D, 5R	Eisenhower/ Nixon (R) ✓
1960	Gaylord Nelson (D)	Philleo Nash (D)	Robert C. Zimmerman (R)	John W. Reynolds Jr. (D)	Eugene M. Lamb (D)	George Earl Watson (NP)	20R, 13D	55D, 45R	William Proxmire (D)	Alexander Wiley (R)	5D, 5R	Nixon/ Lodge (R) ✗
1961	Gaylord Nelson (D)	Warren P. Knowles (R)	Robert C. Zimmerman (R)	John W. Reynolds Jr. (D)	Dena A. Smith (R)	Angus B. Rothwell (NP)	20R, 13D	55R, 45D	William Proxmire (D)	Alexander Wiley (R)	6R, 4D	Nixon/ Lodge (R) ✗
1962	Gaylord Nelson (D)	Warren P. Knowles (R)	Robert C. Zimmerman (R)	John W. Reynolds Jr. (D)	Dena A. Smith (R)	Angus B. Rothwell (NP)	20R, 13D	55R, 45D	William Proxmire (D)	Alexander Wiley (R)	6R, 4D	Nixon/ Lodge (R) ✗
1963	John W. Reynolds Jr. (D)	Jack B. Olson (R)	Robert C. Zimmerman (R)	George Thompson (R)	Dena A. Smith (R)	Angus B. Rothwell (NP)	22R, 11D	53R, 47D	William Proxmire (D)	Gaylord Nelson (D)	6R, 4D	Nixon/ Lodge (R) ✗
1964	John W. Reynolds Jr. (D)	Jack B. Olson (R)	Robert C. Zimmerman (R)	George Thompson (R)	Dena A. Smith (R)	Angus B. Rothwell (NP)	22R, 11D	53R, 47D	William Proxmire (D)	Gaylord Nelson (D)	6R, 4D	Johnson/ Humphrey (D) ✓
1965	Warren P. Knowles (R)	Patrick Lucey (D)	Robert C. Zimmerman (R)	Bronson La Follette (D)	Dena A. Smith (R)	Angus B. Rothwell (NP)	20R, 13D	52D, 48R	William Proxmire (D)	Gaylord Nelson (D)	5D, 5R	Johnson/ Humphrey (D) ✓
1966	Warren P. Knowles (R)	Patrick Lucey (D)	Robert C. Zimmerman (R)	Bronson La Follette (D)	Dena A. Smith (R)	William C. Kahl (NP)	20R, 13D	52D, 48R	William Proxmire (D)	Gaylord Nelson (D)	5D, 5R	Johnson/ Humphrey (D) ✓
1967	Warren P. Knowles (R)	Patrick Lucey (D)	Robert C. Zimmerman (R)	Bronson La Follette (D)	Dena A. Smith (R)	William C. Kahl (NP)	21R, 12D	52R, 48D	William Proxmire (D)	Gaylord Nelson (D)	7R, 3D	Johnson/ Humphrey (D) ✓
1968	Warren P. Knowles (R)	Jack B. Olson (R)	Robert C. Zimmerman (R)	Bronson La Follette (D)	Harold W. Clemens (R)	William C. Kahl (NP)	21R, 12D	52R, 48D	William Proxmire (D)	Gaylord Nelson (D)	7R, 3D	Nixon/ Agnew (R) ✓
1969	Warren P. Knowles (R)	Jack B. Olson (R)	Robert C. Zimmerman (R)	Robert W. Warren (R)	Harold W. Clemens (R)	William C. Kahl (NP)	23R, 10D	52R, 48D	William Proxmire (D)	Gaylord Nelson (D)	6R, 4D	Nixon/ Agnew (R) ✓
1970	Warren P. Knowles (R)	Jack B. Olson (R)	Robert C. Zimmerman (R)	Robert W. Warren (R)	Harold W. Clemens (R)	William C. Kahl (NP)	23R, 10D	52R, 48D	William Proxmire (D)	Gaylord Nelson (D)	6R, 4D	Nixon/ Agnew (R) ✓
1971	Patrick Lucey (D)	Martin J. Schreiber (D)	Robert C. Zimmerman (R)	Robert W. Warren (R)	Charles P. Smith (D)	William C. Kahl (NP)	20R, 13D	67D, 33R	William Proxmire (D)	Gaylord Nelson (D)	5D, 5R	Nixon/ Agnew (R) ✓
1972	Patrick Lucey (D)	Martin J. Schreiber (D)	Robert C. Zimmerman (R)	Robert W. Warren (R)	Charles P. Smith (D)	William C. Kahl (NP)	20R, 13D	67D, 33R	William Proxmire (D)	Gaylord Nelson (D)	5D, 5R	Nixon/ Agnew (R) ✓
1973	Patrick Lucey (D)	Martin J. Schreiber (D)	Robert C. Zimmerman (R)	Victor A. Miller (D)	Charles P. Smith (D)	Barbara Thompson (NP)	18R, 15D	62D, 37R	William Proxmire (D)	Gaylord Nelson (D)	5D, 4R	Nixon/ Agnew (R) ✓
1974	Patrick Lucey (D)	Martin J. Schreiber (D)	Robert C. Zimmerman (R)	Bronson La Follette (D)	Charles P. Smith (D)	Barbara Thompson (NP)	18R, 15D	62D, 37R	William Proxmire (D)	Gaylord Nelson (D)	5D, 4R	Nixon/ Agnew (R) ✓
1975	Patrick Lucey (D)	Martin J. Schreiber (D)	Doug La Follette (D)	Bronson La Follette (D)	Charles P. Smith (D)	Barbara Thompson (NP)	19D, 14R	63D, 36R	William Proxmire (D)	Gaylord Nelson (D)	7D, 2R	Nixon/ Agnew (R) ✓
1976	Patrick Lucey (D)	Martin J. Schreiber (D)	Doug La Follette (D)	Bronson La Follette (D)	Charles P. Smith (D)	Barbara Thompson (NP)	19D, 14R	63D, 36R	William Proxmire (D)	Gaylord Nelson (D)	7D, 2R	Carter/ Mondale (D) ✓
1977	Martin J. Schreiber (D)	vacant	Doug La Follette (D)	Bronson La Follette (D)	Charles P. Smith (D)	Barbara Thompson (NP)	23D, 10R	66D, 33R	William Proxmire (D)	Gaylord Nelson (D)	7D, 2R	Carter/ Mondale (D) ✓
1978	Martin J. Schreiber (D)	vacant	Doug La Follette (D)	Bronson La Follette (D)	Charles P. Smith (D)	Barbara Thompson (NP)	23D, 10R	66D, 33R	William Proxmire (D)	Gaylord Nelson (D)	7D, 2R	Carter/ Mondale (D) ✓
1979	Lee S. Dreyfus (R)	Russell Olson (R)	Vel Phillips (D)	Bronson La Follette (D)	Charles P. Smith (D)	Barbara Thompson (NP)	21D, 12R	60D, 39R	William Proxmire (D)	Gaylord Nelson (D)	6D, 3R	Carter/ Mondale (D) ✓
1980	Lee S. Dreyfus (R)	Russell Olson (R)	Vel Phillips (D)	Bronson La Follette (D)	Charles P. Smith (D)	Barbara Thompson (NP)	21D, 12R	60D, 39R	William Proxmire (D)	Gaylord Nelson (D)	6D, 3R	Reagan/ Bush (R) ✓
1981	Lee S. Dreyfus (R)	Russell Olson (R)	Vel Phillips (D)	Bronson La Follette (D)	Charles P. Smith (D)	Herbert J. Grover (NP)	19D, 14R	58D, 40R, 1 vac. (Note: The 47th Assembly district was vacant for most of this term due to a resignation followed by a disputed special election.)	William Proxmire (D)	Bob Kasten (R)	5D, 4R	Reagan/ Bush (R) ✓
1982	Lee S. Dreyfus (R)	Russell Olson (R)	Vel Phillips (D)	Bronson La Follette (D)	Charles P. Smith (D)	Herbert J. Grover (NP)	19D, 14R	58D, 40R, 1 vac.	William Proxmire (D)	Bob Kasten (R)	5D, 4R	Reagan/ Bush (R) ✓
1983	Tony Earl (D)	James Flynn (D)	Doug La Follette (D)	Bronson La Follette (D)	Charles P. Smith (D)	Herbert J. Grover (NP)	19D, 14R	59D, 40R	William Proxmire (D)	Bob Kasten (R)	5D, 4R	Reagan/ Bush (R) ✓
1984	Tony Earl (D)	James Flynn (D)	Doug La Follette (D)	Bronson La Follette (D)	Charles P. Smith (D)	Herbert J. Grover (NP)	19D, 14R	59D, 40R	William Proxmire (D)	Bob Kasten (R)	5D, 4R	Reagan/ Bush (R) ✓
1985	Tony Earl (D)	James Flynn (D)	Doug La Follette (D)	Bronson La Follette (D)	Charles P. Smith (D)	Herbert J. Grover (NP)	19D, 14R	52D, 47R	William Proxmire (D)	Bob Kasten (R)	5D, 4R	Reagan/ Bush (R) ✓
1986	Tony Earl (D)	James Flynn (D)	Doug La Follette (D)	Bronson La Follette (D)	Charles P. Smith (D)	Herbert J. Grover (NP)	19D, 14R	52D, 47R	William Proxmire (D)	Bob Kasten (R)	5D, 4R	Reagan/ Bush (R) ✓
1987	Tommy Thompson (R)	Scott McCallum (R)	Doug La Follette (D)	Don Hanaway (R)	Charles P. Smith (D)	Herbert J. Grover (NP)	19D, 14R	54D, 45R	William Proxmire (D)	Bob Kasten (R)	5D, 4R	Reagan/ Bush (R) ✓
1988	Tommy Thompson (R)	Scott McCallum (R)	Doug La Follette (D)	Don Hanaway (R)	Charles P. Smith (D)	Herbert J. Grover (NP)	19D, 14R	54D, 45R	William Proxmire (D)	Bob Kasten (R)	5D, 4R	Dukakis/ Bentsen (D) ✗
1989	Tommy Thompson (R)	Scott McCallum (R)	Doug La Follette (D)	Don Hanaway (R)	Charles P. Smith (D)	Herbert J. Grover (NP)	20D, 13R	56D, 43R	Herb Kohl (D)	Bob Kasten (R)	5D, 4R	Dukakis/ Bentsen (D) ✗
1990	Tommy Thompson (R)	Scott McCallum (R)	Doug La Follette (D)	Don Hanaway (R)	Charles P. Smith (D)	Herbert J. Grover (NP)	20D, 13R	56D, 43R	Herb Kohl (D)	Bob Kasten (R)	5D, 4R	Dukakis/ Bentsen (D) ✗
1991	Tommy Thompson (R)	Scott McCallum (R)	Doug La Follette (D)	Jim Doyle (D)	Cathy Zeuske (R)	Herbert J. Grover (NP)	19D, 14R	58D, 41R	Herb Kohl (D)	Bob Kasten (R)	5R, 4D	Dukakis/ Bentsen (D) ✗
1992	Tommy Thompson (R)	Scott McCallum (R)	Doug La Follette (D)	Jim Doyle (D)	Cathy Zeuske (R)	Herbert J. Grover (NP)	19D, 14R	58D, 41R	Herb Kohl (D)	Bob Kasten (R)	5R, 4D	Clinton/ Gore (D) ✓
1993	Tommy Thompson (R)	Scott McCallum (R)	Doug La Follette (D)	Jim Doyle (D)	Cathy Zeuske (R)	Lee S. Dreyfus (NP/R)	18D, 15R	52D, 47R	Herb Kohl (D)	Russ Feingold (D)	5R, 4D	Clinton/ Gore (D) ✓
1993	Tommy Thompson (R)	Scott McCallum (R)	Doug La Follette (D)	Jim Doyle (D)	Cathy Zeuske (R)	John T. Benson (NP)	17R, 16D (Note: On April 6, 1993, three special elections were held, and in two of them, Republicans flipped the seats to their control, and thus took control of the chamber on April 20.)	52D, 47R	Herb Kohl (D)	Russ Feingold (D)	5R, 4D	Clinton/ Gore (D) ✓
1994	Tommy Thompson (R)	Scott McCallum (R)	Doug La Follette (D)	Jim Doyle (D)	Cathy Zeuske (R)	John T. Benson (NP)	17R, 16D	52D, 47R	Herb Kohl (D)	Russ Feingold (D)	5R, 4D	Clinton/ Gore (D) ✓
1995	Tommy Thompson (R)	Scott McCallum (R)	Doug La Follette (D)	Jim Doyle (D)	Jack Voight (R)	John T. Benson (NP)	17R, 16D	51R, 48D	Herb Kohl (D)	Russ Feingold (D)	6R, 3D	Clinton/ Gore (D) ✓
1996	Tommy Thompson (R)	Scott McCallum (R)	Doug La Follette (D)	Jim Doyle (D)	Jack Voight (R)	John T. Benson (NP)	17R, 16D	51R, 48D	Herb Kohl (D)	Russ Feingold (D)	6R, 3D	Clinton/ Gore (D) ✓
1996	Tommy Thompson (R)	Scott McCallum (R)	Doug La Follette (D)	Jim Doyle (D)	Jack Voight (R)	John T. Benson (NP)	17D, 16R (Note: On June 4, 1996, a special election was held, and Democrats flipped the seat to their control, and thus took control of the chamber on June 19.)	51R, 48D	Herb Kohl (D)	Russ Feingold (D)	6R, 3D	Clinton/ Gore (D) ✓
1997	Tommy Thompson (R)	Scott McCallum (R)	Doug La Follette (D)	Jim Doyle (D)	Jack Voight (R)	John T. Benson (NP)	17D, 16R	52R, 47D	Herb Kohl (D)	Russ Feingold (D)	5D, 4R	Clinton/ Gore (D) ✓
1998	Tommy Thompson (R)	Scott McCallum (R)	Doug La Follette (D)	Jim Doyle (D)	Jack Voight (R)	John T. Benson (NP)	17D, 16R	52R, 47D	Herb Kohl (D)	Russ Feingold (D)	5D, 4R	Clinton/ Gore (D) ✓
1998	Tommy Thompson (R)	Scott McCallum (R)	Doug La Follette (D)	Jim Doyle (D)	Jack Voight (R)	John T. Benson (NP)	17R, 16D (Note: On April 7, 1998, a special election was held, and Republicans flipped the seat to their control, and thus took control of the chamber on April 20.)	52R, 47D	Herb Kohl (D)	Russ Feingold (D)	5D, 4R	Clinton/ Gore (D) ✓
1999	Tommy Thompson (R)	Scott McCallum (R)	Doug La Follette (D)	Jim Doyle (D)	Jack Voight (R)	John T. Benson (NP)	17D, 16R	54R, 45D	Herb Kohl (D)	Russ Feingold (D)	5D, 4R	Clinton/ Gore (D) ✓

=== 2000–present ===
Year	Executive offices						State Legislature		United States Congress			Electoral votes
Year	Governor	Lieutenant Governor	Secretary of State	Attorney General	Treasurer	Sup. of Pub. Inst.	Senate	Assembly	U.S. Senator (Class I)	U.S. Senator (Class III)	U.S. House	Electoral votes
2000	Tommy Thompson (R) (Note: Resigned to become United States Secretary of Health and Human Services.)	Scott McCallum (R)	Doug La Follette (D)	Jim Doyle (D)	Jack Voight (R)	John T. Benson (NP/D)	17D, 16R	54R, 45D	Herb Kohl (D)	Russ Feingold (D)	5D, 4R	Gore/ Lieberman (D) ✗
2001	Scott McCallum (R) (Note: Ascended to the governorship upon Gov. Thompson's resignation.)	Margaret Farrow (R)	Doug La Follette (D)	Jim Doyle (D)	Jack Voight (R)	Elizabeth Burmaster (NP/D)	18D, 15R	56R, 43D	Herb Kohl (D)	Russ Feingold (D)	5D, 4R	Gore/ Lieberman (D) ✗
2002	Scott McCallum (R)	Margaret Farrow (R)	Doug La Follette (D)	Jim Doyle (D)	Jack Voight (R)	Elizabeth Burmaster (NP/D)	18D, 15R	56R, 43D	Herb Kohl (D)	Russ Feingold (D)	5D, 4R	Gore/ Lieberman (D) ✗
2003	Jim Doyle (D)	Barbara Lawton (D)	Doug La Follette (D)	Peg Lautenschlager (D)	Jack Voight (R)	Elizabeth Burmaster (NP/D)	18R, 15D	58R, 41D	Herb Kohl (D)	Russ Feingold (D)	4R, 4D	Gore/ Lieberman (D) ✗
2004	Jim Doyle (D)	Barbara Lawton (D)	Doug La Follette (D)	Peg Lautenschlager (D)	Jack Voight (R)	Elizabeth Burmaster (NP/D)	18R, 15D	58R, 41D	Herb Kohl (D)	Russ Feingold (D)	4R, 4D	Kerry/ Edwards (D) ✗
2005	Jim Doyle (D)	Barbara Lawton (D)	Doug La Follette (D)	Peg Lautenschlager (D)	Jack Voight (R)	Elizabeth Burmaster (NP/D)	19R, 14D	60R, 39D	Herb Kohl (D)	Russ Feingold (D)	4R, 4D	Kerry/ Edwards (D) ✗
2006	Jim Doyle (D)	Barbara Lawton (D)	Doug La Follette (D)	Peg Lautenschlager (D)	Jack Voight (R)	Elizabeth Burmaster (NP/D)	19R, 14D	60R, 39D	Herb Kohl (D)	Russ Feingold (D)	4R, 4D	Kerry/ Edwards (D) ✗
2007	Jim Doyle (D)	Barbara Lawton (D)	Doug La Follette (D)	J. B. Van Hollen (R)	Dawn Marie Sass (D)	Elizabeth Burmaster (NP/D)	18D, 15R	52R, 47D	Herb Kohl (D)	Russ Feingold (D)	5D, 3R	Kerry/ Edwards (D) ✗
2008	Jim Doyle (D)	Barbara Lawton (D)	Doug La Follette (D)	J. B. Van Hollen (R)	Dawn Marie Sass (D)	Elizabeth Burmaster (NP/D)	18D, 15R	52R, 47D	Herb Kohl (D)	Russ Feingold (D)	5D, 3R	Obama/ Biden (D) ✓
2009	Jim Doyle (D)	Barbara Lawton (D)	Doug La Follette (D)	J. B. Van Hollen (R)	Dawn Marie Sass (D)	Tony Evers (NP/D)	18D, 15R	52D, 46R, 1I	Herb Kohl (D)	Russ Feingold (D)	5D, 3R	Obama/ Biden (D) ✓
2010	Jim Doyle (D)	Barbara Lawton (D)	Doug La Follette (D)	J. B. Van Hollen (R)	Dawn Marie Sass (D)	Tony Evers (NP/D)	18D, 15R	52D, 46R, 1I	Herb Kohl (D)	Russ Feingold (D)	5D, 3R	Obama/ Biden (D) ✓
2011	Scott Walker (R)	Rebecca Kleefisch (R)	Doug La Follette (D)	J. B. Van Hollen (R)	Kurt W. Schuller (R)	Tony Evers (NP/D)	19R, 14D	59R, 39D, 1I	Herb Kohl (D)	Ron Johnson (R)	5R, 3D	Obama/ Biden (D) ✓
2011	Scott Walker (R)	Rebecca Kleefisch (R)	Doug La Follette (D)	J. B. Van Hollen (R)	Kurt W. Schuller (R)	Tony Evers (NP/D)	17R, 16D (Note: See 2011 Wisconsin Senate recall elections.)	59R, 39D, 1I	Herb Kohl (D)	Ron Johnson (R)	5R, 3D	Obama/ Biden (D) ✓
2012	Scott Walker (R)	Rebecca Kleefisch (R)	Doug La Follette (D)	J. B. Van Hollen (R)	Kurt W. Schuller (R)	Tony Evers (NP/D)	17D, 16R (Note: See 2012 Wisconsin Senate recall elections.)	59R, 39D, 1I	Herb Kohl (D)	Ron Johnson (R)	5R, 3D	Obama/ Biden (D) ✓
2013	Scott Walker (R)	Rebecca Kleefisch (R)	Doug La Follette (D)	J. B. Van Hollen (R)	Kurt W. Schuller (R)	Tony Evers (NP/D)	18R, 15D	60R, 39D	Tammy Baldwin (D)	Ron Johnson (R)	5R, 3D	Obama/ Biden (D) ✓
2014	Scott Walker (R)	Rebecca Kleefisch (R)	Doug La Follette (D)	J. B. Van Hollen (R)	Kurt W. Schuller (R)	Tony Evers (NP/D)	18R, 15D	60R, 39D	Tammy Baldwin (D)	Ron Johnson (R)	5R, 3D	Obama/ Biden (D) ✓
2015	Scott Walker (R)	Rebecca Kleefisch (R)	Doug La Follette (D)	Brad Schimel (R)	Matt Adamczyk (R)	Tony Evers (NP/D)	19R, 14D	63R, 36D	Tammy Baldwin (D)	Ron Johnson (R)	5R, 3D	Obama/ Biden (D) ✓
2016	Scott Walker (R)	Rebecca Kleefisch (R)	Doug La Follette (D)	Brad Schimel (R)	Matt Adamczyk (R)	Tony Evers (NP/D)	19R, 14D	63R, 36D	Tammy Baldwin (D)	Ron Johnson (R)	5R, 3D	Trump/ Pence (R) ✓
2017	Scott Walker (R)	Rebecca Kleefisch (R)	Doug La Follette (D)	Brad Schimel (R)	Matt Adamczyk (R)	Tony Evers (NP/D)	20R, 13D	64R, 35D	Tammy Baldwin (D)	Ron Johnson (R)	5R, 3D	Trump/ Pence (R) ✓
2018	Scott Walker (R)	Rebecca Kleefisch (R)	Doug La Follette (D)	Brad Schimel (R)	Matt Adamczyk (R)	Tony Evers (NP/D)	18R, 15D	64R, 35D	Tammy Baldwin (D)	Ron Johnson (R)	5R, 3D	Trump/ Pence (R) ✓
2019	Tony Evers (D)	Mandela Barnes (D)	Doug La Follette (D)	Josh Kaul (D)	Sarah Godlewski (D)	Carolyn Stanford; Taylor (NP/D)	19R, 14D	63R, 36D	Tammy Baldwin (D)	Ron Johnson (R)	5R, 3D	Trump/ Pence (R) ✓
2020	Tony Evers (D)	Mandela Barnes (D)	Doug La Follette (D)	Josh Kaul (D)	Sarah Godlewski (D)	Carolyn Stanford; Taylor (NP/D)	19R, 14D	63R, 36D	Tammy Baldwin (D)	Ron Johnson (R)	5R, 3D	Biden/ Harris (D) ✓
2021	Tony Evers (D)	Mandela Barnes (D)	Doug La Follette (D)	Josh Kaul (D)	Sarah Godlewski (D)	Jill Underly (NP/D)	21R, 12D	61R, 38D	Tammy Baldwin (D)	Ron Johnson (R)	5R, 3D	Biden/ Harris (D) ✓
2022	Tony Evers (D)	Mandela Barnes (D)	Doug La Follette (D)	Josh Kaul (D)	Sarah Godlewski (D)	Jill Underly (NP/D)	21R, 12D	61R, 38D	Tammy Baldwin (D)	Ron Johnson (R)	5R, 3D	Biden/ Harris (D) ✓
2023	Tony Evers (D)	Sara Rodriguez (D)	Sarah Godlewski (D)	Josh Kaul (D)	John Leiber (R)	Jill Underly (NP/D)	22R, 11D	64R, 35D	Tammy Baldwin (D)	Ron Johnson (R)	6R, 2D	Biden/ Harris (D) ✓
2024	Tony Evers (D)	Sara Rodriguez (D)	Sarah Godlewski (D)	Josh Kaul (D)	John Leiber (R)	Jill Underly (NP/D)	22R, 11D	64R, 35D	Tammy Baldwin (D)	Ron Johnson (R)	6R, 2D	Trump/ Vance (R) ✓
2025	Tony Evers (D)	Sara Rodriguez (D)	Sarah Godlewski (D)	Josh Kaul (D)	John Leiber (R)	Jill Underly (NP/D)	18R, 15D	54R, 45D	Tammy Baldwin (D)	Ron Johnson (R)	6R, 2D	Trump/ Vance (R) ✓
2026	Tony Evers (D)	Sara Rodriguez (D)	Sarah Godlewski (D)	Josh Kaul (D)	John Leiber (R)	Jill Underly (NP/D)	18R, 15D	54R, 45D	Tammy Baldwin (D)	Ron Johnson (R)	6R, 2D	Trump/ Vance (R) ✓
2027	David Crowley (D)	Sarah Godlewski (D)	JoCasta Zamarripa (D)	Josh Kaul (D)	Yee Leng Xiong (D)	Jill Underly (NP/D)	18D, 15R	53D, 46R	Tammy Baldwin (D)	Ron Johnson (R)	4R, 4D	Trump/ Vance (R) ✓

Key to party colors and abbreviations for members of the U.S. Congress and other politicians or officials
Alaskan Independence (AKIP) Know Nothing (KN) American Labor (AL) Anti-Jacksonian (Anti-J); National Republican (NR) Anti-Administration (AA) Anti-Masonic (Anti-M) Conservative (Con) Covenant (Cov)	Democratic (D) Democratic–Farmer–Labor (DFL) Democratic–NPL (D-NPL) Dixiecrat (Dix), States' Rights (SR) Democratic-Republican (DR) Farmer–Labor (FL) Federalist (F); Pro-Administration (PA)	Free Soil (FS) Fusion (Fus) Greenback (GB) Independence (IPM) Jacksonian (J) Liberal (Lib) Libertarian (L) National Union (NU)	Nonpartisan League (NPL) Nullifier (N) Opposition Northern (O); Opposition Southern (O) Populist (Pop) Progressive (Prog) Prohibition (Proh) Readjuster (Rea)	Republican (R) Silver (Sv) Silver Republican (SvR) Socialist (Soc) Union (U) Unconditional Union (UU) Vermont Progressive (VP) Whig (W)	Independent (I) Nonpartisan (NP)

== See also ==
- List of superintendents of public instruction of Wisconsin
- Politics in Wisconsin
- Elections in Wisconsin
