= List of superintendents of public instruction of Wisconsin =

Number of superintendents of public instruction of Wisconsin by party affiliation
Party	Superintendents
None	9
Republican	6
Democratic	5
Unknown Party	3
Liberal Republican	1
National Union	1
Independent	1

This is a list of people who have held the position of Superintendent of Public Instruction of Wisconsin. Partisan affiliation is indicated by shading for superintendents elected prior to 1902, when partisan elections for this office were ended. Since 1902, state superintendents have been elected on a nonpartisan basis with no affiliation on the ballot; thus, a state superintendent is not allowed to affiliate with a political party during his or her time in office. However, an individual elected or appointed to the office of state superintendent may be a member of a political party before and after their time in office. For example, Herbert J. Grover and Charles P. Cary both held prior partisan legislative or county office whereas Tony Evers ran for and won a partisan governor's race.

#	Superintendent	Party	Entered office	Left office	Notes
1	Eleazer Root	Independent	January 1, 1849	January 5, 1852	
2	Azel P. Ladd	Democratic	January 5, 1852	January 2, 1854	
3	Hiram A. Wright	Democratic	January 2, 1854	May 29, 1855	Died in office.
--Vacant--			May 29, 1855	June 26, 1855	
4	Alfred Constantine Barry	Democratic	June 26, 1855	January 4, 1858	Appointed by Governor William A. Barstow.
5	Lyman Draper	Democratic (Note: Draper also appeared on the Reform Democratic ticket.)	January 4, 1858	January 2, 1860	
6	Josiah Little Pickard	Republican	January 2, 1860	September 30, 1864	Resigned.
--Vacant--			September 30, 1864	October 1, 1864	
7	John G. McMynn	National Union	October 1, 1864	January 6, 1868	Appointed by Governor James T. Lewis, then elected in 1864 & 1865.
8	Alexander J. Craig	Republican	January 6, 1868	July 6, 1870	Died in office.
9	Samuel Fallows	?	July 6, 1870	January 4, 1874	Appointed by Governor Lucius Fairchild, then elected in 1871.
10	Edward Searing	Liberal Republican	January 4, 1874	January 7, 1878	
11	William Clarke Whitford	Republican	January 7, 1878	January 2, 1882	
12	Robert Graham	Republican	January 2, 1882	January 3, 1887	
13	Jesse B. Thayer	Republican	January 3, 1887	January 5, 1891	
14	Oliver Elwin Wells	Democratic	January 5, 1891	January 7, 1895	
15	John Q. Emery	Republican	January 7, 1895	January 2, 1899	
16	Lorenzo D. Harvey	Republican	January 2, 1899	January 5, 1903	
17	Charles P. Cary	None (Note: Previously a Republican county superintendent of schools.)	January 5, 1903	July 1, 1921	
18	John Callahan	None	July 1, 1921	July 1, 1949	
19	George Earl Watson	None	July 1, 1949 (Note: Technically Watson delayed beginning his first term for about a week due to an issue with pending legislation, but he was appointed by the governor to take office in an acting capacity on the regular schedule.)	July 1, 1961	
20	Angus B. Rothwell	None	July 1, 1961	July 1, 1966	Resigned.
21	William C. Kahl	None	July 1, 1966	July 2, 1973	Appointed by Governor Warren P. Knowles, then elected in 1969.
22	Barbara Thompson	None	July 2, 1973	July 6, 1981	
23	Herbert J. Grover	None (Note: Previously a Democratic state legislator)	July 6, 1981	April 9, 1993	Resigned.
-	Lee S. Dreyfus	Republican	April 9, 1993	July 7, 1993	Appointed by Governor Tommy Thompson to oversee the Department of Public Instruction.
24	John T. Benson	None	July 7, 1993	July 2, 2001	
25	Elizabeth Burmaster	None	July 2, 2001	July 6, 2009	
26	Tony Evers	None (Note: He subsequently was elected governor running as a Democrat.)	July 6, 2009	January 7, 2019	Resigned after election as governor of Wisconsin.
27	Carolyn Stanford Taylor	None	January 7, 2019	July 5, 2021	Appointed by Governor Tony Evers.
28	Jill Underly	None	July 5, 2021	--Current--	
