= Marshall, Ohio =

Unincorporated community in Ohio, U.S.

Coordinates: 39°09′07″N 83°29′06″W

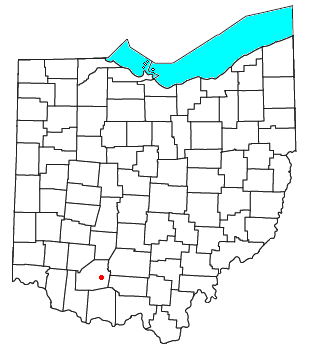
Location of Marshall, Ohio

Marshall is an unincorporated community in central Marshall Township, Highland County, Ohio, United States. It lies at the intersection of State Routes 124 and 506. Rocky Fork Lake, the site of Rocky Fork State Park, is located 2 miles (3 km) to the north. It lies 7 miles (11 km) east-southeast of the city of Hillsboro, the county seat of Highland County. An early variant name was West Liberty.

The Marshall High School Red Flashes were the Class B State Basketball Champions in 1928. As a result, the gymnasium at the former high/elementary school was constructed in 1931.

== Gallery ==
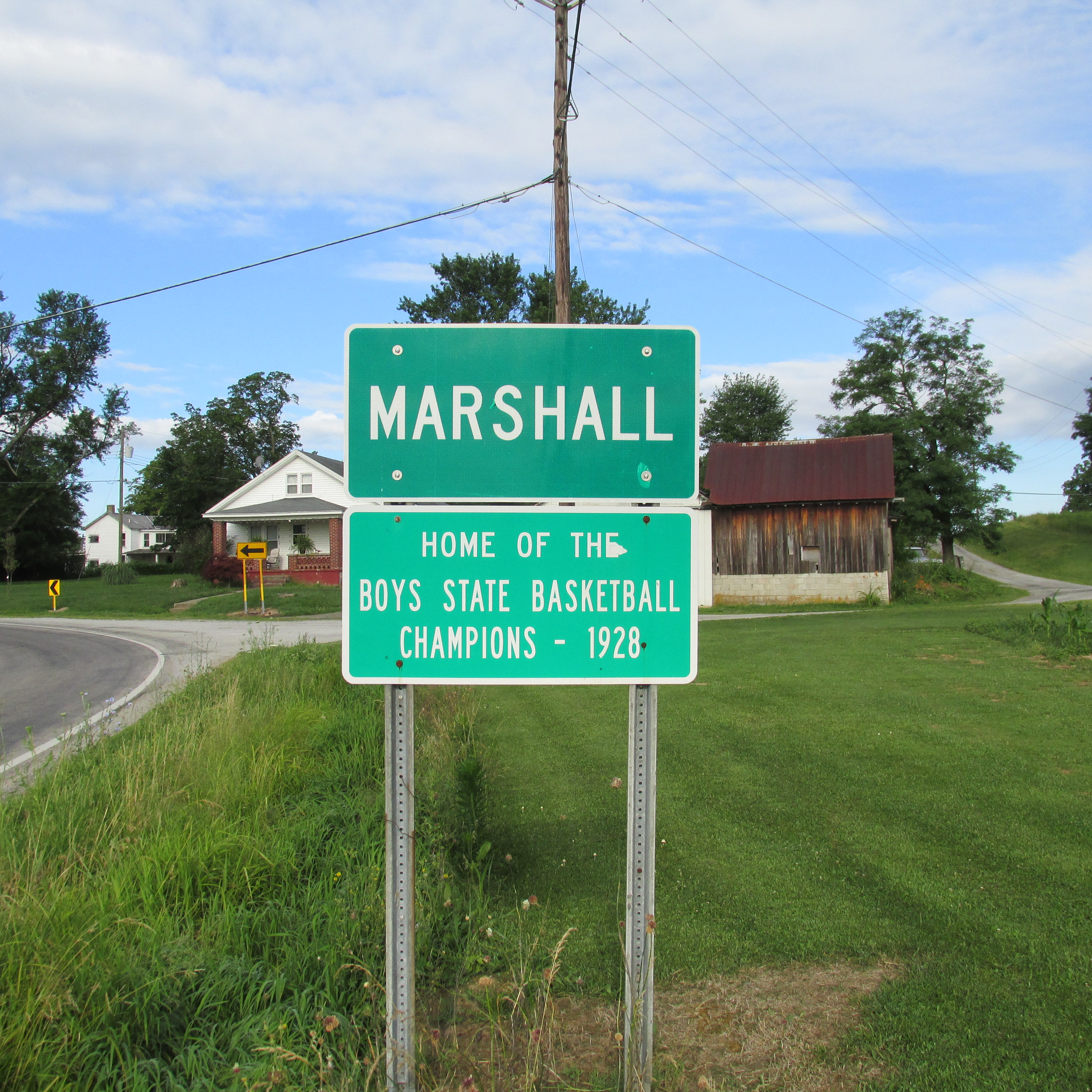
Marshall community sign

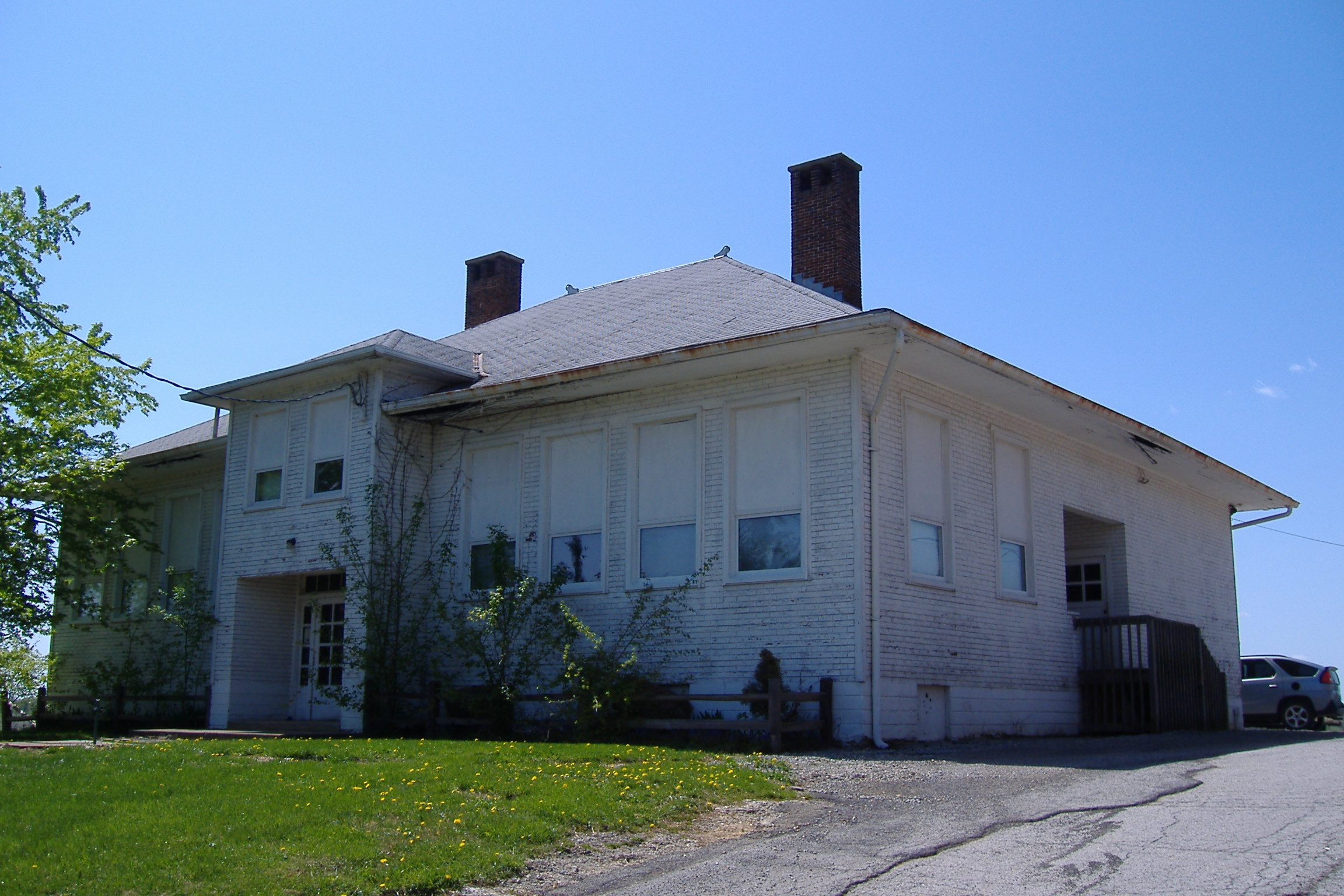
Marshall Community Center, formally Marshall High School and Elementary School, built 1919, demolished December 28, 2011

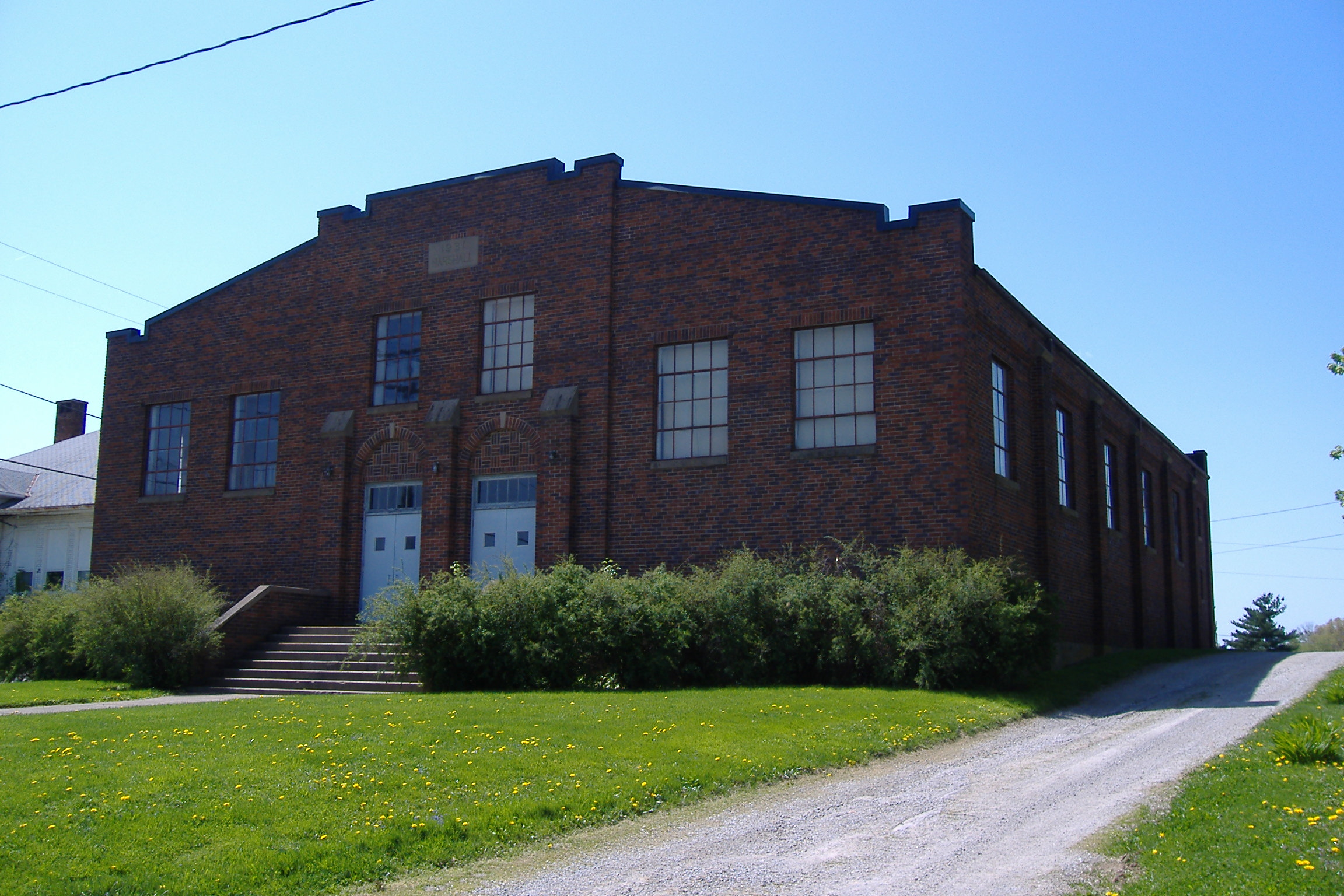
Marshall Community Center, formally Marshall High School and Elementary School, Built 1931

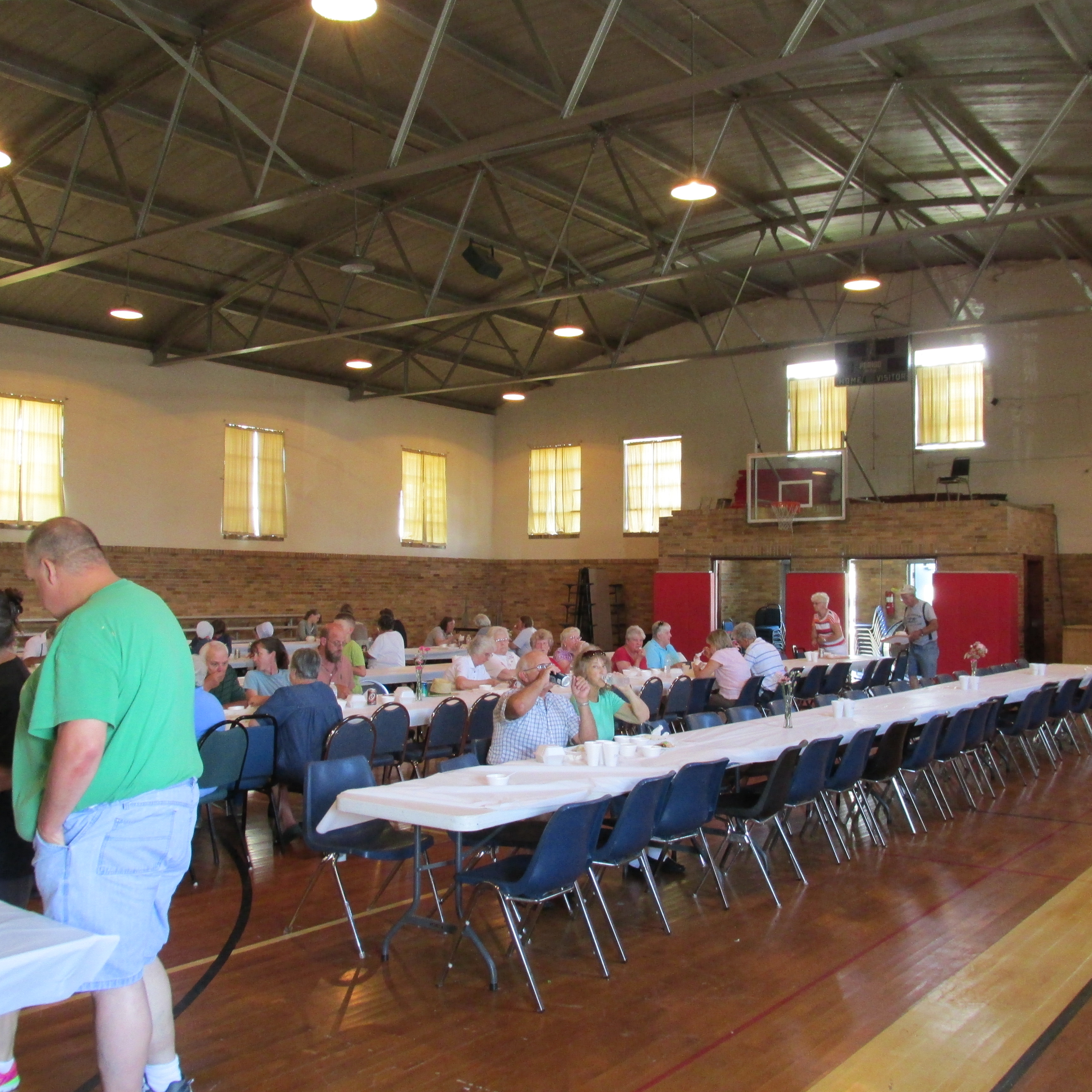
Interior of Marshall Community Center

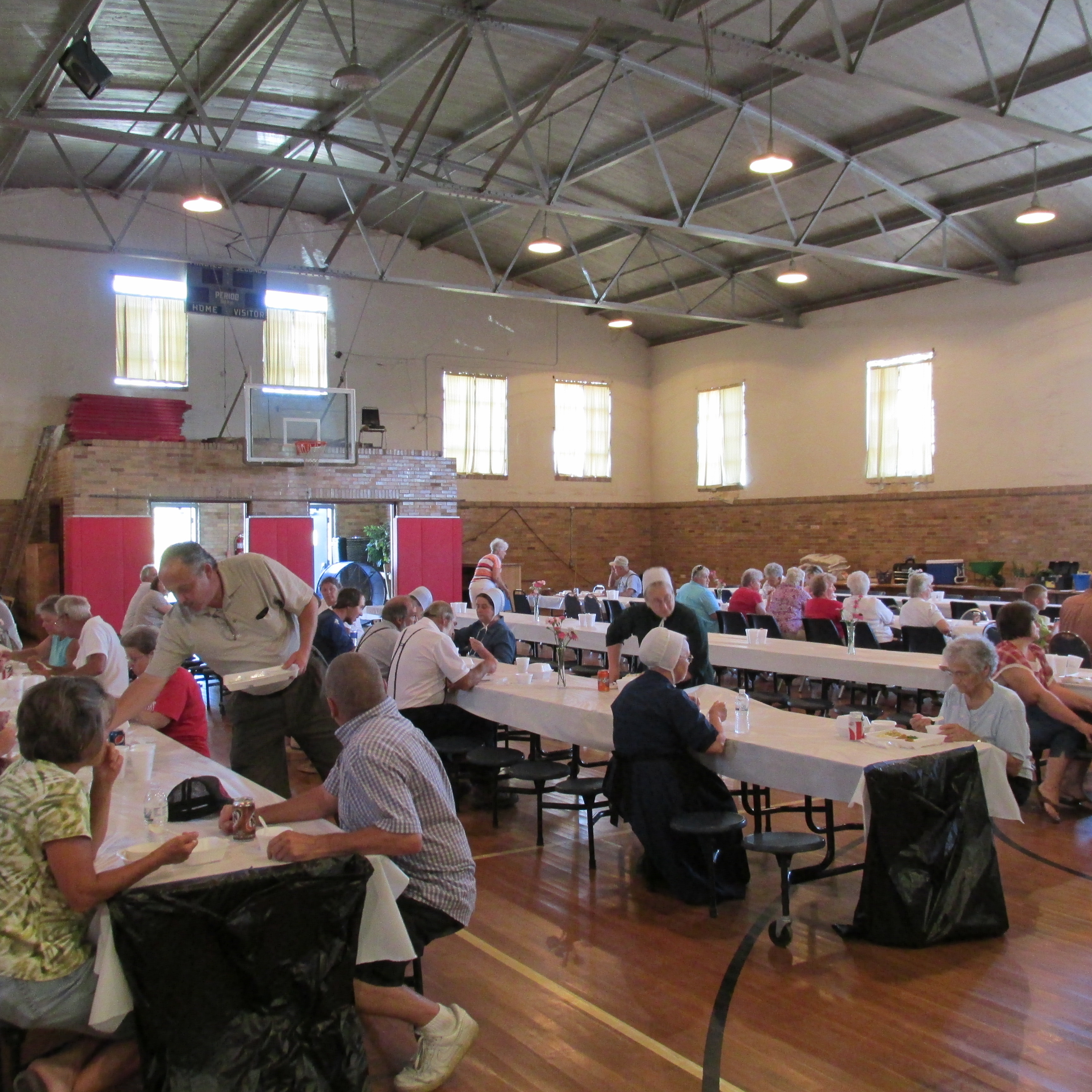
Interior of Marshall Community Center

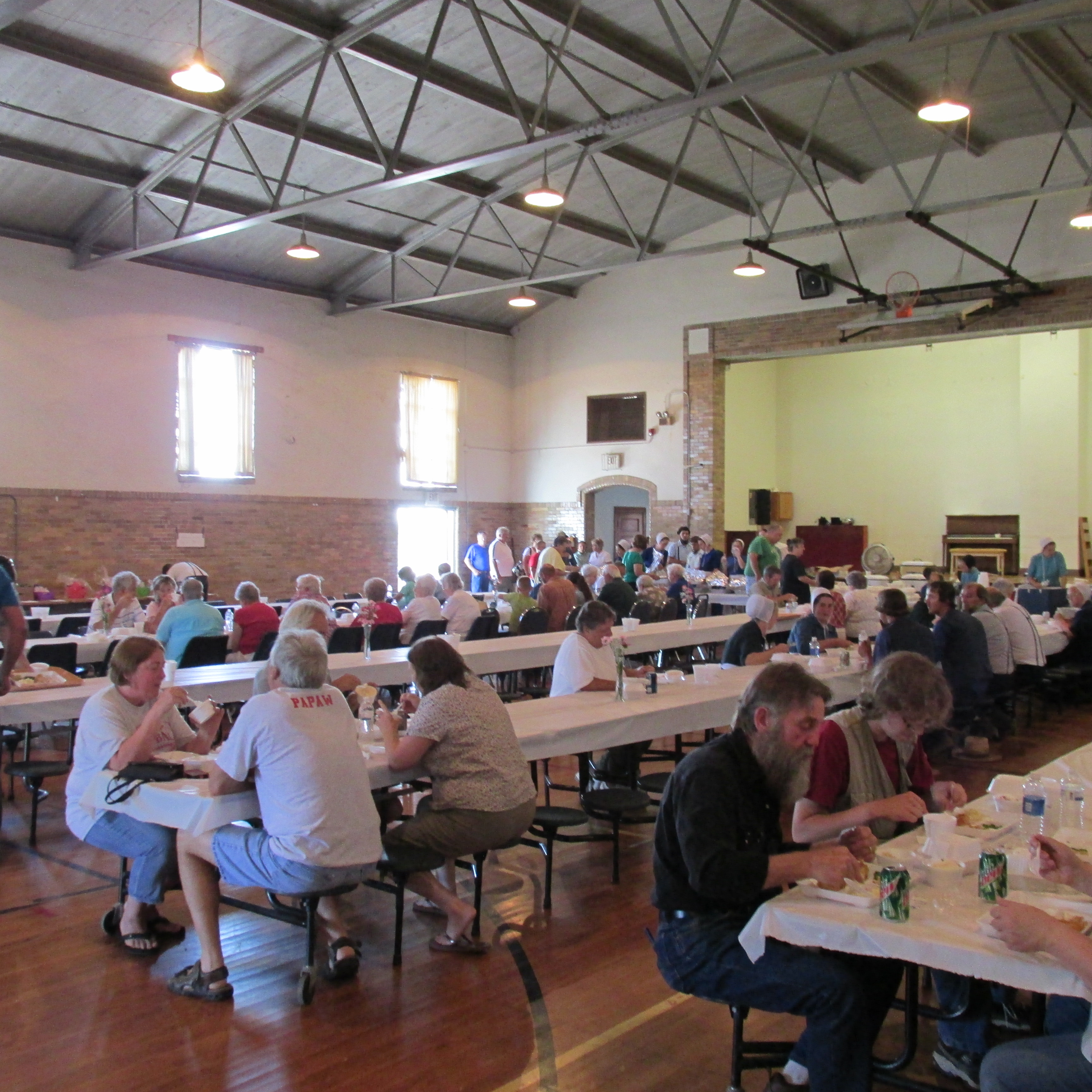
Interior of Marshall Community Center

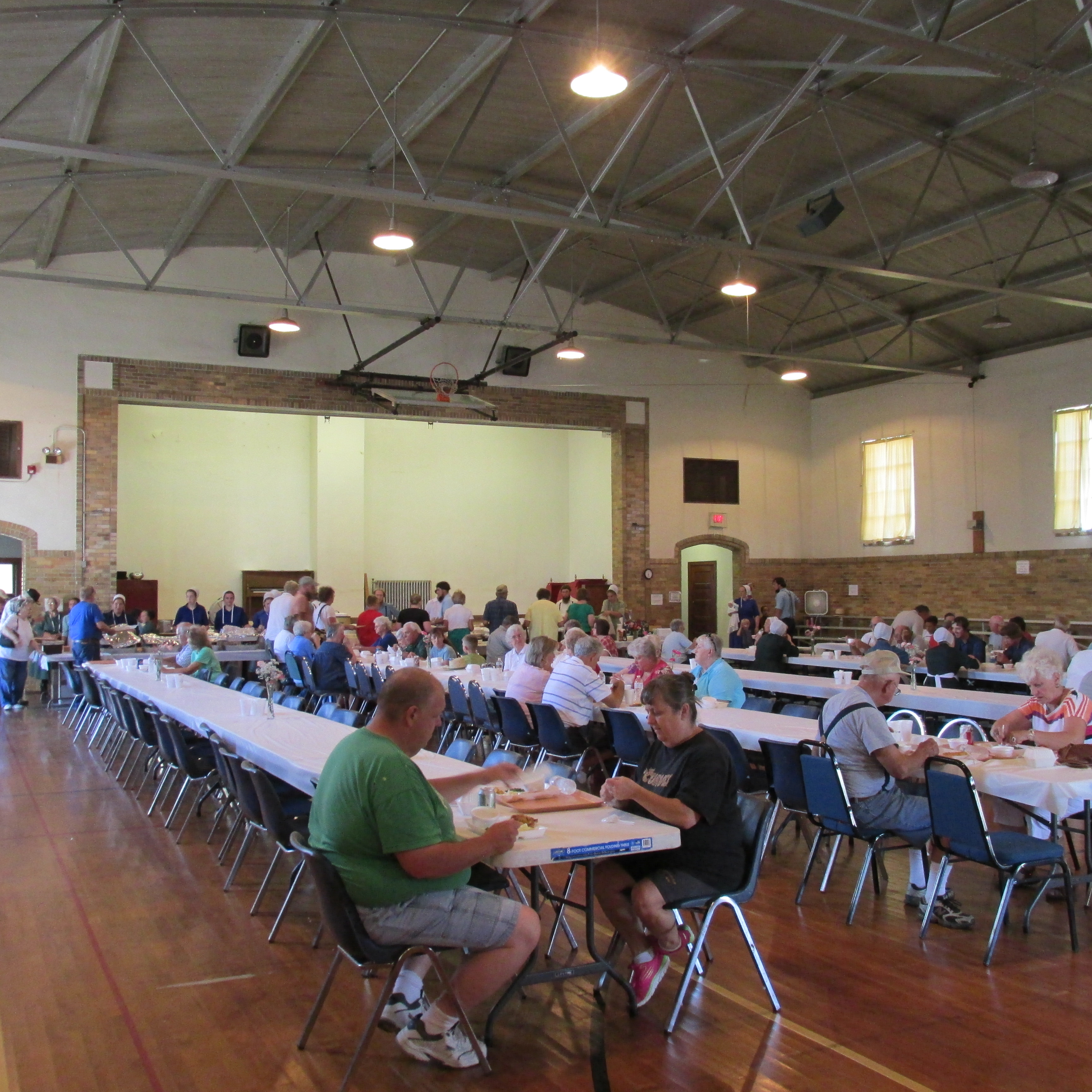
Interior of Marshall Community Center

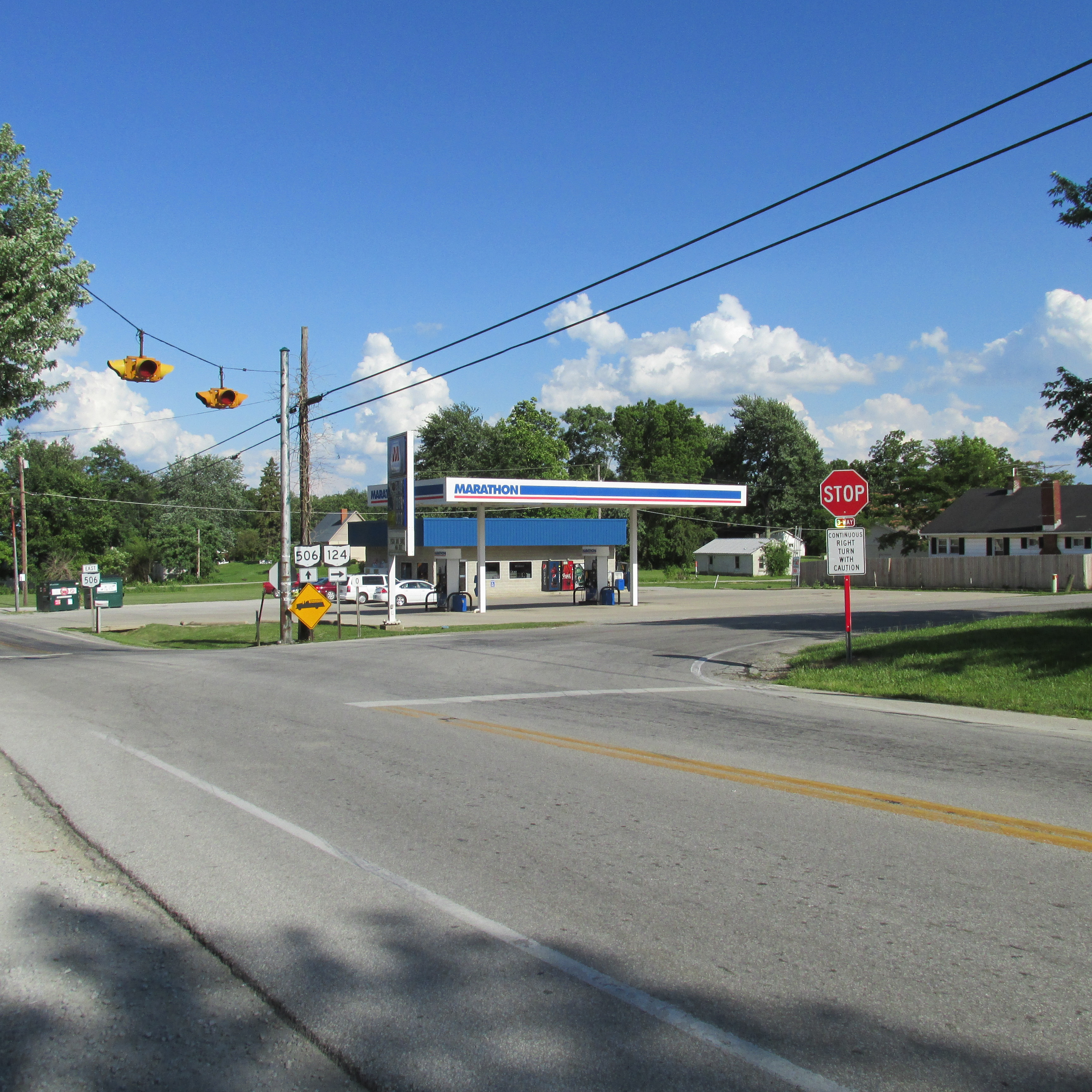
Intersection of State Routes 506 and 124 in Marshall

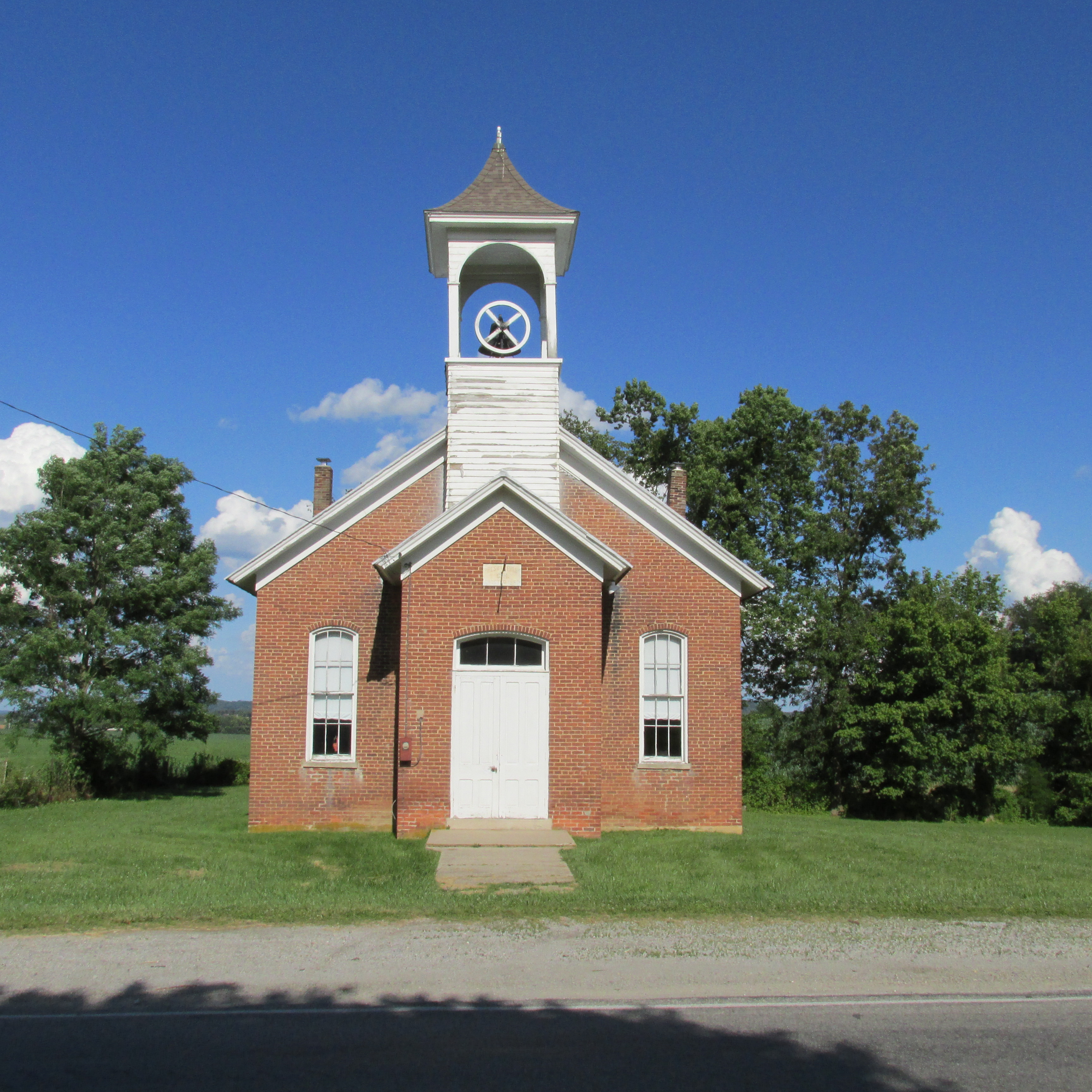
Marshall Presbyterian Church, constructed 1880

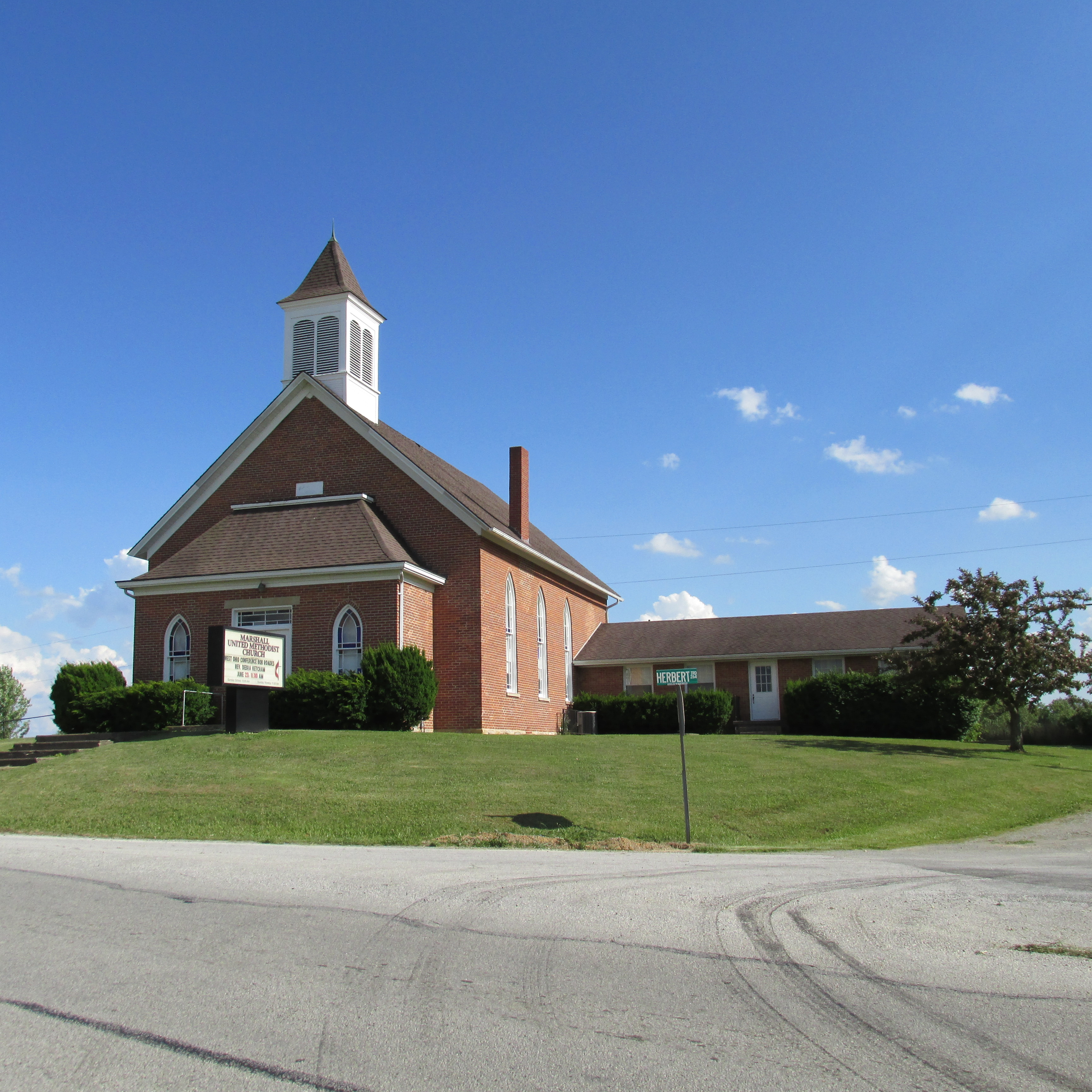
Marshall United Methodist Church, constructed 1879 with addition added in 1965

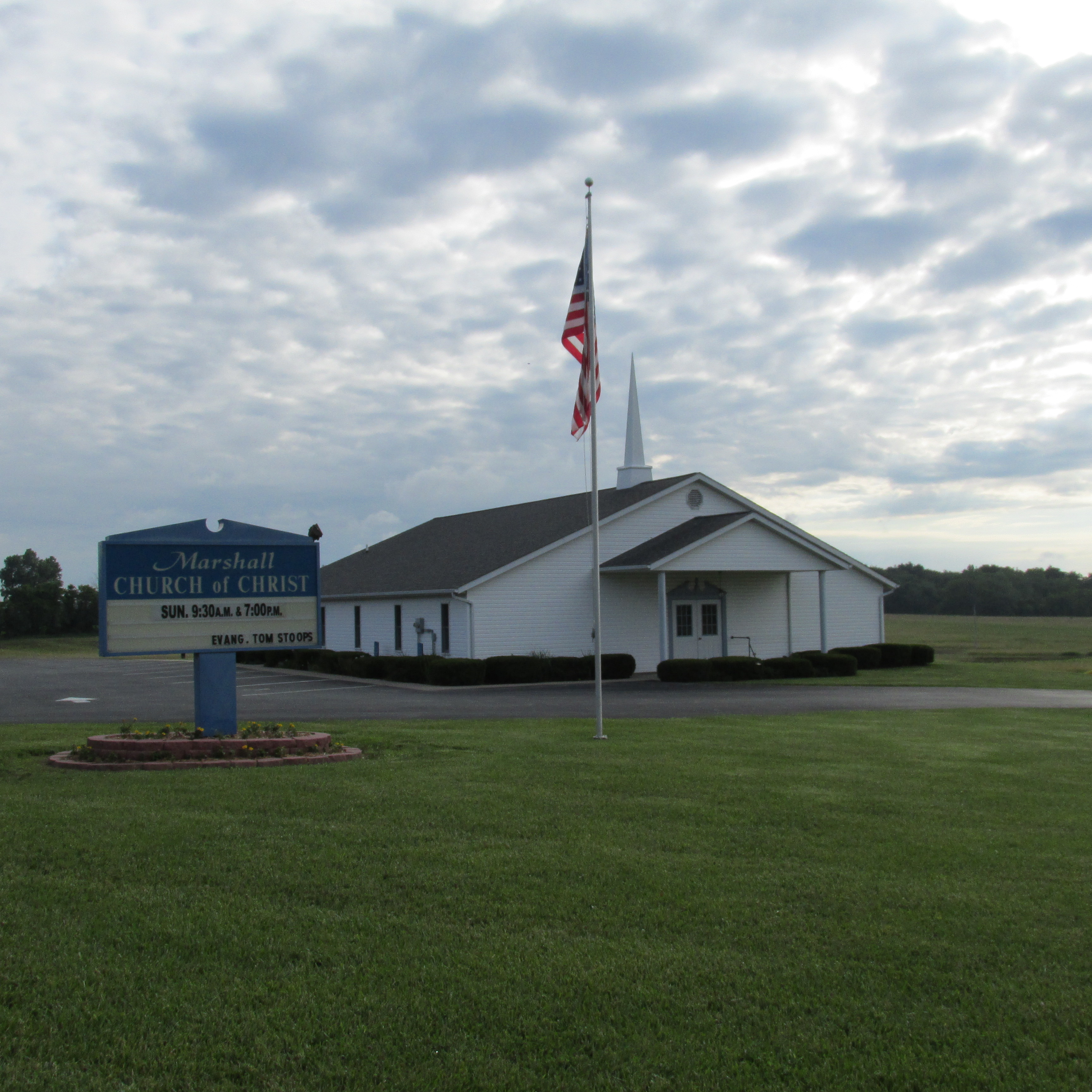
Marshall Church Of Christ

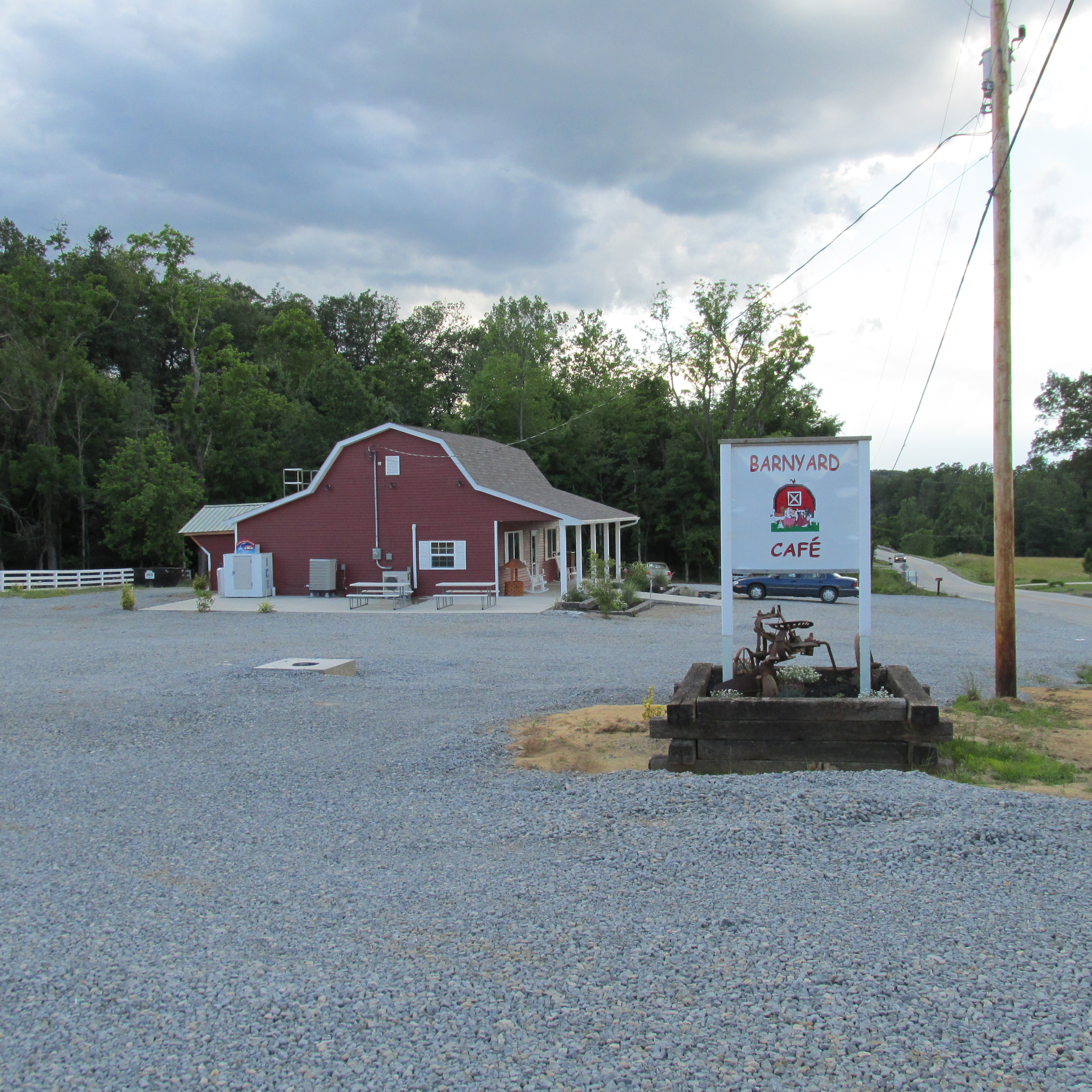
Barnyard Cafe

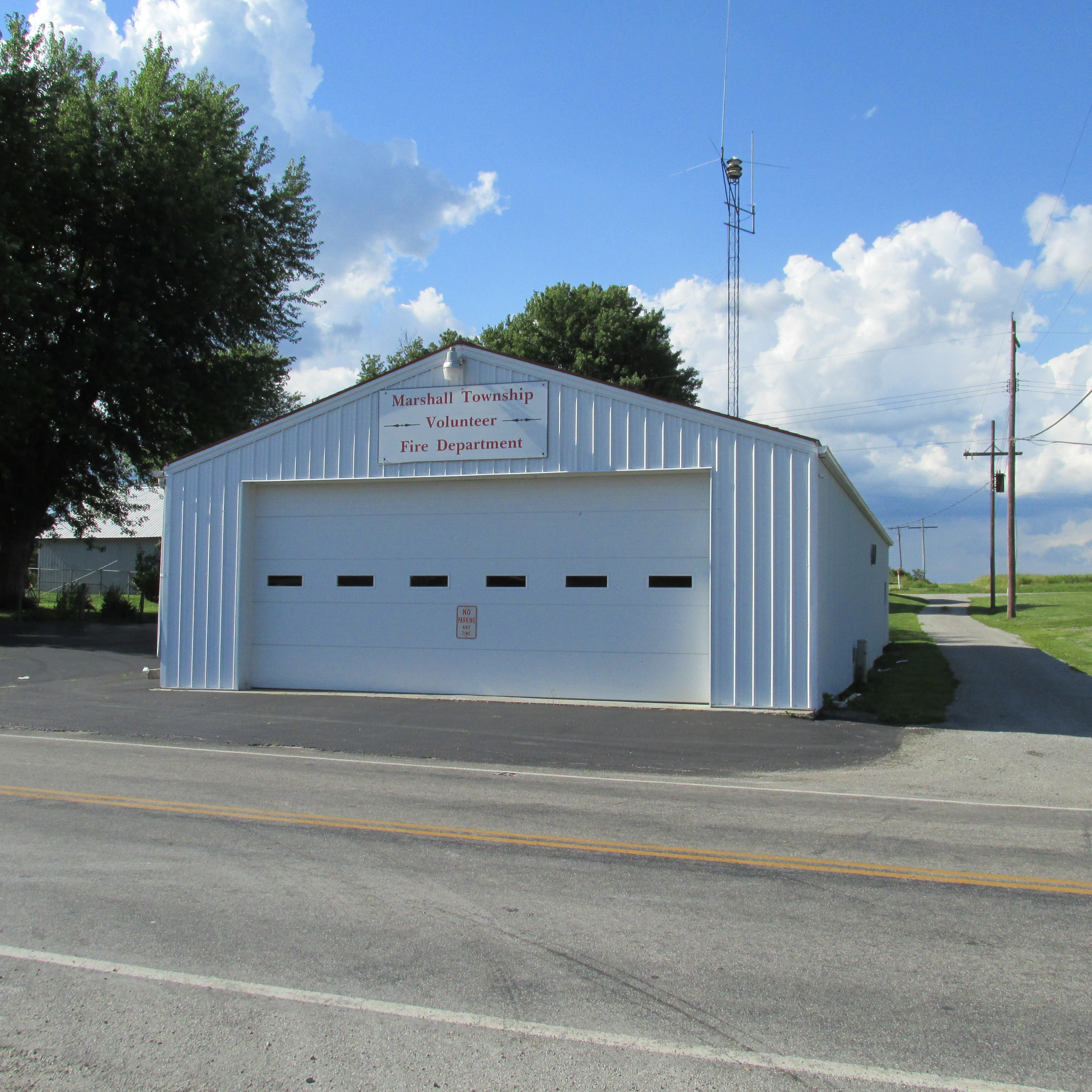
Marshall Township Volunteer Fire Department

== Notable person ==
- Charles P. Cary, Wisconsin Superintendent of Public Instruction
