= Lorenzo D. Harvey =

American educator (1848–1922)

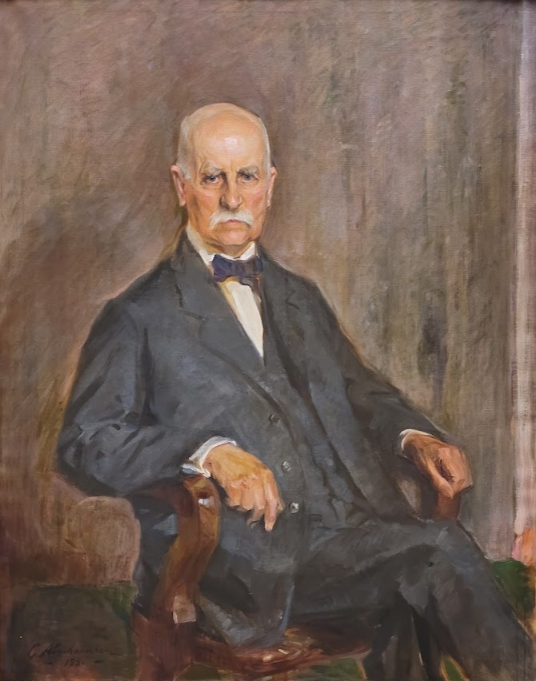

16th Superintendent of Public Instruction of Wisconsin
- In office January 2, 1899 – January 5, 1903
- Preceded by: John Q. Emery
- Succeeded by: Charles P. Cary

Personal details
- Born: November 23, 1848 Deerfield, New Hampshire, U.S.
- Died: June 1, 1922 (aged 73) Menomonie, Wisconsin, U.S.
- Resting place: Riverside Cemetery, Oshkosh, Wisconsin
- Party: Republican
- Spouse: Florence Allettie Brown (m. 1874–1922)
- Children: Leeta Alice (Jackson) (b. 1876; died 1905); Helen (Williams) (b. 1878; died 1922); Hazel Harvey (b. 1881; died 1888); Gladys Harvey (b. 1886; died 1962)
- Education: Milton College
- Profession: Educator, Politician

Lorenzo Dow Harvey (November 23, 1848 – June 1, 1922) was an American educator and Republican politician from Wisconsin. He was the 16th Superintendent of Public Instruction of Wisconsin, serving from 1899 to 1903. For the last 14 years of his life, he was president of the Stout Institute at Menomonie, Wisconsin (now University of Wisconsin–Stout).

== Early life and career ==
Harvey was born in Deerfield, New Hampshire, and moved with his parents to Wisconsin in 1850, settling in Fulton, Wisconsin. Harvey earned his bachelor's degree from Milton College in 1872, and earned his master's degree from Milton in 1876.

Harvey served as principal of Mazomanie High School in Mazomanie, Wisconsin from 1873 to 1875, and from 1875 to 1880 he served as principal of Sheboygan High School in Sheboygan, Wisconsin. In 1880, Harvey was admitted to the bar.

He moved to Oshkosh, Wisconsin in 1885 to serve as conductor of institutes and professor of political economy at the Oshkosh Normal School. Harvey served as president of the Wisconsin State Normal School in Milwaukee, Wisconsin from 1892 to 1898. He was president of the Wisconsin Teachers' Association from 1890 to 1891.

== Political career ==
Harvey was elected State Superintendent of Public Instruction in 1898 and served two terms, from 1899 to 1903. He was defeated for renomination in 1902, and moved to Menomonie, Wisconsin, where he served as superintendent of the public school system from 1903 to 1908. In 1908 he was named president of the Stout Institute at Menomonie, which would later become the University of Wisconsin–Stout. Harvey served as president until his death in 1922. He was a member of the National Education Association, and served as vice president from 1908 to 1909 and president from 1909 to 1910.

== See also ==
- List of superintendents of public instruction of Wisconsin

Party political offices
Preceded by Jesse B. Thayer	Republican nominee for Superintendent of Public Instruction of Wisconsin; 1890	Succeeded by Willard H. Chandler
Preceded by John Q. Emery	Republican nominee for Superintendent of Public Instruction of Wisconsin; 1898, 1900	Office became nonpartisan
Political offices
Preceded by John Q. Emery	Superintendent of Public Instruction of Wisconsin; January 2, 1899 – January 5, 1903	Charles P. Cary
