= George Earl Watson =

American educator (1897–1975)

19th Superintendent of Public Instruction of Wisconsin
- In office July 1, 1949 – July 1, 1961
- Preceded by: John Callahan
- Succeeded by: Angus B. Rothwell

Personal details
- Born: October 16, 1897 Neenah, Wisconsin, U.S.
- Died: April 17, 1975 (aged 77) Sun City, Arizona, U.S.
- Education: Lawrence University; University of Wisconsin–Madison
- Occupation: Educator

George Earl Watson (October 16, 1897 – April 17, 1975) was an American educator.

Born in Neenah, Wisconsin, Watson received his bachelor's degree from Lawrence University and his masters from University of Wisconsin–Madison. He then became a teacher and served as principal and school supervisor. He served as Wisconsin Superintendent of Public Instruction from 1949 to 1961. Watson died of April 17, 1975 in Sun City, Arizona.
