= William C. Kahl =

American politician and educator (1908–2001)

21st Superintendent of Public Instruction of Wisconsin
- In office July 1, 1966 – July 2, 1973
- Preceded by: Angus B. Rothwell
- Succeeded by: Barbara Thompson

Personal details
- Born: September 21, 1908 Mount Horeb, Wisconsin, U.S.
- Died: February 7, 2001 (aged 92)
- Education: University of Wisconsin–Madison
- Occupation: Educator

William C. Kahl (September 21, 1908 – February 7, 2001) was an American educator.

Kahl was born September 21, 1908, at Mount Horeb, Wisconsin. Kahl graduated from the University of Wisconsin–Madison. He then was a teacher and principal at various schools. In 1966, Kahl was appointed Wisconsin Superintendent of Public Instruction. Kahl was then elected to the office, serving until 1973.

He died February 7, 2001.
