= Angus B. Rothwell =

American politician

20th Superintendent of Public Instruction of Wisconsin
- In office July 1, 1961 – July 1, 1966
- Preceded by: George Earl Watson
- Succeeded by: William C. Kahl

Personal details
- Born: July 25, 1905 Superior, Wisconsin, U.S.
- Died: August 11, 1981 (aged 76)
- Education: University of Wisconsin–Superior; Columbia University
- Occupation: Educator

Military service
- Allegiance: United States
- Branch/service: United States Navy
- Battles/wars: World War II

Angus B. Rothwell (July 25, 1905 – August 11, 1981) was Superintendent of Public Instruction of Wisconsin.

== Biography ==
Rothwell was born on July 25, 1905, in Superior, Wisconsin. He graduated from the University of Wisconsin–Superior and Columbia University. Additionally, he received honorary degrees from Carroll University and Lawrence University. During World War II, he served in the United States Navy. He also served as President of Rotary International. Rothwell died on August 11, 1981.

== Educational career ==
Rothwell was an elementary school principal in Wausau, Wisconsin, and a high school principal in Superior. He later served as Superintendent of Schools of Superior from 1941 to 1949 and of Manitowoc, Wisconsin, from 1949 to 1961. Rothwell was elected Superintendent of Public Instruction in 1961 and re-elected in 1965. He was also a member of the Board of Regents of the University of Wisconsin–Madison.
