= Azel P. Ladd =

American politician

2nd Superintendent of Public Instruction of Wisconsin
- In office 1852–1854
- Preceded by: Eleazer Root
- Succeeded by: Hiram A. Wright

Personal details
- Born: c. 1811 Haverhill, New Hampshire
- Died: July 27, 1854
- Party: Democratic

Dr. Azel Parkhurst Ladd (c. 1811– July 27, 1854) was an American educator, medical doctor and politician from Wisconsin.

Born in Haverhill, New Hampshire, Ladd studied medicine at Harvard University and taught school in Massachusetts. In 1842, he moved to Shullsburg, Wisconsin where he was involved with mining. In 1851, Ladd called for "temporary normal schools" to provide for more teachers. He was elected as the second Superintendent of Public Instruction of Wisconsin, serving from 1852 to 1854 with a salary of $1,000 per year. Through regional meetings he organized the Wisconsin Teachers' Association and called the first state teachers' convention in 1853. He was also involved with the Wisconsin Historical Society. Ladd was an advocate for the Common School Fund.

Following his term in office, Ladd briefly resumed his medical practice. Ladd died from cholera at the age of 42 in 1854, six months after leaving office.
