= John Callahan (Wisconsin politician) =

American educator (1865–1956)

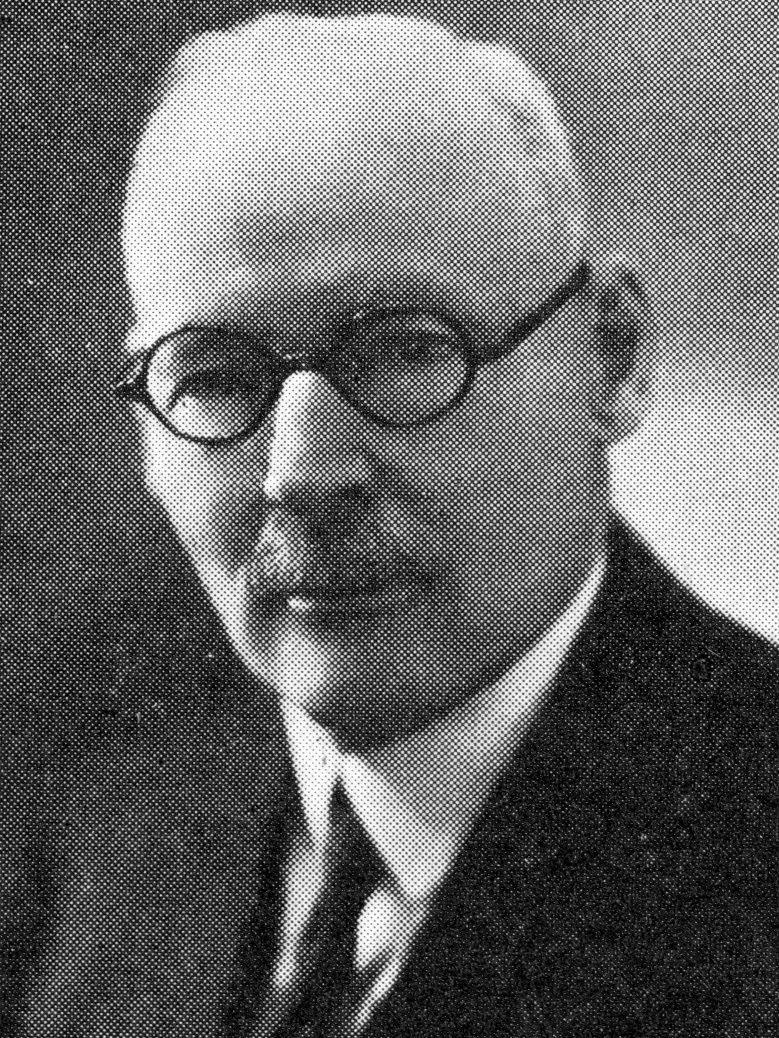
- Callahan c. 1929

18th Superintendent of Public Instruction of Wisconsin
- In office July 1, 1921 – July 1, 1949
- Preceded by: Charles P. Cary
- Succeeded by: George Earl Watson

Personal details
- Born: December 16, 1865 Goldens Bridge, New York, U.S.
- Died: May 10, 1956 (aged 90) Madison, Wisconsin, U.S.
- Resting place: Clayfield Catholic Cemetery, Ellsworth, Wisconsin
- Spouse: Mary Margaret Powers (m. 1889; died 1939)
- Children: Gertrude L. Callahan^{(b. 1891; died 1990)}; Alice M. (Roswell)^{(b. 1898; died 1978)}; Julia Tormey Callahan^{(b. 1903; died 1993)}
- Occupation: Educator

John Callahan (December 16, 1865 – May 10, 1956) was an American educator and school system administrator from Pierce County, Wisconsin. He was Wisconsin's 18th superintendent of public instruction; he is the longest-serving state superintendent in Wisconsin history, serving 28 years, from 1921 to 1949. Before becoming state superintendent, Callahan was one of the early leaders of the Wisconsin Technical College System, he also served as superintendent of public schools in Menasha, Wisconsin.

As state superintendent, he is best remembered for his push to bring more vocational and home economics courses into the public primary schools, and for his efforts to consolidate Wisconsin's many small local and sub-local school districts into larger unified districts.

== Biography ==
John Callahan was born in Goldens Bridge, in Westchester County, New York, in December 1865. At age three, he moved with his parents to a farm near Prescott, Wisconsin, where he was raised and educated. He attended public schools and, at age 16 in 1882, he began teaching in a one-room schoolhouse in rural Pierce County, Wisconsin. Over the next several years, he taught at several rural schools around Pierce County, while carrying on private study and working as a bricklayer.

In 1889, he was hired as a school principal in Crookston, Minnesota, but remained there for only a year, returning to work as principal in Glenwood City, Wisconsin, not far from his family home in Pierce County. While at Glenwood, Callahan became active in the Northwestern Wisconsin Teachers' Association, and was a frequent speaker and facilitator at association gatherings. He ultimately remained in Glenwood for about eight years before accepting a similar job in nearby New Richmond, Wisconsin, in 1898.

A year after his move to New Richmond, the city was hit by a devastating tornado which killed 117 people and demolished much of the town; it was the ninth deadliest tornado in U.S. history. Callahan was elected to the five-man commission set up by the state government to manage all aspects of municipal recovery after the tornado, including the policing of the township, and the collection, management, and distribution of all aide and relief funds. The following year, Callahan was elected president of the Northwestern Wisconsin Teachers' Association.

In 1901, Callahan moved 250 miles east to Menasha, Wisconsin, where he was hired as principal of Menasha High School. Just two years later, Callahan would be promoted to superintendent of Menasha public schools; he would remain in Menasha for the next seventeen years, raising his own family there. As superintendent, Callahan began advocating for educational reforms that he would continue later as state superintendent, bringing vocational training into the Menasha primary schools and pushing to close small one-room schoolhouses and consolidating into larger school buildings. He was elected president of the Northeastern Wisconsin Teachers' Association in 1908, and then elected president of the statewide Wisconsin Teachers' Association in 1913.

During his years in Menasha, Callahan had also become active in education legislation, and served on the state teachers' legislative committee for more than a decade. In the fall of 1916, Callahan was appointed to a special committee of educators and school administrators to advocate for revising Wisconsin's laws relating to local education, which they alleged had become complicated and contradictory. In April 1918, Callahan was elected secretary and director of the state board of industrial education; he moved to Madison, Wisconsin, to take up the new role and would remain in Madison for the rest of his life.

== State superintendent ==
In the fall of 1920, news reports began appearing suggesting that friends were urging Callahan to run for state superintendent in 1921. Callahan made his campaign official early in 1921, challenging incumbent superintendent Charles P. Cary. Callahan alleged that Cary, who had held the office for 18 years, was a source of bureaucratic inertia holding back state educational reforms. He also said he would push for a constitutional amendment which would abolish the existing office of state superintendent and replace it with a state education department led by a secretary of education who would be appointed by a state board of education, consolidating all state education programs under a single entity. Callahan won the election, receiving 54% of the vote, but the constitutional amendment he ran on would never reach the voters.

After winning the 1921 election, Callahan would hold the office of superintendent for the next 28 years. He would go on to win re-election without opposition in 1925 and 1929. In 1933, he faced a rematch with Charles Cary, but won re-election decisively, receiving 61% of the vote. He faced another election challenge in 1937, this time from William C. Hansen, but won by a similar margin, receiving 58%. In 1941, Callahan faced two opponents, but still achieved an outright majority in the general election, receiving 53% of the vote. Callahan won his final four-year term in 1945, defeating Arthur Jorgensen with 59% of the vote.

Callahan announced in January 1949 that he would not run for an eighth term as superintendent, and would retire at the end of his term. He left office July 1, 1949.

== Personal life and family ==
John Callahan was the eldest son and second of eight children born to Michael Callahan and his wife Johanna (née Welsh). The Callahans were Irish Catholics and both parents were Irish American immigrants.

John Callahan married Mary "Minnie" Powers in 1889, at Clayfield Catholic Church in Ellsworth, Wisconsin. They had three daughters and were married for 40 years before Mary's death in 1939. John Callahan died at age 90, on May 10, 1956, at his home on the west side of Madison, Wisconsin. The Callahans are buried at Clayfield Catholic Cemetery in Ellsworth.

== Electoral history ==
Year	Election	Date	Elected				Defeated				Total	Plurality
1921	General	Apr. 5	John Callahan	Nonpartisan	207,521	53.86%	Charles P. Cary (inc)	Non.	177,582	46.09%	385,306	29,939
1925	General	Apr. 7	John Callahan (inc)	Nonpartisan	342,691	99.88%	--unopposed--				343,094	
1929	General	Apr. 2	John Callahan (inc)	Nonpartisan	397,720	99.95%	--unopposed--				397,911	
1933	General	Apr. 4	John Callahan (inc)	Nonpartisan	403,813	61.27%	Charles P. Cary	Non.	255,290	38.73%	659,123	148,523
1937	General	Apr. 6	John Callahan (inc)	Nonpartisan	378,168	58.22%	William C. Hansen	Non.	271,328	41.77%	649,524	106,840
1941	General	Apr. 1	John Callahan (inc)	Nonpartisan	290,165	53.03%	Howard J. Williams	Non.	133,595	24.41%	547,213	156,570
1941	General	Apr. 1	John Callahan (inc)	Nonpartisan	290,165	53.03%	Edgar G. Doudna	Non.	123,368	22.54%	547,213	156,570
1945	General	Apr. 3	John Callahan (inc)	Nonpartisan	214,145	59.68%	Arthur Jorgensen	Non.	144,664	40.32%	358,809	69,481

Political offices
Preceded by Charles P. Cary	Superintendent of Public Instruction of Wisconsin; July 1, 1921 – July 1, 1949	Succeeded by George Earl Watson
