= Charles P. Cary =

American educator (1856–1943)

17th Superintendent of Public Instruction of Wisconsin
- In office January 5, 1903 – July 1, 1921
- Preceded by: Lorenzo D. Harvey
- Succeeded by: John Callahan

Personal details
- Born: Charles Preston Cary; January 28, 1856 Marshall, Ohio, U.S.
- Died: June 14, 1943 (aged 87) Madison, Wisconsin, U.S.
- Resting place: Forest Hill Cemetery, Madison
- Party: Republican
- Spouse: Myra Pugsley (m. 1892–1943)
- Children: Lucian Cary; (b. 1886; died 1971)
- Education: University of Chicago
- Occupation: Educator

Charles Preston Cary (January 28, 1856 – June 14, 1943) was an American educator and Republican politician from Wisconsin. He served as the 17th Superintendent of Public Instruction of Wisconsin; with 18 years in office, he was the second longest-serving superintendent in Wisconsin history, serving from 1903 to 1921. Outside of his years in elected office, he also served several years as head of the Wisconsin School for the Deaf, and ran the training department at the Milwaukee State Teachers College from 1893 to 1901.

== Biography ==
Cary had German and English ancestry. Born in Marshall, Ohio, he went to Ohio Central Normal School and worked in education in Ohio, Kansas, and Nebraska. In 1893, he moved to Wisconsin and was the head of the Milwaukee State Normal School training department (now University of Wisconsin–Milwaukee). He received his bachelor's degree from the University of Chicago. He served as Wisconsin Superintendent of Public Instruction from 1903 to 1921.

Cary was a Republican.

Educational offices
Preceded by Lorenzo D. Harvey	Superintendent of Public Instruction of Wisconsin; January 5, 1903 – July 1, 1921	Succeeded by John Callahan
