= John T. Benson =

American educator (born 1937)

Superintendent of Public Instruction of Wisconsin
- In office July 7, 1993 – July 2, 2001
- Governor: Tommy Thompson
- Preceded by: Herbert J. Grover
- Succeeded by: Elizabeth Burmaster

Personal details
- Born: November 18, 1937 (age 88) Mauston, Wisconsin, U.S.
- Education: Luther College; University of Minnesota
- Occupation: Educator

John T. Benson (born November 18, 1937) is an American educator and former Superintendent of Public Instruction of Wisconsin (1993–2001).

Born in Mauston, Wisconsin, Benson graduated from Luther College in 1960 and received his master's degree from the University of Minnesota in 1963. Benson was director of education for Marshall Public Schools and was assistant supervisor of Public Instruction of Wisconsin.
