= Superintendent of Public Instruction of Wisconsin =

Head of the Wisconsin's Department of Public Instruction

- Seal of Wisconsin

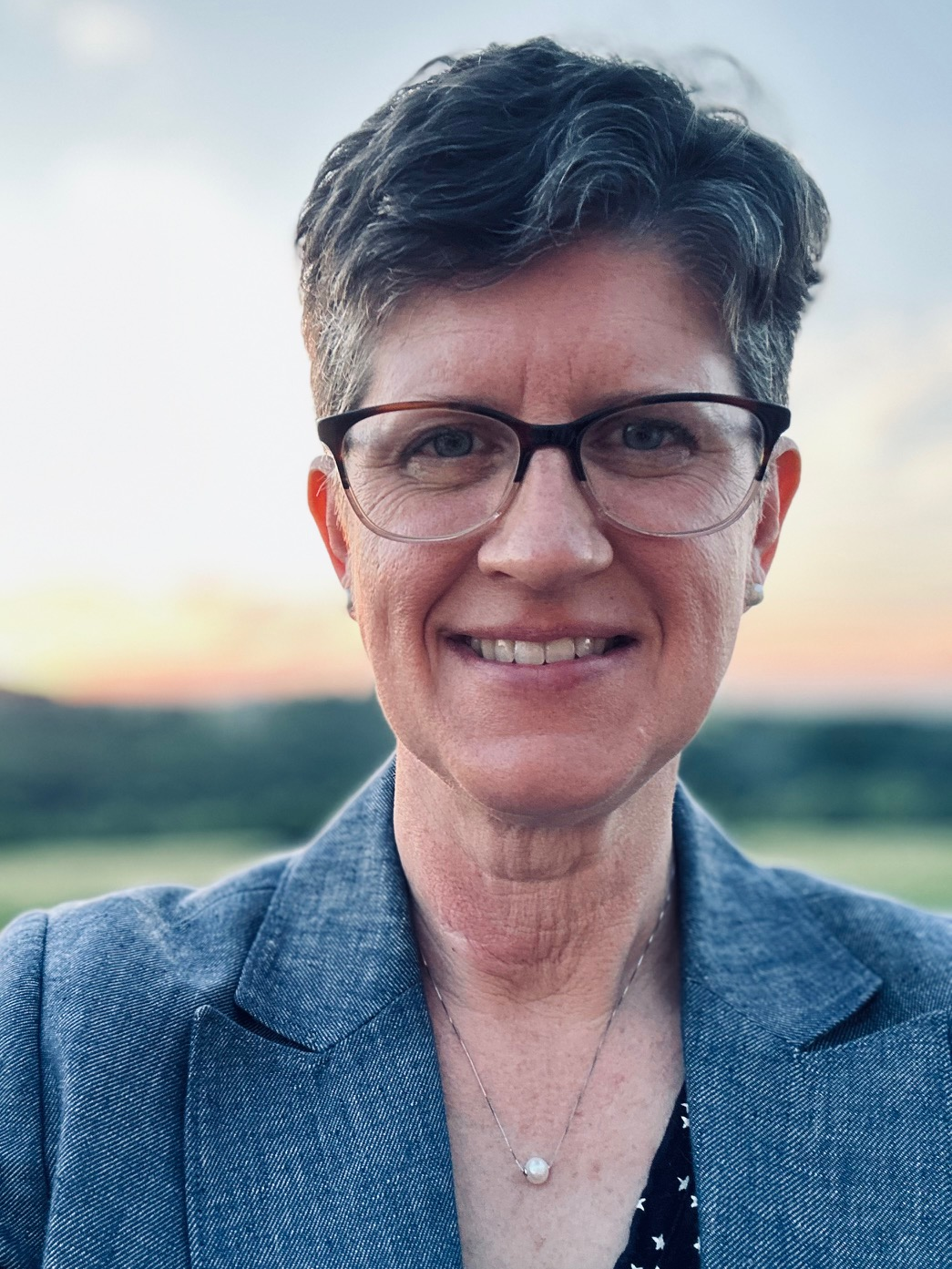
- Incumbent; Jill Underly since July 5, 2021
- Wisconsin Department of Public Instruction
- Style: Mr. or Madam Superintendent (informal); The Honorable (formal)
- Seat: Wisconsin State Capitol; Madison, Wisconsin
- Appointer: Spring election (Nonpartisan)
- Term length: Four years, no term limits
- Constituting instrument: Wisconsin Constitution of 1848, Article X
- Inaugural holder: Eleazer Root
- Formation: January 1, 1849 (177 years ago)
- Salary: $127,047
- Website: Official page

The superintendent of public instruction, sometimes referred to as the state superintendent of schools, is a constitutional officer within the executive branch of the Wisconsin state government and head of the Department of Public Instruction. Twenty-eight individuals have held the office since statehood. The incumbent is Jill Underly.

== Election and term of office ==
The superintendent of public instruction is elected by the people of Wisconsin on a nonpartisan statewide ballot on the first Tuesday in April during the spring election, six months after each presidential election and at the same time as Justices of the Supreme Court are elected. Upon election and qualification, the state superintendent-elect takes office for a four-year term on the first Monday of July next succeeding. Prior to 1902 however, the state superintendent was elected on a partisan ballot in the same manner as the secretary of state, state treasurer, and attorney general. Likewise, before ratification of a constitutional amendment in November 1982, the state superintendent was elected to a two-year term. There is no limit to the number of terms a state superintendent may hold.

In the event of a vacancy in the office, the governor may appoint a replacement to fill the remainder of the term. The state superintendent may also be removed from office through an impeachment trial.

== Powers and duties ==
The state superintendent has broad superintending authority over Wisconsin's public schools, as prescribed by the state constitution. Indeed, the superintendent of public instruction does not share responsibility for education policy with a separate state board of education, making the incumbent one of the most powerful chief state school officers in the United States. To this end, the state superintendent ascertains the condition of Wisconsin's public schools, stimulates interest in education, and promotes the sharing of means and methods employed in improving schools. The state superintendent has the duty to supervise and inspect public schools and day schools for disabled children, advise local principals, and offer assistance in organization and reorganization. The state superintendent also publishes and disseminates an array of reports, bulletins and other media for the public on K-12 education, including on school organization, attendance, management practices, and performance.

Furthermore, the state superintendent audits the accounts of Cooperative Educational Service Agencies (CESAs) organized in Wisconsin, supervises boundary reorganization, advises CESA administrators, and provide assistance in organizing CESA agencies. Appeals from school districts and CESAs are adjudicated by the state superintendent as well. Likewise, the state superintendent licenses teachers and certifies school nurses practicing in Wisconsin, oversees and promotes public libraries, approves all driver education courses offered by school districts and like units of government, and acts as agent for the receipt and disbursement of federal and state aids to school districts.

Aside from his or her routine functions, the state superintendent holds an annual convention of school district administrators and CESA coordinators. In addition, the state superintendent is a member of the board of regents of the University of Wisconsin System, the board of trustees of the Wisconsin Technical College System, the Wisconsin Educational Communications Board, and the Higher Educational Aids Board.

== Failed attempts to weaken office ==
During his time as governor, Tommy Thompson took major steps to transfer decision making power from elected constitutional officers and independent agencies to his political appointees. Among the more salient cases, an attempt was made through the 1997 biennial budget to transfer education administration to an appointed education secretary, causing the then-Superintendent of Public Instruction John T. Benson to see most of the office's powers gutted. In the resulting court case, Thompson v. Craney, 199 Wis. 2d 674, 546 N.W.2d 123 (1996), the Supreme Court ruled that the governor could not reallocate or diminish the powers of the state superintendent by appointing a new secretary of education in charge of a Department of Education, as doing so would be unconstitutional.

== See also ==
- List of superintendents of public instruction of Wisconsin
