= Charles Holt =

Charles Holt may refer to:

- Charles A. Holt (born 1948), behavioral economist at the University of Virginia
- Charles C. Holt, economist at the University of Texas at Austin
- Charles John Holt, better known as Jack Holt (actor)
- Charles John Holt III, better known as Tim Holt, Jack Holt's actor grandson

== See also ==
- Charles B. Holt House, a rock house in Charlottesville, Virginia
- Charles Holte (disambiguation)
- Charlie Holt, American ice hockey coach
- Charlie Holt (Episcopal clergyman)
