= Francis Huger Rutledge =

American bishop

The Right Reverend Francis Huger Rutledge D.D., S.T.D.
- Bishop of Florida
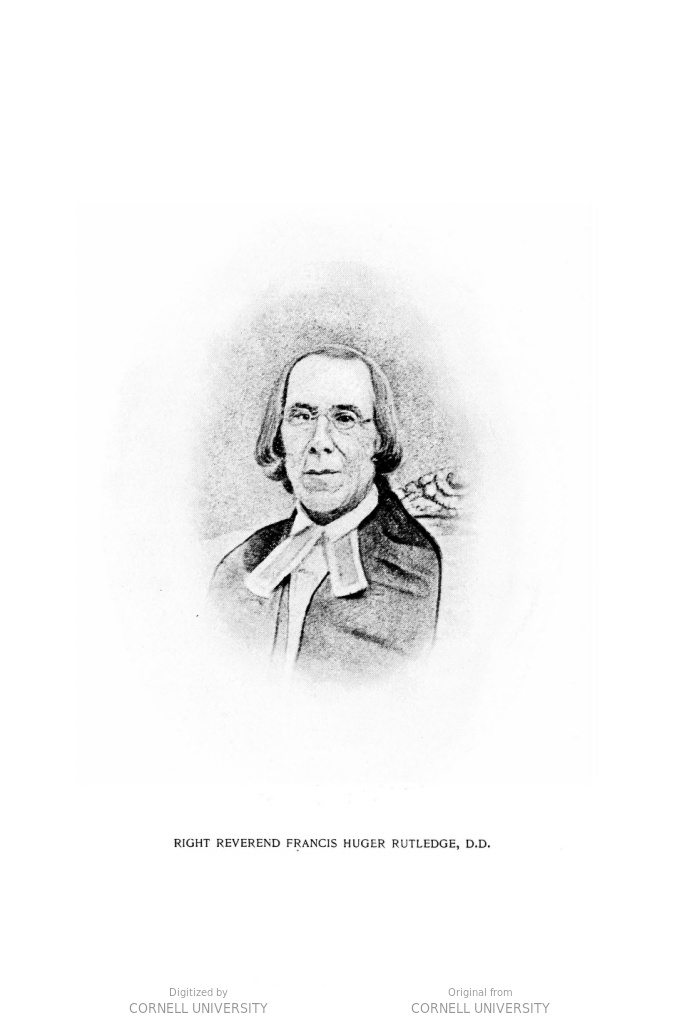
- Church: Episcopal Church
- Diocese: Florida
- Elected: January 9, 1851
- In office: 1851–1866
- Successor: John F. Young

Orders
- Ordination: November 20, 1825 by Nathaniel Bowen
- Consecration: October 15, 1851 by Christopher Edwards Gadsden

Personal details
- Born: April 11, 1799 Charleston, South Carolina, United States
- Died: November 6, 1866 (aged 67) Tallahassee, Florida, United States
- Buried: Church of the Holy Cross (Stateburg, South Carolina)
- Denomination: Anglican
- Parents: Hugh Rutledge & Mary Golightly Huger

Francis Huger Rutledge (April 11, 1799 – November 6, 1866) was the first Episcopal bishop of Florida.

== Early life ==
Rutledge was born in Charleston, South Carolina, the son of Hugh Rutledge and Mary (Golightly) Rutledge. Francis spent his formative years either at his family's townhouse in Charleston or on their plantation in Stateburg, South Carolina. He graduated from Yale College in 1820, and from the General Theological Seminary in 1823. Rutledge was ordained deacon on May 9, 1823, by the Bishop of South Carolina Nathaniel Bowen, and began officiating at Christ Church the same year. He was ordained priest in St Paul's Church, Radcliffe, South Carolina, on November 20, 1825, by Bishop Bowen. He then moved to become rector of Grace Church, Sullivan's Island, in 1827. In 1840, Francis moved from South Carolina and took charge of Trinity Parish in Saint Augustine. In 1845, he moved to Tallahassee, Florida and became rector of St. John's Church.

== Bishop of Florida ==
Rutledge was elected Bishop of the new diocese of Florida in 1851. He was the 53rd bishop in the ECUSA, and was consecrated by Bishops Christopher E. Gadsden, Stephen Elliott, and Nicholas Hamner Cobbs. When the American Civil War started, Rutledge was an advocate for secession, even agreeing to pay $500 to the state treasury as soon as the secession ordinance had passed. He died in 1866 and is buried in his native South Carolina.

== Family ==
His family on both sides was wealthy and well established. His father, Hugh, was a lawyer and eventually served as Chancellor on the Court of Vice Admiralty in Charleston. Francis also had two uncles, John Rutledge, who was governor of South Carolina as well as a chief justice of the United States, and Edward Rutledge, a signer of the Declaration of Independence, and also a governor of South Carolina. Both his father and his uncle, Edward, would end up captured by the British during the American Revolution and were held as political prisoners in Castillo de San Marcos, in Saint Augustine in 1780, a city that Francis would call home several decades later. His grandfather on his mother's side was Benjamin Huger, a major during the American Revolution. And finally, his uncle on his mother's side was Francis Kinloch Huger, a physician and artillery officer who was most well known for his failed attempt to rescue Gilbert du Motier, Marquis de Lafayette from captivity in Austria during the French Revolution. He returned to America in 1798, only months before his sister Mary gave birth. While there is no written record to corroborate, many believe that Francis Rutledge was named after his daring uncle.
