= Frank S. Cerveny =

American Episcopalian bishop (1933–2026)

The Right Reverend Frank S. Cerveny
- Bishop of Florida
- Church: Episcopal Church
- Diocese: Florida
- In office: 1974–1992
- Predecessor: E. Hamilton West
- Successor: Stephen H. Jecko
- Previous post: Coadjutor Bishop of Florida (1974)

Orders
- Ordination: December 1958
- Consecration: May 23, 1974 by John E. Hines

Personal details
- Born: June 4, 1933 Ludlow, Massachusetts, U.S.
- Died: January 7, 2026 (aged 92)
- Denomination: Anglican
- Parents: Frank Charles Cerveny & Julia Victoria Kulig
- Spouse: Emmy Thomas Pettway
- Children: 3

Frank Stanley Cerveny (June 4, 1933 – January 7, 2026) was an American Episcopalian bishop. He was the sixth bishop of the Diocese of Florida and the 699th bishop in the Episcopal Church in the United States of America, a province of the Anglican Communion.

== Early life ==
Frank Cerveny was born in Ludlow, Massachusetts, in the Springfield, Massachusetts metropolitan area and grew up during the Depression. He graduated from Trinity College in 1955 with a Bachelor of Arts, then earned a master of divinity from the General Theological Seminary in 1958. Cerveny was awarded four honorary doctorates.

His first parish was in Miami, Florida, at the Church of the Resurrection, where he was ordained as a priest in December 1958. Next, Cerveny served on the staff of Trinity Church in New York City for several years. He married Emmy Thomas Pettway on November 1, 1961, and they had three children. He became rector of St. Luke's Episcopal Church in Jackson, Tennessee, in 1963, then led St. John's Episcopal Church in Knoxville, Tennessee, beginning in 1969.

Cerveny was called to Jacksonville, Florida, in July 1972 and served as dean at St. John's Cathedral. He was elected bishop coadjutor on February 23, 1974, and consecrated on May 23, 1974, as the sixth bishop of the Episcopal Diocese of Florida.

== Episcopacy ==
During his 18 years as bishop, membership in the diocese grew, a site for a new diocesan camp was acquired near Live Oak, Florida, Camp Weed was constructed, as was a conference center (which was named in Cerveny's honor). The Episcopal Foundation was established and two programs were begun to help Cuban Episcopalians: Partners in Mission and Companion Diocese relationships. Christian Healing Ministries, created by Doctors Francis and Judith MacNutt in 1981, was embraced by Bishop Cerveny and relocated to Jacksonville, where their international outreach gave hope and comfort to people throughout the world.

Bishop Cerveny served as a member on the National Board for Theological Education; chairmanships included the Presiding Bishop's Select Committee, Deans and Bishops Committee, and the Environmental Stewardship Team. He was a trustee for the University of the South, an official seminary of the Episcopal Church.

In 1992, he retired as bishop and joined the Church Pension Group (CPG) in New York City as executive vice president. He also served as president of the Compass Rose Society.

Cerveny returned to Jacksonville in 1999 and served as clerical trustee of the Jessie Ball duPont Fund from 1998 until the organization's rules required that he retire at age 70. He then became a trustee of the Community Foundation in Jacksonville.

== Personal life and death ==
Cerveny and his wife resided on the St. Johns River in Ortega. He died on January 7, 2026, at the age of 92.

== Bibliography ==
- (autobiography) “You Will Be My Bishop:” A Memoir (Tall Pine Books) ISBN 9798349630620

== See also ==
- List of Episcopal bishops (U.S.)
