= All Saints Episcopal Church (Jacksonville) =

Coordinates: 30.278018°N 81.649305°W

All Saints Episcopal Church Jacksonville, Florida 4171 Hendricks Avenue
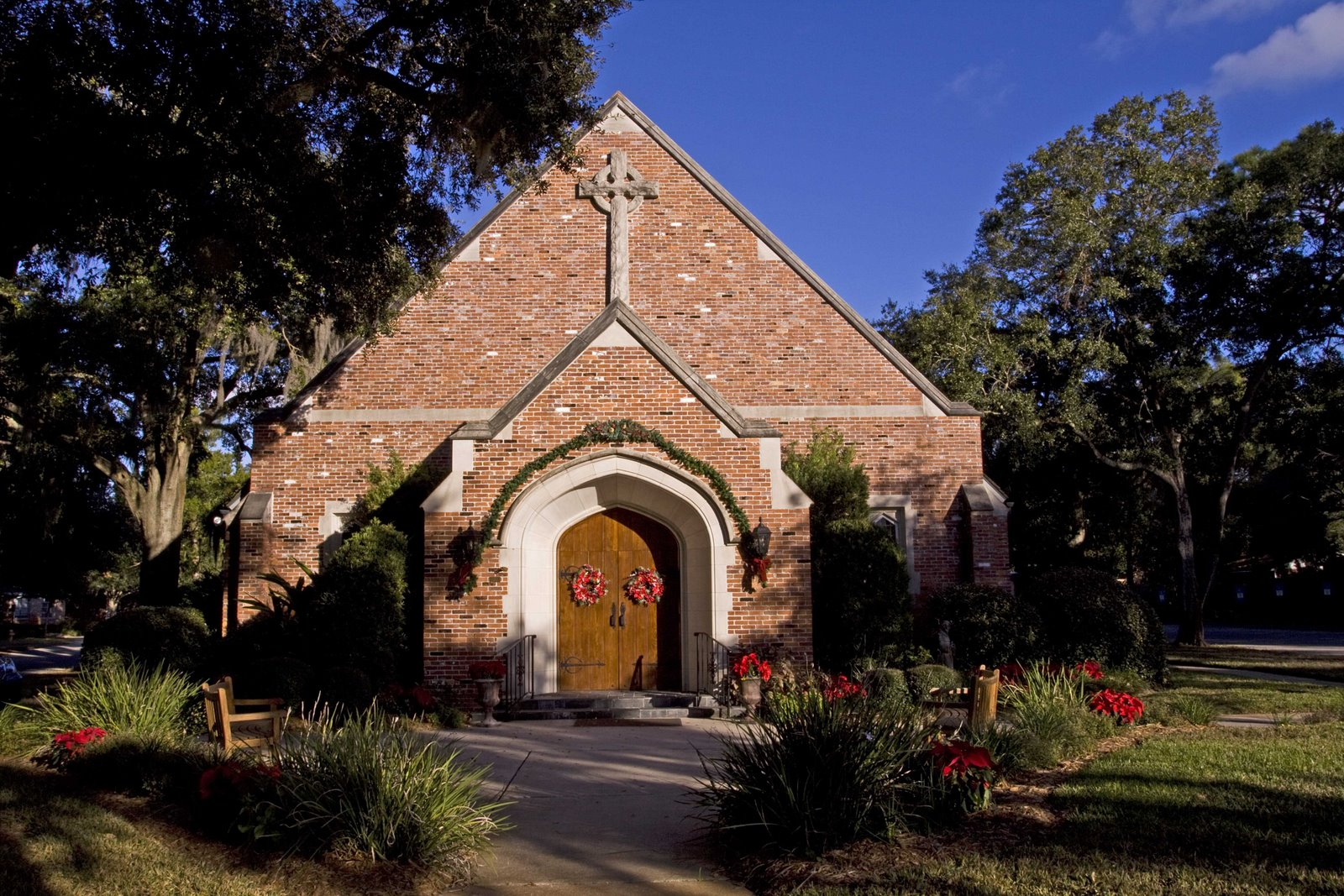
- All Saints Episcopal Church Jacksonville, Florida 4171 Hendricks Avenue
- Denomination: Episcopal
- Churchmanship: Broad church
- Website: www.allsaintsjax.org

History
- Dedication: orig. bldg. 1885; current bldg. 1965

Administration
- Province: IV
- Diocese: Florida; Samuel Howard, Bishop
- Parish: All Saints

Clergy
- Rector: Donavan Cain

All Saints Episcopal Church is an Episcopal church and parish in the San Marco district of Jacksonville, Florida. The parish is in the Episcopal Diocese of Florida. The congregation marked its quasquicentennial on All Saints Sunday, November 7, 2010.

== Current church ==
All Saints Episcopal Church is a mid-sized parish with approximately 400 members. It is the only Episcopal church in the San Marco neighborhood of Jacksonville, Florida. The parish's rector is The Reverend Donavan Cain.

== "Music Through the Ages" concert series ==
All Saints Episcopal Church hosts an annual late fall through early spring classical music series entitled "Music Through the Ages." The free concert series features both locally and nationally known chamber and classical music groups. The most high-profile groups scheduled to perform in the 2011/2012 concert series are the Ritz Chamber Players and American Boychoir. One of the yearly events in the series, always held during Advent, is a service of lessons and carols, patterned after King's College, Cambridge's "Nine Lessons and Carols. "Music Through the Ages" is organized by the church's music director and organist, Dr. Michael Mastronicola.

== Intergenerational care center ==
All Saints Early Learning and Care Center, on the parish's campus, is an intergenerational shared site ministry that provides daycare for children (6 months to 5 years), special needs children (3 to 5 years), special needs adults (18+) and senior citizens. It is the first intergenerational daycare center in the Southeast. The care center is a private non-profit corporation funded by Title XX, the State of Florida, the United Way, private contributions, and fees paid by participants.

== See also ==
- Episcopal Church (United States)
- Province 4 of the Episcopal Church in the United States of America
- Episcopal Diocese of Florida
