= Stephen H. Jecko =

American bishop

The Right Reverend Stephen Hays Jecko D. Min., D.D.
- Bishop of Florida
- Church: Episcopal Church
- Diocese: Florida
- Elected: December 11, 1993
- In office: 1994–2004
- Predecessor: Frank S. Cerveny
- Successor: John Howard
- Other post: Assisting Bishop of Dallas (2004-2007)

Orders
- Ordination: 1968
- Consecration: May 7, 1994 by Edmond L. Browning

Personal details
- Born: January 15, 1940 Washington, D.C., United States
- Died: June 7, 2007 (aged 67) Plano, Texas, United States
- Denomination: Anglican
- Parents: Wilbur Hays Jecko & Martha Constance Herrick
- Spouse: Joan D. Stever
- Children: 2

Stephen Hays Jecko (January 15, 1940 – June 7, 2007) was the seventh bishop of the Diocese of Florida and the 892nd bishop in the Episcopal Church in the United States of America, a province of the Anglican Communion.

== Early years ==
Stephen Jecko was born on January 15, 1940, in Washington, D.C. He learned to fly at an early age, unofficially soloed at 13 and was granted a private pilot's license at the minimum required age of 16. He graduated from Syracuse University in 1964 with a Bachelor of Science in Civil Engineering, married his wife, Joan and the couple had two sons, Sean and Bryan. Jecko was called to the ministry while working as a draftsman. His workspace was near a window that looked down on a church altar with a painting of Jesus, which was his inspiration to join the clergy.

== Parishes ==
=== New York ===
In 1967, the General Theological Seminary granted Jecko a Master of Divinity degree and he began serving in Binghamton, New York as curate at Christ Church. Two years later, he moved to Plainview, New York, at St. Margaret's Church for five years as priest-in-charge. He was then called by St. James' Episcopal Church in Warrenton, Virginia, as associate rector for three years, followed by eight years as rector at Zion Church in Rome, New York. During his time there, he finished his dissertation and was awarded a Doctor of Ministry degree in 1982 from Virginia Theological Seminary.

=== Florida ===
Father Jecko was called to be rector St. Michael's Church in Gainesville, Florida, in 1984 and served there until he was named Assistant to Bishop Cerveny in 1990. When Bishop Cerveny announced his plans to retire, Father Jecko was elected Coadjutor bishop on December 11, 1993, and consecrated on May 7, 1994, as the 7th Bishop of the Episcopal Diocese of Florida. Soon after his consecration as bishop, he was awarded honorary degrees of Doctor of Divinity from the General Theological Seminary and Virginia Theological Seminary, then a third D.D. from Sewanee: The University of the South less than a year later.

== Episcopacy ==
During his 10 years as bishop of Florida, Bishop Jecko served as board chairman for Episcopal Children's Services Inc., board member for Episcopal High School of Jacksonville and Trustee at University of the South, the official seminary of the Episcopal Church, USA. He supported Christian Healing Ministries, created by Doctors Francis and Judith MacNutt in 1981, which was nurtured by his predecessor, Bishop Cerveny.

The bishop has an obligation to visit every parish in the diocese regularly. He used his pilot's license to help fulfill that duty by flying to distant parishes. Bishop Jecko was a priest associate of the Order of the Holy Cross and a chaplain in the International Order of St. Luke the Physician.

The election and consecration of Gene Robinson, an openly gay priest in the Episcopal church, was controversial, resulting in heated debate and intense feelings throughout the Episcopal Church in the United States. Bishop Jecko conducted a series of discussions and meetings for clergy, vestries and parishioners in an attempt to resolve the issue that was dividing conservative and liberal Christians. Privately, he was opposed the church's position on the issue, and decided to leave the diocese rather than enforce the will of the national church.

== Retirement ==
In 2004, he retired as Bishop of Florida and moved to Plano, Texas, where he accepted an offer to be Assistant Bishop at the Episcopal Diocese of Dallas. The Jessie Ball duPont Fund named Bishop Jecko as their Clerical Trustee. He was also a member of the National Advisory Board for Christian Healing Ministries and assisted the American Anglican Council by acting as liaison for congregations wanting to break away from the Episcopal Church and Global South Anglican bishops offering to provide oversight. Bishop Jecko was also a leader in the creation of the Anglican Communion Network in 2004.

Bishop Jecko was diagnosed with cancer in early 2007, and the treatments appeared to be successful. However, complications developed quickly and he died on June 7, 2007, at Baylor Regional Medical Center.

== See also ==
- Historical list of bishops of the Episcopal Church in the United States of America
