= St. Mary's Episcopal Church (Madison, Florida) =

Historic church in Florida, United States

- U.S. National Register of Historic Places
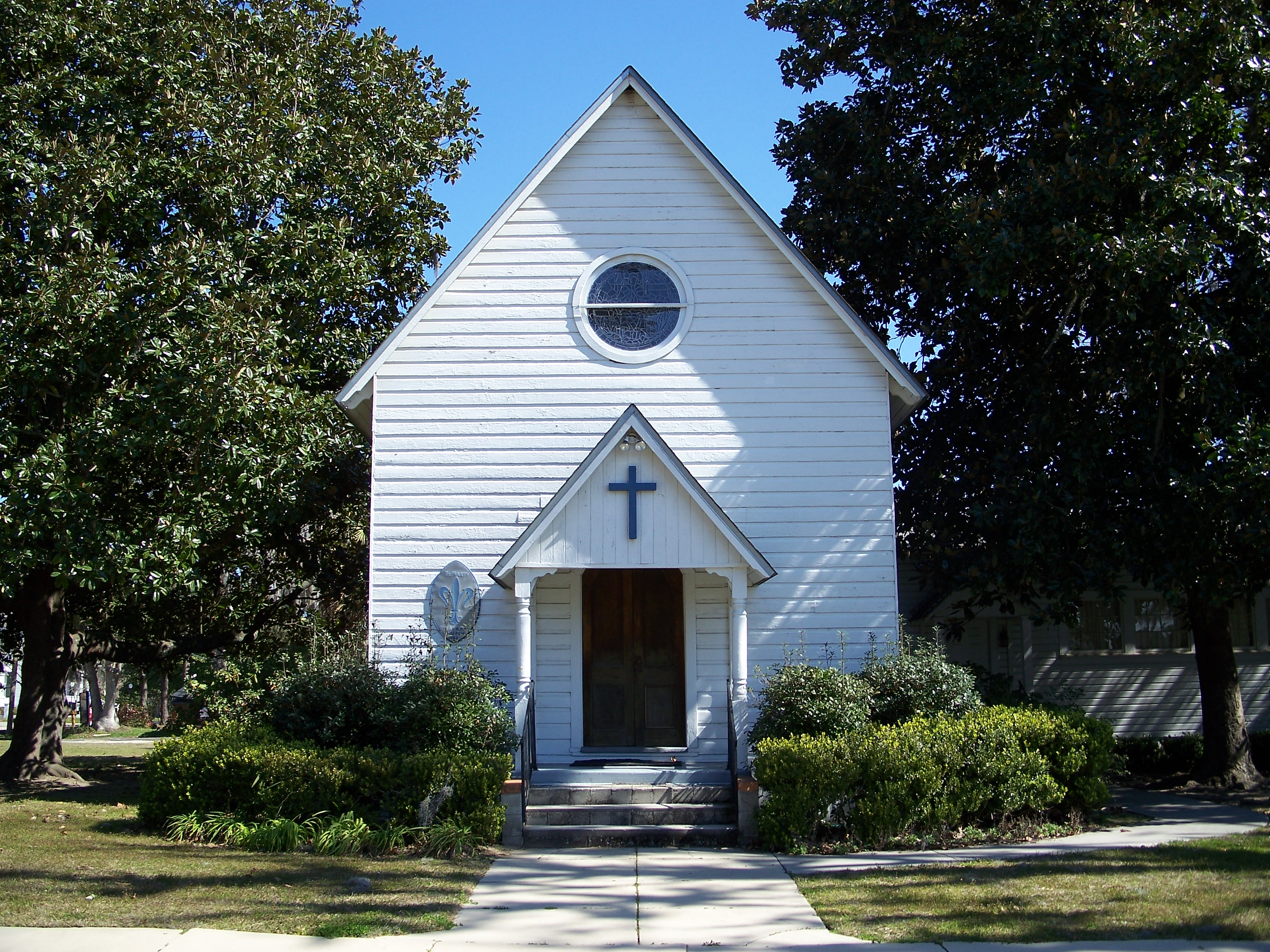

- Location within Florida Location within the United States
- Location: Madison, Florida
- Coordinates: 30°28′11″N 83°24′50″W
- Built: 1879-1881
- Architectural style: Late Gothic Revival
- NRHP reference No.: 97000351
- Added to NRHP: April 28, 1997

The St. Mary's Episcopal Church is an historic Carpenter Gothic Episcopal church located at 140 Northeast Horry Street in Madison, Florida in the United States.

Although the congregation was established in 1859, it went dormant during the American Civil War, and efforts to build a permanent church did not begin in earnest until 1879. The cornerstone was laid on August 1 of that year, and the completed church was consecrated on May 1, 1883, by John F. Young, second Bishop of Florida.

On April 28, 1997, it was added to the U.S. National Register of Historic Places.

== Gallery ==
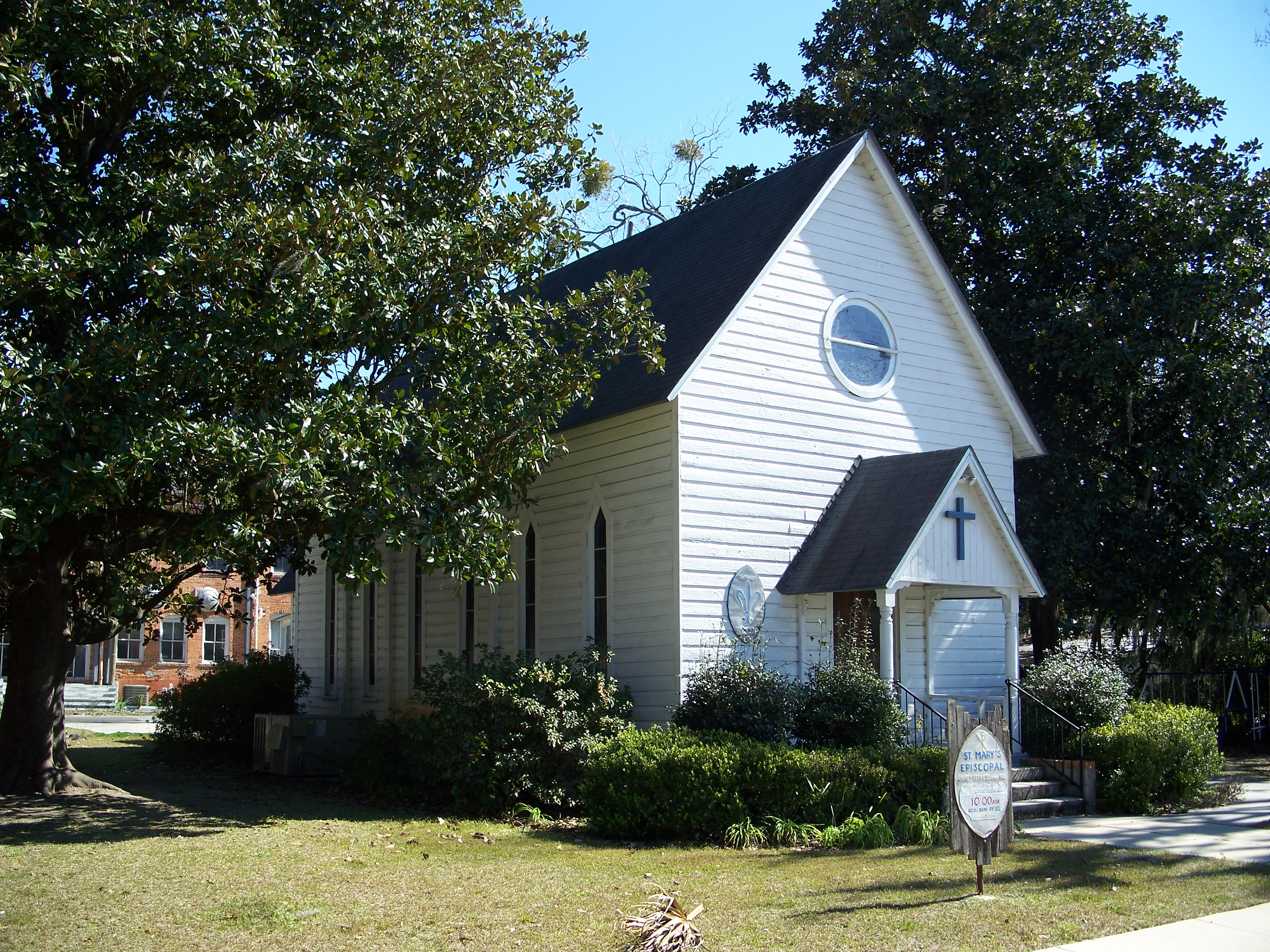
