= E. Hamilton West =

Episcopal Church bishop

The Right Reverend Edward Hamilton West D.D.
- Bishop of Florida
- Church: Episcopal Church
- Diocese: Florida
- In office: 1956–1974
- Predecessor: Frank Juhan
- Successor: Frank S. Cerveny
- Previous post: Coadjutor Bishop of Florida (1948-1956)

Orders
- Ordination: December 1931 by Middleton S. Barnwell
- Consecration: October 4, 1948 by Henry Knox Sherrill

Personal details
- Born: July 25, 1906 Birmingham, Alabama, United States
- Died: July 10, 1977 (aged 70) Jacksonville, Florida, United States
- Buried: Evergreen Cemetery (Jacksonville, Florida)
- Denomination: Anglican
- Parents: Edward Hamilton West & Clarine Buell
- Spouse: Charlotte Matthews
- Children: 3

Edward Hamilton West (July 25, 1906 – July 10, 1977) was a bishop of The Episcopal Church, serving in the Diocese of Florida from 1948 to 1974.

== Early life and education ==
West was born on July 25, 1906, in Birmingham, Alabama, the son of Edward Hamilton West and Clarine Buell. He was educated at the Birmingham–Southern College and graduated with a Bachelor of Arts in 1926. He then studied at the Virginia Theological Seminary and graduated with a Bachelor of Divinity in 1931. He also graduated with Master of Arts in 1934 from the University of Idaho. On August 29, 1933, he married Charlotte Matthews, and together had three children.

== Ordained ministry ==
West was ordained deacon in June 1931 by Bishop William G. McDowell of Alabama and priest in December of that year by Bishop Middleton S. Barnwell of Georgia. He then became minister- in-charge of St Agnes' Church Sandpoint, Idaho and of St Mary's Church in Bonners Ferry, Idaho in 1931. In 1932 he became rector of St Mark's Church in Moscow, Idaho, and in 1935 became chaplain of the Chapel of Incarnation of the University of Florida in Gainesville, Florida. In 1941 went to Augusta, Georgia to serve as rector of Saint Paul's Church. He also served as deputy to the General Convention of 1943 and 1946.

== Bishop ==
On April 28, 1948, West was elected on the 12th ballot as Coadjutor Bishop of Florida during a special convention which took place in St John's Church, Jacksonville, Florida. He was consecrated October 4, 1948 by Presiding Bishop Henry Knox Sherrill. He succeeded as diocesan on February 1, 1956. In 1964, he ordered all churches under his jurisdiction to end racial segregation. He retired on December 31, 1974.
