= John F. Young =

American Episcopal priest; lyricist; bishop of Florida

The Right Reverend John Freeman Young S.T.D.
- Bishop of Florida
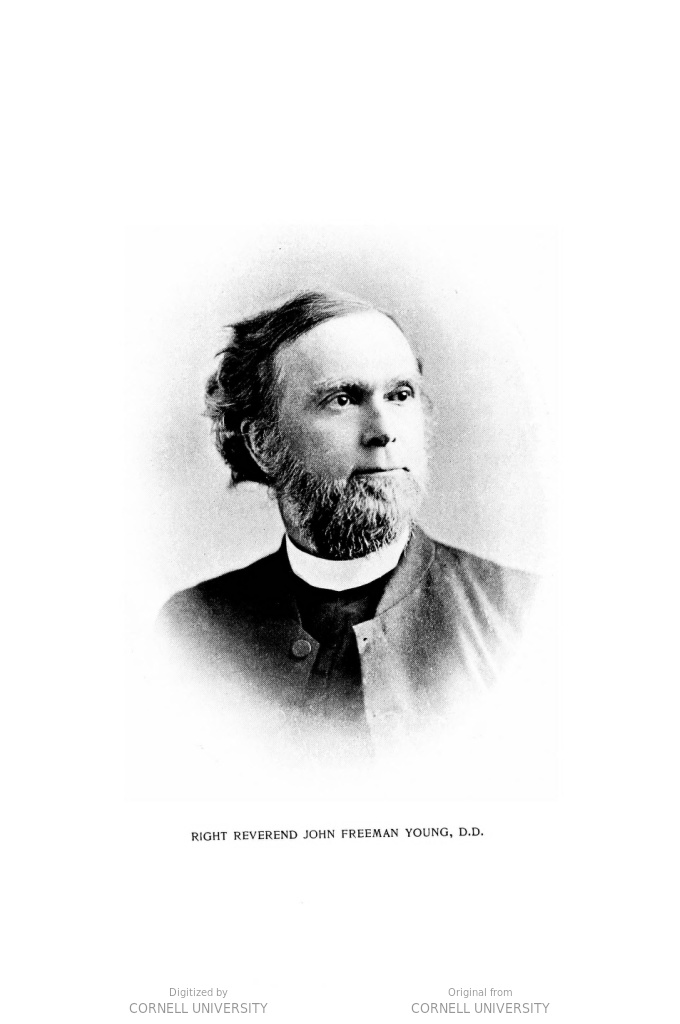
- Church: Episcopal Church
- Diocese: Florida
- Elected: 1867
- In office: 1867–1885
- Predecessor: Francis Huger Rutledge
- Successor: Edwin Gardner Weed

Orders
- Ordination: January 11, 1846 by Stephen Elliott
- Consecration: July 25, 1867 by John Henry Hopkins

Personal details
- Born: October 30, 1820 Pittston, Maine, United States
- Died: November 15, 1885 (aged 65) New York City, New York, United States
- Buried: Old City Cemetery, Jacksonville, Florida, United States
- Denomination: Anglican
- Parents: John Young & Emma Freeman
- Spouse: Harriett R. Ogden & Mary Stuart Stockton
- Education: Virginia Theological Seminary

John Freeman Young (October 30, 1820 – November 15, 1885), author of the most commonly sung English-language translation of the Christmas carol Silent Night, became the second bishop of Florida in 1867.

== Early life and education ==
Young was born on October 30, 1820, in Pittston, Maine, the son of John Young and Emma Freeman. He was educated at the Maine Wesleyan Seminary and later studied at Wesleyan University in Middletown, Connecticut, but dropped out after his freshman year. After joining the Episcopal Church, he studied at the Virginia Theological Seminary, from where he graduated in 1845. In 1865 he was awarded a Doctor of Sacred Theology from Columbia University.

Young was first married to Harriett R. Ogden of New York City and then to Mary Stuart Stockton of Florida, daughter of William Tennent Stockton.

== Ordained ministry ==
Young was ordained deacon on April 20, 1845, and was appointed to St John's Church in Jacksonville, Florida. On January 11, 1846, he was ordained a priest at St John's Church in Tallahassee, Florida, and then became the rector of St John's Church in Jacksonville, Florida. In December 1847, he moved to Brazoria County, Texas, where he served as a missionary, while in November 1850 he moved to Livingston, Mississippi. Between 1852 and 1860, he served as rector of Assumption Parish, Louisiana in Napoleonville, Louisiana. In 1860 he became assistant rector of Trinity Church in New York City. He was the secretary for the Russo-Greek Committee of the General Convention and was an ecumenical envoy to the Russian Orthodox Church.

== Bishop ==
In 1867, Young was elected as the second bishop of the Episcopal diocese of Florida and was consecrated on July 25, 1867, in Trinity Church, by the Presiding Bishop John Henry Hopkins. He retained the post till his death in 1885. In later years, while still serving as an active Bishop, he also lectured in Liturgics and Ecclesiastical Music at The University of the South.

== Silent Night ==
Young is well known for his translation of the famous German Christmas carol Silent Night into English in 1859. His English translation is the most frequently sung English text today. It was translated from three of Joseph Mohr original six verses and first published in a 16-page pamphlet titled Carols For Christmas Tide. The pamphlet also included other carols, like Earth Today Rejoices, Good Christian Men Rejoice, Here Is Joy For Every Age, Earthly Friends Will Change And Falter, Royal Day That Chasest Gloom, and Good King Wenceslas.
