= Tyrone Gayle =

Democratic campaign staffer, spokesman & aide (1987-2018)

- Born: November 12, 1987; Toronto, Ontario, Canada
- Died: October 25, 2018 (aged 30); New York City, New York, U.S.
- Education: Clemson University (BA) Episcopal School of Jacksonville
- Years active: 2010–2018
- Spouse: Elizabeth Bradstreet Foster (m. 2018)

Tyrone Oliver Gayle (November 12, 1987 – October 25, 2018) was a Democratic campaign staffer, spokesman and aide. He worked for Senators Tim Kaine, Hillary Clinton, and Kamala Harris.

== Early life and education ==
Gayle was born in Toronto to parents who both worked in medicine. After the family moved to Jacksonville, Florida in 1992, his mother worked as a nurse at the Mayo Clinic Florida and his father, a pediatric intensive care specialist, worked at the Wolfson Children's Hospital. Gayle grew up in Jacksonville and attended high school at the Episcopal School of Jacksonville. He contributed to his high school's newspaper and interned at WJXT and The Florida Times-Union. He also was a member of the cross-country and track teams, and won state championships as a member of the 2003 cross-country and 2005 4x800 relay teams.

He continued as a D-I athlete at Clemson University. Gayle graduated in 2010 from Clemson University with a bachelor's degree in communication studies. Gayle initially planned to pursue a journalism career, but developed "an itch to pursue politics" during his junior year at Clemson University. He moved to Washington, D.C. after graduating.

== Career ==
Gayle briefly worked for the Center for American Progress, and worked for Media Matters for America for a year.

He became a driver and special assistant to Tim Kaine, the 70th Governor of Virginia, during 15 months of his 2012 Senate campaign. They bonded over a shared interest in college football and other sports. Gayle worked for the United States Senate Democratic Steering and Outreach Committee in 2013. He was a spokesman for the Democratic Congressional Campaign Committee in 2014, the midterm election year. The trade magazine Campaigns and Elections named him "a rising star" in 2015.

Gayle began working for Hillary Clinton at her personal Manhattan office as part of a press team before she announced her 2016 presidential campaign. Until the 2016 presidential election, Gayle worked as a spokesman for Clinton in her Brooklyn headquarters.

He sent her an email recommending Kaine as her running mate:

During the 2012 campaign cycle, I traveled all across Virginia with him spending upwards of 15 hours each day for 15 months on the road as his special assistant. I can personally attest to his incredible character, integrity, competency and ability to get things done. I believe he would be a great choice, and be an effective governing partner.

Clinton chose Kaine as her running mate several days after the email, on July 22. She was thankful to Gayle for the recommendation.

== Marriage ==
Gayle met Elizabeth Bradstreet Foster, known as Beth, in 2012; she was also active in politics. She worked as a staffer for Barack Obama's 2012 reelection campaign and legislative assistant to Senator Patty Murray (D-WA), in Richmond, Virginia. Kaine officiated their wedding on May 5, 2018, at the Septenary Winery at the Seven Oaks Farm in Charlottesville, Virginia.

== Illness and death ==
Gayle was diagnosed with stage IV colorectal cancer in late March 2016. He had successful colon and liver surgeries and went through chemotherapies, while still working for Clinton. The treatments were successful, but in 2017 he suffered a relapse and the disease progressed.

As reported by The New York Times, Gayle's wife Beth said that he "had refused to let his illness slow him down. From the moment he got up in the morning to when he went to bed, he was not the kind of guy to sit around." Gayle died at the Memorial Sloan Kettering Cancer Center in Manhattan on October 25, 2018.

Kaine wrote on Facebook, "All who crossed Tyrone's path were affected by his warmth, humor, and positive energy." Harris wrote on Twitter: "Tyrone Gayle was an invaluable and beloved member of our team and family. He never lost faith in our ability to do good for the people in this country. Sending his family and courageous wife, Beth, my love and condolences. #GayleNation". Clinton said that Gayle was "one of the fiercest fighters we will ever know".
