= St. Mark's Episcopal Church (Starke, Florida) =

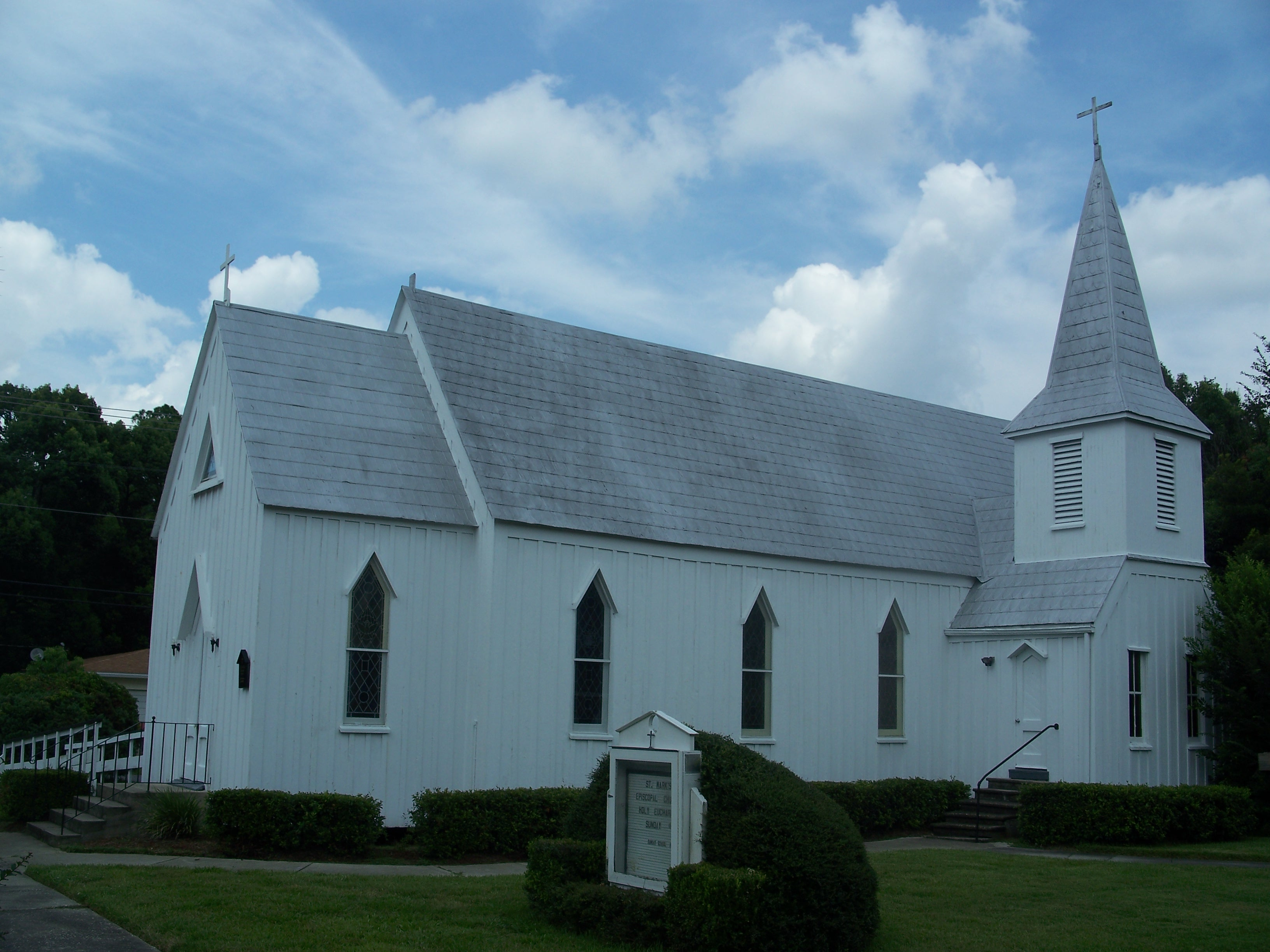
- Interactive map of the St. Mark's Episcopal Church area

General information
- Architectural style: Carpenter Gothic.
- Location: 212 North Church St., Starke, Florida, United States
- Coordinates: 29.94432°N 82.10631°W
- Construction started: 1880
- Completed: 1880

Technical details
- Structural system: One story wooden frame building with two story rear side entrance/bell tower

Design and construction
- Architect: Robert S. Schuyler

St. Mark's Episcopal Church, is an historic Episcopal church of Carpenter Gothic design located today at 212 North Church Street in Starke, Florida, United States. Designed by Fernandina architect Robert S. Schuyler, it was built as All Saints Episcopal Church in 1880 some 20 miles to the south in Fairbanks in Alachua County on land donated by Fernandina attorney, George Fairbanks, who founded Fairbanks. After disastrous freezes in the 1890s destroyed the Fairbanks citrus groves, membership in All Saints declined and the church was closed. In 1900 it was moved to its present location and renamed St. Marks. All that remains of All Saints in Fairbanks today is its overgrown cemetery.

In 1989 St. Mark's was listed in A Guide to Florida's Historic Architecture, published by the University of Florida Press.

Today St. Mark's is an active parish in the Episcopal Diocese of Florida. Its rector is the Rev. Dennis O'Neill.
