= Charles Holte =

Charles Holte may refer to:

- Sir Charles Holte, 3rd Baronet (1649–1722) of the Holte baronets, MP for Warwickshire
- Sir Charles Holte, 6th Baronet (1721–1782) of the Holte baronets, MP for Warwickshire

== See also ==
- Charles Holt (disambiguation)
- Holte (surname)
