= Eleazer Root =

American politician, 1st Superintendent of Public Instruction of Wisconsin

1st Superintendent of Public Instruction of Wisconsin
- In office January 1, 1849 – January 5, 1852
- Governor: Nelson Dewey
- Preceded by: Position established
- Succeeded by: Azel P. Ladd

Member of the Wisconsin State Assembly from the Marquette–Waushara district
- In office January 5, 1852 – January 1, 1853
- Preceded by: Charles Waldo
- Succeeded by: Edwin B. Kelsey and Ezra Wheeler

Personal details
- Born: March 6, 1802 Canaan, New York
- Died: July 25, 1887 (aged 85) St. Augustine, Florida
- Resting place: Evergreen Cemetery; St. Augustine, Florida
- Party: Whig
- Spouses: Harriet Dayton; Laura
- Children: Cornelia Fanning (Ingraham)^{(b. 1831; died 1898)}; Mary Marvin Root^{(b. 1836; died 1929)}; George W. Root^{(b. 1840; died 1863)}; Anna Locke (Durlin)^{(b. 1844; died 1933)}
- Education: Williams College

Eleazer Root (March 6, 1802 – July 25, 1887) was an American educator and Episcopalian priest from New York, who moved to Wisconsin as a young man and spent much of his career and adult life there. He served a term in the Wisconsin Assembly and was appointed as the first Superintendent of Public Instruction. Because of his health, in his last years he moved to St. Augustine, Florida, serving as rector of Trinity Parish from 1874 to 1884. Root is considered as one of the founding fathers of Wisconsin and was also instrumental in organizing the University of Wisconsin as a member of the first board of regents.

== Early life and education ==
Born in Canaan, New York, Root graduated from Williams College. He was admitted to the New York bar. After moving briefly to Virginia, Root moved to Waukesha, Wisconsin Territory, where he helped found the present Carroll University. Root took Holy Orders in the Episcopal Church and was ordained to the priesthood.

In 1847, Root served in the second Wisconsin Constitutional Convention and was responsible for authoring Article X of the present Wisconsin Constitution. Largely unchanged to this day, Article X provides for a uniform system of public schools, creates the elected office of Superintendent of Public Instruction to supervise public instruction in every school district, establishes a state university at the seat of government, and prescribes principal and restricted uses to Wisconsin's school trust funds. From 1849 until 1852, Root was appointed and served as the first Superintendent of Public Instruction of Wisconsin. Root was a member of the Whig Party.

In 1852, Root was elected and served a term in the Wisconsin State Assembly. He also served as superintendent of schools in Fond du Lac County, Wisconsin. He then moved to Texas and taught languages in Guadalupe County, Texas, until he returned to Wisconsin after the start of the American Civil War.

For a time, Root lived in St. Louis, Missouri. Because of his health, he moved to St. Augustine, Florida, where he served as rector of Trinity Parish from 1874 to 1884. He died in Jacksonville, Florida.
