= Edwin Gardner Weed =

American Episcopalian bishop (1846-1924)

The Right Reverend Edwin Gardner Weed D.D., S.T.D.
- Bishop of Florida
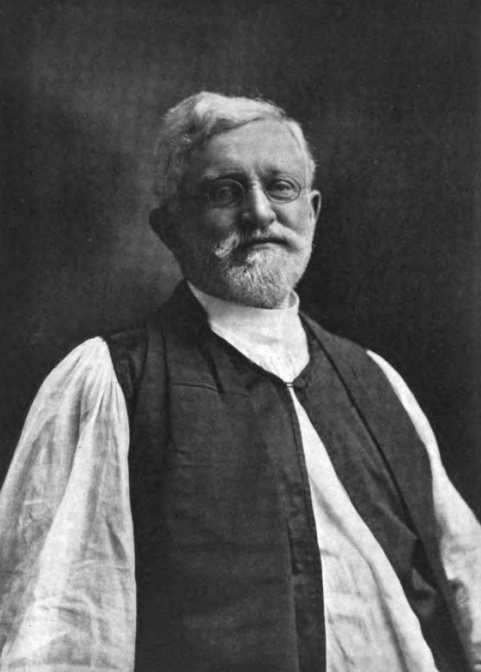
- Church: Episcopal Church
- Diocese: Florida
- Elected: April 2, 1886
- In office: 1886–1924
- Predecessor: John F. Young
- Successor: Frank Juhan

Orders
- Ordination: August 29, 1871 by John W. Beckwith
- Consecration: August 11, 1886 by Charles Todd Quintard

Personal details
- Born: July 23, 1846 Savannah, Georgia, United States
- Died: January 18, 1924 (aged 77) Jacksonville, Florida, United States
- Buried: Evergreen Cemetery (Jacksonville, Florida)
- Denomination: Anglican
- Parents: Henry Davis Weed & Sarah Richards Dunning
- Spouse: Julia Anna McKinne Foster
- Children: 6

Edwin Gardner Weed (July 23, 1846 – January 18, 1924) was the third Bishop of Florida in The Episcopal Church from 1886 till 1924.

== Early life and education ==
Weed was born on July 23, 1846, in Savannah, Georgia, the son of Henry Davis Weed and Sarah Richards Dunning. He was educated at the University of Georgia between 1862 and 1864. He also studied at the General Theological Seminary and graduated in 1870. He was awarded a Doctor of Sacred Theology by Racine College and a Doctor of Divinity from the University of the South. On April 23, 1874, he married Julia Anna McKinne Foster, the daughter of Representative Thomas Flournoy Foster.

== Ordained ministry ==
Weed was ordained deacon on August 24, 1870, and priest on August 29, 1871, on both occasions by Bishop John W. Beckwith of Georgia. He then served as rector of the Church of the Good Shepherd in the Summerville neighborhood of Augusta, Georgia, the only parish where he served. He retained the post till his election as bishop in 1886.

== Episcopacy ==
In 1886, Weed was elected as the third Bishop of Florida, and was consecrated on August 11, 1886, by Bishop Charles Todd Quintard of Tennessee. He retained the post till his death in 1924.
