= Frank Juhan =

American football player, coach, and bishop (1887–1967)

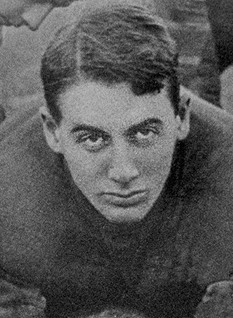
- Juhan c. 1909

Profile
- Position: Center/Linebacker

Personal information
- Born: April 27, 1887; Macon, Georgia, US
- Died: December 31, 1967 (aged 80); Sewanee, Tennessee, US
- Listed height: 5 ft 11 in (1.80 m)
- Listed weight: 160 lb (73 kg)

Career information
- College: Sewanee (1908–1910)

Awards and highlights
- SIAA champion (1909); SIAA middleweight boxing title (1908-09); Walter Camp All-American Honorable Mention (1909); Sewanee All-Time Football Team
- College Football Hall of Fame (Class of 1966)

Other information
- IV Bishop of Florida
- Church: Episcopal Church
- Diocese: Episcopal Diocese of Florida
- Retired: 1956
- Predecessor: Edwin G. Weed
- Successor: E. Hamilton West

Orders
- Ordination: 1911 by James S. Johnston
- Consecration: 1924 by Ethelbert Talbot

Personal details
- Buried: University of the South Cemetery, Sewanee, Tennessee
- Parents: Charles Juhan; Minnie Hervey
- Spouse: Vera Louise MacKnight
- Children: 3

Francis Alexander "June" Juhan (April 27, 1887 – December 31, 1967) was an American football player and coach as well as an Episcopal bishop.

He played center for the Sewanee Tigers football team and was the first roving linebacker in the South, analogous to Germany Schulz's status in football history nationally. He was elected to the College Football Hall of Fame in 1966, and is also a charter member of the Tennessee Sports Hall of Fame and a member of the Sewanee Athletics Hall of Fame.

In 1924, he was appointed the fourth bishop of the Episcopal Diocese of Florida.

== Early life ==
Juhan was born in Macon, Georgia. Soon after, his parents, Charles J. Juhan and Minnie Hervey, moved to Texas. He graduated from West Texas Military Academy in San Antonio, Texas, in 1907. (Note: Another noted WTMA graduate was General Douglas MacArthur, Class of '97.)

== Sewanee ==
Juhan also played baseball, ran track, and was a boxing champion at Sewanee: The University of the South, a small Episcopal school in the mountains of Tennessee. Juhan was a member of the 1909 football team, which won a Southern Intercollegiate Athletic Association (SIAA) title. That year, Juhan was put on Walter Camp's All-America honorable mention.

Juhan was selected for his position on George Trevor's all-time Sewanee football team. He was nominated though not selected for an Associated Press All-Time Southeast 1869-1919 era team.

The Juhan Gym, where Sewanee today plays basketball, is named after him. It was dedicated on June 8, 1957. Juhan was a charter member of the Tennessee Sports Hall of Fame.

Juhan was also a member of the Delta Tau Delta fraternity on campus, and Bishop's Commons on central campus is also named after him.

=== Coaching ===
Juhan assisted his alma mater's football team from 1913 to 1915.

== Ministry ==
After graduating with a Bachelor of Divinity from The University of the South in 1911, he was ordained in the Episcopal Church, first as deacon in June 1911 and then as priest in June 1912 by Bishop James S. Johnston of West Texas. He married Vera Louise MacKnight Spencer on January 3, 1912, and together they had a daughter and two sons. He then became the Chaplain at the West Texas Military Academy and priest-in-charge of Goliad, Texas and Beeville, Texas. In 1913 he became Chaplain at the Sewanee Military Academy, and in 1916 he became Rector of Christ Church in Greenville, South Carolina.

He was consecrated the fourth Bishop of the Episcopal Diocese of Florida on November 25, 1924, by Presiding Bishop Ethelbert Talbot. He was the youngest diocesan bishop in the Episcopal Church at the time of his consecration, and the senior active bishop in the church when he retired in 1956. He also became Chancellor of the University of the South in 1944, a post he retained till 1950. He served as Director of Development for Sewanee after 1956.
