= Charlie Holt (Episcopal clergyman) =

American Episcopal clergyman

The Reverend Charlie Holt
- Rector of St. Mark's Episcopal Church, Jacksonville, Florida, former Bishop Coadjutor-Elect, Diocese of Florida
- Church: Episcopal Church
- Diocese: Episcopal Diocese of Florida
- Previous posts: Associate Rector, Church of St. John the Divine, Houston, Texas, (2017-2022) Rector, St. Peter’s Episcopal Church, Lake Mary, FL, (2001-2017) Assistant Rector, St. John’s Episcopal Church, Charlotte, NC, (1997-2001)

Orders
- Ordination: March 28, 1998

Personal details
- Born: May 24, 1971 (age 55) Gainesville, Florida
- Denomination: Anglican
- Education: University of Florida

Charlie Holt is an American Episcopal clergyman. He became rector of St. Mark's Episcopal Church in Jacksonville, Florida on August 13, 2023. Prior to this he was twice bishop coadjutor-elect of the Episcopal Diocese of Florida. The first was from May 14, 2022 until August 19, 2022, when he renounced his election due to questionable irregularities in his election. He was elected a second time on November 19, 2022. Again, his election was contested and the objections forward to the presiding bishop. The Episcopal Church's court of review issued a report on February 16, 2023. In light of this report and other concerns, Holt did not receive the necessary consents from the bishops and standing committees of other diocese by July 20, 2023. This ended his status as bishop elect.

Several church groups urged that consent not be given. Others, including more than 400 laity across the Diocese of Florida, argued he should be granted consent.

At the time of his first election, he was associate rector of teaching and formation at the Church of St. John the Divine in Houston, Texas. He joined the staff of the Diocese of Florida on August 1, 2022, while objections to his first election were being adjudicated, and remained on the diocesan staff until becoming rector of St. Mark's in August 2023.

Rev. Holt is widely known for his racial reconciliation work in Sanford, Florida, after the shooting death of Trayvon Martin in 2012 and murder trial of George Zimmerman in 2013, however he has been widely criticized for not being LGBTQ+ inclusive.

== Early life and education ==
Holt was born May 24, 1971, in Gainesville, Florida. He graduated from the Episcopal School of Jacksonville and earned a BS degree in Business Administration from the University of Florida in 1993. He began his studies for ministry at the Reformed Theological Seminary, Orlando Campus, and ultimately received the Master of Divinity from Seabury-Western Theological Seminary in Evanston, Illinois in 1997.

== Ministry as a Priest before Election as Bishop ==
=== St. John's Episcopal Church (Charlotte, NC) ===
Holt was ordained in to the diaconate in September 1997 and employed as associate rector of St. John’s Episcopal Church in Charlotte, North Carolina. He was ordained priest the following March. He served as one of four clergy at the parish, where he oversaw all education programs and staff.

=== St. Peter's Episcopal Church (Lake Mary, FL) ===
In 2001, Holt was named rector of St. Peter’s Episcopal Church and school in Lake Mary, Florida, a suburban city near Sanford in the Greater Orlando Metropolitan Area. He served a growing congregation of approximately 600 members and oversaw the St. Peter’s Preschool and Kindergarten. During Holt’s tenure, average Sunday attendance (ASA) grew from 240 to 350 people. Following the shooting death of Trayvon Martin in 2012, which occurred in a condominium development near St. Peter’s, Holt was instrumental in spearheading “Sanford Pastors Connecting,” an alliance of Seminole County churches that promoted peace and unity in the community.

=== Church of St. John the Divine (Houston, TX) ===
In 2017, Holt was named associate rector of teaching and formation at the Church of St. John the Divine in Houston, Texas, one of the 10 largest Episcopal churches in the country. Holt launched the Christian Teaching Center at St. John’s with more than 850 active participants. The Teaching Center seeks to create a community of people who (1) share a personal relationship with Jesus Christ, (2) demonstrate the character of exemplary Christian maturity, and (3) sharpen effective communication skills. The Teaching Center offers a comprehensive set of courses and information about Christian faith and life with a focus on the Bible.

== Elections to be Bishop Coadjutor of Florida ==
=== First Election ===
There were five candidates in the first election. Holt was elected on the third ballot. A formal objection to the election process was filed with the presiding bishop of the Episcopal Church. The objection to the election process claimed that the required clergy quorum for election was not met and that there were procedural and technical flaws with the remote voting process. The diocese's official response to the objection to the process defended the process and charged that the objector's motivation was the result of the process (Holt's election) and not the process itself. The Court of Review of the Episcopal Church released its judgement on the objections on August 15, 2022, and sided with the objectors on most counts. The diocese has thanked the court for its work, did not respond to the findings.

Independent of the review process, some Episcopalians have urged other dioceses to withhold their consent to Holt's election. This is a required part of the election process, but usually a formality. The appeal to deny consent focuses on Holt's views on same-sex marriage and comments about LGBTQ+ people and Black people. His comments regarding race came in the context of the shooting of Trayvon Martin in Sanford, Florida. At that time, Holt was serving a nearby church.

Holt originally did not comment on the objection to the election process pointing out that he was not involved in organizing the election. He has responded in letter and video to the concerns voiced about his views on race and LGBTQ+ people. He has reiterated that he will abide by the polity of the Episcopal Church and not prohibit churches that wish to from performing same-sex weddings and will welcome LGBTQ+ people into the discernment process for ordination. Regarding race, he has explained, that “a larger message intended to be an example of inclusion was reduced to a soundbite suggesting that I support exclusion." He has also shared a series of letters written in support of him by Black pastors in the Sanford area.

Holt rescinded his acceptance of the election on August 19, 2022 citing a desire to have clean processes in his work as a trained mediator.

=== Second Election ===
On August 26, 2022, the diocese announced there would be a second election. It took place November 19, 2022, at Camp Weed. Holt was one of three candidates. The others were Miguel Rosada and Beth Tjoflat. Holt was elected on the first ballot. On November 28, 2022, 29 lay and clergy delegates to the convention filed objections to this second election with the diocese. The diocese forwarded them to the presiding bishop for investigation by a court of review and received the report from the court of review on February 16, 2023, while at the same time leaking the report to a group of objectors who posted it on their Facebook page.

In late March, the standing committee of the Diocese of Florida released a response which has been shared with the court of review report to the dioceses who have 120 days to express their consent to the election. At the same time, Holt released a letter to bishops and standing committees that outlined how he plans to lead if his election is given consent.

A majority of diocesan standing committees and bishops with jurisdiction needed to consent to the election before Holt could be consecrated. They had until July 20, 2023 to do so. Deputies of Color, group of members of the House of Deputies has also released a statement urging dioceses to withhold their consent. Following the release of its February 2023 letter expressing concerns over Holt and the election, the LGBTQ+ Caucus, another group of members of the House of Deputies, published a clarification letter correcting misrepresentations it made of Holt. Holt then released his own open letter that thanked the caucus for the corrections and their “private personal apology.”

After his election, Holt emphasized that as bishop he would not stand in the way of parishes or clergy who wish to hold same-sex weddings. On May 16, 2023, the standing committee of the diocese of Florida sent an appeal to the standing committee and bishops of other diocese urging them to provide consent.

The Diocese of Spokane's standing committee initially opposed Holt's ordination and consecration, but on June 21, 2023 changed its position to "yes."^{[20]}

On July 21, 2023 the diocese and the presiding bishop issued statements saying the consent process was unsuccessful.

== Later Ministry as Priest ==
=== St. Mark's Episcopal Church (Jacksonville, FL) ===
In August 2023, three weeks after the consent process failed, Holt was named rector of St. Mark's Episcopal Church in Jacksonville, Florida.

== Published works ==
- The Christian Life Trilogy: Campaign Manual. Lake Mary, Florida: Bible Study Media, Inc. 2014. ISBN 978-1-942243-07-6
- The Crucified Life: Seven Words from the Cross. Lake Mary, Florida: Bible Study Media, Inc. 2014. ISBN 978-1-942243-03-8
- The Resurrected Life: All Things New. Lake Mary, Florida: Bible Study Media, Inc. 2015. ISBN 978-1-942243-11-3
- The Spirit-Filled Life: All the Fullness of God. Lake Mary, Florida: Bible Study Media, Inc. 2015. ISBN 978-1-942243-14-4
- Draw Near: Hebrews on Christian Worship. Houston, Texas: Bible Study Media, Inc. 2019. ISBN 978-1-942243-26-7
- Trusting God: Redeeming Promises of the Word. Houston, Texas: Bible Study Media, Inc. 2021. ISBN 978-1-942243-45-8
- New Covenant and the Early Church. Houston, Texas: Bible Study Media, Inc. 2022. ISBN 978-1-942243-63-2
- Old Covenant and Ancient Israel. Houston, Texas: Bible Study Media, Inc. 2022. ISBN 978-1-942243-62-5
