= Trinity Parish (St. Augustine, Florida) =

Coordinates: 29.89223°N 81.31276°W

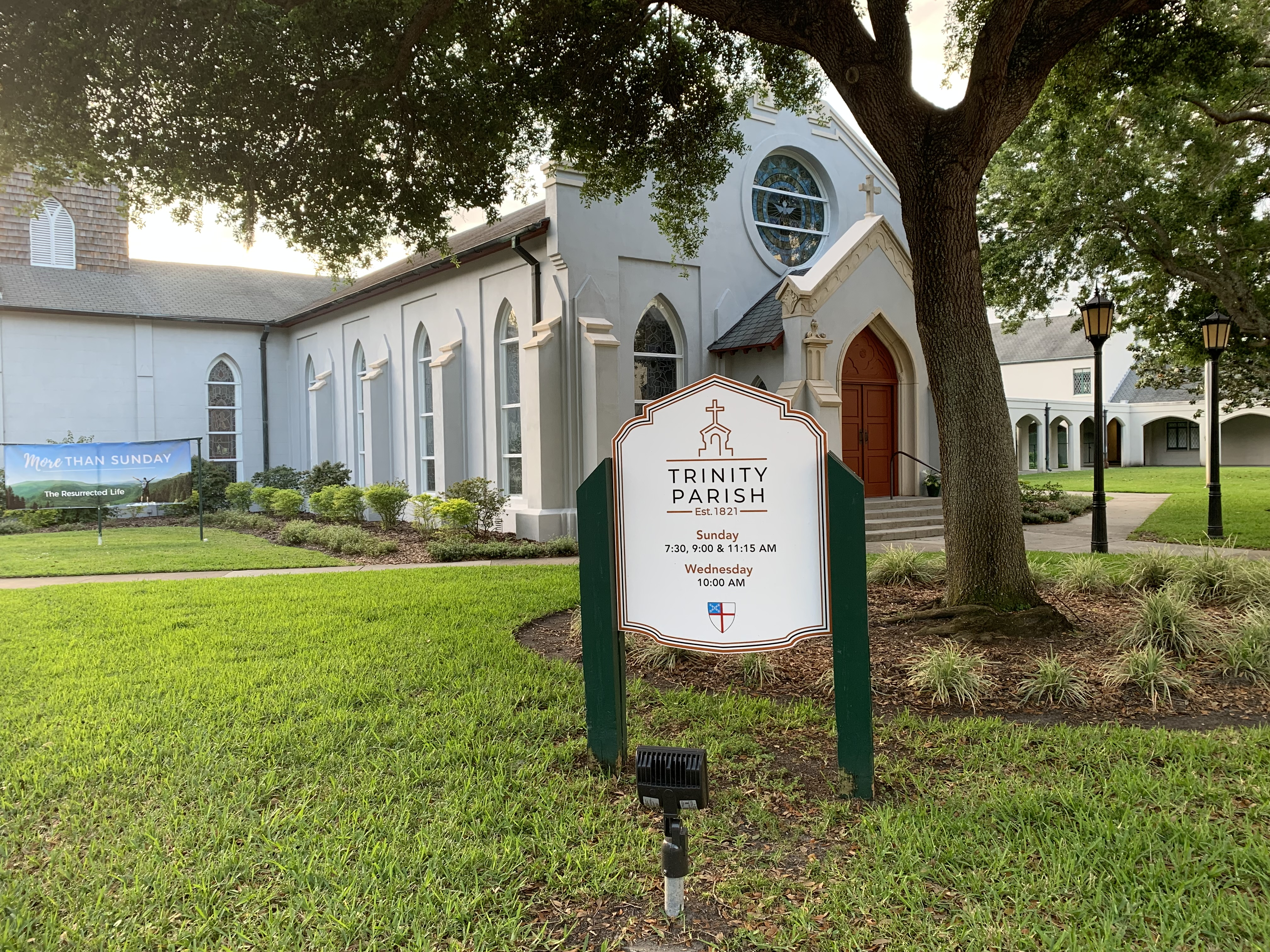
- Downtown Campus
- Trinity Parish
- Address: 215 St. George Street, St. Augustine, Florida, 32084
- Denomination: Episcopal
- Churchmanship: Traditional
- Website: www.trinitysta.org

History
- Founded: October 1821
- Dedication: Trinity Sunday

Administration
- Province: IV, Episcopal Church USA
- Diocese: Florida

Clergy
- Rector: Rev. Matt Marino

Trinity Parish is an historic Episcopal Church at the corner of King and St. George Street on the plaza in downtown St. Augustine, Florida. It is the oldest Protestant church in Florida. Trinity Parish opened a second campus in the Silver Leaf / World Golf area in summer of 2024. Trinity Parish seeks to welcome people to a life of grace, forgiveness and hope in Jesus Christ. As a traditional church, Trinity's vision is to see lives shaped through God's unchanging Word and the unbroken tradition.

== History ==
Trinity Church, St. Augustine was founded in 1821 soon after Florida became a United States territory. Trinity is one of the seven original parishes when the Episcopal Diocese of Florida was received into the General Convention in 1838.

The first church building was begun in 1830 and services began on June 30, 1831. Constructed of coquina, a local shell stone that was also used to build the Castillo de San Marcos, the original structure was 36 feet (11 m) wide by 50 feet (15 m) long. Bishop Nathaniel Bowen of South Carolina formally consecrated Trinity Church on June 5, 1834.

Growth was slow but steady in the years following and small additions and improvements were made to the church. Four stained glass windows were added just prior to the American Civil War. Although there was only one major battle in Florida, the war took a terrible toll on the state, the Diocese of Florida and Trinity.

The next 50 years saw a slow recovery by St. Augustine and Trinity, with continued work by a committed laity that raised funds to keep the church going through a succession of Rectors. The Rev. C M. Sturges arrived in 1895 and determined that the church building was outmoded and in dire need of repair. That began a six-year effort to obtain plans and funding to enlarge the church. Work began in early 1902 and on January 17, 1903, the first services were held in the “new” church, a cruciform structure, neo-Gothic in appearance that seated 300 parishioners.

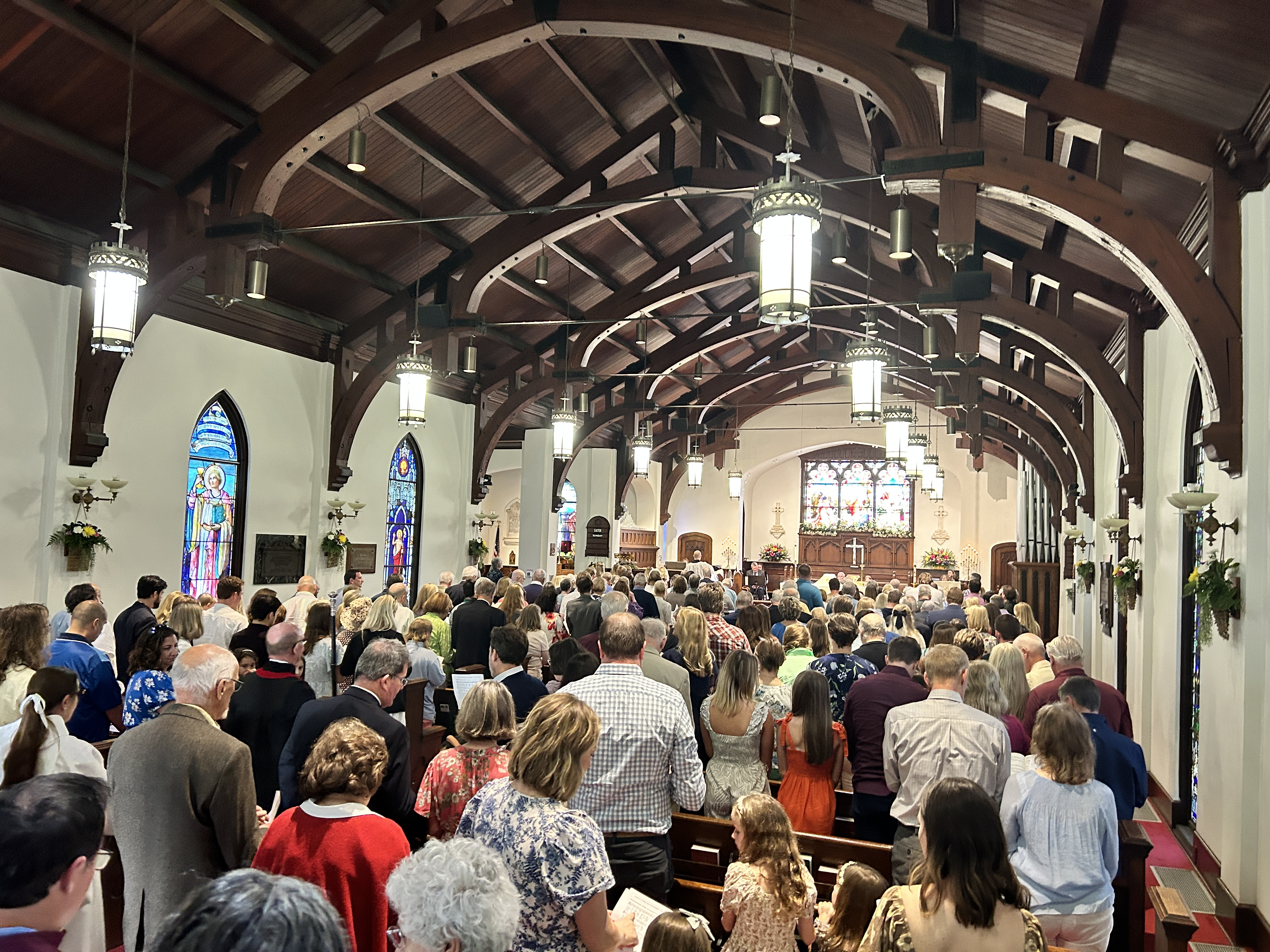
Worship in Downtown Campus

The 20th century brought profound changes to St. Augustine including a substantial increase in population and a steady rise in winter visitors – many of whom chose Trinity as their church. The Reverend L. Fitz-James Hindry served as Rector from 1904 until 1936. His tenure saw the formation of many lay organizations - altar guild, choir, acolytes, St. Catherine's guild and others – all devoted to serving the church's worship and work in the community.

The Rev. Charles Seymour was called to Trinity 1949 and served until 1964. The Seymour years were a time of significant physical changes to Trinity, including the acquisition of the parking lot and the construction of a two-story education facility in 1959 as the number of communicants had increased to more than 500. By 1960 Trinity Parish had grown from a relatively small church to a full complex with a new parish hall, kitchen, classrooms, administrative offices and a nursery. Architecturally, the new facilities and cloistered walkways complemented and continued the neo-gothic features of the historic church building.

The Rev. Canon Walter T. Saffran served as rector during the 1980s and into the 1990s and membership, which had declined significantly since 1964, again began to increase. When Father Saffran retired in 1997, he was named Rector Emeritus. Fr. David Weidner served Trinity from 2005 to 2018. The present Rector is the Rev. Matt Marino.

== Trinity Hall ==
In 1999 the Woolworths/Walgreens building adjacent to the church was purchased to serve the growing congregation and community. The new building was named Trinity Hall and is now the meeting and gathering place of many church activities, community meetings and as venue space. The building is 6,000 sq ft (560 m^{2}). with a capacity for 400 people.

== Stained glass ==
Windows began being placed in Trinity in 1859. Ten windows, including the Triptych above the altar were made by Franz Mayer & Co. of Munich, Germany. There is a Louis Comfort Tiffany window as well as windows made by Maitland, Armstrong, Rudy Bro, Henry Payne, Burnham, Colgate and Jacoby. Two windows were given as general thank offerings, twenty six are memorials to loved ones: wives, husbands, sons, other family members and rectors.

The original purpose of stained glass windows was to teach the great truths of the Christian faith. The windows of Trinity call to mind biblical figures and events. Jesus's life is chronicled from the Nativity through the Resurrection. The four Evangelists - Matthew, Mark, Luke and John - accenting the original entrance on King Street are the only windows designed to be viewed from outside the church. The round "Descending Dove" glass above the entrance complements the stained and painted traditional glass. Symbols of the Christian faith are found in all the windows; the dove, wheat and grapes, lilies and passion flowers, crosses, bibles, staffs and scripture citations from the Old and New Testaments.

Each of the twenty eight windows is different, but together they form a mosaic of color and sunlit beauty that accentuate the dignity and serenity of Trinity Parish. Between 1991 and 1992, Advent Glass Works conducted an inspection and appraisal, then performed total restoration of twenty-nine windows in the church. Due to the immense value of the windows, new protective glazing was installed.

== Organs ==
An organ constructed by New Yorker Henry Erben was assembled at Trinity in 1857. A three manual, 22-rank Austin Organ, model Opus 504, was placed in the church during 1914 in memory of Junius T. Smith. It was used for over 50 years until its deterioration from wood destroying organisms and water damage was beyond repair.

In 1965, the Vestry formed a committee to research the subject and make a recommendation. The Æeolian-Skinner Organ Company had provided instruments for many prominent institutions, including the Mormon Tabernacle in Salt Lake City and the Cathedral of St. John the Divine in New York City. The committee selected Aeolian-Skinner and a congregational vote confirmed their choice. The organ was ordered in mid-1966 and manufacture was completed a year later. The three manual organ of 41 ranks (2,349 pipes) was installed and dedicated prior to Thanksgiving in 1967.

John Parkyn was Trinity's organist when the Aeolian-Skinner organ was installed. Before 1996, he advised the vestry that the organ required considerable work. He created a renovation plan which included a thorough cleaning, console restoration and replacement or repair of a few groups of pipes. The process was executed over three years and rededicated in January 1999. The newest technology was incorporated which allows a computer to control the organ and digitally reproduce sounds from other notable organs. The Aeolian-Skinner organ still is a 3-manual, but it has 91-ranks instead of 41, making it an Opus 1482 hybrid pipe and digital organ. Instrumental sounds can be created that mimic flutes, oboes, trumpets, harps and chimes. John Parkyn, the Episcopal Diocese of Florida's longest serving organist and choir director, was named organist emeritus at Trinity Parish in 2025.

== Carillon ==
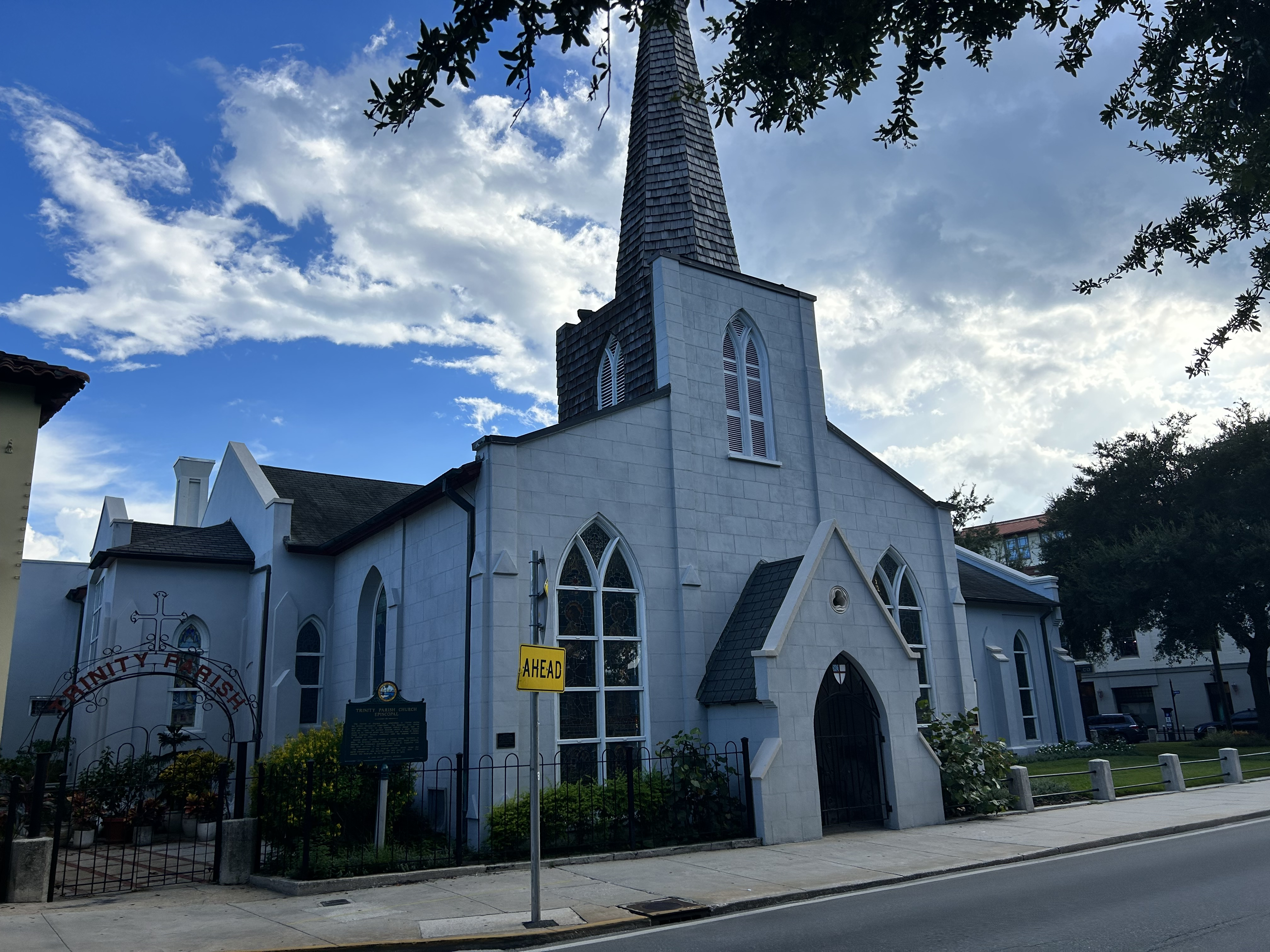
Original 1830 Trinity Parish

To celebrate the church's 150th anniversary in 1971, Helen Hindry Stephens donated the church's first carillon in her parents' memory. Louis Fitz-James Hindry was church rector for over three decades as well as being her father. Twenty-five years later, she repeated her gift. Helen Stephens died in 2001, and her family honored her memory in November 2003 by presenting the church with an automated carillon that plays songs on the quarter-hour during the day. At 12:30pm and 5pm, a 30-minute program commences.

== Notable people ==
- Anthony Comstock 1844-1915 Anti-vice activist, U.S. Postal Inspector
- Edmund J. Davis 1827-1883 Union General, Governor of Texas
- Dr. Mabel Elliott (1881–1968), Near East Relief Physician and Humanitarian
- Edmund Kirby Smith 1824-1893 Confederate General and professor of botany & mathematics
- William Wing Loring 1818-1886 American soldier, politician, fought for the U.S., Confederacy and the Khedivate of Egypt
- David Pendleton Oakerhater (1847–1931), Cheyenne warrior, artist, deacon and first Native American to be designated by the Episcopal Church as a saint
- Eleazer Root (1802–1887), rector of Trinity Parish (1874–1884) and educator
- Henry Benjamin Whipple 1822-1901 Episcopal bishop, humanitarian and advocate for Native Americans

== Brief history ==
-1764 – 1783: English period - Rev. Forbes leads St. Peters (1 block South on St. George St.)

-Oct. 7, 1821: Andrew Fowler arrives during yellow fever outbreak.

-1825: Trinity granted property on the plaza.

-1827: An Act of U.S. Congress gives land title to Trinity Parish in perpetuity.

-1830: Construction begins on church (today's north transept), services commence Trinity Sunday.

-1839: Diocese of Florida founded with 7 parishes. Turret, steeple and organ added.

-1842: Font, bell & gallery for black parishioners - paid for by S.C. black Episcopal churches.

-1850's: Henry Benjamin Whipple, later bishop to Minnesota, bishop to Native Americans and notorious for disarming a disgruntled parishioner from assassination of a preacher during the sermon, does interim work for Trinity and plants St. Mark's, Palatka.

-1859: First four stained glass windows.

-1860: All three Civil War generals born in St. Augustine (Edmund Kirby-Smith, Edmund J. Davis, and William Wing Loring), were baptized at Trinity.

-1862: During Union occupation, the Rector is escorted to the city gates for praying for the President of the Confederacy. Church is kept open by future anti-vice crusader, Anthony Comstock.

-1876: Cheyenne Warriors imprisoned at Ft. Marion. David Pendleton Oakerhater, 1st Native American commemorated in the Episcopal Church, is converted by ladies from Trinity.

-1893: During Jim Crow, Trinity is segregated by building St. Cyprian's in Lincolnville.

-1895: After “Bad remodel”, Bishop Weed directs new church be built.

-1903: “New Church” dedicated.

-1904: Longest serving rector, Louis Fitz-James Hindry begins his 33-year ministry.

-1945: Rev. Charles Schilling resigns to become military chaplain. He goes ashore on D-Day and is awarded the Silver Star.

-1949: Rev. Charles Seymour begins 15-year growth phase - 1959 “Seymour Addition” built.

-1964: Fr. Seymour is only white pastor in St. Augustine to seat African Americans, prematurely ending his tenure. Civil Rights Act is passed from events in St. Augustine.

-1974: Jr. warden accused in the “Bloody Sunset” murder of Athalia Ponsell Lindsley - dividing Trinity.

-1989: Rev. Walter Saffran “saves Trinity” - reversing two decades of declining attendance.

-1999: Acquisition of “Trinity Square” - Today's Fellowship Hall and income property that funds ministry.

-2005: Rev. David Weidner brings renewal and financial stability.

-2019: Current rector, Rev. Matt Marino is called to Trinity.

-2020: Rev. Curt Benham is called with the plan of planting a second campus.

-2021: Bicentennial and acquisition of land in SilverLeaf (NW St. John's County) for a second campus.

-2023: Rev. Jim Huster and Rev. Caleb Jones are ordained at Trinity.

-2024: Sept 6: North Campus church and preschool launched.

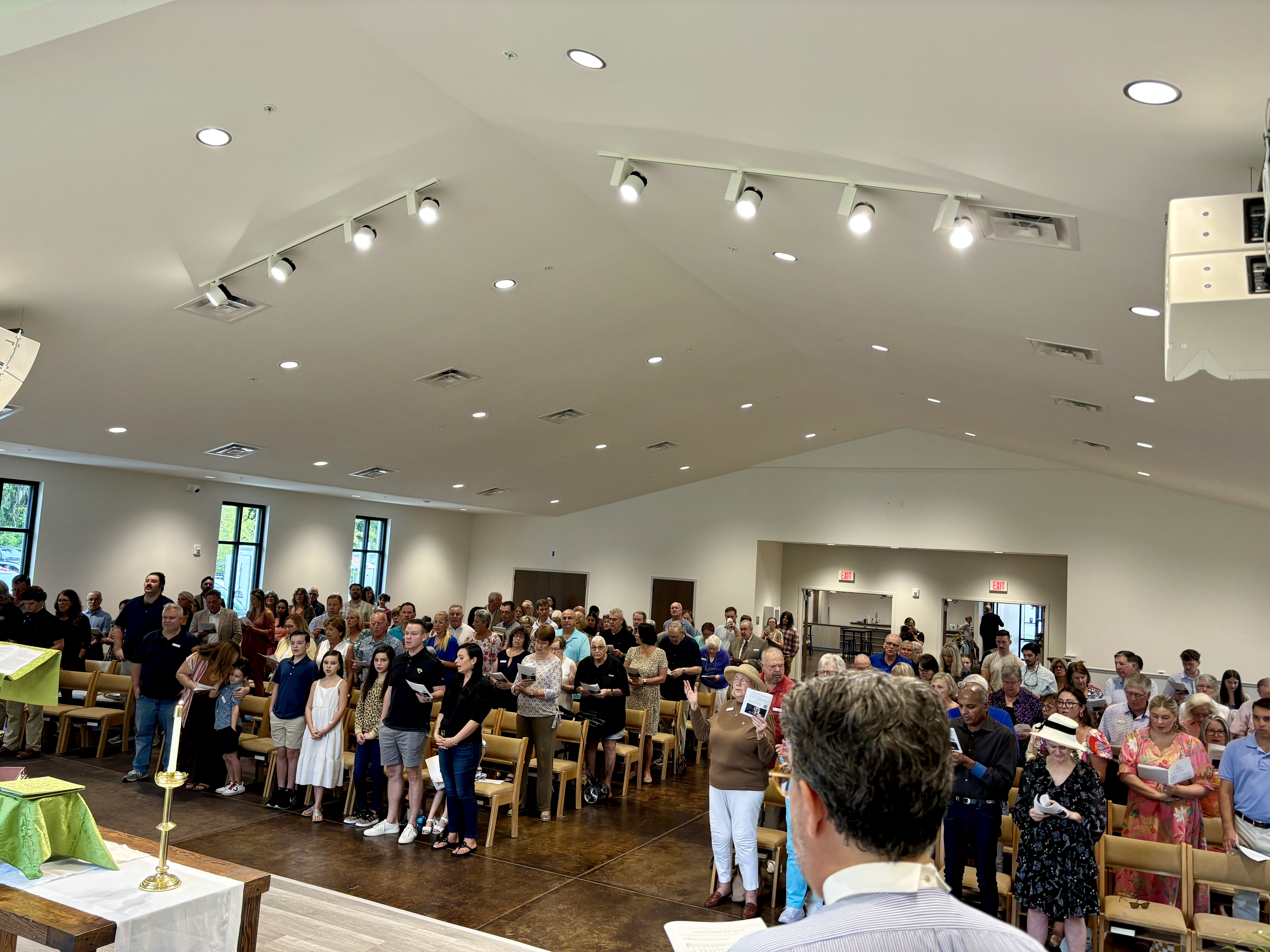
Worship in SilverLeaf Campus

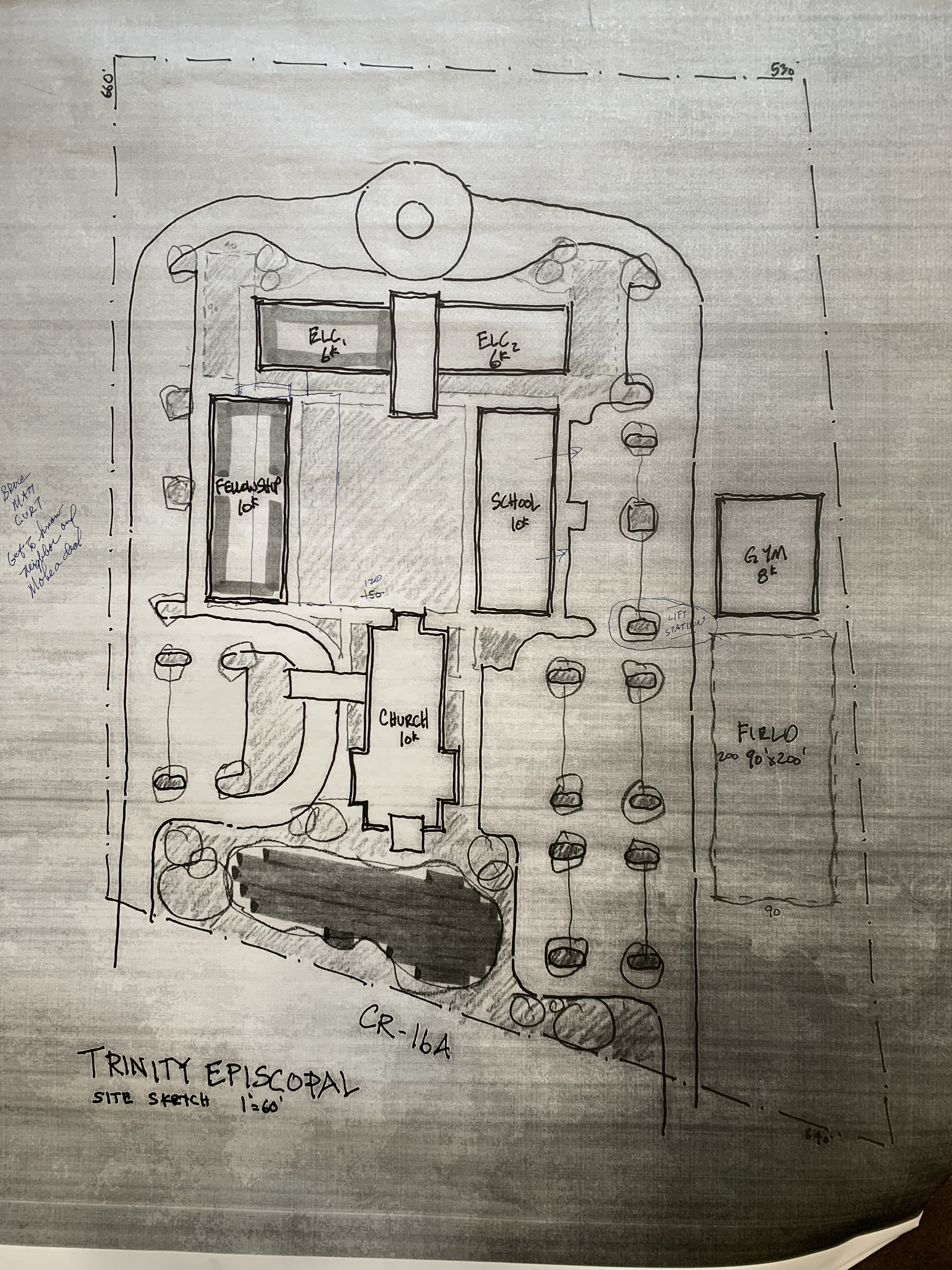
SilverLeaf Master Plan
