= Charles A. Holt =

American economist

Charles A. Holt (born October 2, 1948) is a behavioral economist and the A. Willis Robertson Professor of Political Economy at the University of Virginia. He has written books and articles on topics in experimental economics and game theory, and was a founding co-editor of the journal, Experimental Economics. He has previously served as President of the Economic Science Association, the Southern Economic Association, and the Society of Economic Educators. His research on auction design includes projects for greenhouse gas allowances (Regional Greenhouse Gas Initiative), spectrum licenses (FCC Hierarchical Package Bidding), and diverse financial assets (NY Federal Reserve Bank). Other work includes measures of risk aversion and subjective beliefs, and studies of strategic behavior, using a mix of game theory and experiment. He has four books with Princeton University Press: The Economic Experience: An Introduction through Experiments (with Erica Sprott), 2025; Markets, Games, and Strategic Behavior, 2019; Quantal Response Equilibrium: A Stochastic Theory of Games, (with Jacob Goeree and Tom Palfrey), 2016; and Experimental Economics (with Doug Davis), 2003. In addition, Origins and Evolution of Experimental Economics was published by Edward Elgar in 2026. His current coauthored book project is: Rebels WITH a Cause: Philosophical Laureates in the Economic Sciences, (under review). He has also published widely in economics journals, and in top finance, political science and economic education journals. He is the director of the Veconlab and does the web-based programming for the freely available class experiment site (https://veconlab.com), which has about 15,000 student logins each month He is a newly appointed Fellow in the Econometric Society and is the recipient of the Thomas Jefferson Award for scholarship (University of Virginia), the Kenneth Elzinga Award for Teaching, and the inaugural 2023 American Economic Association Distinguished Economic Education Award.

His website can be found here.

== Selected Books ==
- Origins and Evolution of Experimental Economics, Edward Elgar, (85,000 word research narrative), in press, forthcoming 2026.
- The Economic Experience: An Introduction Through Experiments, Charles A. Holt and Erica R. Sprott, Princeton University Press, (lab-based textbook) July 2025.
- Markets, Games, and Strategic Behavior: An Introduction to Experimental Economics, Princeton University Press, 2019, second edition.
- Quantal Response Equilibrium: A Stochastic Theory of Games, Jacob Goeree, Charles Holt, and Thomas Palfrey, Princeton: Princeton University Press, 2016.
- Experimental Economics, Douglas D. Davis and Charles A. Holt, Princeton University Press, 1993.
- “Bidding for Contracts,” in Bayesian Analysis in Economic Theory and Time Series Analysis, the 1977 Savage Dissertation Award Theses (with R. W. Shore), A. Zellner and J. B. Kadane (eds.), North-Holland, 1980.

== Selected Publications ==
- “The Allais Paradox and Upside-Downside Risk Preference: An Analysis with Probability Weighting and Chernoff Faces,” Irene Comeig and Charles A. Holt (forthcoming 2026) Southern Economic Journal.
- “Can Discount Window Stigma be Cured? An Experimental Investigation,” Olivier Armantier and Charles A. Holt, forthcoming 2026 in The Review of Financial Studies.
- “Missing the Margin: Behavioral Biases in Incremental Decision Making,” (forthcoming 2026) with Madeleine Green, Juliette Sellgren, and Erica Sprott, Review of Behavioral Economics.
- “Inventory Management with Carryover in a Laboratory Setting: Going Beyond the Newsvendor Paradigm,” (forthcoming 2026), with Béatrice Boulu-Reshef, Experimental Economics.
- “Rent Dissipation and Streamlined Costs: Laboratory Experiments,” (2026) with Angela Smith, Games and Economic Behavior, 157: 379-394.
- “Binary Conflict: An Experimental Study of Strategic Effectiveness and Equilibrium,” (2024) Charles Holt and Thomas Palfrey, American Journal of Political Science, 68(4), 1431-1446.
- “Permutation Tests for Experimental Data” (2023) Charles A. Holt and Sean P. Sullivan, Experimental Economics, 26: 775-812.
- “Endogenous Reference Price Auctions for a Diverse Set of Commodities: An Experimental Analysis” (2023) Olivier Armantier and Charles Holt, Experimental Economics, 30:1-27,
- “Price-Responsive Allowance Supply in Emissions Markets,” Dallas Burtraw, Charles Holt, Karen Palmer, and Bill Shobe, Journal of the Association of Environmental and Resource Economists, volume 9, number 5, September 2022, 851-884.
- “An Experimental Analysis of Risk Effects in Attacker-Defender Games,” Charles A. Holt, Ricky Sahu, and Angela M. Smith, Southern Economic Journal, 2022, 89: 185-315, recipient of the 2023 Georgeseu-Roegen Prize for the best paper (runner up) in the Southern Economic Journal.
- “Upside Versus Downside Risk: Gender, Stakes, and Skewness,” Irene Comeig, Charles Holt, and Ainhoa Jaramillo-Gutiérrez, Journal of Economic Behavior and Organization, 2022, 200: 21-30.
- “Capital Constraints and Asset Bubbles,” (with Lee Coppock and Daniel Harper), Journal of Economic Behavior and Organization, 2021, 183, 75-88.
- “Overcoming Discount Window Stigma: An Experimental Investigation,” (with Olivier Armantier), Review of Financial Studies. 2020, 12, 5630–5659,
- “Assisted Savings for Retirement: An Experimental Analysis” (with Clement Bohr and Alexandra Schubert), European Economic Review, 2019, 119, 42-54.
- “Price Bubbles, Gender, and Expectations in Experimental Asset Markets,” (with Megan Porzio and Michelle Song) European Economic Review, 2017, 100, 72-94.
- “An Experimental Examination of the Volunteer’s Dilemma” (with Angela Smith and Jacob Goeree), Games and Economic Behavior, 2017, 102(C), 305–315.
- “Belief Elicitation with a Simple Lottery Choice Menu: Invariant to Risk Preferences,” (with Angela Smith) American Economic Journal: Microeconomics, 8(1), February 2016, 110-139.
- “The Paradox of Misaligned Profiling: Theory and Experimental Evidence,” (with Andrew Kydd, Laura Razzolini, and Roman Sheremeta), 2016, Journal of Conflict Resolution, 60(3), 482-500.
- “A Procurement Auction for Toxic Assets with Asymmetric Information,” (with O. Armantier and C. Plott) American Economic Journal: Microeconomics, 5(4), 2013, 142-162.
- “Hierarchical Package Bidding: A Paper & Pencil Combinatorial Auction,” (with J. Goeree) Games and Economic Behavior, 70, September 2010, 146-169.
- “An Experimental Study of Auctions versus Grandfathering to Assign Pollution Permits,” (with Goeree, J., W. Shobe, K. Palmer, and D. Burtraw) Journal of the European Economic Association, 2010, April/May, Vol. 8, No. 2-3, Pages 514-525
- “An Experimental Test of Flexible Combinatorial Spectrum Auction Formats,” (with C. Brunner, J. Goeree, J. Ledyard), American Economic Journal: Micro, 2010 (2) 39-57.
- “The Newsvendor Pull-to-Center Effect: Adaptive Learning in a Laboratory Experiment,” (with Angela Smith and AJ Bostian) Manufacturing and Service Operations Management, 2008, Fall 10(4), 590-608.
- “Regular Quantal Response Equilibrium,” (with Jacob Goeree and Tom Palfrey) Experimental Economics, 2006, 8, 347-367.
- “An Exploration of Anomalous Behavior in Models of Political Participation,” (with J. Goeree), American Political Science Review, May 2005, 99(2), 201-213.
- “Risk Aversion and Incentives: New Data without Order Effects,” (with Susan Laury) American Economic Review, June 2005, 95(3), 902-912.
- “An Experimental Study of Costly Coordination” (with J. Goeree) Games and Economic Behavior, 2005 (2), 349-364.
- “Noisy Directional Learning and the Logit Equilibrium,” (with Simon Anderson and Jacob Goeree), Scandinavian Journal of Economics, (106) September 2004, 581-602.
- “The Nash Equilibrium: A Perspective” (with Al Roth) Proceedings of the National Academy of Sciences, USA, March 2004, 101(12) pp. 3999-4002.
- “A Model of Noisy Introspection” (with Jacob Goeree), Games and Economic Behavior, 2004, 46(2), 281-294.
- “Economic Science: An Experimental Approach for Teaching and Research,” Presidential Address, Southern Economic Journal, April 2003, 69(4), 755-771.
- “Risk Aversion and Incentive Effects” (with Susan Laury) American Economic Review, December 2002, 92: 1644-55.
- “Quantal Response Equilibrium and Overbidding in Private Value Auctions” (with Jacob Goeree and Thomas Palfrey), Journal of Economic Theory, 104(1), 2002, 247-272.
- “Learning and Noisy Equilibrium Behavior in an Experimental Study of Imperfect Price Competition,” (with M. Capra, R. Gomez, and J. Goeree), International Economic Review, August 2002, 613-636.
- “Private Costs and Public Benefits: Unraveling the Effects of Altruism and Noisy Behavior,” (with Jacob Goeree and Susan Laury), Journal of Public Economics, 83(2) 2002, 257-278.
- “The Logit Equilibrium: A Unified Perspective on Intuitive Behavioral Anomalies in Games with Rank-Based Payoffs,” (with Simon Anderson and Jacob Goeree), Southern Economic Journal, July 2002, 21-47.
- “Ten Little Treasures of Game Theory and Ten Intuitive Contradictions,” (with Jacob Goeree) American Economic Review, December 2001, 1402-1422.
- “Minimum-Effort Coordination Games: An Equilibrium Analysis of Bounded Rationality,” (with Simon Anderson and Jacob Goeree), Games and Economic Behavior, 34(2), 2001, 177-199.
- “Asymmetric Inequality Aversion and Noisy Behavior in Alternating-Offer Bargaining Games” (with Jacob Goeree) European Economic Review, 44, 2000, 1079-1089.
- “Stochastic Game Theory: For Playing Games, Not Just for Doing Theory,” (with Jacob Goeree) Proceedings of the National Academy of Sciences, 96, September 1999, 10564-10567.
- “Anomalous Behavior in a Traveler's Dilemma?” (with M. Capra, J. Goeree, and R. Gomez) American Economic Review, 89:3, June 1999, 678-690.
- “Information Cascades in the Laboratory,” (with Lisa Anderson) American Economic Review, December 1997, 847-862.
- “The Loser's Curse” (with R. Sherman), American Economic Review, 84(3), June 1994, 642-652.
- “Equilibrium Cooperation in Three-Person, Choice-of-Partner Games” (with D. Davis), Games and Economic Behavior, 7, 1994, 39-53.
- “An Experimental Test of Equilibrium Dominance in Signaling Games” (with Jordi Brandts), American Economic Review, 82(5), December 1992, 1350-1365.
- “Strategic Voting Behavior in Agenda-Controlled Committee Experiments” (with C. Eckel), American Economic Review, 79(4), September 1989, 763-773.
- “The Exercise of Market Power in Laboratory Experiments” Journal of Law & Economics, (32, 2, pt.2) October 1989, S107-S131.
- “Facilitating Practices: The Effects of Advance Notice and Best-Price Policies” (with David Scheffman), RAND Journal of Economics, 18(2), Summer 1987, 187-197.
- “Preference Reversals and the Independence Axiom” American Economic Review, 76(3), June 1986, 508-515.
- “An Experimental Test of the Consistent-Conjectures Hypothesis” American Economic Review, 75(3), June 1985, 314-325.
- “Waiting-Line Auctions” (with R. Sherman), Journal of Political Economy, 90(2), April 1982, 280-292.
- “Competitive Bidding for Contracts under Alternative Auction Procedures” Journal of Political Economy, 88(3), June 1980, 433-445.
- “Capital Allocation within a Firm” (with R. M. Cyert and M. H. DeGroot), Behavioral Science, 24(5), September 1979, 287-295.
- “Uncertainty and the Bidding for Incentive Contracts” American Economic Review, 69(4), September 1979, 697-705.
