= John Howard (bishop) =

Former American bishop

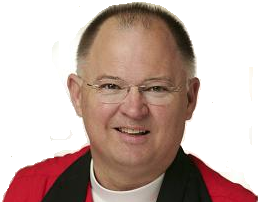
- Church: Episcopal Church
- Diocese: Florida
- Elected: May 16, 2003
- In office: 2003–2023
- Predecessor: Stephen H. Jecko
- Previous post: Former Bishop oF Florida (2023-2025) Bishop of Florida (2004-2023) Coadjutor Bishop of Florida (2003-2004)

Orders
- Ordination: 1990
- Consecration: November 1, 2003 by Charles Jenkins
- Laicized: October 2025

Personal details
- Born: Samuel Johnson Howard; September 8, 1951 (age 74) North Carolina, United States
- Denomination: Protestant Episcopal Church in the United States of America
- Spouse: Martha Marie
- Children: 2

Samuel Johnson "John" Howard (born September 8, 1951) was the eighth bishop of the Diocese of Florida in the U.S. Episcopal Church. Howard was elected bishop coadjutor on May 16, 2003, and entered office on January 29, 2004. He retired on October 31, 2023. He was released from ordained ministry in the Episcopal Church in 2025.

== Early career ==
Howard was born on September 8, 1951 in North Carolina. He is a 1973 graduate of Williams College in Williamstown, Massachusetts, and has been married to his wife, Martha Marie, since 1974. They have two grown sons, Augustus and Charles.

Howard graduated from the Wake Forest University School of Law in Winston-Salem, North Carolina, in 1976. He practiced law in Raleigh, North Carolina, from 1976 to 1986. He also worked on the staff of the Commerce Committee of the United States Senate.

== Religious career ==
Howard changed his career by returning to school and graduating from Virginia Theological Seminary in Alexandria, Virginia, with a Master of Divinity degree. He was ordained as a deacon in June 1989 and a year later was ordained as a priest. His first position was assistant to the rector of the Church of the Holy Comforter in Charlotte, North Carolina, then rector of St. James' Episcopal Church in Charleston, South Carolina.

Howard served as vicar of Trinity Church Wall Street from December 1997 until going to Florida in 2003.

Howard served as Bishop of Florida until his retirement in October 2023.

== Disciplinary Proceedings and Removal from Ordained Ministry ==
Following his retirement in 2023, Howard became the subject of two disciplinary proceedings under Title IV of the Episcopal Church's disciplinary canons. One case alleged that, during his episcopate, the Diocese of Florida engaged in a pattern of discrimination against LGBTQ+ clergy, candidates for ordination, and their supporters. A separate case alleged financial improprieties involving diocesan administration. Howard acknowledged many of the underlying factual circumstances in his 2024 response but denied any wrongdoing. The cases were scheduled for disciplinary hearings in late 2025, though church officials reported that Howard had become largely unresponsive to the disciplinary process during that year.

In October 2025, Presiding Bishop Sean Rowe announced that the Episcopal Church had reached an accord with Howard ending both disciplinary cases without a hearing, disciplinary sanctions, or an admission of wrongdoing. Rowe stated that continuing the proceedings would have imposed significant financial costs on the church and further impeded the Diocese of Florida's recovery from years of internal conflict. Rowe also publicly apologized to LGBTQ+ Episcopalians and others whom he said had been harmed by Howard's ministry, stating that Howard's leadership had "caused deep pain for many." Independently of the accord, Howard requested and was granted release and removal from ordained ministry in the Episcopal Church.

== See also ==
- List of Episcopal bishops of the United States
- Historical list of the Episcopal bishops of the United States
