= Charles B. Holt House =

Historic house in Virginia, United States

- U.S. National Register of Historic Places
- Virginia Landmarks Register
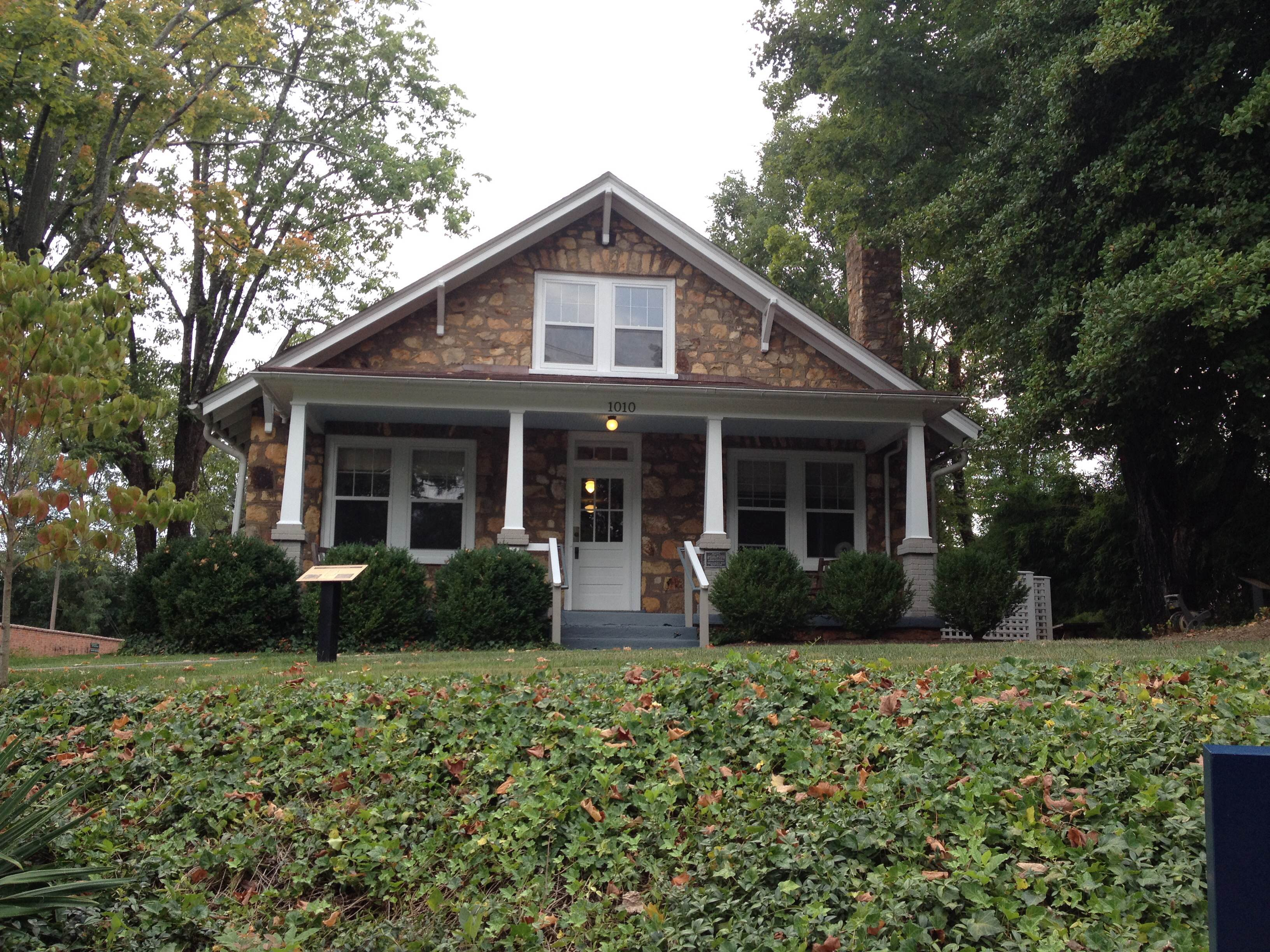

- Location within Virginia Location within the United States
- Location: 1010 Preston Ave., Charlottesville, Virginia
- Coordinates: 38°2′30″N 78°29′32″W
- Built: 1926
- Architectural style: Bungalow/Craftsman
- NRHP reference No.: 06000320
- VLR No.: 104-5098

Significant dates
- Added to NRHP: April 14, 2006
- Designated VLR: March 8, 2006

The Charles B. Holt House is a rock house in Charlottesville, Virginia, United States. It was built by Charles B. Holt, with construction completed in 1926. Holt was a locksmith, furniture repairman, and carpenter. Holt and his wife Mary lived in the house until their deaths, at which time their son, Leroy Preston, and his wife, Asalie Minor Preston, moved in. Asalie was a prominent teacher all her life, and endowed the Minor-Preston Educational Fund.

The rock house still stands today, and is a reminder of the many contributions of African-Americans like Holt and the Prestons. The interior of the house has noticeably deteriorated but the owner of the building, The Legal Aid Justice Center, has agreed to preserve and restore the house. The stone house is surrounded in part by a stone wall, and the porch features columns. The house is said to have six rooms and a bath downstairs, four rooms and a bath upstairs, and a large basement. Holt's name is carved into the front steps. The house is located at 1010 Preston Avenue across from Washington Park in Charlottesville, Virginia.
