= Episcopal School of Jacksonville =

Prep school in Jacksonville, Florida, US

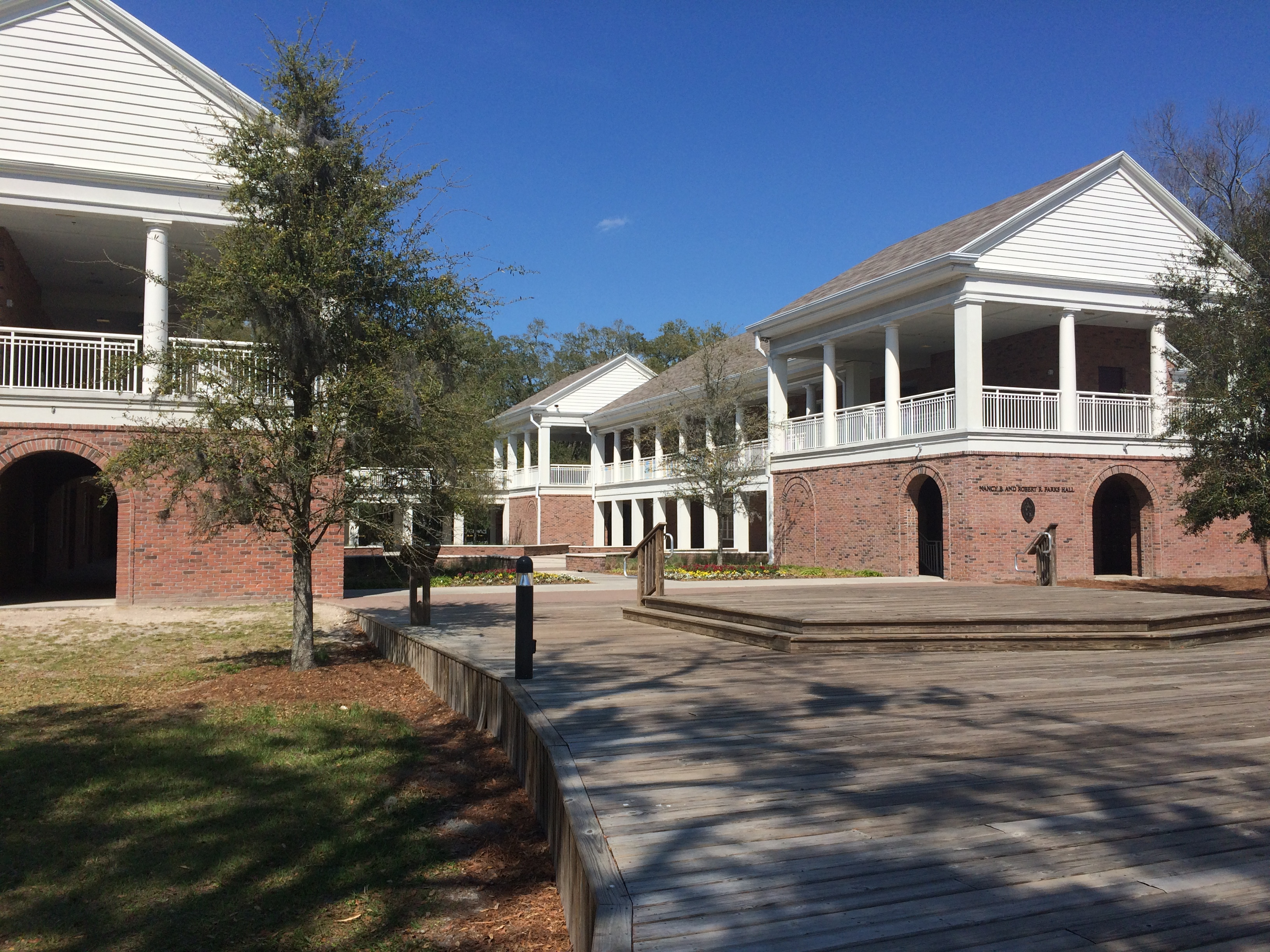

Location
- 4455 Atlantic Boulevard; Jacksonville, Florida 32207-2197; USA; 30°18′39″N 81°37′18″W

Information
- Type: Private, Coeducational
- Established: 1966
- Status: Open
- Staff: 60
- Faculty: 82
- Grades: PreK-3 - Sixth grade; Age 1 - Sixth grade; 6 - 12
- Enrollment: 995
- Campus: Suburban, Munnerlyn Campus; Suburban, Beaches Campus; Suburban, St. Mark's Campus
- Campus size: 56 acres (0.23 km^{2})
- Colors: Maroon and Gold
- Mascot: Eagle
- '25-'26 Tuition: $33,750 (Upper School) $32,600 (Middle School)
- Website: http://www.esj.org

Episcopal School of Jacksonville is an independent, coeducational private college preparatory school in Jacksonville, Florida, United States. It was founded in 1966 by the Episcopal Diocese of Florida. The school has two lower schools, a middle school and a high school and enrolls about 1,200 students a year.

== History ==
St. John's Cathedral Parishioner Mary Packer-Cummings, who died in 1912, willed 28 acres (110,000 m^{2}) of land to St. John's Cathedral. The Episcopal Diocese of Florida operated a boys' home on the site from 1921, but this closed in 1953 due to financial problems. At that time, the church began to plan to establish a private high school.

Jacksonville Episcopal High School opened on September 4, 1967. The name was changed to Episcopal High School of Jacksonville in 1987, and to Episcopal School of Jacksonville in 2011, reflecting its expansion of grades served.

Today, the school has three campuses, including two lower school campuses (St. Mark's and Beaches Campuses), a middle school and a high school (Munnerlyn Campus), serving students from age 1 through grade 12. A couple of miles away along the banks of the Arlington River is the Episcopal's Knight Sports Campus. USTA tennis courts, a boathouse, lacrosse fields, a cross country trail and field house are on the Knight Campus. Despite its affiliation with the Episcopal church and its Christian mission, the school admits students of any religion, ethnic background, and nationality.

The school is governed by a board of trustees, which is approved by the Executive Counsel the Episcopal Diocese of Florida. The board is responsible for establishing school policy, managing assets, and selecting a head of school. The dean of St. John's Cathedral is vice-chair and the clergy member of the board.

The overall student to teacher ratio is 10:1, with the average class size at around 17. Episcopal offers 23 AP courses. In 2009, 91 students (11%) made a perfect score of 5 on an AP exam. Of Episcopal's 90 faculty members, 94% have 4-year degrees or higher, 31% have graduate degrees, and 1% have a Ph.D. The average tenure is almost 20 years. A major achievement for the school is its 100% college placement rate.

Episcopal was the site of a school shooting on March 6, 2012. Shane Schumerth, who had been fired from his job as a Spanish teacher, shot and killed Dale Regan, head of school, before committing suicide. Schumerth, who had been struggling with depression, was fired that morning; he returned to the campus at 1:15 p.m. with an AK-47 assault rifle concealed in a guitar case. He entered Regan's office and shot her several times before shooting himself. In 2013, the school dedicated the Regan Plaza at the Great Oak in Dale Regan's memory.

== Notable alumni ==
- David Duval, professional golfer
- Bill Forrester, Bronze medalist swimmer in the 200 meter butterfly at the 1976 Summer Olympics
- Tyrone Gayle, spokesman for Hillary Clinton, Tim Kaine and Kamala Harris
- Nancy Hogshead-Makar, swimmer at the 1984 Summer Olympics
- Hampton Catlin, Inventor of Sass and Haml
- Garrett Scantling, track and field athlete and olympian, 2026 US Decathlon Champion
- Charlie Hunt, Arena Football League player
- Jorge Oliver, swimmer for Puerto Rico in the men's 200 m individual medley at the 2004 Summer Olympics
- Sha'reff Rashad, former football player
