= St. John's Cathedral (Jacksonville) =

Coordinates: 30.328772°N 81.653423°W

- The Cathedral Church of Saint John the Evangelist
- St. John's Cathedral
- Location: Jacksonville, Florida
- Country: United States
- Denomination: Episcopal Church
- Website: St. John’s Cathedral, Jacksonville website

History
- Dedication: John the Evangelist

Architecture
- Architect: Howard Nott Potter
- Style: Neo-Gothic
- Completed: 1906

Administration
- Province: IV
- Diocese: Florida

Clergy
- Bishop: [[]]
- Dean: Kate Moorehead Carroll

St. John's Cathedral is a cathedral of the Episcopal Church in Jacksonville, Florida, U.S. One of the oldest congregations in Jacksonville, it became the seat of the Bishop of the Episcopal Diocese of Florida in 1951. The building dates to 1906.

== History ==
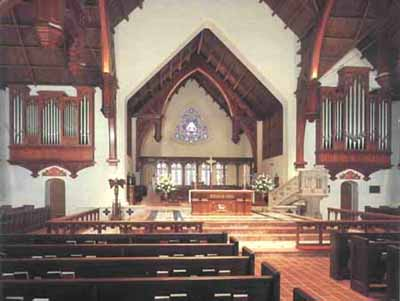
Cathedral interior

The congregation was founded in 1834 as St. John's Parish. It is one of the seven original parishes dating to the reception of the Diocese of Florida into the Episcopal General Convention in 1838. According to the cornerstone for the present Cathedral, the first St. John's Church was built in 1842 and burned in 1862 during the American Civil War. In the early 1870s, Edward Tuckerman Potter designed a new St. John's and initial construction began in 1873. The church was completed and dedicated in 1877. This building burned in the Great Fire of 1901, which destroyed most of Downtown Jacksonville, and the next year a new church was designed by Howard Nott Potter of the firm Snelling and Potter. St. John's Cathedral was completed and consecrated in 1906.

St. John's is the only cathedral in Jacksonville. Inside the building is cavernous; built in the Gothic Revival architectural style, stained-glass windows line the walls. In 1983, Advent Glass Works restored or repaired all stained glass in the cathedral, the cloister and the Cummings Chapel.

== School ==
The St. John's Cathedral School is sponsored by the cathedral and diocese and includes infants to Pre-K 4.

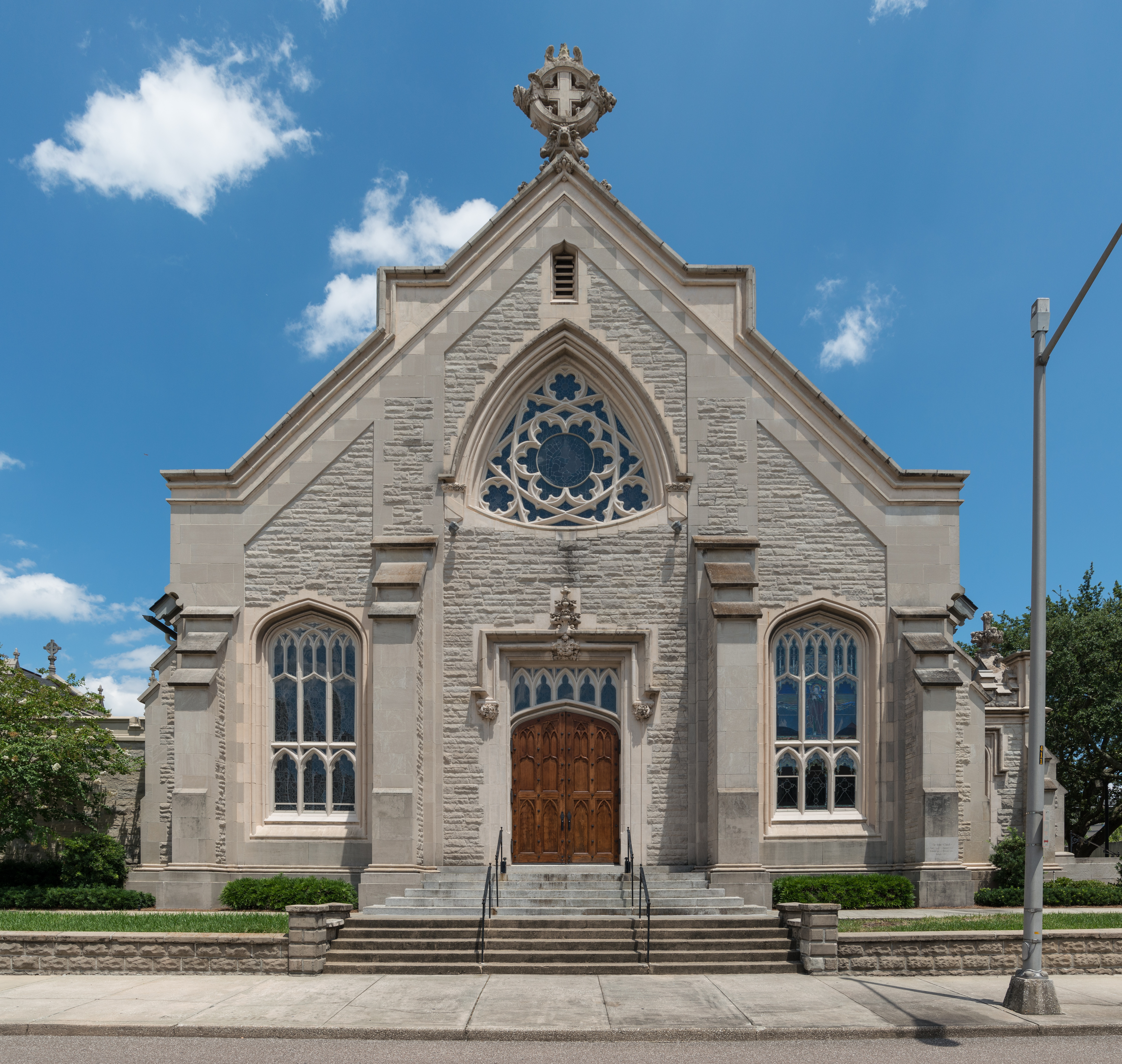
Front view

== See also ==
- List of the Episcopal cathedrals of the United States
- List of cathedrals in Florida
- Episcopal School of Jacksonville
