= St. John's Episcopal Church (Tallahassee, Florida) =

Historic church in Florida, United States

- U.S. National Register of Historic Places
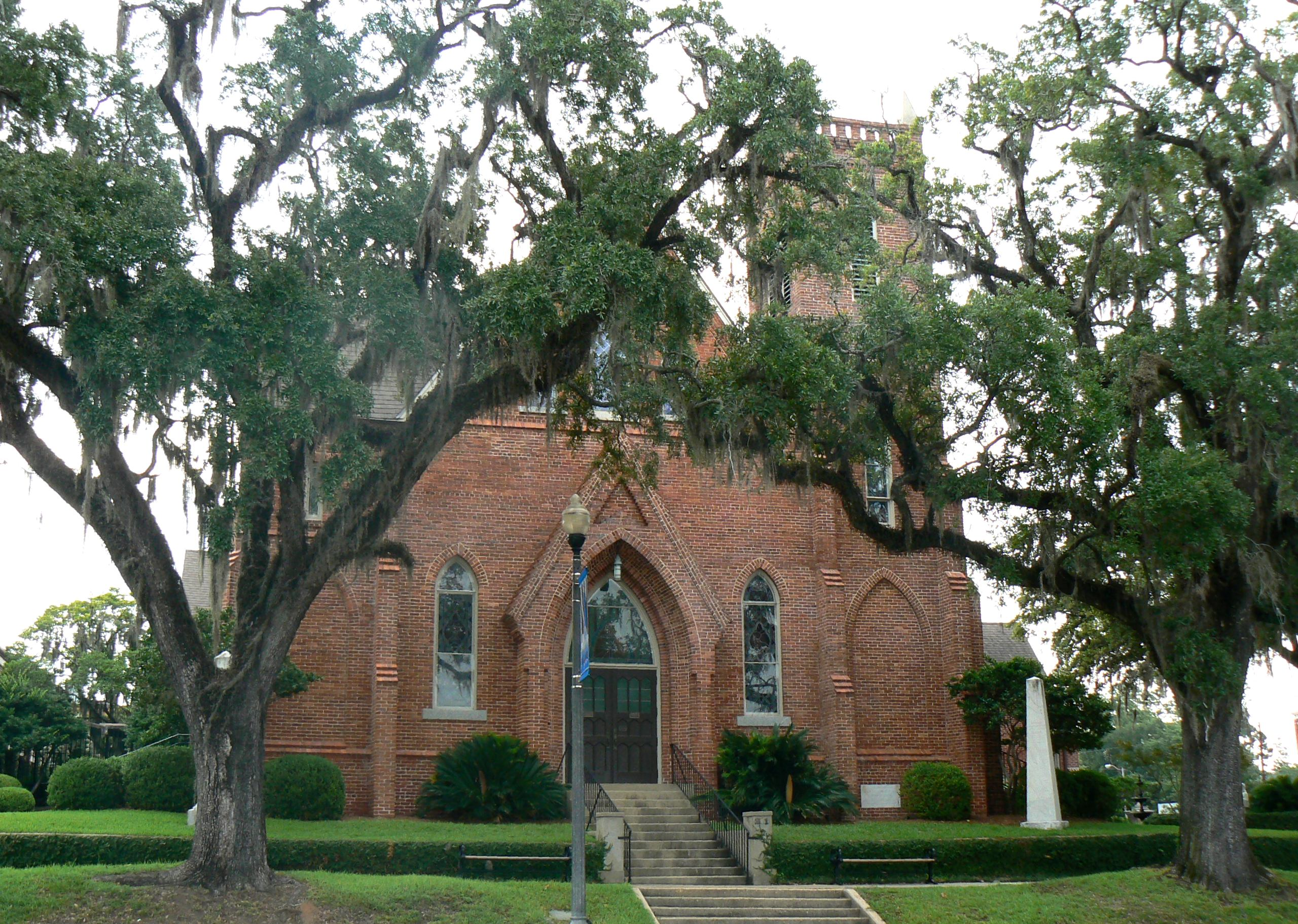
- St. John's Episcopal Church

- Location within Florida Location within the United States
- Location: 211 N. Monroe St., Tallahassee, Florida
- Coordinates: 30°26′37″N 84°16′49″W
- Built: 1881
- Architectural style: Late Gothic Revival
- Website: https://www.saint-john.org/
- NRHP reference No.: 78000951
- Added to NRHP: August 10, 1978

St. John's Episcopal Church is an historic church in Tallahassee, Florida. It is located at 211 North Monroe Street. On August 10, 1978, it was added to the U.S. National Register of Historic Places.

The church body was first constituted in 1829. Services were held in the old Leon County court house on Monroe Street from 1829 to 1837. From 1837 to 1879 services were held in first church building at the same site. This building was consecrated in 1838, but eventually burned down in 1879. Services resumed in the court house, which also eventually burned down, and then in the capitol building, during the erection of present Gothic style, red brick church, erected in 1880 and dedicated in 1888. This building still stands, with art glass and memorial glass windows, pipe organ, bronze memorial tablet, altar service, bronze memorial tablet, altar service, carved lectern, prie-dieu, carillon. The church owns its rectory.
