= John Schneider Jr. =

American politician (1918–1985)

John Schneider Jr. (August 20, 1918 in Sheboygan, Wisconsin – July 6, 1985) was an American politician. He was a member of the Wisconsin State Assembly.

== Career ==
Schneider was a member of the Assembly from 1945 to 1950. He was also a delegate to the 1948 Democratic National Convention.

Party political offices
Preceded by Eugene M. Lamb	Democratic nominee for Treasurer of Wisconsin; 1962	Succeeded by Eugene M. Lamb
