= 1938 Wisconsin gubernatorial election =

- November 8, 1938
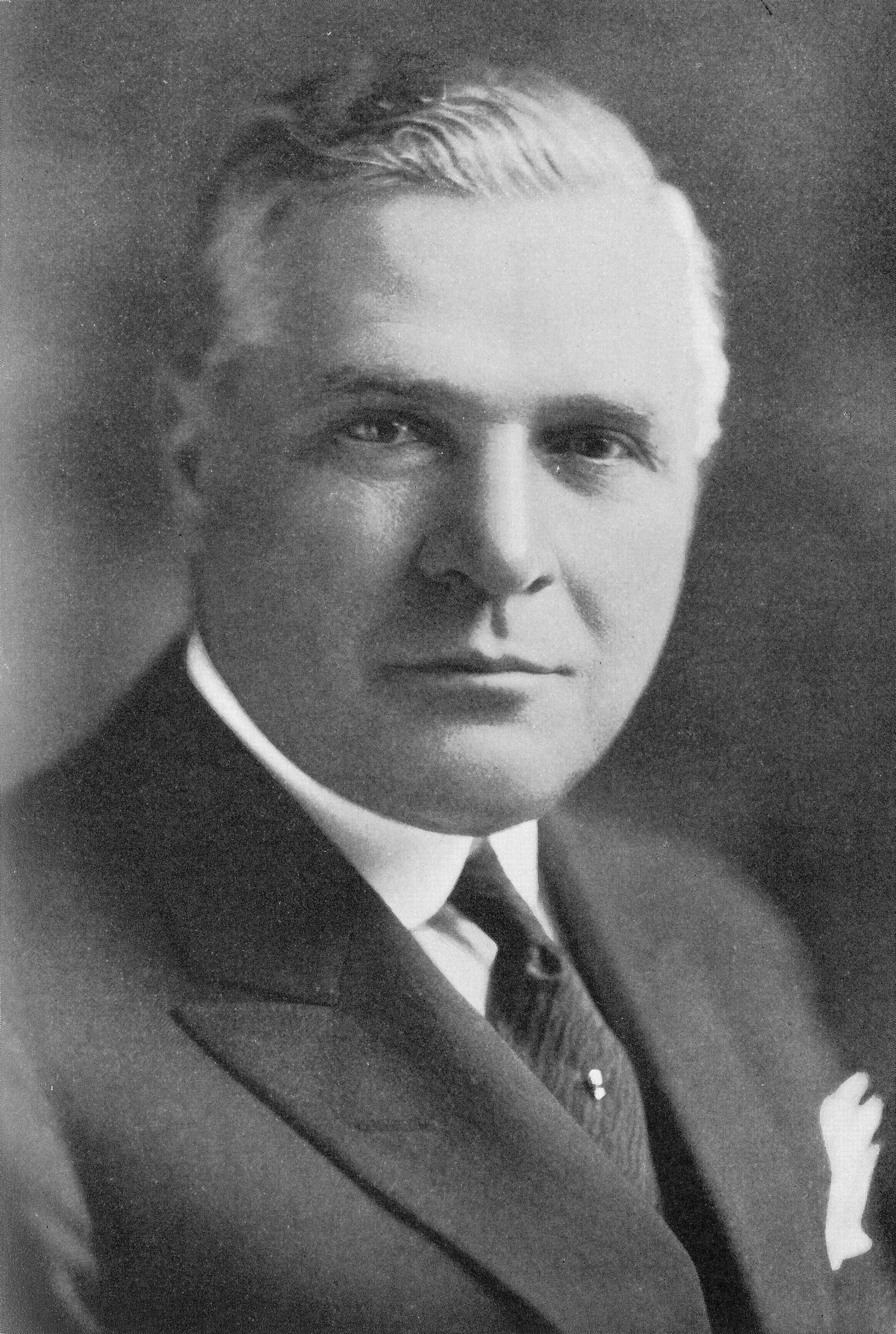

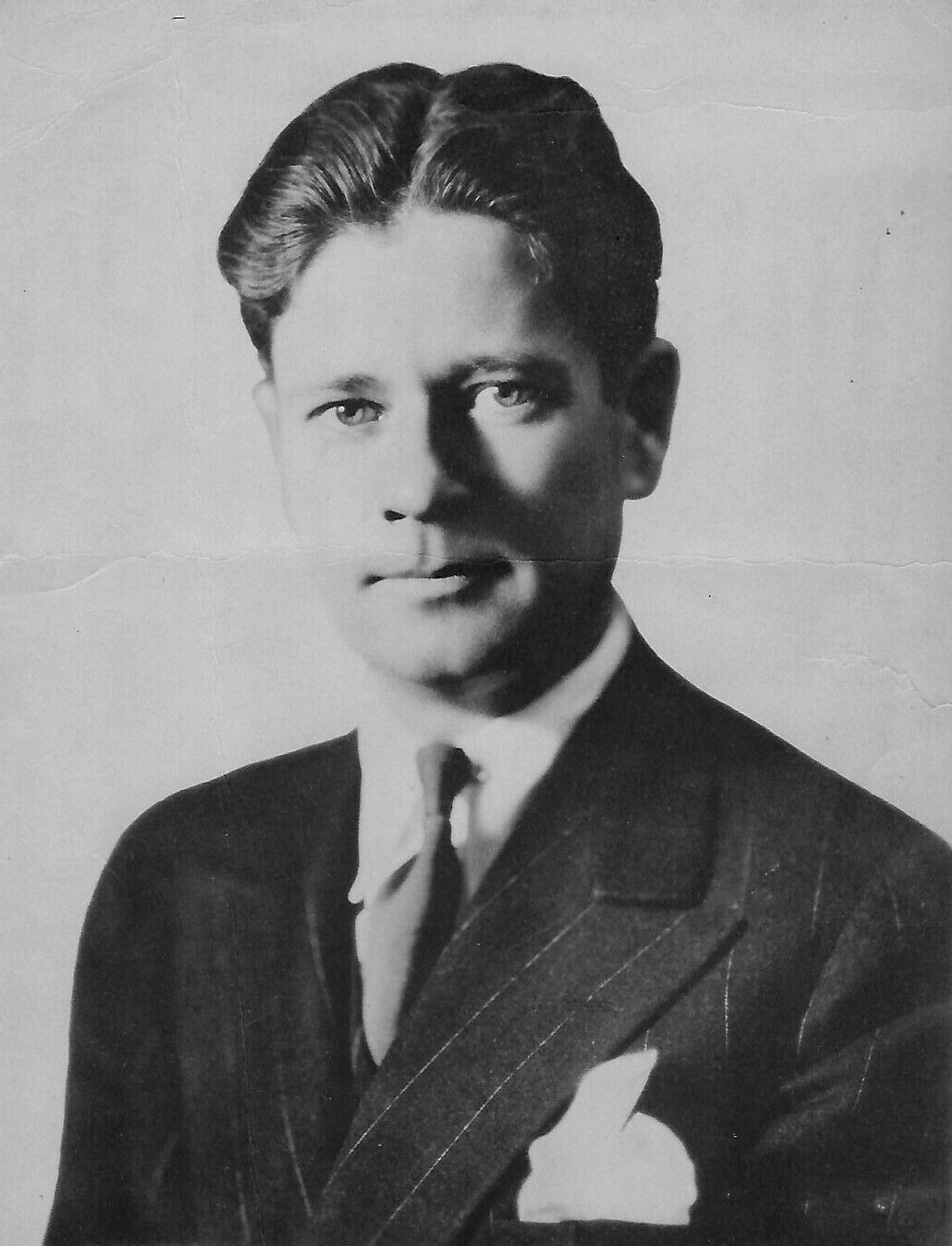

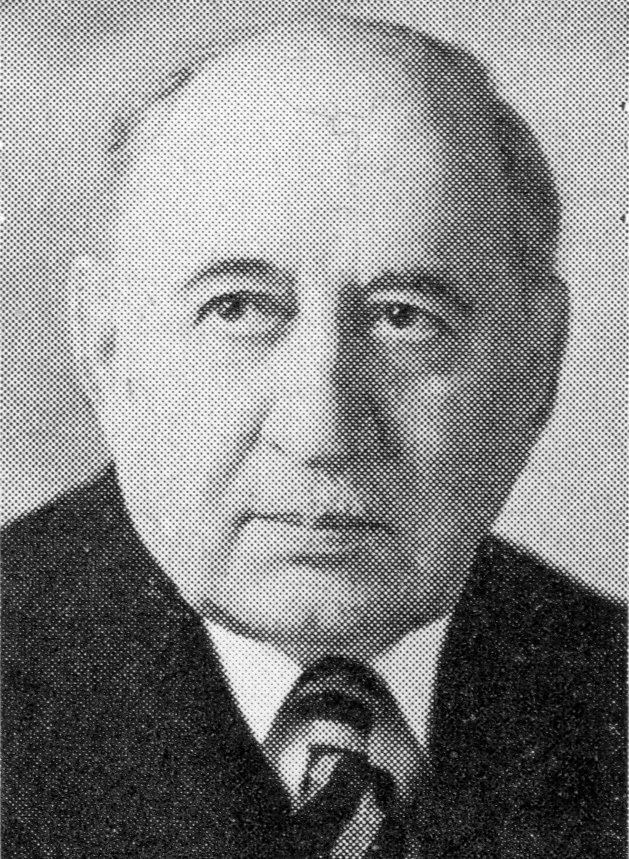
Nominee	Julius P. Heil	Philip La Follette	Harry W. Bolens
Party	Republican	Progressive	Democratic
Popular vote	543,675	353,381	78,446
Percentage	55.39%	36.00%	7.99%
- County results Heil: 40–50% 50–60% 60–70% 70–80% La Follette: 40–50% 50–60%
Governor before election
Philip La Follette
Progressive
Elected Governor
Julius P. Heil
Republican

The 1938 Wisconsin gubernatorial election was held on November 8, 1938. Incumbent Progressive Governor Philip La Follette was defeated by Republican nominee Julius P. Heil.

Primary elections were held on September 20, 1938.

== Background ==
=== The 1937 special session ===
Despite having a high initial popularity, La Follette's reputation had begun to deteriorate as his governorship ran its course. This all culminated in the disastrous 1937 special session, where La Follette attempted to force through a bill without public debate, and without the normal machinery of the legislative process. The bill, decried by critics as dictatorial, would have, among other things, fundamentally altered the system of checks and balances in Wisconsin by making it so that legislation would be written up by the executive and handed to the legislature to either approve or reject. Alongside this, the session passed through legislation reorganizing the state executive branch to remove redundant agencies to improve efficiency. This had been one of the final blows for the establishment, who had begun to talk of electoral fusion to defeat La Follette.

=== Coalition talks ===
At Oshkosh, a committee was established by members of the Democratic, Republican, Union, and Progressive parties in the hope of defeating La Follette. In their goals they aligned with Robert Kirkland Henry, the former Democratic state treasurer, in that goal. Despite the bipartisan nature of this committee, it was still done in opposition to the leadership of both parties. Due to the nature of the primary system in Wisconsin, one candidate could not officially run under multiple party lines, so instead, the candidate would be required to give up one party to run under another, to the coalition hopefuls, that meant the party of their candidate got the fewest votes in.

Henry stood for both the Democratic and Republican nominations as part of a coalition movement designed to defeat Philip La Follette and the Progressive Party. If he had won both nominations, he intended to decline the nomination of the party in whose primary he received fewest votes.

== Progressive primary ==
=== Candidates ===
==== Nominee ====
- Philip La Follette, incumbent Governor

==== Eliminated in primary ====
- Glenn P. Turner, Socialist nominee for Attorney General of Wisconsin in 1930 and 1934

=== Results ===
Progressive primary results
Party	Candidate	Votes	%
Progressive	Philip La Follette (incumbent)	136,291	80.21%
Progressive	Glenn P. Turner	33,631	19.79%
Total votes		169,922	100.00%

== Republican primary ==
=== Candidates ===
==== Nominee ====
- Julius P. Heil, industrialist

==== Eliminated in primary ====
- Robert Kirkland Henry, former Democratic Wisconsin State Treasurer (1933–1937)
- Clun L. Miller, insurance counsellor
- James G. Peterson, farmer

=== Results ===
Republican primary results
Party	Candidate	Votes	%
Republican	Julius P. Heil	126,820	55.83%
Republican	Robert Kirkland Henry	73,348	32.29%
Republican	James G. Peterson	20,262	8.92%
Republican	Clun L. Miller	6,729	2.96%
Total votes		227,159	100.00%

== Democratic primary ==
=== Candidates ===
==== Nominee ====
- Robert Kirkland Henry, former Wisconsin State Treasurer (1933–1937) (withdrew)

==== Eliminated in primary ====
- Jerome F. Fox, former state representative from Calumet (1931–1935)
- Edward Ihlenfeldt, unsuccessful candidate for Democratic nomination for Secretary of State of Wisconsin in 1934

=== Results ===
Democratic primary results
Party	Candidate	Votes	%
Democratic	Robert Kirkland Henry	64,363	51.15%
Democratic	Jerome F. Fox	50,497	40.13%
Democratic	Edward Ihlenfeldt	10,984	6.73%
Total votes		125,844	100.00%

=== Aftermath ===
Henry won the Democratic nomination but lost the Republican nomination to Julius P. Heil. On October 1, 1938, Henry withdrew from the election in favour of Heil. On October 7, 1938, the Democratic state central committee met and nominated State Senator Harry W. Bolens, another proponent of a coalition, to replace Henry on the Democratic ticket.

== Union primary ==
=== Nominee ===
- Frank W. Smith

=== Results ===
Union primary results
Party	Candidate	Votes	%
Union	Frank W. Smith	2,553	100.00%
Total votes		2,553	100.00%

== General election ==
=== Candidates ===
Major party candidates

- Harry W. Bolens, Democratic
- Julius P. Heil, Republican
- Philip La Follette, Progressive

Other candidates

- John Schleier Jr., (Independent) Socialist Labor
- Frank W. Smith, Union

=== Results ===
1938 Wisconsin gubernatorial election
Party	Candidate	Votes	%	±%
Republican	Julius P. Heil	543,675	55.39%	+25.97%
Progressive	Philip La Follette (incumbent)	353,381	36.00%	−10.37%
Democratic	Harry W. Bolens	78,446	7.99%	−13.71%
Union	Frank W. Smith	4,564	0.47%	−1.79%
Socialist Labor (Note: "Independent Socialist Labor")	John Schleier, Jr.	1,459	0.15%	+0.01%
	Scattering (Note: These are not listed in the Blue Book but are listed in the Board of Canvassers report.)	35	0.00%	
Majority		190,294	19.39%	
Total votes		981,560	100.00%	
Republican gain from Progressive		Swing	+36.34%	

=== Results by county ===
Iron County voted for the losing candidate for the first time in this election. Adams County, Burnett County, Jackson County, and Washburn County all voted for the losing candidate for the first time since 1892.

County	Julius P. Heil Republican		Philip La Follette Progressive		Harry W. Bolens Democratic		All Others Various		Margin (Note: All margins are Heil over La Follette)		Total votes cast
County	#	%	#	%	#	%	#	%	#	%	Total votes cast
Adams	1,180	44.13%	1,379	51.57%	104	3.89%	11	0.41%	-199	-7.44%	2,674
Ashland	3,100	43.50%	3,447	48.37%	538	7.55%	42	0.59%	-347	-4.87%	7,127
Barron	5,329	56.28%	3,733	39.43%	356	3.76%	50	0.53%	1,596	16.86%	9,468
Bayfield	2,197	37.83%	3,363	57.90%	227	3.91%	21	0.36%	-1,166	-20.08%	5,808
Brown	11,290	51.39%	6,735	30.66%	3,819	17.38%	124	0.56%	4,555	20.73%	21,968
Buffalo	2,231	48.65%	2,225	48.52%	117	2.55%	13	0.28%	6	0.13%	4,586
Burnett	1,417	39.46%	1,964	54.69%	176	4.90%	34	0.95%	-547	-15.23%	3,591
Calumet	4,154	64.17%	1,679	25.94%	624	9.64%	16	0.25%	2,475	38.24%	6,473
Chippewa	7,733	63.59%	3,943	32.42%	457	3.76%	28	0.23%	3,790	31.17%	12,161
Clark	3,469	64.34%	2,907	28.91%	600	5.97%	79	0.79%	3,562	35.43%	10,055
Columbia	6,358	57.00%	4,176	37.44%	601	5.39%	20	0.18%	2,182	19.56%	11,155
Crawford	3,558	56.31%	1,610	25.48%	1,026	16.24%	125	1.98%	1,948	30.83%	6,319
Dane	18,279	47.48%	18,508	48.08%	1,611	4.18%	98	0.25%	-229	-0.59%	38,496
Dodge	11,432	64.75%	4,444	25.17%	1,729	9.79%	51	0.29%	6,988	39.58%	17,656
Door	3,318	68.02%	1,266	25.95%	251	5.15%	43	0.88%	2,052	42.07%	4,878
Douglas	8,422	42.93%	9,508	48.47%	1,515	7.72%	173	0.88%	-1,086	-5.54%	19,618
Dunn	4,934	60.97%	2,947	36.41%	196	2.42%	16	0.20%	1,987	24.55%	8,093
Eau Claire	7,117	53.57%	5,599	42.14%	532	4.00%	38	0.29%	1,518	11.43%	13,286
Florence	760	40.69%	977	52.30%	111	5.94%	20	1.07%	-217	-11.62%	1,868
Fond du Lac	12,255	61.76%	4,896	24.67%	2,544	12.82%	148	0.75%	7,359	37.09%	19,843
Forest	1,687	42.09%	1,798	44.86%	495	12.35%	28	0.70%	-111	-2.77%	4,008
Grant	7,357	59.55%	3,983	32.24%	960	7.77%	54	0.44%	3,374	27.31%	12,354
Green	4,270	55.07%	2,984	38.48%	251	3.24%	249	3.21%	1,286	16.58%	7,754
Green Lake	3,657	67.13%	1,147	21.05%	624	11.45%	20	0.37%	2,510	46.07%	5,448
Iowa	3,479	58.46%	2,048	34.41%	407	6.84%	17	0.29%	1,431	24.05%	5,951
Iron	1,774	38.67%	2,628	57.28%	175	3.81%	11	0.24%	-854	-18.61%	4,588
Jackson	2,267	47.26%	2,274	47.40%	240	5.00%	16	0.33%	-7	-0.15%	4,797
Jefferson	8,324	64.07%	3,385	26.05%	1,244	9.58%	39	0.30%	4,939	38.02%	12,992
Juneau	3,800	55.50%	2,588	37.80%	446	6.51%	13	0.19%	1,212	17.70%	6,847
Kenosha	10,853	47.24%	10,182	44.32%	1,830	7.97%	108	0.47%	671	2.92%	22,973
Kewaunee	3,972	66.01%	1,276	21.21%	736	12.23%	33	0.55%	2,696	44.81%	6,017
La Crosse	10,946	59.19%	6,624	35.82%	892	4.82%	32	0.17%	4,322	23.37%	18,494
Lafayette	3,948	52.17%	2,548	33.67%	1,059	13.99%	12	0.16%	1,400	18.50%	7,567
Langlade	3,833	46.55%	3,091	37.53%	1,265	15.36%	46	0.56%	742	9.01%	8,235
Lincoln	4,356	54.15%	3,309	41.13%	337	4.19%	43	0.53%	1,047	13.01%	8,045
Manitowoc	10,391	52.76%	6,997	35.53%	1,955	9.93%	350	1.78%	3,394	17.23%	19,693
Marathon	12,310	57.85%	7,198	33.83%	1,643	7.72%	127	0.60%	5,112	24.02%	21,278
Marinette	6,370	56.78%	3,657	32.60%	1,149	10.24%	42	0.37%	2,713	24.18%	11,218
Marquette	2,355	70.15%	733	21.83%	262	7.80%	7	0.21%	1,622	48.32%	3,357
Milwaukee	118,617	51.94%	87,916	38.50%	20,272	8.88%	1,575	0.69%	30,701	13.44%	228,380
Monroe	5,529	59.07%	3,478	37.16%	333	3.56%	20	0.21%	2,051	21.91%	9,360
Oconto	4,800	52.67%	3,169	34.77%	1,087	11.93%	58	0.64%	1,631	17.90%	9,114
Oneida	3,303	47.13%	3,261	46.53%	400	5.71%	45	0.64%	42	0.60%	7,009
Outagamie	12,365	63.40%	4,658	23.88%	2,031	10.41%	450	2.31%	7,707	39.51%	19,504
Ozaukee	4,143	63.52%	1,464	22.45%	884	13.55%	31	0.48%	2,679	41.08%	6,522
Pepin	1,494	59.52%	869	34.62%	145	5.78%	2	0.08%	625	24.90%	2,510
Pierce	3,249	51.38%	2,770	43.80%	229	3.62%	76	1.20%	479	7.57%	6,324
Polk	3,323	44.59%	3,876	52.01%	217	2.91%	37	0.50%	-553	-7.42%	7,453
Portage	5,243	46.06%	4,068	35.73%	2,024	17.78%	49	0.43%	1,175	10.32%	11,384
Price	3,427	52.30%	2,664	40.65%	423	6.46%	39	0.60%	763	11.64%	6,553
Racine	16,764	52.01%	12,850	39.86%	2,516	7.81%	105	0.33%	3,914	12.14%	32,235
Richland	4,250	73.01%	1,276	21.92%	283	4.86%	12	0.21%	2,974	51.09%	5,821
Rock	15,612	59.68%	9,051	34.60%	1,454	5.56%	41	0.16%	6,561	25.08%	26,158
Rusk	3,011	56.31%	1,997	37.35%	314	5.87%	25	0.47%	1,014	18.96%	5,347
Sauk	6,654	58.71%	4,227	37.29%	434	3.83%	19	0.17%	2,427	21.41%	11,334
Sawyer	2,131	52.72%	1,465	36.24%	439	10.86%	7	0.17%	666	16.48%	4,042
Shawano	5,518	58.29%	3,422	36.15%	489	5.17%	37	0.39%	2,096	22.14%	9,466
Sheboygan	14,616	66.31%	3,705	16.81%	3,418	15.51%	304	1.38%	10,911	49.50%	22,043
St. Croix	3,836	47.06%	3,543	43.47%	699	8.58%	73	0.90%	293	3.59%	8,151
Taylor	2,762	45.56%	2,792	46.06%	454	7.49%	54	0.89%	-30	-0.49%	6,062
Trempealeau	3,502	48.87%	3,168	44.21%	479	6.68%	17	0.24%	334	4.66%	7,166
Vernon	5,327	60.34%	3,234	36.63%	249	2.82%	19	0.22%	2,093	23.71%	8,829
Vilas	2,047	52.33%	1,548	39.57%	306	7.82%	11	0.28%	499	12.76%	3,912
Walworth	8,211	74.66%	2,203	20.03%	563	5.12%	21	0.19%	6,008	45.63%	10,998
Washburn	1,880	45.45%	2,081	50.31%	160	3.87%	15	0.36%	-201	-4.86%	4,136
Washington	7,594	70.38%	2,356	21.84%	793	7.35%	47	0.44%	5,238	48.54%	10,790
Waukesha	15,363	71.55%	5,198	24.21%	861	4.01%	49	0.23%	10,165	47.34%	21,471
Waupaca	7,502	64.41%	3,720	31.94%	385	3.31%	40	0.34%	3,782	32.47%	11,647
Waushara	3,592	69.06%	1,449	27.86%	150	2.88%	10	0.19%	2,143	41.20%	5,201
Winnebago	14,020	60.40%	6,845	29.49%	2,083	8.97%	264	1.14%	7,175	30.91%	23,212
Wood	6,508	51.30%	5,302	41.79%	768	6.05%	109	0.86%	1,206	9.51%	12,687
Total	543,675	55.39%	353,381	36.00%	78,446	7.99%	6,058	0.62%	190,294	19.39%	981,560

==== Counties that flipped from Progressive to Republican ====
- Barron
- Brown
- Buffalo
- Calumet
- Clark
- Columbia
- Crawford
- Door
- Dunn
- Eau Claire
- Grant
- Green
- Iowa
- Jefferson
- Juneau
- Kenosha
- Kewaunee
- La Crosse
- Lafayette
- Langlade
- Lincoln
- Manitowoc
- Marathon
- Marinette
- Milwaukee
- Monroe
- Oconto
- Oneida
- Outagamie
- Ozaukee
- Pepin
- Pierce
- Portage
- Price
- Racine
- Rusk
- Sauk
- Sawyer
- Shawano
- St. Croix
- Trempealeau
- Vernon
- Vilas
- Washington
- Waukesha
- Waupaca
- Wood

==== Counties that flipped from Democratic to Republican ====
- Dodge
- Sheboygan

== Bibliography ==
- Gubernatorial Elections, 1787-1997. Washington, D.C.: Congressional Quarterly Inc. 1998. ISBN 1-56802-396-0.
- Ohm, Howard F.; Bryhan, Leone G., eds. (1940). The Wisconsin Blue Book, 1940. State of Wisconsin.
