= John L. Sonderegger =

American businessman and politician

John Lawrence Sonderegger

23rd Treasurer of Wisconsin
- In office August 19, 1947 – September 30, 1948
- Governor: Oscar Rennebohm
- Preceded by: John M. Smith
- Succeeded by: Clyde M. Johnston

16th Commissioner of Insurance of Wisconsin
- In office October 1, 1948 – December 1, 1948
- Governor: Oscar Rennebohm
- Preceded by: Morvin Duel
- Succeeded by: John R. Lange

Personal details
- Born: December 8, 1914 Milwaukee, Wisconsin, U.S.
- Died: March 25, 1992 (aged 77) Tucson, Arizona, U.S.
- Education: University of Wisconsin–Madison (Ph.D.)

John Lawrence Sonderegger (December 8, 1914 – March 25, 1992) was an American businessman and politician.

Born in Milwaukee, Wisconsin, he was educated in the Milwaukee school system. In 1940, Sonderegger received his doctorate degree in business from University of Wisconsin–Madison. In 1936, he started to work for Rennebohm Drug Store and became the company's secretary and comptroller. On August 19, 1947, Acting Governor of Wisconsin Oscar Rennebohm appointed Sonderegger Wisconsin State Treasurer because of the death of John M. Smith. He resigned on September 30, 1948 to become Wisconsin state insurance commissioner. Sonderegger worked at several other companies and help with the merger of Rennebohm Drug Stores with Walgreens. He also served on the board of trustees of the Oscar Rennebohm Foundation.

Sonderegger died while vacationing in Tucson, Arizona in 1992.

== Notes ==
Political offices
Preceded by John M. Smith	Treasurer of Wisconsin; 1947–1948	Succeeded by Clyde M. Johnston
