= Dena A. Smith =

American politician (1899–1968)

26th & 28th Treasurer of Wisconsin
- In office January 2, 1961 – February 20, 1968
- Governor: Gaylord Nelson; John W. Reynolds Jr. Warren Knowles
- Preceded by: Eugene M. Lamb
- Succeeded by: Harold W. Clemens
- In office December 4, 1957 – January 5, 1959
- Governor: Vernon W. Thomson
- Preceded by: Warren R. Smith
- Succeeded by: Eugene M. Lamb

Personal details
- Born: Dena Besserdich; October 19, 1899 Kewaunee, Wisconsin, US
- Died: February 20, 1968 (aged 68) Wisconsin, US
- Cause of death: Double pneumonia
- Party: Republican

Dena A. Smith (October 19, 1899 – February 20, 1968) was the state treasurer of Wisconsin from 1957 to 1959 and from 1961 until her death in office in 1968. She was the first woman to be elected to a statewide constitutional office in Wisconsin.

She was born in Kewaunee, Wisconsin, as Dena Besserdich, the daughter of Charles Besserdich and Emma Stups Besserdich. Smith was a business manager for music stores in Milwaukee, Wisconsin. During that period, Smith was a member of State, National and International Federation of Business and Professional Women's Clubs. Active in party politics, Smith served three terms as vice chairman of the 4th congressional district Republican executive committee and was a Republican presidential elector in 1960.

She assisted her husband Warren R. Smith as deputy treasurer when he was state treasurer, and she was appointed to succeed him when he died by Governor Vernon Thomson. She was elected to the office in 1960 and she served until her death from double pneumonia on February 20, 1968.

== Notes ==
Party political offices
Preceded by Warren R. Smith	Republican nominee for State Treasurer of Wisconsin; 1958, 1960, 1962, 1964, 1966	Succeeded by Harold W. Clemens
Political offices
Preceded by Warren R. Smith	Treasurer of Wisconsin; 1957–1959	Succeeded by Eugene M. Lamb
Preceded by Eugene M. Lamb	Treasurer of Wisconsin; 1961–1968	Succeeded by Harold W. Clemens
