= Henry Baetz =

19th century American politician

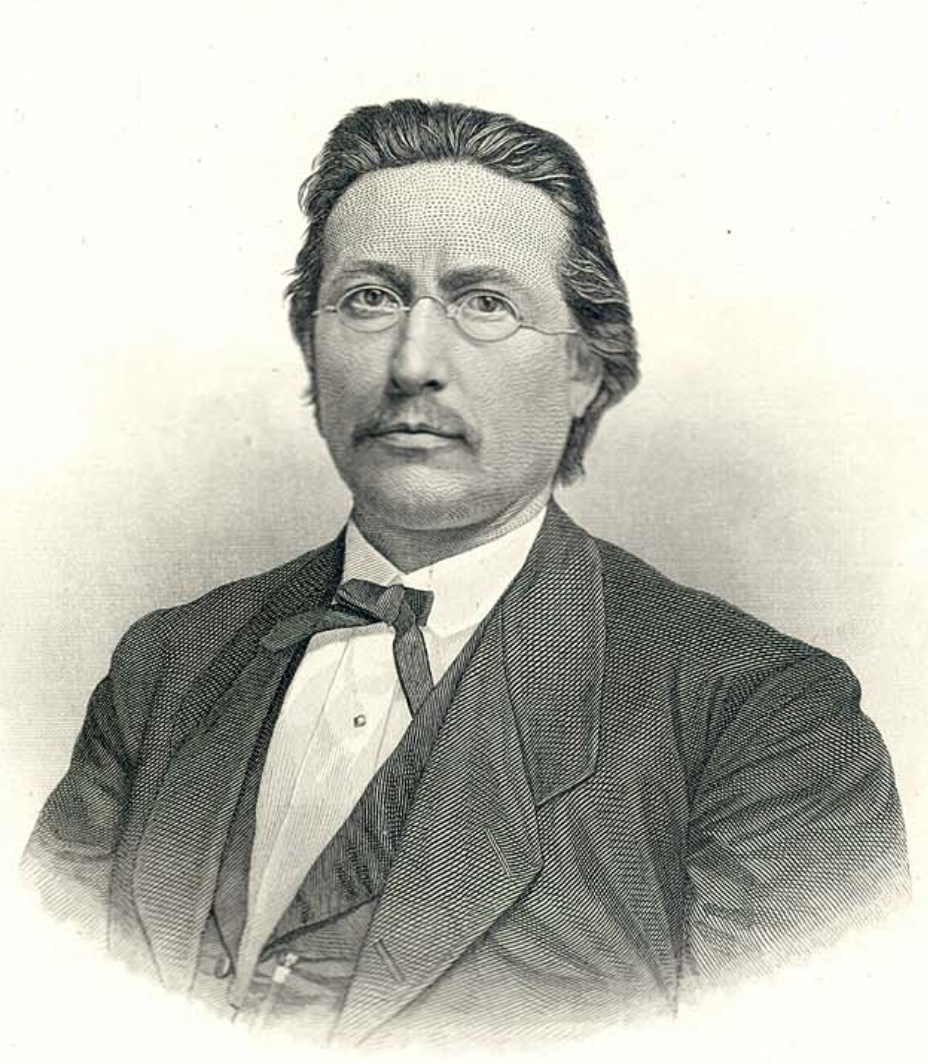

6th State Treasurer of Wisconsin
- In office January 3, 1870 – January 5, 1874
- Governor: Lucius Fairchild; Cadwallader C. Washburn
- Preceded by: William E. Smith
- Succeeded by: Ferdinand Kuehn

Personal details
- Born: Henry Baetz; July 27, 1830 Stockhausen, Hesse
- Died: January 2, 1910 (aged 79) Wisconsin, U.S.
- Resting place: Evergreen Cemetery; Manitowoc, Wisconsin
- Party: Republican

Military service
- Allegiance: United States
- Branch/service: United States Volunteers; Union Army
- Years of service: 1862–1863
- Rank: Major, USV
- Unit: 26th Reg. Wis. Vol. Infantry
- Battles/wars: American Civil War: Fredericksburg campaign; Battle of Fredericksburg; Mud March; Chancellorsville campaign; Battle of Chancellorsville; Gettysburg campaign; Battle of Gettysburg

Henry Baetz (July 27, 1830 – January 2, 1910) was a German American immigrant real estate and insurance agent. He was the 6th State Treasurer of Wisconsin, served in the American Civil War as a Union Army officer, and was wounded at Gettysburg.

== Biography ==
Baetz was born in Stockhausen, in the Grand Duchy of Hesse (in modern day Germany). He moved to Two Rivers, Wisconsin, in 1853. Later, he moved to Kewaunee, Wisconsin, before settling in Manitowoc, Wisconsin.

== Civil War ==
In 1862, Baetz volunteered for service in the Union Army. He was commissioned captain on September 9, 1862, of Company F in the German American 26th Wisconsin Infantry Regiment as it organized at Camp Sigel in Milwaukee. The regiment mustered into service on September 17 and left the state on October 6. The 26th was ordered to the Eastern Theater and attached to XI Corps in the Army of the Potomac. Captain Baetz was promoted to major on March 15, 1863, just before the Battle of Chancellorsville. The regiment was engaged in serious fighting at Chancellorsville, when they were posted on a ridge alongside the 119th New York Infantry Regiment on the right edge of the Union line. The 26th Wisconsin took 177 casualties during the fighting at Chancellorsville, including their colonel, William H. Jacobs, who was wounded and had to leave the front.

After Chancellorsville, Lt. Colonel Hans Boebal took command of the regiment, and Major Baetz functioned as his second-in-command. At the Battle of Gettysburg, the XI Corps was ordered, during the first day of fighting, to proceed north of the city and establish a defensive position on Oak Hill. Confederates under Robert E. Rodes, however, arrived at the hill first, and XI Corps was forced to establish defensive positions in the field below the hill. They quickly came under intense fire from Lt. General Richard S. Ewell's Corps advancing from the north. XI Corps was forced to fall back, and both Major Baetz and Lt. Colonel Boebal were wounded in the fighting and were unable to continue. Major Baetz resigned from the Army on October 8, 1863, and returned to Wisconsin.

== Political career ==
He was town clerk for Manitowoc in 1857, and was elected Register of Deeds for Manitowoc County in 1858 and 1860. He was elected State Treasurer of Manitowoc County in 1866 and 1868. In 1868, Baetz was a delegate to the Republican National Convention in Chicago that nominated Ulysses S. Grant for President of the United States. He was elected State Treasurer of Wisconsin in 1869 alongside fellow Gettysburg veteran, Governor Lucius Fairchild, and was re-elected in 1871. He did not seek re-election in 1873. He moved to Milwaukee in 1875 and was the first chief librarian for the Milwaukee Public Library from 1878 to 1880. He returned to state office in 1880 and served as Secretary of the State Board of Immigration from 1880 to 1883.

Baetz died on January 2, 1910.

== Electoral history ==
=== Wisconsin Treasurer (1869, 1871) ===
Wisconsin State Treasurer Election, 1869
Party	Candidate	Votes	%	±%
General Election, November 2, 1869
Republican	Henry Baetz	69,823	53.51%	
Democratic	John Black	60,672	46.49%	
Plurality		9,151	7.01%	
Total votes		130,495	100.0%	
Republican hold				

Wisconsin State Treasurer Election, 1871
Party	Candidate	Votes	%	±%
General Election, November 7, 1871
Republican	Henry Baetz (incumbent)	78,920	53.65%	−0.15%
Democratic	Anton Klaus	68,171	46.35%	
Plurality		10,749	7.31%	+0.30%
Total votes		147,091	100.0%	+0.13%
Republican hold				

=== Wisconsin Treasurer (1875) ===
Wisconsin State Treasurer Election, 1875
Party	Candidate	Votes	%	±%
General Election, November 2, 1875
Democratic	Ferdinand Kuehn (incumbent)	86,230	50.83%	−4.37%
Republican	Henry Baetz	83,426	49.17%	
Plurality		2,804	1.65%	-8.75%
Total votes		169,656	100.0%	+14.77%
Democratic hold				

Party political offices
Preceded by William E. Smith	Republican nominee for State Treasurer of Wisconsin; 1869, 1871	Succeeded by Ole C. Johnson
Preceded by Ole C. Johnson	Republican nominee for State Treasurer of Wisconsin; 1875	Succeeded by Richard W. Guenther
Political offices
Preceded by William E. Smith	State Treasurer of Wisconsin; January 3, 1870 – January 5, 1874	Succeeded by Ferdinand Kuehn
