= Thomas M. Purtell =

American politician

Thomas M. Purtell was an American politician from Wisconsin.

Purtell served as State Treasurer of Wisconsin from July 30, 1904 until January 2, 1905. On August 30, 1904, Robert M. La Follette, Sr. Governor of Wisconsin removed John J. Kempf from office and appointed Purtell acting treasurer.

== Notes ==
Political offices
Preceded by John J. Kempf	Treasurer of Wisconsin; 1904–1905	Succeeded by John J. Kempf
