= Lewiston, Wisconsin =

- Town
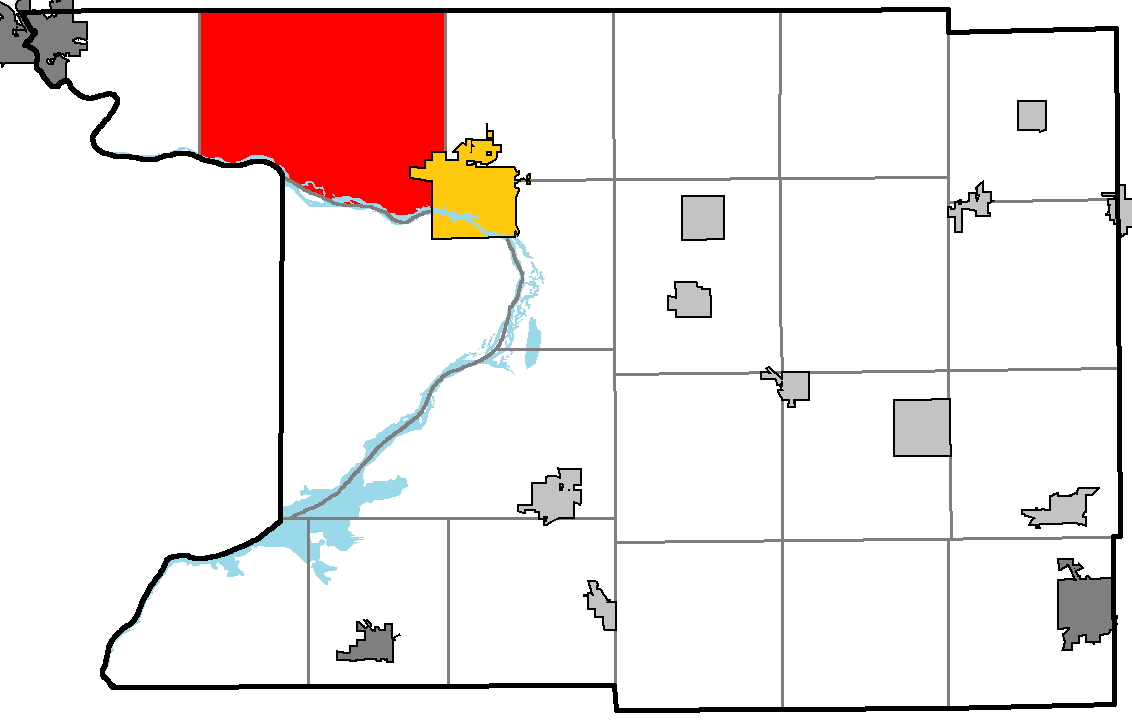
- Location of Lewiston, within Columbia County, Wisconsin

- Location of Columbia County, Wisconsin
- Coordinates: 43°35′20″N 89°33′33″W
- Country: United States
- State: Wisconsin
- County: Columbia

Area
  - Total: 54.9 sq mi (142.2 km^{2})
  - Land: 54.0 sq mi (139.8 km^{2})
  - Water: 0.97 sq mi (2.5 km^{2})
- Elevation: 804 ft (245 m)

Population (2020)
  - Total: 1,262
  - Density: 23.38/sq mi (9.027/km^{2})
- Time zone: UTC-6 (Central (CST))
  - Summer (DST): UTC-5 (CDT)
- FIPS code: 55-43775
- GNIS feature ID: 1583549
- Website: https://lewistontownshipwi.org/

Lewiston is a town in Columbia County, Wisconsin, United States. The population was 1,262 at the 2020 census.

== Geography ==
According to the United States Census Bureau, the town has a total area of 54.9 square miles (142.2 km^{2}), of which 54 square miles (139.8 km^{2}) is land and 1 square mile (2.5 km^{2}) (1.75%) is water.

== Demographics ==
As of the census of 2000, there were 1,187 people, 473 households, and 347 families residing in the town. The population density was 22 people per square mile (8.5/km^{2}). There were 573 housing units at an average density of 10.6 per square mile (4.1/km^{2}). The racial makeup of the town was 97.89% White, 0.51% Native American, 0.25% Asian, 0.17% from other races, and 1.18% from two or more races. Hispanic or Latino people of any race were 1.01% of the population.

There were 473 households, out of which 30.4% had children under the age of 18 living with them, 63.6% were married couples living together, 4.2% had a female householder with no husband present, and 26.6% were non-families. 20.1% of all households were made up of individuals, and 7.4% had someone living alone who was 65 years of age or older. The average household size was 2.51 and the average family size was 2.88.

In the town, the population was spread out, with 23.3% under the age of 18, 5.8% from 18 to 24, 28.7% from 25 to 44, 29.5% from 45 to 64, and 12.7% who were 65 years of age or older. The median age was 41 years. For every 100 females, there were 109.7 males. For every 100 females age 18 and over, there were 111.9 males.

The median income for a household in the town was $45,962, and the median income for a family was $51,125. Males had a median income of $36,810 versus $23,214 for females. The per capita income for the town was $19,644. About 3.3% of families and 5.3% of the population were below the poverty line, including 6.6% of those under age 18 and 12.2% of those age 65 or over.

== Historic site ==
The Aldo Leopold Shack and Farm is located six miles south, in the town of Fairfield, in Sauk County.

== Notable person ==
- Andrew H. Dahl, former politician
