= Henry B. Harshaw =

19th century American politician

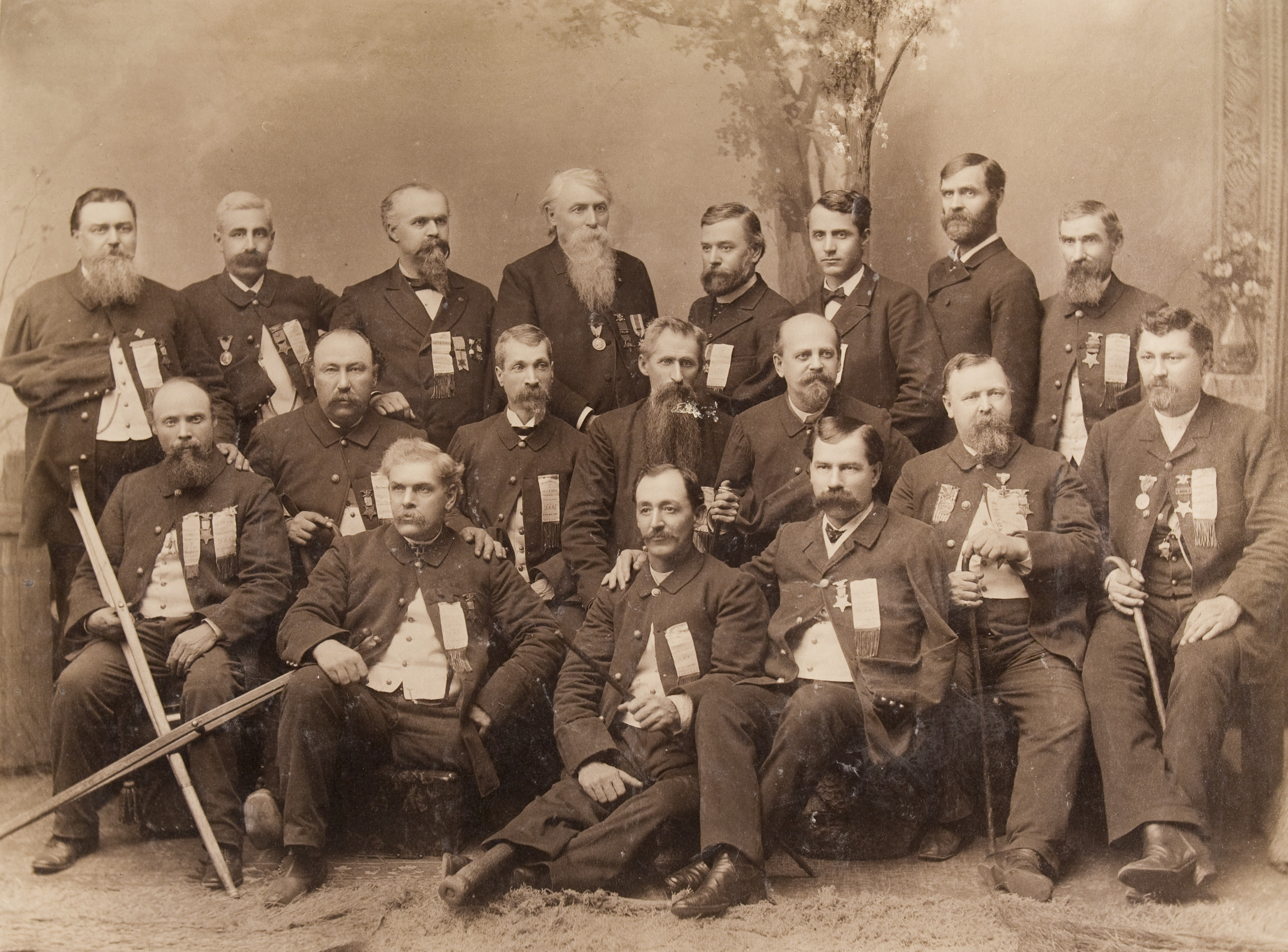
- Top row, fifth from left

10th Treasurer of Wisconsin
- In office January 3, 1887 – January 5, 1891
- Governor: Jeremiah McLain Rusk; William D. Hoard
- Preceded by: Edward C. McFetridge
- Succeeded by: John Hunner

Personal details
- Born: June 14, 1842 Argyle, New York, U.S.
- Died: December 25, 1900 (aged 58) Milwaukee, Wisconsin, U.S.
- Cause of death: Tongue cancer
- Resting place: Riverside Cemetery, Oshkosh, Wisconsin
- Party: Republican
- Profession: lawyer

Military service
- Allegiance: United States
- Branch/service: United States Volunteers; Union Army
- Years of service: 1861–1864
- Rank: 2nd Lieutenant, USV
- Unit: 2nd Reg. Wis. Vol. Infantry
- Battles/wars: American Civil War

Henry Baldwin Harshaw (June 14, 1842 – December 25, 1900) was an American lawyer and Republican politician. He was the 10th State Treasurer of Wisconsin. He served in the famed Iron Brigade of the Army of the Potomac during the American Civil War and lost his left arm at the Battle of Chaffin's Farm. He is the namesake of Harshaw, Wisconsin.

== Biography ==
Harshaw was born Henry Baldwin Harshaw on June 14, 1842, in Argyle, New York. He moved to Oshkosh, Wisconsin in 1854. Harshaw married Georgia M. Finney in 1864. During the American Civil War, he served with the 2nd Wisconsin Infantry Regiment. While serving, he would be severely wounded and ultimately lose his left arm. Harshaw died of tongue cancer in Milwaukee, Wisconsin on December 25, 1900. The community of Harshaw, Wisconsin, was named in his honor.

== Political career ==
Harshaw was Treasurer from 1887 to 1891. Additionally, he was the postmaster of the Oshkosh post office and a circuit court clerk. He was a Republican.

Party political offices
Preceded by Edward C. McFetridge	Republican nominee for State Treasurer of Wisconsin; 1886, 1888	Succeeded by Albert B. Geilfuss
Political offices
Preceded by Edward C. McFetridge	State Treasurer of Wisconsin; January 3, 1887 – January 5, 1891	Succeeded by John Hunner
