= Ferdinand Kuehn =

19th century American politician

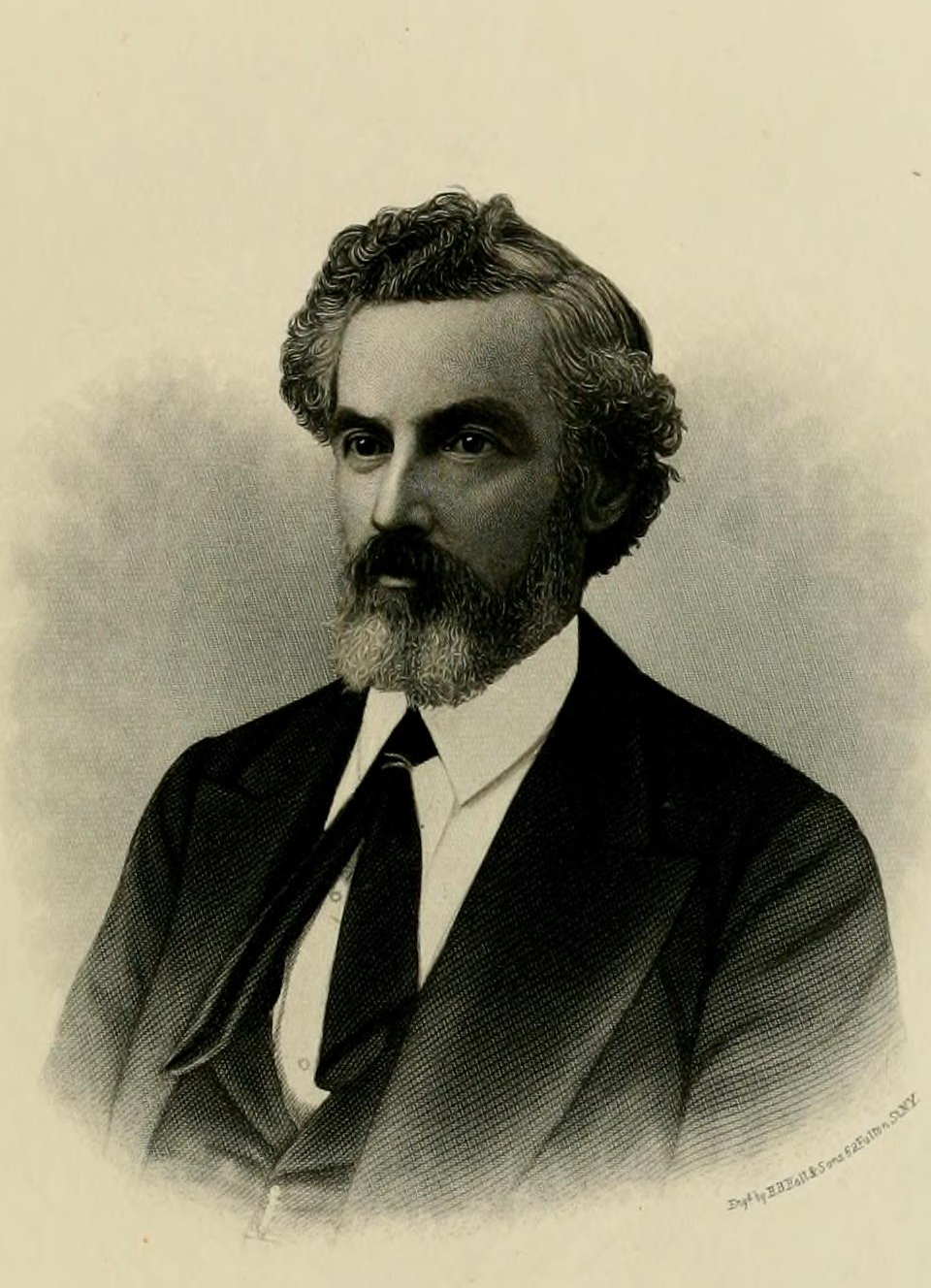
- Portrait from the United States biographical dictionary and portrait gallery of eminent and self-made men; Wisconsin volume (1877)

7th State Treasurer of Wisconsin
- In office January 5, 1874 – January 7, 1878
- Governor: William Robert Taylor; Harrison Ludington
- Preceded by: Henry Baetz
- Succeeded by: Richard Guenther

Personal details
- Born: January 22, 1821 Augsburg, Kingdom of Bavaria
- Died: January 31, 1901 (aged 80) Milwaukee, Wisconsin, U.S.
- Resting place: Forest Home Cemetery, Milwaukee, Wisconsin
- Party: Democratic
- Spouse: Caroline Kuehn (died 1892)
- Children: at least 5

Ferdinand Kuehn (January 22, 1821 – January 31, 1901) was an American businessman, and Democratic politician. He served as the 7th State Treasurer of Wisconsin.

== Biography ==
Born in Augsburg, Kingdom of Bavaria, he worked in banking in Switzerland. In 1844, he moved to Jefferson County, Wisconsin, and then to Milwaukee, Wisconsin, where he worked in the banking industry. He was elected city treasurer and then the city comptroller for the city of Milwaukee. In 1857–1858, he served on the Milwaukee Common Council. From 1874 to 1878, Kuehn served as Wisconsin State Treasurer.

Party political offices
Preceded by Anton Klaus	Democratic nominee for State Treasurer of Wisconsin; 1873, 1875	Succeeded by John Ringle
Political offices
Preceded by Henry Baetz	State Treasurer of Wisconsin; January 5, 1874 – January 7, 1878	Succeeded by Richard Guenther
