= Harshaw, Wisconsin =

- Unincorporated community
- Location within Wisconsin Location within the United States
- Coordinates: 45°39′56″N 89°39′20″W
- Country: United States
- State: Wisconsin
- County: Oneida
- Elevation: 1,506 ft (459 m)
- Time zone: UTC-6 (Central (CST))
  - Summer (DST): UTC-5 (CDT)
- ZIP code: 54529
- Area codes: 715 & 534
- GNIS feature ID: 1566101

Harshaw is an unincorporated community located in Oneida County, Wisconsin, United States. Harshaw is 13 miles (21 km) west-northwest of Rhinelander, in the town of Cassian. Harshaw has a post office with ZIP code 54529. The community was named after Henry B. Harshaw, who was the treasurer of Wisconsin when Charles Norway established the post office in March 1851. The population in zip code 54529 is 1,167.

== Notable people ==
- Mike Webster, Hall of Fame NFL center for Pittsburgh Steelers
