= John J. Kempf =

American businessman and politician from Wisconsin (born 1857)

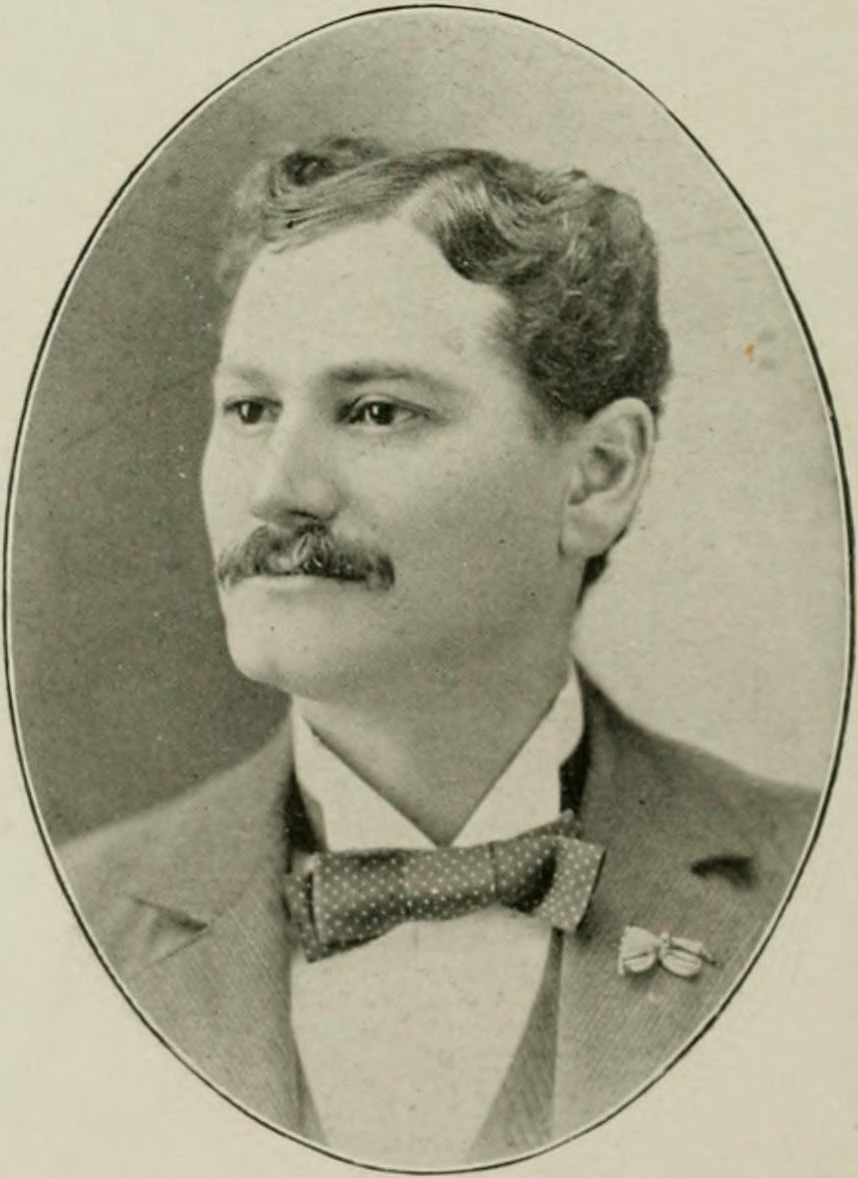
- From Notable Men of Wisconsin (1902)

14th & 16th Treasurer of Wisconsin
- In office January 2, 1905 – January 7, 1907
- Governor: Robert M. La Follette; James O. Davidson
- Preceded by: Thomas M. Purtell
- Succeeded by: Andrew H. Dahl
- In office January 5, 1903 – July 30, 1904
- Governor: Robert M. La Follette
- Preceded by: James O. Davidson
- Succeeded by: Thomas M. Purtell

Member of the Wisconsin Senate from the 4th district
- In office January 7, 1889 – January 2, 1893
- Preceded by: Joseph W. Hoyt
- Succeeded by: James W. Murphy

Personal details
- Born: May 4, 1857 Granville, Wisconsin, U.S.
- Died: After 1930
- Party: Republican
- Spouses: first wife (m. 1879; div. 1919); Mary (died 1934)
- Occupation: Shoemaker

John J. Kempf (May 4, 1857 – ??) was an American shoemaker, businessman, and politician. He was the 14th and 16th state treasurer of Wisconsin—he was removed from office by the governor in 1904 during his first term and then won election to return to office later that year. He also served in the Wisconsin State Senate, representing the north side of the city of Milwaukee.

== Biography ==
Kempf was born on May 4, 1857, in Granville, Wisconsin. He attended Spencerian Business College.

== Career ==
Kempf served as a Milwaukee alderman from 1887 to 1888. He was a member of the Wisconsin State Senate and the Register of Deeds of Milwaukee County before serving as Treasurer of Wisconsin from 1903 to 1904 and again from 1905 to 1907. Additionally, he was a member of the Republican State Central Committee from 1900 to 1903. On August 30, 1904, the Governor of Wisconsin Robert M. La Follette removed Kempf from office and appointed Thomas M. Purtell acting treasurer.

== Electoral history ==
=== Wisconsin State Senate (1888) ===
Wisconsin Senate, 4th District Election, 1888
Party	Candidate	Votes	%	±%
General Election, November 6, 1888
Republican	John J. Kempf	5,262	51.51%	−2.18%
Democratic	August Rebhahn	3,631	35.54%	−8.14%
Labor	Theodore Fritz	1,301	12.73%	
Prohibition	Bierney Hand	22	0.22%	
Plurality		1,631	15.97%	+5.96%
Total votes		10,216	100.0%	+26.97%
Republican hold				

=== Wisconsin State Treasurer (1902, 1904) ===
Wisconsin State Treasurer Election, 1902
Party	Candidate	Votes	%	±%
General Election, November 4, 1902
Republican	John J. Kempf	193,697	54.40%	−5.40%
Democratic	Ed L. Luckow	134,343	37.73%	+1.40%
Social Democratic	Henry J. Ammann	17,389	4.88%	+3.37%
Prohibition	Henry A. Russell	9,725	2.73%	
Socialist Labor	N. E. Hanson	906	0.25%	+0.14%
Plurality		59,354	16.67%	-6.80%
Total votes		356,060	100.0%	-19.26%
Republican hold				

Wisconsin State Treasurer Election, 1904
Party	Candidate	Votes	%	±%
General Election, November 8, 1904
Republican	John J. Kempf	238,759	53.71%	−0.69%
Democratic	Andrew Jenson	155,340	34.94%	−2.79%
Prohibition	John A. Berg	19,061	4.29%	+1.56%
Social Democratic	Henry Luther	17,945	4.04%	−0.85%
National Republican	Gustav Wollaeger Jr.	13,219	2.97%	
Socialist Labor	Henry D. Puck	219	0.05%	−0.21%
Plurality		83,419	18.77%	+2.10%
Total votes		444,543	100.0%	+24.85%
Republican hold				

Party political offices
Preceded by James O. Davidson	Republican nominee for State Treasurer of Wisconsin; 1902, 1904	Succeeded by Andrew H. Dahl
Wisconsin Senate
Preceded by Joseph W. Hoyt	Member of the Wisconsin Senate from the 4th district January 7, 1889 – January 2, 1893	Succeeded by James W. Murphy
Political offices
Preceded by James O. Davidson	State Treasurer of Wisconsin; January 5, 1903 – July 30, 1904	Succeeded by Thomas M. Purtell
Preceded by Thomas M. Purtell	State Treasurer of Wisconsin; January 2, 1905 – January 7, 1907	Succeeded by Andrew H. Dahl
