= James O. Davidson =

American politician (1854–1922)

James Ole Davidson
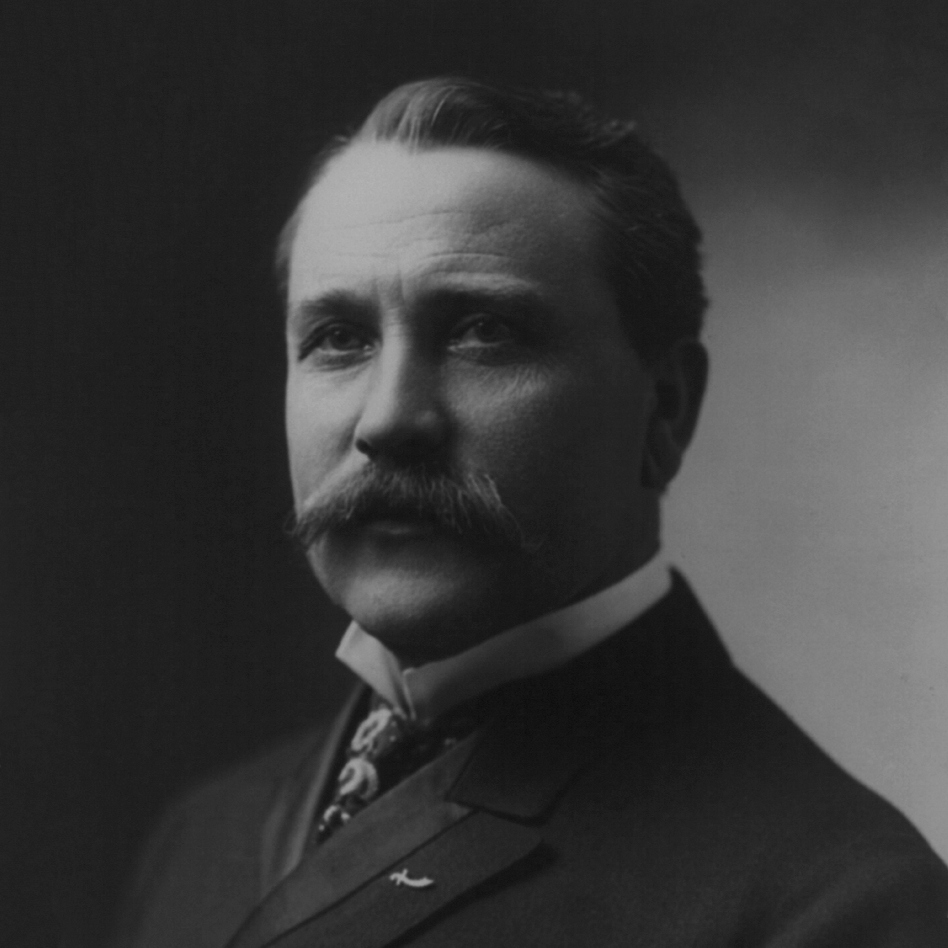

21st Governor of Wisconsin
- In office January 1, 1906 – January 2, 1911; Acting: January 1 1906 – January 7, 1907
- Lieutenant: William D. Connor; John Strange
- Preceded by: Robert M. La Follette
- Succeeded by: Francis E. McGovern

19th Lieutenant Governor of Wisconsin
- In office January 5, 1903 – January 1, 1906
- Governor: Robert M. La Follette
- Preceded by: Jesse Stone
- Succeeded by: William D. Connor

13th Treasurer of Wisconsin
- In office January 2, 1899 – January 5, 1903
- Governor: Edward Scofield; Robert M. LaFollette
- Preceded by: Sewell A. Peterson
- Succeeded by: John J. Kempf

Member of the Wisconsin State Assembly from the Crawford County district
- In office January 2, 1893 – January 2, 1899
- Preceded by: Ambrose Thompson
- Succeeded by: Hugh Porter

Personal details
- Born: February 10, 1854 Aardal Municipality, Nordre Bergenhus County, Norway
- Died: December 16, 1922 (aged 68) Madison, Wisconsin, U.S.
- Resting place: Forest Hill Cemetery, Madison, Wisconsin
- Party: Republican
- Spouse: Helen Bliss
- Children: 2

James Ole Davidson (February 10, 1854 – December 16, 1922) was a Norwegian American immigrant, tailor, merchant, and progressive Republican politician from Crawford County, Wisconsin. He was the 21st governor of Wisconsin, serving from 1906 to 1911; he was initially elected as lieutenant governor under governor Robert M. La Follette, and ascended to the gubernatorial office after La Follette resigned, but then won two full terms as governor in the 1906 and 1908 elections.

Before becoming lieutenant governor, Davidson served as the 13th state treasurer of Wisconsin from 1899 to 1903, and represented Crawford County in the Wisconsin State Assembly from 1893 to 1899.

== Early life ==
Davidson was born in Aardal Municipality (later spelled Årdal) in Nordre Bergenhus County, Norway, and emigrated in 1872 to the United States when he was 18 years old. In Boscobel, Wisconsin he worked as a farmhand and as a tailor. Davidson began a successful mercantile business and established his own tailor business in Soldiers Grove, Wisconsin.

== Political career ==
He held several political positions in Wisconsin, and was twice elected village president in Soldiers Grove. Davidson was also elected as a Republican candidate to the Wisconsin State Assembly, serving three terms from 1893 to 1899. He was elected Wisconsin state treasurer in 1898 and 1900.

In 1902, Davidson was elected the 19th Lieutenant Governor of Wisconsin alongside governor Robert M. "Fighting Bob" La Follette. Davidson and La Follette were re-elected in 1904, and in early 1905 La Follette was elected United States senator. La Follette delayed accepting the new office, overseeing a productive session of progressive legislation in the 47th Wisconsin Legislature before resigning on January 1, 1906. At that time, Davidson ascended to the office and became the 21st governor of Wisconsin. He was then elected governor in 1906 and reelected in 1908. He served from January 4, 1906, to January 3, 1911; and during his tenure, state regulation of the railroads was extended to include public utilities, telegraph, telephone, electricity, water companies, and the insurance industry. After retiring from office, he was appointed by his gubernatorial successor to a five-year term as president of the State Board of Control.

== Death ==
Davidson died in Madison, Wisconsin, on December 16, 1922, due to pneumonia and heart complications. He is interred at Madison's historic Forest Hill Cemetery.

== Family life ==
Davidson was the son of Ole Davidson and Ingabor (Jenson) Davidson. On February 19, 1883, Davidson married Helen Bliss and they had two daughters, Mabel Elsie and Grace.

== See also ==
- List of United States governors born outside the United States

Party political offices
Preceded by Sewell A. Peterson	Republican nominee for State Treasurer of Wisconsin; 1898, 1900	Succeeded by John J. Kempf
Preceded by Jesse Stone	Republican nominee for Lieutenant Governor of Wisconsin; 1902, 1904	Succeeded by William D. Connor
Preceded by Robert M. La Follette	Republican nominee for Governor of Wisconsin; 1906, 1908	Succeeded by Francis E. McGovern
Political offices
Preceded by Sewell A. Peterson	State Treasurer of Wisconsin; January 2, 1899 – January 5, 1903	Succeeded by John J. Kempf
Preceded by Jesse Stone	Lieutenant Governor of Wisconsin; January 5, 1903 – January 1, 1906	Succeeded by William D. Connor
Preceded by Robert M. La Follette	Governor of Wisconsin; January 1, 1906 – January 2, 1911	Succeeded by Francis E. McGovern
