= Warren R. Smith =

American politician (1889–1957)

25th Treasurer of Wisconsin
- In office January 3, 1949 – December 4, 1957
- Governor: Oscar Rennebohm; Walter J. Kohler Jr. Vernon Wallace Thomson
- Preceded by: Clyde M. Johnston
- Succeeded by: Dena A. Smith

Personal details
- Born: Warren Robert Murphy; July 20, 1888 Oconto, Wisconsin, U.S.
- Died: December 4, 1957 (aged 68) Madison, Wisconsin, U.S.
- Resting place: Milwaukee, Wisconsin, U.S.
- Party: Republican
- Spouse: Dena A. Smith
- Education: Marquette University
- Occupation: Politician

Warren Robert Smith (July 20, 1888 – December 4, 1957) was the State Treasurer of Wisconsin from 1947 until his death in office.

== Early life and education ==
Smith was born in Oconto, Wisconsin, or Marinette, Wisconsin, the son of John P. Murphy and Katherine (née Farrell, 1868–1932). His mother later married James P. Smith (1857–1924); Warren is listed as "Warren R. Murphy, step-son" in the 1900 census, and as "Warren R. Smith, step-son" in the 1910 census. He attended Oshkosh State College and Marquette University.

== Career ==
Smith taught school and also worked as a real estate broker, grocer, building manager, accountant, and auditor. He was elected state treasurer of Wisconsin in 1946 and served until his death in Madison on December 4, 1957, from complications of a stroke. He was a Republican. He was buried at Wanderer's Rest Cemetery (a.k.a. Lincoln Memorial Cemetery) in Milwaukee. His wife Dena A. Smith was appointed to succeed him.

== Notes ==
Party political offices
Preceded by John M. Smith	Republican nominee for State Treasurer of Wisconsin; 1948, 1950, 1952, 1954, 1956	Succeeded by Dena A. Smith
Political offices
Preceded by Clyde M. Johnston	Treasurer of Wisconsin; 1949–1957	Succeeded by Dena A. Smith
