= Andrew H. Dahl =

American politician

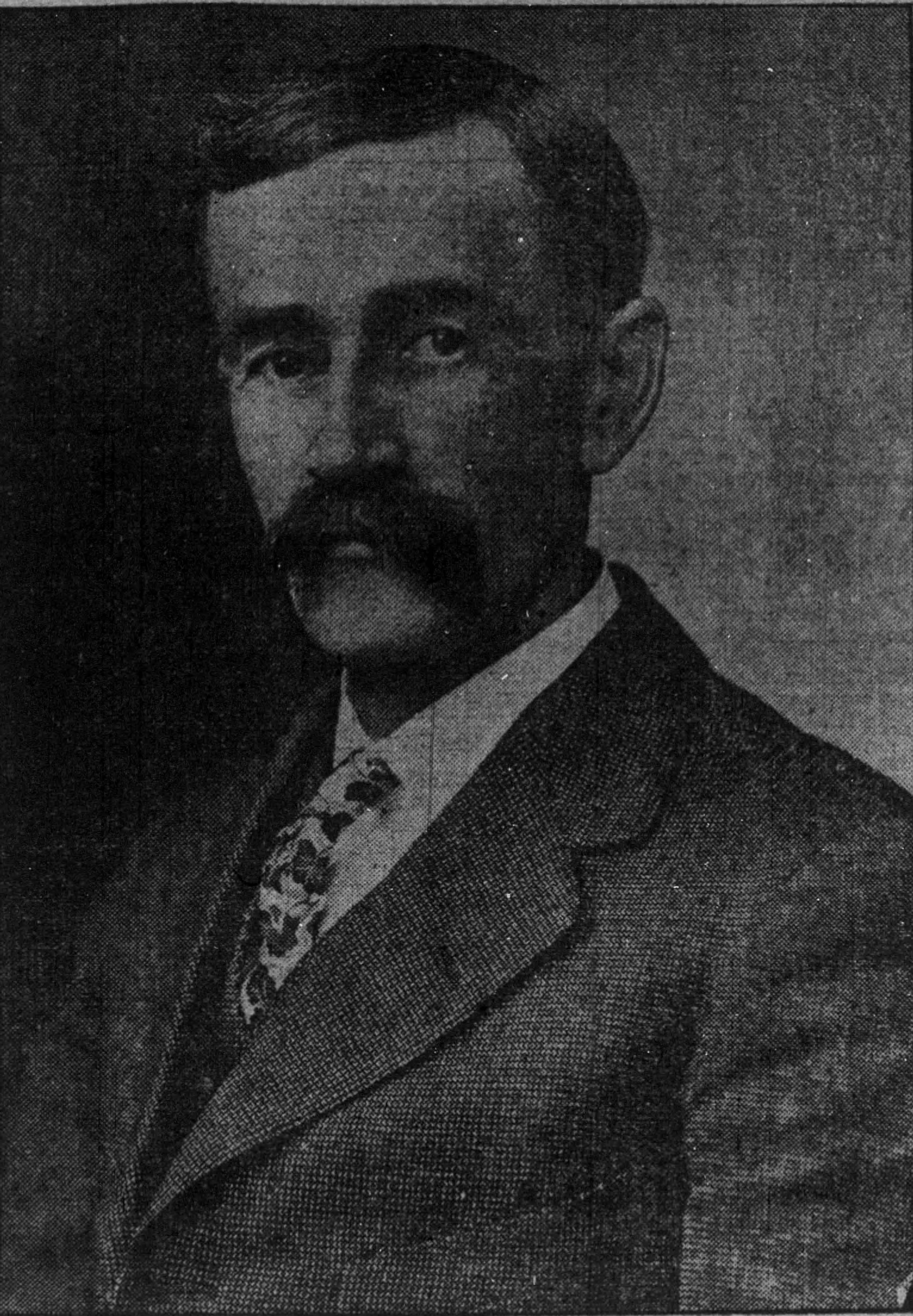
- Dahl c. 1914

17th treasurer of Wisconsin
- In office January 7, 1907 – January 6, 1913
- Preceded by: John J. Kempf
- Succeeded by: Henry Johnson

Member of the Wisconsin State Assembly from Vernon County
- In office January 1899 – January 1907

Personal details
- Born: April 13, 1859 Lewiston, Columbia County, Wisconsin
- Died: January 23, 1928 (aged 68) La Crosse, Wisconsin
- Party: Republican (Progressive faction)
- Spouse: Julia Vinje (m. 1842)

Andrew H. Dahl (April 13, 1859 – January 23, 1928) was a politician in Wisconsin.

Dahl was born in Lewiston, Wisconsin. He attended high school in Viroqua, Wisconsin.

== Career ==
Dahl was supervisor of the village of Westby, Wisconsin, from 1896 to 1897 and was a member of the Wisconsin State Assembly from 1899 to 1907. Additionally, he was the Village President of Westby from 1899 to 1902. He served a Treasurer of Wisconsin from 1907 to 1913. In 1912, he was a delegate to the Republican National Convention that nominated incumbent William Howard Taft for President of the United States, spurring the historic three-way campaign between Taft, former President Theodore Roosevelt and New Jersey Governor Woodrow Wilson with Wilson ultimately winning. He was a supporter of Governor Robert M. La Follette, Sr. and in 1914 ran for the office of Governor of Wisconsin was the Wisconsin Progressive Party ticket. Dahl died suddenly on January 23, 1928, in La Crosse, Wisconsin.

Party political offices
Preceded by John J. Kempf	Republican nominee for State Treasurer of Wisconsin; 1906, 1908, 1910	Succeeded by Henry Johnson
Political offices
Preceded by John J. Kempf	Treasurer of Wisconsin; 1907–1913	Succeeded by Henry Johnson
