= Eugene M. Lamb =

American politician

27th Treasurer of Wisconsin
- In office January 5, 1959 – January 2, 1961
- Governor: Gaylord Nelson
- Preceded by: Dena A. Smith
- Succeeded by: Dena A. Smith

Member of the Wisconsin State Assembly from the Milwaukee 9th district
- In office January 3, 1949 – January 3, 1955
- Preceded by: Edward L. Biro
- Succeeded by: Robert L. Schmidt

Personal details
- Born: March 7, 1910 Sheboygan County, Wisconsin, U.S.
- Died: December 1, 1982 (aged 72)
- Party: Democratic
- Occupation: Accountant, businessman, politician

Eugene M. Lamb (March 7, 1910–December 1, 1982) was an American, Democratic politician.

Born in Sheboygan County, Wisconsin, Lamb studied business and accounting, and worked at Allis-Chalmers Manufacturing Company. He served in the Wisconsin State Assembly in 1949, 1951, and 1953. He was a Democrat. Lamb served as Wisconsin State Treasurer 1959–1961.

== Notes ==
Party political offices
Preceded by William S. Clark	Democratic nominee for Treasurer of Wisconsin; 1958, 1960	Succeeded by John Schneider Jr.
Preceded by John Schneider Jr.	Democratic nominee for Treasurer of Wisconsin; 1964, 1966	Succeeded by Charles P. Smith
Political offices
Preceded by Dena A. Smith	Treasurer of Wisconsin; 1959–1961	Succeeded by Dena A. Smith
