= 1908 Wisconsin gubernatorial election =

- November 3, 1908
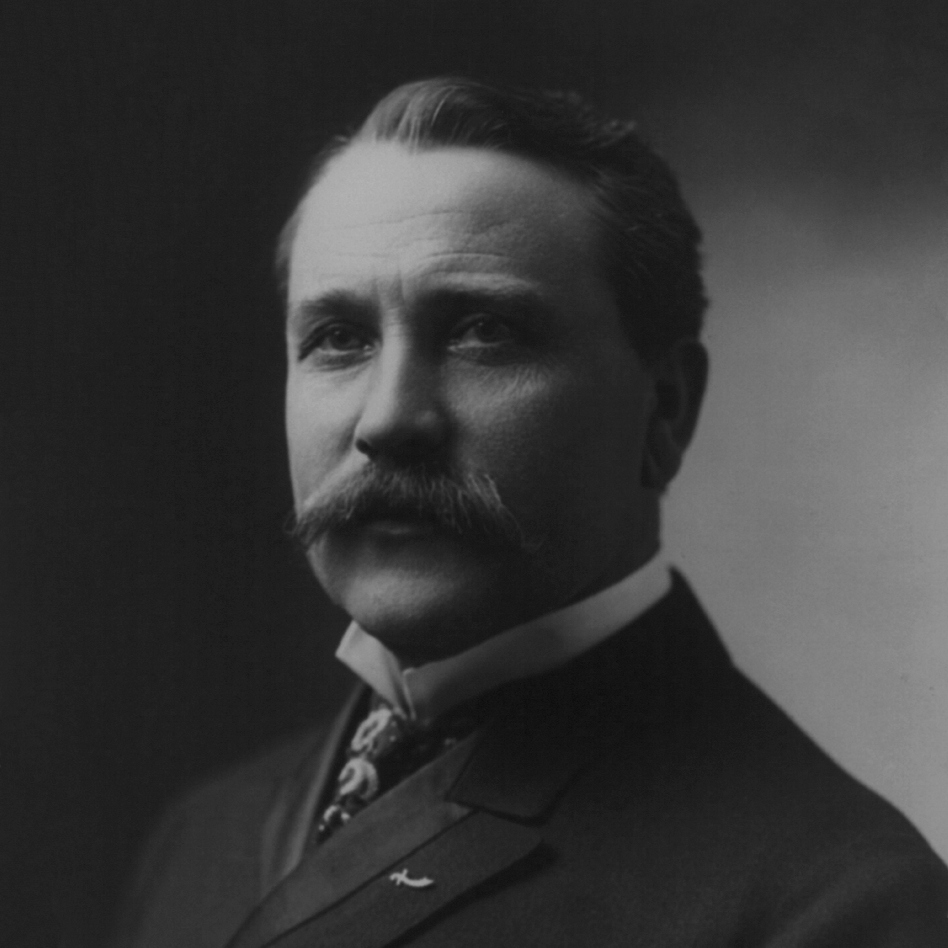

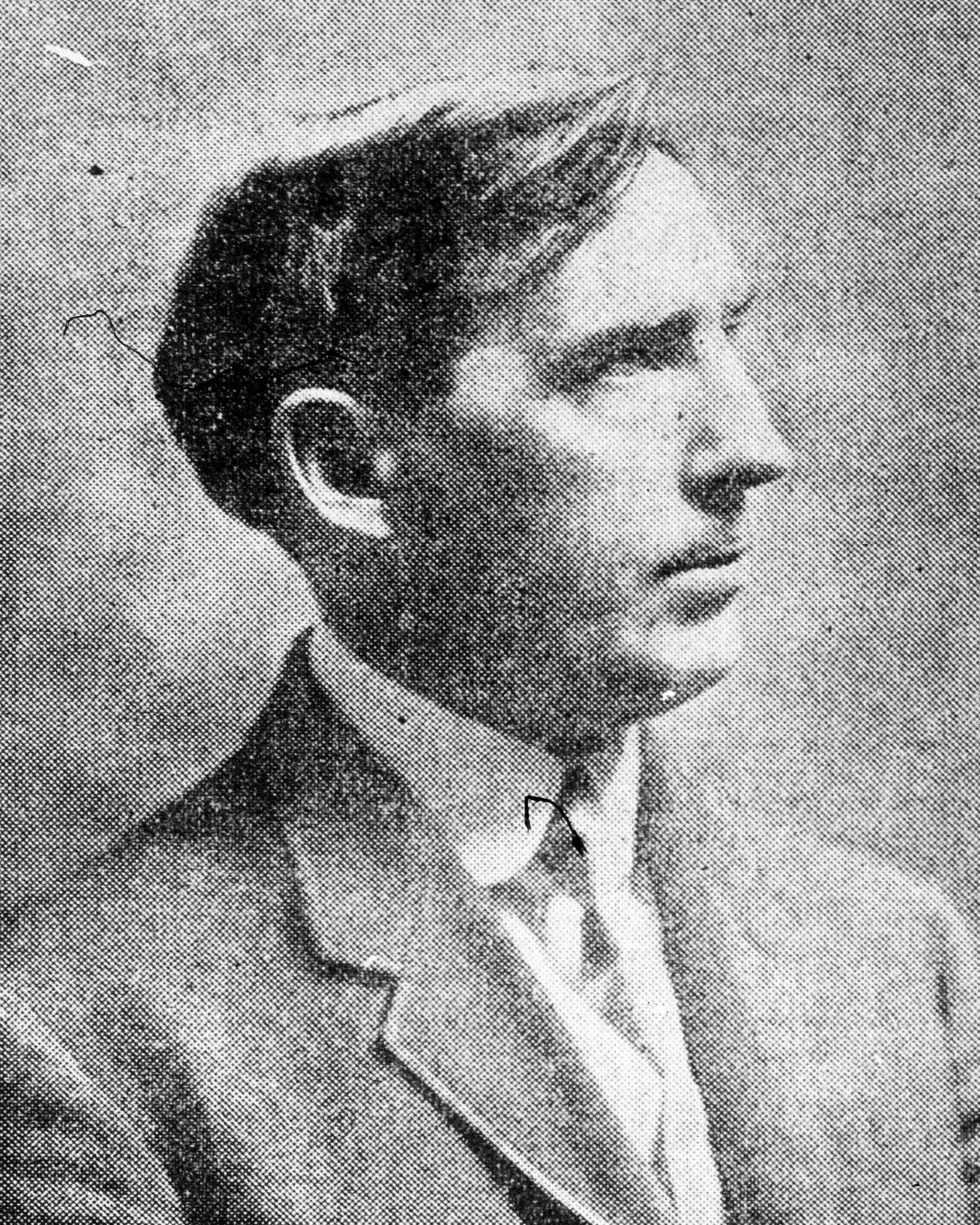

Nominee	James O. Davidson	John A. Aylward	Harvey Dee Brown
Party	Republican	Democratic	Social-Democratic
Popular vote	242,935	165,977	28,583
Percentage	54.03%	36.91%	6.36%
- County results Davidson: 40–50% 50–60% 60–70% 70–80% 80–90% Aylward: 30–40% 40–50% 50–60% 60–70%
Governor before election
James O. Davidson
Republican
Elected Governor
James O. Davidson
Republican

The 1908 Wisconsin gubernatorial election was held on November 3, 1908. Primary elections were held on September 1, 1908.

Incumbent Republican Governor James O. Davidson won re-election, defeating Democratic nominee John A. Aylward and Social Democratic nominee Harvey Dee Brown, with 54.03% of the vote.

== Primary election ==
=== Republican party ===
==== Candidates ====
- James O. Davidson, incumbent Governor

==== Results ====
Republican primary results
Party	Candidate	Votes	%
Republican	James O. Davidson (incumbent)	158,867	99.12%
Republican	Scattering	1,406	0.88%
Total votes		160,273	100.00%

=== Democratic party ===
==== Candidates ====
- John A. Aylward, Democratic nominee for Governor in 1906
- Adolph J. Schmitz, lawyer, Democratic nominee for Lieutenant Governor in 1894

==== Results ====
Democratic primary results
Party	Candidate	Votes	%
Democratic	John A. Aylward	25,273	61.47%
Democratic	Adolph J. Schmitz	15,813	38.46%
Democratic	Scattering	28	0.07%
Total votes		41,114	100.00%

=== Social-Democratic party ===
==== Candidates ====
- Harvey Dee Brown, preacher

==== Results ====
Social-Democratic primary results
Party	Candidate	Votes	%
Social-Democratic	Harvey Dee Brown	4,071	100.00%
Total votes		4,071	100.00%

=== Prohibition party ===
==== Candidates ====
- Winfred Douglas Cox, Prohibition nominee for Wisconsin's 5th congressional district in 1900 and 1902

==== Results ====
Prohibition primary results
Party	Candidate	Votes	%
Prohibition	Winfred Douglas Cox	1,941	100.00%
Total votes		1,941	100.00%

== General election ==
=== Results ===
1908 Wisconsin gubernatorial election (Note: One must exercise caution using the Blue Book as a source for Wisconsin election data for the period of 1890-1920 as it was unreliable during this period. In this case, the Blue Book's totals for Davidson, Cox, Bottema, and Scattering are incorrect and it also contains numerous mistakes in the county figures.)
Party	Candidate	Votes	%	±%
Republican	James O. Davidson (incumbent)	242,935	54.03%	−3.33%
Democratic	John A. Aylward	165,977	36.91%	+4.63%
Social Democratic	Harvey Dee Brown	28,583	6.36%	−1.28%
Prohibition	Winfred D. Cox	11,760	2.62%	+0.05%
Socialist Labor	Herman Bottema	393	0.09%	−0.05%
	Scattering	8	0.00%	
Majority		76,958	17.11%	
Turnout		449,656	100.00%	
Republican hold		Swing	-7.96%	

=== Results by county ===
County	James O. Davidson Republican		John A. Aylward Democratic		Harvey Dee Brown Social-Democratic		Winfred D. Cox Prohibition		Herman Bottema Socialist Labor		Margin		Total votes cast
County	#	%	#	%	#	%	#	%	#	%	#	%	Total votes cast
Adams	1,186	71.23%	402	24.14%	21	1.26%	55	3.30%	1	0.06%	784	47.09%	1,665
Ashland	2,211	54.15%	1,563	38.28%	204	5.00%	104	2.55%	1	0.02%	648	15.87%	4,083
Barron	3,434	71.33%	992	20.61%	118	2.45%	263	5.46%	7	0.15%	2,442	50.73%	4,814
Bayfield	1,985	72.95%	500	18.38%	162	5.95%	70	2.57%	4	0.15%	1,485	54.58%	2,721
Brown	4,944	56.01%	3,249	36.81%	485	5.49%	139	1.57%	10	0.11%	1,695	19.20%	8,827
Buffalo	1,933	64.56%	982	32.80%	20	0.67%	59	1.97%	0	0.00%	951	31.76%	2,994
Burnett	1,268	78.86%	201	12.50%	54	3.36%	82	5.10%	3	0.19%	1,067	66.36%	1,608
Calumet	1,567	46.78%	1,676	50.03%	71	2.12%	35	1.04%	1	0.03%	-109	-3.25%	3,350
Chippewa	3,491	59.54%	2,160	36.84%	79	1.35%	133	2.27%	0	0.00%	1,331	22.70%	5,863
Clark	3,477	66.56%	1,503	28.77%	78	1.49%	162	3.10%	4	0.08%	1,974	37.79%	5,224
Columbia	4,046	60.41%	2,341	34.95%	129	1.93%	182	2.72%	0	0.00%	1,705	25.46%	6,698
Crawford	2,014	53.86%	1,602	42.85%	43	1.15%	78	2.09%	2	0.05%	412	11.02%	3,739
Dane	9,341	52.30%	7,815	43.76%	248	1.39%	453	2.54%	3	0.02%	1,526	8.54%	17,860
Dodge	3,762	37.51%	6,033	60.16%	60	0.60%	174	1.73%	0	0.00%	-2,271	-22.64%	10,029
Door	2,481	76.39%	648	19.95%	56	1.72%	56	1.72%	7	0.22%	1,833	56.43%	3,248
Douglas	3,612	57.61%	1,616	25.77%	627	10.00%	280	4.47%	135	2.15%	1,996	31.83%	6,270
Dunn	3,369	78.42%	713	16.60%	105	2.44%	109	2.54%	0	0.00%	2,656	61.82%	4,296
Eau Claire	3,903	64.00%	1,842	30.21%	157	2.57%	194	3.18%	2	0.03%	2,061	33.80%	6,098
Florence	541	81.60%	105	15.84%	4	0.60%	13	1.96%	0	0.00%	436	65.76%	663
Fond du Lac	5,676	50.11%	5,231	46.18%	173	1.53%	245	2.16%	3	0.03%	445	3.93%	11,328
Forest	1,030	73.89%	283	20.30%	42	3.01%	38	2.73%	1	0.07%	747	53.59%	1,394
Grant	4,883	54.60%	3,666	40.99%	88	0.98%	306	3.42%	0	0.00%	1,217	13.61%	8,943
Green	2,429	51.91%	1,915	40.93%	115	2.46%	220	4.70%	0	0.00%	514	10.99%	4,649
Green Lake	2,018	53.86%	1,637	43.69%	29	0.77%	63	1.68%	0	0.00%	381	10.17%	3,747
Iowa	2,933	55.68%	2,076	39.41%	16	0.30%	243	4.61%	0	0.00%	857	16.27%	5,268
Iron	1,118	74.63%	292	19.49%	42	2.80%	45	3.00%	1	0.07%	826	55.14%	1,498
Jackson	2,660	81.22%	520	15.88%	36	1.10%	58	1.77%	1	0.03%	2,140	65.34%	3,275
Jefferson	3,058	38.83%	4,580	58.15%	61	0.77%	176	2.23%	1	0.01%	-1,522	-19.32%	7,876
Juneau	2,498	58.98%	1,625	38.37%	36	0.85%	73	1.72%	3	0.07%	873	20.61%	4,235
Kenosha	3,349	53.69%	2,029	32.53%	630	10.10%	230	3.69%	0	0.00%	1,320	21.16%	6,238
Kewaunee	1,603	47.26%	1,714	50.53%	48	1.42%	27	0.80%	0	0.00%	-111	-3.27%	3,392
La Crosse	4,399	50.73%	3,970	45.78%	103	1.19%	197	2.27%	3	0.03%	429	4.95%	8,672
Lafayette	2,844	56.37%	2,079	41.21%	22	0.44%	99	1.96%	0	0.00%	765	15.16%	5,045 (Note: Includes 1 Scattering vote)
Langlade	1,807	55.24%	1,367	41.79%	27	0.83%	70	2.14%	0	0.00%	440	13.45%	3,271
Lincoln	2,276	53.12%	1,849	43.15%	94	2.19%	66	1.54%	0	0.00%	427	9.96%	4,285
Manitowoc	4,098	45.12%	3,993	43.96%	926	10.19%	63	0.69%	3	0.03%	105	1.16%	9,083
Marathon	5,089	49.42%	4,804	46.65%	255	2.48%	149	1.45%	0	0.00%	285	2.77%	10,297
Marinette	3,477	65.62%	1,451	27.38%	124	2.34%	245	4.62%	2	0.04%	2,026	38.23%	5,299
Marquette	1,521	62.90%	831	34.37%	19	0.79%	46	1.90%	1	0.04%	690	28.54%	2,418
Milwaukee	26,243	35.91%	26,917	36.83%	18,423	25.21%	1,396	1.91%	107	0.15%	-674	-0.92%	73,086
Monroe	3,304	58.75%	2,117	37.64%	95	1.69%	107	1.90%	1	0.02%	1,187	21.11%	5,624
Oconto	2,944	63.24%	1,508	32.40%	101	2.17%	100	2.15%	2	0.04%	1,436	30.85%	4,655
Oneida	1,453	57.57%	684	27.10%	351	13.91%	36	1.43%	0	0.00%	769	30.47%	2,524
Outagamie	4,971	51.46%	4,366	45.20%	110	1.14%	203	2.10%	9	0.09%	605	6.26%	9,659
Ozaukee	1,117	35.87%	1,913	61.43%	58	1.86%	24	0.77%	2	0.06%	-796	-25.56%	3,114
Pepin	995	67.14%	444	29.96%	4	0.27%	39	2.63%	0	0.00%	551	37.18%	1,482
Pierce	2,984	74.60%	837	20.93%	43	1.08%	136	3.40%	0	0.00%	2,147	53.68%	4,000
Polk	3,024	78.34%	570	14.77%	121	3.13%	143	3.70%	2	0.05%	2,454	63.58%	3,860
Portage	3,266	56.33%	2,386	41.15%	46	0.79%	97	1.67%	3	0.05%	880	15.18%	5,798
Price	1,707	65.70%	546	21.02%	260	10.01%	82	3.16%	1	0.04%	1,161	44.69%	2,598 (Note: Includes 2 Scattering votes)
Racine	5,029	48.66%	4,035	39.05%	781	7.56%	485	4.69%	3	0.03%	994	9.62%	10,334
Richland	2,343	53.24%	1,724	39.17%	51	1.16%	280	6.36%	3	0.07%	619	14.06%	4,401
Rock	7,781	67.12%	3,130	27.00%	262	2.26%	402	3.47%	17	0.15%	4,651	40.12%	11,592
Rusk	1,439	71.45%	442	21.95%	84	4.17%	46	2.28%	3	0.15%	997	49.50%	2,014
Sauk	3,788	56.62%	2,536	37.91%	31	0.46%	334	4.99%	1	0.01%	1,252	18.71%	6,690
Sawyer	849	74.28%	260	22.75%	14	1.22%	20	1.75%	0	0.00%	589	51.53%	1,143
Shawano	3,344	64.62%	1,709	33.02%	28	0.54%	94	1.82%	0	0.00%	1,635	31.59%	5,175
Sheboygan	5,833	51.82%	4,486	39.85%	683	6.07%	244	2.17%	10	0.09%	1,347	11.97%	11,256
St. Croix	3,325	64.70%	1,650	32.11%	71	1.38%	92	1.79%	1	0.02%	1,675	32.59%	5,139
Taylor	1,601	61.11%	896	34.20%	86	3.28%	37	1.41%	0	0.00%	705	26.91%	2,620
Trempealeau	3,616	73.81%	1,122	22.90%	28	0.57%	131	2.67%	2	0.04%	2,494	50.91%	4,899
Vernon	4,122	69.82%	1,539	26.07%	42	0.71%	199	3.37%	2	0.03%	2,583	43.75%	5,904
Vilas	794	72.38%	262	23.88%	22	2.01%	19	1.73%	0	0.00%	532	48.50%	1,097
Walworth	4,263	64.51%	1,846	27.94%	70	1.06%	426	6.45%	3	0.05%	2,417	36.58%	6,608
Washburn	1,134	73.54%	318	20.62%	52	3.37%	37	2.40%	1	0.06%	816	52.92%	1,542
Washington	2,491	47.21%	2,667	50.55%	75	1.42%	40	0.76%	0	0.00%	-176	-3.34%	5,276 (Note: Includes 3 Scattering votes)
Waukesha	4,546	54.40%	3,282	39.28%	214	2.56%	312	3.73%	2	0.02%	1,264	15.13%	8,356
Waupaca	4,728	71.55%	1,505	22.78%	142	2.15%	232	3.51%	1	0.02%	3,223	48.77%	6,608
Waushara	2,749	78.79%	515	14.76%	83	2.38%	128	3.67%	14	0.40%	2,234	64.03%	3,489
Winnebago	6,814	52.79%	5,387	41.74%	289	2.24%	414	3.21%	2	0.02%	1,427	11.06%	12,907
Wood	3,007	50.85%	2,523	42.67%	256	4.33%	125	2.11%	2	0.03%	484	8.19%	5,913
Total	242,935	54.03%	165,977	36.91%	28,583	6.36%	11,760	2.62%	393	0.09%	76,958	17.11%	449,656

==== Counties that flipped from Republican to Democratic ====
- Kewaunee
- Milwaukee

== Bibliography ==
- Glashan, Roy R. (1979). American Governors and Gubernatorial Elections, 1775-1978. Meckler Books. ISBN 0-930466-17-9.
- Gubernatorial Elections, 1787-1997. Washington, D.C.: Congressional Quarterly Inc. 1998. ISBN 1-56802-396-0.
- Beck, J. D., ed. (1909). The Blue Book of the state of Wisconsin. Madison, Wisconsin: Democrat Printing Co., State Printer.
