= John M. Smith =

John M. Smith may refer to:

- John M. Smith (politician, born 1872), American businessman and politician.
- John M. C. Smith (1853–1923), American politician
- John Manners Smith (1864–1920), Chief Commissioner of Ajmer-Merwara
- Frederick Smith (Conservative MP) (John Mark Frederick Smith, 1790–1874), British Army general and politician
- John M. Smith (rapist), (1925–1945), war criminal killed in the 1945 Katsuyama killing incident
- John Maynard Smith (1920–2004), British biologist
- John McGarvie Smith (1844–1918), Australian metallurgist
- John Montgomery Smith (1834–1903), American politician
- John Malcolm Smith (1922-1981), American naval aviator and World War II ace
- John M. Smith (bishop) (1935–2019), American Roman Catholic prelate
- John Moyr Smith (1839–1912), British artist

== See also ==
- John Smith (disambiguation)
- Smith (disambiguation)
