= Harold W. Clemens =

American politician

29th Treasurer of Wisconsin
- In office February 21, 1968 – January 4, 1971
- Governor: Warren P. Knowles
- Preceded by: Dena A. Smith
- Succeeded by: Charles P. Smith

Member of the Wisconsin State Assembly from the Waukesha 2nd district
- In office January 7, 1957 – February 21, 1968
- Preceded by: Alfred R. Ludvigsen
- Succeeded by: James C. Delzer

Personal details
- Born: October 21, 1918 Milwaukee, Wisconsin, U.S.
- Died: December 3, 1998 (aged 80)
- Party: Republican

Military service
- Allegiance: United States
- Branch/service: United States Navy
- Battles/wars: World War II

Harold W. Clemens (October 21, 1918 – December 3, 1998) was an American Republican politician from Wisconsin.

Born in Milwaukee, Wisconsin, Clemens served in the United States Navy during World War II. He worked in manufacturing and managed a recreation area. Clemens served in the Wisconsin State Assembly from 1957 until 1968, when he resigned to fill the vacancy in the office of Wisconsin State Treasurer after the death of Dena A. Smith. He was elected to the office in 1968 and served from 1969 until 1971.

== Notes ==
Party political offices
Preceded by Dena A. Smith	Republican nominee for State Treasurer of Wisconsin; 1968, 1970	Succeeded by Nina J. Weir
Preceded by Nina J. Weir	Republican nominee for State Treasurer of Wisconsin; 1978, 1982	Succeeded by William Lorge
Political offices
Preceded by Dena A. Smith	Treasurer of Wisconsin; 1968–1971	Succeeded by Charles P. Smith
