= Solomon Levitan =

American politician

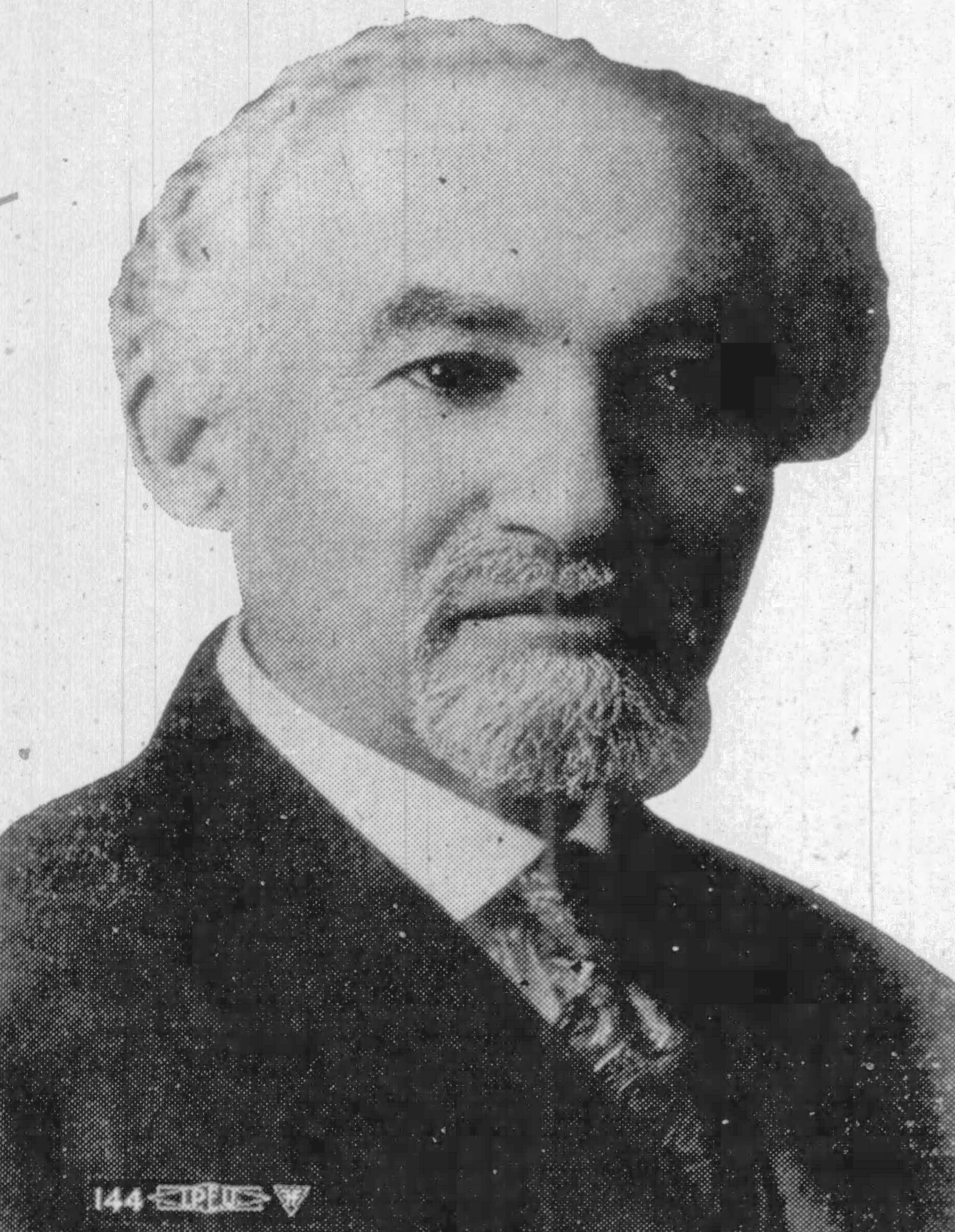

19th & 21st Treasurer of Wisconsin
- In office January 4, 1937 – January 2, 1939
- Governor: Philip La Follette
- Preceded by: Robert Kirkland Henry
- Succeeded by: John M. Smith
- In office January 1, 1923 – January 2, 1933
- Governor: John J. Blaine; Fred R. Zimmerman; Walter J. Kohler Sr. Philip La Follette
- Preceded by: Henry Johnson
- Succeeded by: Robert Kirkland Henry

Personal details
- Born: November 1, 1862 Tauragė, Kovno Governorate, Russian Empire
- Died: February 27, 1940 (aged 77) Madison, Wisconsin, US
- Party: Progressive (1934-1940)
- Other political affiliations: Republican (until 1934)

Solomon Levitan (November 1, 1862 – February 27, 1940) was an American politician of the Republican Party who served as the treasurer of the state of Wisconsin on two occasions, once from 1923 to 1933, and again from 1937 to 1939.

== Biography ==
Levitan was born in Tauroggen, in the Kovno Governorate of the Russian Empire (present-day Lithuania) in 1862. A Jewish man, Levitan moved to Wisconsin and settled in the New Glarus, Wisconsin area in 1881 after antisemitism broke out in his native country. He later moved to Madison, Wisconsin, in 1905. Levitan died in 1940.

== Career ==
Levitan twice ran unsuccessfully for treasurer before being elected in 1922. He served from 1923 to 1933 and again from 1937 to 1939. In 1924, he was delegate to the Republican National Convention. The convention nominated incumbent Calvin Coolidge for President of the United States, who would run against Democratic Party nominee John W. Davis of West Virginia and Progressive Party nominee Robert M. La Follette Sr. of Wisconsin, of whom Levitan had been a long-time supporter.

Party political offices
Preceded by Henry Johnson	Republican nominee for State Treasurer of Wisconsin; 1922, 1924, 1926, 1928, 1930	Succeeded by Edward J. Samp
Preceded by Albert C. Johnson	Progressive nominee for State Treasurer of Wisconsin; 1936, 1938	Succeeded by Frank P. Zeidler
Political offices
Preceded by Henry Johnson	Treasurer of Wisconsin; 1923–1933	Succeeded by Robert K. Henry
Preceded by Robert K. Henry	Treasurer of Wisconsin; 1937–1939	Succeeded by John M. Smith
