= Sewell A. Peterson =

American politician (1850–1915)

Sewell Anton Peterson
- Governor: William H. Upham; Edward Scofield
- Preceded by: John Hunner
- Succeeded by: James O. Davidson

12th treasurer of Wisconsin
- In office 1895–1899

Member of the Wisconsin State Assembly
- In office 1893–1894

Personal details
- Born: February 28, 1850 Norway
- Died: September 20, 1915 (aged 65) Rice Lake, Wisconsin, U.S.
- Resting place: Nora Cemetery, Rice Lake, Wisconsin
- Party: Republican
- Occupation: Politician, merchant

Sewell Anton Peterson (February 28, 1850 – September 20, 1915) was an American politician.

Born in Norway, he settled in Wisconsin in 1861. He was the son of Ole and Martha Peterson. He lived in Menomonie, Wisconsin, where he was a merchant. During that time, Peterson served on the Menomonie Common Council. Then he moved to Rice Lake, Wisconsin, where he served as city clerk, city treasurer, and mayor. In 1893, he served in the Wisconsin State Assembly. From 1895 to 1899, he served as the Wisconsin State Treasurer. He was an alternate delegate to Republican National Convention from Wisconsin in 1900. He died in Rice Lake in 1915 after accidentally shooting himself in the stomach while hunting. He was buried at the Nora Cemetery in Rice Lake, Wisconsin.

== Notes ==
Political offices
Preceded by John Hunner	Treasurer of Wisconsin; 1895–1899	Succeeded by James O. Davidson
