= Charles P. Smith (politician) =

American politician

30th Treasurer of Wisconsin
- In office January 4, 1971 – January 7, 1991
- Governor: Patrick Lucey; Martin J. Schreiber; Lee S. Dreyfus; Anthony Earl; Tommy Thompson
- Preceded by: Harold W. Clemens
- Succeeded by: Cathy Zeuske

Member of the Dane County Board of Supervisors
- In office 1952–1953

Personal details
- Born: June 18, 1926 Chicago, Illinois, U.S.
- Died: July 12, 2014 (aged 88) Madison, Wisconsin, U.S.
- Party: Democratic
- Education: Milton College

Military service
- Branch/service: United States Marine Corps
- Battles/wars: World War II

Charles "Charlie" Philip Smith (June 18, 1926 – July 12, 2014) was an American Democratic politician.

Born in Chicago, Illinois, he lived with his family in Oconto, Wisconsin. In 1940, Smith moved to Madison, Wisconsin, where he graduated from Madison West High School. He served in the United States Marine Corps during World War II. In 1950, he graduated from Milton College and was a company production supervisor. He also worked in the insurance business and for Mobil and Olin Companies. In 1952–1953, Smith served on the Dane County, Wisconsin Board of Supervisors. He then served as Wisconsin State Treasurer from 1971 to 1991. He died in Madison, Wisconsin.

== Notes ==
Party political offices
Preceded by Eugene M. Lamb	Democratic nominee for Treasurer of Wisconsin; 1968, 1970, 1974, 1978, 1982, 1986, 1990	Succeeded by Dismas Becker
Preceded by Harold W. Clemens	State Treasurer of Wisconsin; 1971 – 1991	Succeeded by Cathy Zeuske
