= Henry Johnson (Wisconsin treasurer) =

American farmer, logger, businessman, and politician from Wisconsin

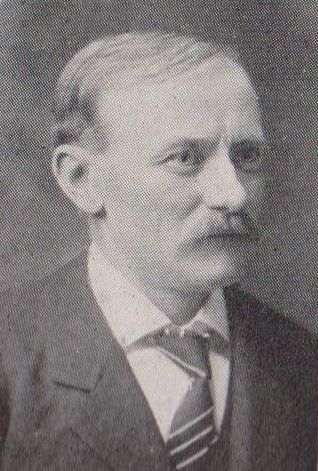

18th Treasurer of Wisconsin
- In office January 6, 1913 – January 1, 1923
- Governor: Francis E. McGovern; Emanuel L. Philipp; John J. Blaine
- Preceded by: Andrew H. Dahl
- Succeeded by: Solomon Levitan

Member of the Wisconsin State Assembly from the Oconto district
- In office January 7, 1901 – January 7, 1907
- Preceded by: Leslie C. Harvey
- Succeeded by: William J. McGee

Personal details
- Born: December 2, 1854 Ammendrup, Zealand, Denmark
- Died: March 5, 1941 (aged 86) Madison, Wisconsin, U.S.
- Resting place: Pleasant Hill Cemetery, Suring, Wisconsin
- Party: Republican
- Spouse: Augusta Ernestina Dieck (m. 1879; died 1924)
- Occupation: Farmer, logger, businessman, and politician

Henry Johnson (December 2, 1854 – March 5, 1941) was a Danish American immigrant, farmer, logger, businessman, and Republican politician. He was the 18th State Treasurer of Wisconsin, serving ten years from 1913 to 1923, and earlier served six years as a member of the Wisconsin State Assembly, representing Oconto County.

== Biography ==
Johnson was born at Amendrup near Præstø, Denmark, on December 2, 1854. In 1873 he moved to Oshkosh, Wisconsin, where he remained until 1879. He then bought land in the town of How, Wisconsin, to which he moved and engaged in farming and logging. He also operated a warehouse and real estate business in the nearby village of Suring. He was the chairman of the town board and town treasurer for a number of years. He married Augusta Ernestina Dieck (1858–1924) on June 18, 1879.

Johnson died on March 5, 1941, in Madison, Wisconsin.

Party political offices
Preceded by Andrew H. Dahl	Republican nominee for State Treasurer of Wisconsin; 1912, 1914, 1916, 1918, 1920	Succeeded by Solomon Levitan
Wisconsin State Assembly
Preceded by Leslie C. Harvey	Member of the Wisconsin State Assembly from the Oconto district January 7, 1901 – January 7, 1907	Succeeded by William J. McGee
Political offices
Preceded by Andrew H. Dahl	State Treasurer of Wisconsin; January 6, 1913 – January 1, 1923	Succeeded by Solomon Levitan
