= John Hunner =

American journalist

11th Treasurer of Wisconsin
- In office January 5, 1891 – January 7, 1895
- Governor: George Wilbur Peck
- Preceded by: Henry B. Harshaw
- Succeeded by: Sewell A. Peterson

Personal details
- Born: November 12, 1844 Buffalo, New York, U.S.
- Died: May 19, 1918 (aged 73) Baltimore, Maryland, U.S.
- Resting place: Lakeview Cemetery, Eau Claire, Wisconsin, U.S.
- Party: Democratic
- Profession: Politician, journalist

John Hunner (November 12, 1844 – May 19, 1918) was an American politician.

Born in Buffalo, New York, he moved to Alma, Wisconsin, in 1860, where he was editor of the local paper and became the first president of the village of Alma. After the Civil War, Hunner moved to Eau Claire, Wisconsin, where he was a grocer and became the editor of the local paper in 1871. He was elected city clerk of Eau Claire. In 1890, Hunner was elected mayor of Eau Claire. He served as State Treasurer of Wisconsin from 1891 to 1895 and was a member of the Democratic Party. He moved to Baltimore in 1917 after suffering a stroke, where he died two years later. His remains were returned to Wisconsin and he was buried at Lakeview Cemetery in Eau Claire.

== Notes ==
Political offices
| Preceded by Henry B. Harshaw | Treasurer of Wisconsin; 1891–1895 | Succeeded by Sewell A. Peterson |
