= Robert Kirkland Henry =

American politician (1890–1946)

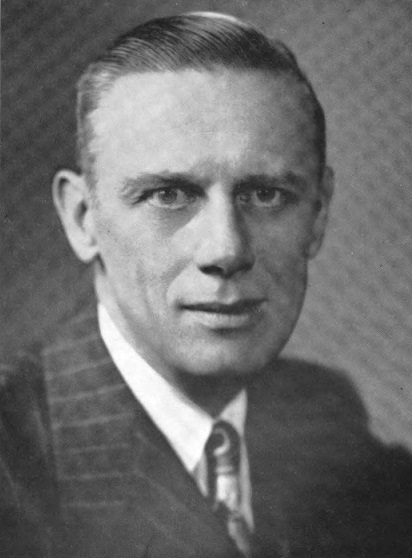

Member of the U.S. House of Representatives from Wisconsin's 2nd district
- In office January 3, 1945 – November 20, 1946
- Preceded by: Harry Sauthoff
- Succeeded by: Glenn Robert Davis

20th Treasurer of Wisconsin
- In office January 2, 1933 – January 4, 1937
- Governor: Albert G. Schmedeman; Philip La Follette
- Preceded by: Solomon Levitan
- Succeeded by: Solomon Levitan

Personal details
- Born: February 9, 1890 Jefferson, Wisconsin, US
- Died: November 20, 1946 (aged 56) Madison, Wisconsin, US
- Resting place: Greenwood Cemetery, Jefferson, Wisconsin
- Party: Republican (after 1938); Democratic (before 1938)
- Spouse: Claire Stevens (m. 1911–1946)

Robert Kirkland Henry (February 9, 1890 – November 20, 1946) was an American banker and politician from Jefferson County, Wisconsin. He served the last two years of his life as a member of the U.S. House of Representatives, representing Wisconsin's 2nd congressional district from 1945 until his death in 1946. He served in Congress as a Republican and previously ran unsuccessfully for the Republican nomination for governor of Wisconsin in 1938, but earlier he had been a member of the Democratic Party, and had been elected to two terms as state treasurer of Wisconsin as a Democrat (1933–1937).

== Biography ==
Henry was born in Jefferson, Wisconsin, on February 9, 1890. He attended the University of Wisconsin–Madison for two years, and then began a career in banking. He rose through the ranks of the Jefferson County Bank to become a cashier and a member of the board of directors.

In 1932 he was the successful Democratic nominee for State Treasurer, and he served two terms, 1933 to 1937. He was an unsuccessful candidate for reelection in 1936.

In 1938 he ran for the Republican nomination for Governor of Wisconsin, and lost to Julius Heil, who went on to defeat Philip La Follette, the Wisconsin Progressive Party nominee in the general election.

Henry served on the Jefferson Municipal Water and Light Commission from 1939 to 1944. From 1940 to 1944 he was a member of the State Banking Commission 1940-1944.

He was elected to Congress in 1944 and re-elected in 1946. He served in the 79th Congress, but died before the start of the 80th Congress.

Henry died in Madison, Wisconsin, on November 20, 1946. He was buried at Greenwood Cemetery in Jefferson.

== See also ==
- List of members of the United States Congress who died in office (1900–1949)

Party political offices
Preceded by Frank J. Grutza	Democratic nominee for Treasurer of Wisconsin; 1928	Succeeded by Christian Hoen
Preceded by Christian Hoen	Democratic nominee for Treasurer of Wisconsin; 1932, 1934, 1936	Succeeded by Michael J. Cepress
Preceded by Arthur W. Lueck	Democratic nominee for Governor of Wisconsin; Withdrew; 1938	Succeeded by Harry W. Bolens
Political offices
Preceded by Solomon Levitan	Treasurer of Wisconsin; 1933–1937	Succeeded by Solomon Levitan
U.S. House of Representatives
Preceded by Harry Sauthoff	Member of the U.S. House of Representatives from Wisconsin's 2nd congressional district 1945-1946	Succeeded by Glenn Robert Davis
