= Richard W. Guenther =

19th century American politician

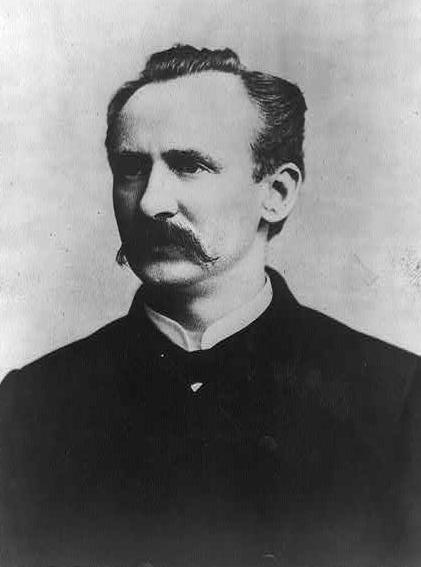

Member of the U.S. House of Representatives from Wisconsin
- In office March 4, 1881 – March 3, 1889
- Preceded by: Gabriel Bouck (6th); Edward S. Bragg (2nd)
- Succeeded by: Charles B. Clark (6th); Charles Barwig (2nd)
- Constituency: 6th district (1881-87); 2nd district (1887-89)

8th State Treasurer of Wisconsin
- In office January 7, 1878 – January 2, 1882
- Governor: William E. Smith
- Preceded by: Ferdinand Kuehn
- Succeeded by: Edward C. McFetridge

Personal details
- Born: November 30, 1845 Potsdam, Brandenburg, Kingdom of Prussia
- Died: April 5, 1913 (aged 67) Oshkosh, Wisconsin, U.S.
- Resting place: Riverside Cemetery, Oshkosh, Wisconsin
- Party: Republican
- Spouse: Emilie Schloerb (m. 1870–1913)
- Children: Richard Guenther^{(b. 1872; died 1921)}; Meta Guenther^{(b. 1873; died 1879)}; Alice Lillian (Motz)^{(b. 1876; died 1962)}; Otto Guenther^{(b. 1877; died 1878)}
- Profession: Pharmacist, Politician

Richard William Guenther (November 30, 1845 – April 5, 1913) was a German American immigrant, pharmacist, and Republican politician from Oshkosh, Wisconsin. He served eight years in the U.S. House of Representatives, representing central Wisconsin from 1881 to 1889. Before that, he served as the 8th State Treasurer of Wisconsin. Later in life, he served as an American consul general in Mexico City, Frankfurt, Germany, and Cape Town, South Africa.

== Early life and education ==
Richard Guenther was born November 30, 1845, in the city of Potsdam, in what was then the Province of Brandenburg, in the Kingdom of Prussia (now Germany). He was raised and educated in the schools of Potsdam, then attended the Royal Pharmacy, where he studied chemistry and pharmacy.

While studying at the Royal Pharmacy, Guenther planned to join the Prussian Army, but he was badly burned in a lab explosion before his final exams. After being declared unfit for service in the Prussian Army, Guenther decided to emigrate to the United States.

== Arrival in America ==
He initially settled in New York City, in January 1867. There he partnered with fellow pharmacist Robert Wood Johnson in establishing a plaster business, which ultimately grew into the conglomerate Johnson & Johnson. Guenther only remained in the partnership for a few months, however, determining that he would continue traveling into the west. He left for the new state of Wisconsin in the fall of 1867, settling briefly in Fond du Lac, Wisconsin, before moving to the nearby city of Oshkosh, which became his home for the rest of his life.

At Oshkosh, Guenther established a drug store which quickly became one of the most prominent businesses in the young city. Guenther also quickly became involved in the local German American immigrant community and became a member of the Oshkosh Turnverein (Turners). He obtained his American citizenship in December 1873, and was elected to his first public office the next year; he was elected to the Oshkosh school commission in 1874 and was re-elected in 1875, 1876, and 1877. Through his growing role in local politics, Guenther also became active in the Republican Party of Wisconsin.

== State treasurer ==
Guenther was first mentioned as a potential candidate for statewide office in 1875, when he was discussed as an alternative for Henry Baetz as a candidate for state treasurer of Wisconsin. At the time, both parties tried to build their statewide tickets with at least one representative of Wisconsin's large German immigrant population.

Guenther's prominence in Wisconsin's German American population continued to grow, as he became president of the Oshkosh Turnverein, and later had Oshkosh established as the state headquarters of the state turnverein organization. Guenther was widely expected to become president of the state turnverein in 1876, but was thwarted at the state convention by Democratic members.

In 1877, Guenther was again discussed as a candidate for state treasurer, as Baetz had lost the 1875 election. At the 1877 Republican state convention in September, Guenther's name was placed in nomination by James H. Foster in a highly complimentary speech. After a brief informal ballot, Guenther was nominated by acclamation. Guenther won the election with 45% of the vote, along with the entire state Republican ticket. Two years later, Guenther was re-elected with nearly 54% of the vote.

== Congress ==
Wisconsin's 6th congressional district 1872–1881

During his time as state treasurer, Guenther's reputation grew beyond the state of Wisconsin, and he accepted invitations from neighboring state Republican organizations to travel and campaign in those states' German American communities. During his third year in office, his name began appearing in newspaper editorials as a potential candidate for U.S. House of Representatives in Wisconsin's 6th congressional district. At the time, the 6th congressional district comprised much of the northeast quadrant of Wisconsin, including Guenther's home county, Winnebago, along with Brown, Door, Kewaunee, Outagamie, Calumet, Green Lake, Waushara, and Waupaca counties. In September 1880, Guenther responded to the talk of a congressional run, stating that he'd be willing to accept the nomination if it were offered to him.

Almost immediately after declaring his willingness to be a candidate for Congress, Democrats in the state began making an issue of Guenther's citizenship status. At the time, the law required two years to lapse between a person's declaration of their intention to become a citizen and their achieving citizenship. An Oshkosh Northwestern article reporting of Guenther's citizenship paperwork appeared to indicate that he had only declared his intention to become a citizen in April 1873, less than a year before he received his citizenship in December of that year. Guenther's allies however, asserted that the newspaper had erred, and that he had actually declared his intention to become a citizen in April 1870.

At the Republican district convention in September 1880, Guenther was nominated on the first ballot without serious opposition. In the general election, he faced the Democratic incumbent, Gabriel Bouck, who was seeking his third term in office. Guenther won the election with 52% of the vote.

He represented Wisconsin's 6th congressional district for three terms (March 4, 1881 – March 3, 1887). After redistricting, he represented Wisconsin's 2nd congressional district for one term (March 4, 1887 – March 3, 1889). Overall, Guenther represented Wisconsin from the 47th through the 50th Congresses.

== Later years ==
Guenther was appointed consul general in three different locations: in Mexico City, Mexico by President Benjamin Harrison in 1890, serving until 1893; in Frankfurt, Germany by President William McKinley in 1898, serving until 1910; and in Cape Town, South Africa by President William Howard Taft in 1910, serving until his death in Oshkosh, Wisconsin, on April 5, 1913. He was interred at Riverside Cemetery in Oshkosh.

== Personal life and legacy ==
Richard Guenther was the youngest of 11 children born to Theodore and Augusta (née Lietze) Guenther. His father was a musician in Potsdam, both parents remained in Germany for their entire lives. Only one of Richard's siblings emigrated to America, his elder brother August, who died at Saint Louis, Missouri, in 1912.

Richard Guenther married Emilie Schloerb in 1870. They had four children together, though two died in childhood. Guenther was survived by his wife, his son Richard Jr., and his daughter Alice.

Guenther was a member of the Congregational church, and was active in the Knights of Honor and the Independent Order of Odd Fellows fraternal organizations.

The Richard Guenther House in Oshkosh, built in 1888, is now listed in the National Register of Historic Places.

== Electoral history ==
=== Wisconsin State Treasurer (1877, 1879) ===
Wisconsin State Treasurer Election, 1877
Party	Candidate	Votes	%	±%
General Election, November 6, 1877
Republican	Richard W. Guenther	81,087	45.65%	–3.52pp
Democratic	John Ringle	68,405	38.51%	–12.31pp
Greenback	William Schwartz	25,387	14.29%	
Socialist Labor	George Kisbert	2,177	1.23%	
Prohibition	Milo J. Althouse	420	0.24%	
	Scattering	137	0.08%	
Plurality		12,682	7.14%	+5.49pp
Total votes		177,613	100.0%	+4.69%
Republican gain from Democratic				

Wisconsin State Treasurer Election, 1879
Party	Candidate	Votes	%	±%
General Election, November 4, 1879
Republican	Richard W. Guenther (incumbent)	101,745	53.85%	+8.20pp
Democratic	Andrew Haben	73,668	38.99%	+0.48pp
Greenback	Peter A. Griffiths	13,022	6.89%	–7.41pp
Prohibition	W. T. Miller	414	0.22%	–0.02pp
	Scattering	114	0.06%	
Plurality		28,077	14.86%	+7.72pp
Total votes		188,943	100.0%	+6.38%
Republican hold				

=== U.S. House, Wisconsin's 6th district (1880, 1882, 1884) ===
Year	Election	Date	Elected				Defeated				Total	Plurality
1880	General	Nov. 2	Richard W. Guenther	Republican	20,168	52.47%	Gabriel Bouck (inc)	Dem.	16,807	43.73%	38,435	3,361
1880	General	Nov. 2	Richard W. Guenther	Republican	20,168	52.47%	L. A. Stewart	Gbk.	1,437	3.74%	38,435	3,361
1882	General	Nov. 6	Richard W. Guenther (inc)	Republican	10,303	44.14%	Andrew Haben	Dem.	9,265	39.69%	23,344	1,038
1882	General	Nov. 6	Richard W. Guenther (inc)	Republican	10,303	44.14%	Theodore D. Kanouse	Proh.	3,275	14.03%	23,344	1,038
1882	General	Nov. 6	Richard W. Guenther (inc)	Republican	10,303	44.14%	L. A. Stewart	Gbk.	496	2.12%	23,344	1,038
1884	General	Nov. 4	Richard W. Guenther (inc)	Republican	16,425	49.92%	Augustus L. Smith	Dem.	15,197	46.19%	32,903	1,228
1884	General	Nov. 4	Richard W. Guenther (inc)	Republican	16,425	49.92%	J. J. Sutton	Proh.	955	2.90%	32,903	1,228
1884	General	Nov. 4	Richard W. Guenther (inc)	Republican	16,425	49.92%	W. E. Hanson	Gbk.	323	0.98%	32,903	1,228

=== U.S. House, Wisconsin's 2nd district (1886) ===
Year	Election	Date	Elected				Defeated				Total	Plurality
1886	General	Nov. 2	Richard W. Guenther	Republican	15,366	55.67%	Arthur K. Delaney	Dem.	11,138	40.36%	27,600	4,228
1886	General	Nov. 2	Richard W. Guenther	Republican	15,366	55.67%	J. L. Ingersoll	Proh.	1,074	3.89%	27,600	4,228

Party political offices
Preceded by Henry Baetz	Republican nominee for State Treasurer of Wisconsin; 1877, 1879	Succeeded by Edward C. McFetridge
U.S. House of Representatives
Preceded by Gabriel Bouck	Member of the U.S. House of Representatives from Wisconsin's 6th congressional district March 4, 1881 – March 3, 1887	Succeeded by Charles B. Clark
Preceded by Edward S. Bragg	Member of the U.S. House of Representatives from Wisconsin's 2nd congressional district March 4, 1887 – March 3, 1889	Succeeded by Charles Barwig
Political offices
Preceded by Ferdinand Kuehn	State Treasurer of Wisconsin; January 7, 1878 – January 2, 1882	Succeeded by Edward C. McFetridge
