= John M. Smith (politician, born 1872) =

American businessman and politician

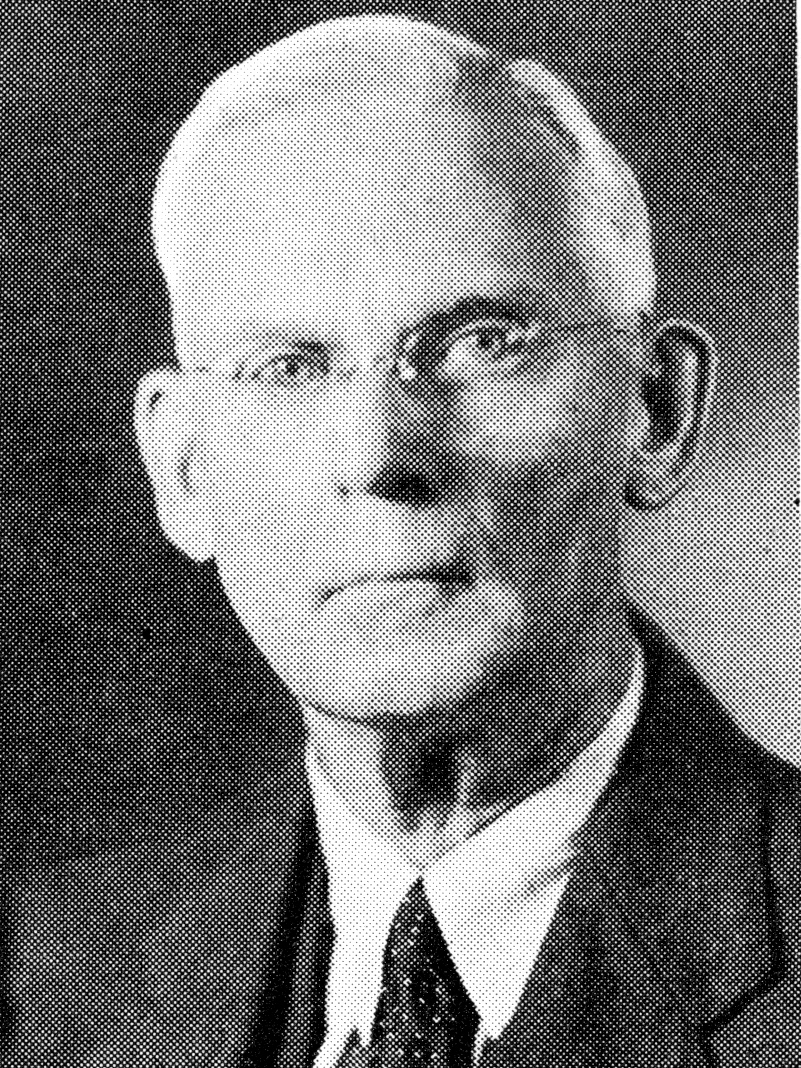
- Smith c. 1940

22nd Treasurer of Wisconsin
- In office January 2, 1939 – August 17, 1947
- Governor: Julius P. Heil; Walter Samuel Goodland; Oscar Rennebohm
- Preceded by: Solomon Levitan
- Succeeded by: John L. Sonderegger

Personal details
- Born: John Melgar Smith; 1872 near Carthage, Illinois, U.S.
- Died: August 17, 1947 (aged 74–75)
- Party: Republican
- Occupation: Politician, businessman

John Melgar Smith (1872 – August 17, 1947) was an American businessman and politician.

Born on a farm near Carthage, Illinois, Smith lived in Minnesota 1891–1895 working as a railroad telegraph operator and station agent. In 1895, he moved to Shell Lake, Wisconsin, where he worked in the cooperative, banking, and lumber industries. In 1938, he was elected State Treasurer, as a Republican, serving until his death on August 17, 1947.

Party political offices
Preceded by John F. Jardine	Republican nominee for State Treasurer of Wisconsin; 1938, 1940, 1942, 1944, 1946	Succeeded by Warren R. Smith
Political offices
Preceded by Solomon Levitan	Treasurer of Wisconsin; 1939–1947	Succeeded by John L. Sonderegger
