= State Treasurer of Wisconsin =

American government office

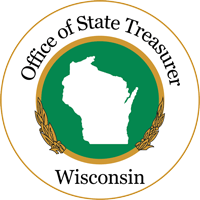
- Seal of the Office of the State Treasurer

- Incumbent; John Leiber since January 3, 2023
- Style: Mister or Madam Treasurer (informal); The Honorable (formal)
- Member of: Board of Commissioners of Public Lands
- Seat: Wisconsin State Capitol; Madison, Wisconsin
- Appointer: General election
- Term length: Four years, no term limits
- Constituting instrument: Wisconsin Constitution of 1848, Article VI
- Inaugural holder: Jairus C. Fairchild
- Formation: June 7, 1848 (178 years ago)
- Salary: $72,551
- Website: Official page

The state treasurer of Wisconsin is a constitutional officer in the executive branch of the government of the U.S. state of Wisconsin. Thirty-six individuals have held the office since statehood. The incumbent is John Leiber, a Republican.

== Election and term of office ==
The state treasurer is elected on Election Day in November, and takes office on the first Monday of the next January. There is no limit to the number of terms a state treasurer may hold. From 1848 to 1968, the state treasurer was elected to a two-year term in the November general election. Since 1970, following ratification of a constitutional amendment in April 1967, the state treasurer has been elected to a four-year term.

In the event of a vacancy in the office of the state treasurer, the governor may appoint a replacement to fill the remainder of the term. The state treasurer may be removed from office through an impeachment trial.

== Powers and duties ==
In Wisconsin, the state treasurer is the chief banker of state government, signing checks, share drafts, and other drafts drawn on state funds by the Department of Administration; this role extends to the State Investment Fund and the Public Employee Trust Fund, which are managed by independent state agencies. The state treasurer also makes certified copies of deeds, bonds, and other documents filed with his or her office and promotes Wisconsin's unclaimed property program. Furthermore, the state treasurer assists in the administration of the County Mining Investment Fund and receives and deposits payments for certain Great Lakes fisheries-related surcharges into the Conservation Fund. Occasional functions performed by the state treasurer include conducting training conferences for municipal clerks and treasurers, approving the amounts and sureties filed with the Department of Administration in connection to the Department of Revenue's receipt of paid income and franchise taxes, and acknowledging the satisfaction and discharge of certain mortgages involving the state.

Aside from the office's functional responsibilities, the state treasurer is a member of the Board of Directors of the Insurance Security Fund and of the Board of Commissioners of Public Lands.

== Reduction of powers and office dissolution attempts ==
Since the 1990s, most duties vested in the state treasurer's office have gradually been eliminated or transferred to other state agencies. 1995 Wisconsin Act 27 eliminated the office's securities section, which had the responsibility of safekeeping securities purchased by the State of Wisconsin Investment Board. 1997 Wisconsin Act 27 transferred the Division of Trust Lands and Investment, which altogether comprises the staff of the Board of Commissioners of Public Lands, to the Wisconsin Department of Administration. Most notably, 2003 Wisconsin Act 33 transferred the cash and debt management functions of the state treasurer's office to the Department of Administration. Moreover, 2011 Wisconsin Act 32 transferred the state's version of a 529 plan, known as EdVest, to the Department of Administration. The same act also transferred the Local Government Investment Pool and corresponding management services functions to the Department of Administration. Later, 2013 Wisconsin Act 20 transferred the state treasurer's Unclaimed Property Program to the Wisconsin Department of Revenue. As a result of these interagency transfers, the office of State Treasurer in Wisconsin is institutionally the weakest directly elected member of the National Association of State Treasurers, according to state-by-state analyses published by the Council of State Governments, and the only state treasurer nationwide not responsible for cash management.

On October 27, 2015, the Wisconsin State Assembly approved an amendment to the Wisconsin Constitution to abolish the state treasurer's office, Assembly Joint Resolution 5 (AJR 5), with 63 "yea" votes and 33 "nay" votes. The Wisconsin State Senate approved AJR 5 on January 20, 2016. The first approval of the amendment was enrolled on March 15, 2016. Because this measure was approved by both chambers of the Wisconsin State Legislature, the Wisconsin Elimination of State Treasurer Amendment was placed on the 2018 spring general election ballot on April 3, 2018. The referendum was defeated, with 62% of voters statewide choosing to retain the office with a "no" vote against amending the constitution to eliminate the office.

== List of state treasurers ==
Number of state treasurers of Wisconsin by party affiliation
Party	Treasurers
Republican	23
Democratic	10
Progressive	1
None	1

This is a list of state treasurers of Wisconsin.

Democratic Republican Progressive

#	Image	State Treasurer	Party	Took office	Left office (Note: When there is no evidence to the contrary, it is assumed that state treasurers left office the same day their successors were sworn in.)
1		Jairus C. Fairchild	Democratic	June 7, 1848	January 5, 1852
2		Edward H. Janssen (Note: Contemporary newspaper accounts indicate that the second state treasurer's surname was "Jansson"; recent editions of the Wisconsin Blue Books, however, list his surname as "Jansen".)	Democratic	January 5, 1852	January 7, 1856
3		Charles Kuehn	Democratic	January 7, 1856	January 4, 1858
4		Samuel D. Hastings	Republican	January 4, 1858	January 1, 1866
5		William E. Smith	Republican	January 1, 1866	January 3, 1870
6		Henry Baetz	Republican	January 3, 1870	January 5, 1874
7		Ferdinand Kuehn	Democratic	January 5, 1874	January 7, 1878
8		Richard Guenther	Republican	January 7, 1878	January 2, 1882
9		Edward C. McFetridge	Republican	January 2, 1882	January 3, 1887
10		Henry B. Harshaw	Republican	January 3, 1887	January 5, 1891
11		John Hunner	Democratic	January 5, 1891	January 7, 1895
12		Sewell A. Peterson	Republican	January 7, 1895	January 2, 1899
13		James O. Davidson	Republican	January 2, 1899	January 5, 1903
14		John J. Kempf (Note: Failed to give the required bond.)	Republican	January 5, 1903	July 30, 1904
15		Thomas M. Purtell (Note: Appointed to fill vacancy.)	Republican	July 30, 1904	January 2, 1905
16		John J. Kempf	Republican	January 2, 1905	January 7, 1907
17		Andrew H. Dahl	Republican	January 7, 1907	January 6, 1913
18		Henry Johnson	Republican	January 6, 1913	January 1, 1923
19		Solomon Levitan	Republican	January 1, 1923	January 2, 1933
20		Robert K. Henry	Democratic	January 2, 1933	January 4, 1937
21		Solomon Levitan	Progressive	January 4, 1937	January 2, 1939
22		John M. Smith (Note: Died in office.)	Republican	January 2, 1939	August 17, 1947
vacant				August 17, 1947	August 19, 1947
23		John L. Sonderegger (Note: Resigned to become state insurance commissioner.)	Republican	August 19, 1947	September 30, 1948
vacant				September 30, 1948	October 1, 1948
24		Clyde M. Johnston (Note: Appointed from staff.)	none	October 1, 1948	January 3, 1949
25		Warren R. Smith	Republican	January 3, 1949	December 4, 1957
vacant				December 4, 1957	December 5, 1957
26		Dena A. Smith	Republican	December 5, 1957	January 5, 1959
27		Eugene M. Lamb	Democratic	January 5, 1959	January 2, 1961
28		Dena A. Smith	Republican	January 2, 1961	February 20, 1968
vacant				February 20, 1968	February 21, 1968
29		Harold W. Clemens	Republican	February 21, 1968	January 4, 1971
30		Charles P. Smith	Democratic	January 4, 1971	January 7, 1991
31		Cathy Zeuske	Republican	January 7, 1991	January 3, 1995
32		Jack Voight	Republican	January 3, 1995	January 3, 2007
33		Dawn Marie Sass	Democratic	January 3, 2007	January 3, 2011
34		Kurt W. Schuller	Republican	January 3, 2011	January 5, 2015
35		Matt Adamczyk	Republican	January 5, 2015	January 7, 2019
36		Sarah Godlewski	Democratic	January 7, 2019	January 2, 2023
37		John Leiber	Republican	January 3, 2023	Incumbent

== See also ==
- Wisconsin Board of Commissioners of Public Lands
