= John G. McMynn =

19th century American educator and politician (1824–1900)

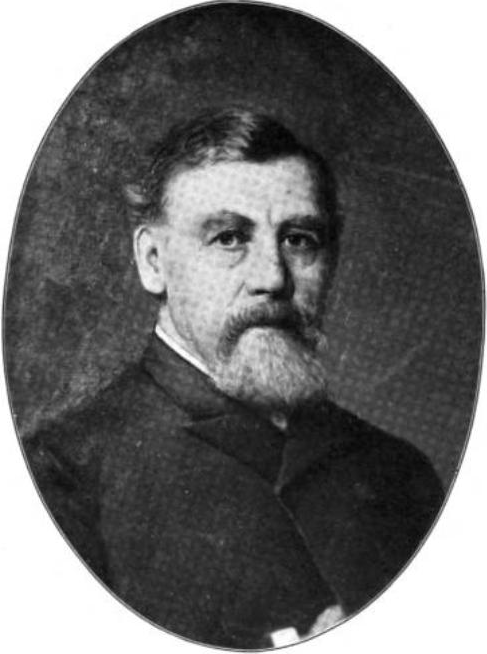

7th Superintendent of Public Instruction of Wisconsin
- In office October 1, 1864 – January 6, 1868
- Governor: James T. Lewis; Lucius Fairchild
- Preceded by: Josiah Little Pickard
- Succeeded by: Alexander J. Craig

Principal-elect of First State Normal School of Minnesota
- In office May 16, 1864 – September 22, 1864
- Preceded by: John Odgen
- Succeeded by: William F. Phelps

Personal details
- Born: John Gibson McMynn; July 9, 1824 Palatine Bridge, New York
- Died: June 5, 1900 (aged 75) Madison, Wisconsin
- Resting place: Mound Cemetery (cremated), Racine, Wisconsin
- Party: Republican
- Spouses: Eleanor Wiley (m. 1852; died 1858); Marion Frances Clarke (m. 1860–1900)
- Children: Alice McMynn^{(b. 1864; died 1866)}; Louise Marion (Greene)^{(b. 1866; died 1932)}; John Clarke McMynn^{(b. 1869; died 1921)}; Robert N. McMynn^{(b. 1871; died 1925)}; Helen (Williams)^{(b. 1874; died 1902)}
- Education: Williams College
- Occupation: educator, politician

Military service
- Allegiance: United States
- Branch/service: United States Volunteers; Union Army
- Years of service: 1861–1863
- Rank: Colonel, USV
- Commands: 10th Reg. Wis. Vol. Infantry
- Battles/wars: American Civil War: Battle of Perryville; Battle of Stones River

John Gibson McMynn (July 9, 1824 – June 5, 1900) was an American educator, Republican politician, and Wisconsin pioneer. He was the 7th Wisconsin Superintendent of Public Instruction, the first president of the Wisconsin Teachers Association, and a pioneer of public education in Racine and Kenosha, Wisconsin. He also served as a Union Army officer during the American Civil War.

== Early life and education career ==
John McMynn was born at Palatine Bridge, New York, in July 1824. His father died when he was a child, and he struggled to pay for his own education. He entered Williams College in Massachusetts in 1845 and taught school to pay for his tuition. After earning his bachelor's degree in 1848, he immediately moved west to Kenosha, Wisconsin, where he was hired as principal of the Southport Institute. After a year, he was hired as principal of Kenosha's ward 2 public school. In 1851, McMynn made his first bid for elected office, running for superintendent of public schools in the city of Kenosha; he lost the election to Michael Frank. In 1853, he moved north to the neighboring city of Racine, Wisconsin, where he was hired as the first principal of the newly-established public high school.

During these early years in Kenosha and Racine, McMynn was instrumental in the founding of the Wisconsin Teachers Association. In 1852, he helped found the Kenosha County Teachers' Association, served as its first president, and wrote much of its initial constitution. The following year, McMynn helped to organize a state education convention in Madison for the purpose of forming a state teacher's association. The convention was held in July 1853, where they voted to form the Wisconsin Teachers' Association, and elected McMynn as the first president of the organization. The following year he was appointed to the board of regents of the University of Wisconsin, and would serve on the board for 24 of the next 35 years.

McMynn was also one of the earliest members of the Republican Party of Wisconsin after it was organized in 1854. He was the party's first nominee for the state office of superintendent of public instruction in 1855. In the contentious 1855 election, McMynn lost to A. Constantine Barry by about 3,800 votes.

In 1857, the Republicans again nominated McMynn as their candidate for state superintendent. The 1857 elections were extremely close in each of the statewide contests, but McMynn fell 750 votes short of his Democratic opponent, Lyman Draper.

He continued as principal of the Racine public high school after the election, but also served as chief mathematics lecturer at Wakely T. Bull's Commercial College in Racine. In 1859, McMynn took an extensive tour of European educational institutions. After returning to Wisconsin, several Republican newspapers suggested McMynn again as their nominee for state superintendent, but the nomination went instead to Josiah Little Pickard. In the fall of 1861, he became a teacher at the First State Normal School of Minnesota.

== Civil War service ==
After the outbreak of the American Civil War, McMynn gave several patriotic speeches in favor of the Union cause, and was then appointed by the mayor of Racine to help raise volunteers for service in the Union Army. He resigned from his position in Winona in October 1861. Governor Alexander Randall commissioned McMynn as major of the 10th Wisconsin Infantry Regiment, which was then organizing at Camp Holton, Milwaukee. The 10th Wisconsin mustered into federal service in October 1861, and went south to Louisville, Kentucky.

The regiment was part of the Army of the Ohio, and later the Army of the Cumberland, engaged in the campaigns against Braxton Bragg in Kentucky and Tennessee through 1863. In July, Lt. Colonel Joshua J. Guppey was promoted to colonel of the 23rd Wisconsin Infantry Regiment, and McMynn was promoted to succeed him as lieutenant colonel of the 10th. In the fall, they participated in the Battle of Perryville, and were heavily engaged, suffering 48 killed and 97 wounded; Henry O. Johnson, who had succeeded McMynn as major, was killed in action. They were also significantly engaged in the subsequent Battle of Stones River, suffering another 7 dead.

In January 1863, Colonel Alfred Chapin resigned, and McMynn was promoted to colonel of the 10th Wisconsin. He served only six months in the role, however; during that time the regiment was reduced to only about 250 men fit for duty, and was idle at camp near Murfreesboro, Tennessee. He resigned effective June 17, 1863, and returned to Wisconsin.

== Postbellum career ==
In May of 1864, he was elected president of the First State Normal School of Minnesota, but never served. He believed he could not secure the success of the institution, and was succeeded by William F. Phelps. In 1864, McMynn was offered a federal appointment as superintendent of Indian affairs for the Washington Territory, but declined it. He instead accepted an appointment to the board of regents for the Wisconsin state normal school. Later that year, the state superintendent, Josiah Little Pickard, resigned his position; Governor James T. Lewis appointed McMynn to succeed him in an acting capacity. At the same time, McMynn was nominated by the Republican Party as their candidate to fill out the remainder of the two-year term in a special election held concurrent with the 1864 fall general election. McMynn won the special election with 56% of the vote, defeating Democrat John B. Parkinson. He was nominated for a full two-year term in 1865, and defeated Parkinson in a rematch of 1864. He attempted to run for re-election in 1867, but the Republican convention instead nominated Alexander J. Craig, who was more closely-aligned with Madison Republican boss Elisha W. Keyes.

Shortly after the expiration of his term as state superintendent, McMynn was appointed to serve again as Racine superintendent. He was also employed at Racine's J. I. Case Company as a collector. But he soon returned to working as a full-time educator, helping to found the Racine Academy in 1875 and then serving as its principal until 1882.

He retired in 1882, and spent much of the remainder of his life in Madison, Wisconsin, serving on the University of Wisconsin board of regents until 1889. He died at his home in Madison on June 5, 1900.

== Personal life and legacy ==
John McMynn married twice. His first wife was Eleanor "Ella" Wiley; they married in 1852 and she died just six years later in 1858. He subsequently married Marion Frances Clarke, on August 1, 1860. Both of McMynn's wives worked alongside him as educators in Racine. With his second wife, he had five children, though their first daughter died in infancy. In addition to working as an educator, his wife Marion was also very active in the temperance movement, and for many years served as an officer in the Racine Woman's Christian Temperance Union.

Shortly after his death, McMynn School was established in Racine and named for him. The school building later housed Walden III Middle and High School. The school was demolished in 1975 and replaced by an apartment building named McMynn Tower.

His former home in Racine is still standing.

== Electoral history ==
=== Kenosha superintendent (1851) ===
Kenosha Superintendent of Public Schools Election, 1851
Party	Candidate	Votes	%	±%
General Election, April 1, 1851
Democratic	Michael Frank	445	76.19%	
Independent	John G. McMynn	143	24.32%	
Plurality		302	51.36%	
Total votes		588	100.0%	
Democratic hold				

=== Wisconsin superintendent (1855, 1857) ===
Wisconsin Superintendent of Public Instruction Election, 1855
Party	Candidate	Votes	%	±%
General Election, November 6, 1855
Democratic	A. Constantine Barry	38,389	52.60%	−4.67pp
Republican	John G. McMynn	34,550	47.34%	+4.61pp
	Scattering	42	0.05%	
Plurality		3,839	5.26%	-9.27pp
Total votes		72,981	100.0%	+35.24%
Democratic hold				

Wisconsin Superintendent of Public Instruction Election, 1857
Party	Candidate	Votes	%	±%
General Election, November 3, 1857
Democratic	Lyman Draper	45,302	50.31%	−2.29pp
Republican	John G. McMynn	44,554	49.48%	+2.14pp
	Scattering	181	0.20%	
Plurality		748	0.83%	-4.43pp
Total votes		90,037	100.0%	+23.37%
Democratic hold				

=== Wisconsin superintendent (1864, 1865) ===
Wisconsin Superintendent of Public Instruction Special Election, 1864
Party	Candidate	Votes	%	±%
General Election, November 8, 1864
Republican	John G. McMynn	75,384	56.62%	
Democratic	John B. Parkinson	57,756	43.38%	
Plurality		17,628	13.24%	
Total votes		133,140	100.0%	
Republican hold				

Wisconsin Superintendent of Public Instruction Election, 1865
Party	Candidate	Votes	%	±%
General Election, November 7, 1865
Republican	John G. McMynn (incumbent)	58,487	54.95%	−1.67pp
Democratic	John B. Parkinson	47,945	45.05%	
Plurality		10,542	9.90%	
Total votes		106,432	100.0%	-20.06%
Republican hold				

Party political offices
New party	Republican nominee for Superintendent of Public Instruction of Wisconsin; 1855, 1857	Succeeded by Josiah Little Pickard
Preceded by Josiah Little Pickard	Republican nominee for Superintendent of Public Instruction of Wisconsin; 1864, 1865	Succeeded by Alexander J. Craig
Military offices
Preceded by Col. Alfred R. Chapin	Command of the 10th Wisconsin Infantry Regiment; January 1863 – June 16, 1863	Succeeded by Lt. Col. John H. Ely
Political offices
Preceded by Josiah Little Pickard	Superintendent of Public Instruction of Wisconsin; 1864 – 1868	Succeeded by Alexander J. Craig
