= Burnley (surname) =

Burnley is a surname. Notable people with the surname include:

- Benjamin Burnley (born 1978), vocalist of American alternative metal band Breaking Benjamin
- Dorothy R. Burnley (1927–2016), American politician and businesswoman from North Carolina
- James H. Burnley IV (born 1948), American politician and lawyer from North Carolina
- Kenneth S. Burnley (1942–2011), senior resident fellow at the University of Michigan School of Education
- Liz Burnley (born 1959), chief guide of Girlguiding UK since 2006
- Roger Burnley (born 1966), British businessman, CEO of Asda

Fictional characters:

- Ilse Burnley, character in Lucy Maud Montgomery's Emily of New Moon series
