= Duane Doty School =

- U.S. National Register of Historic Places
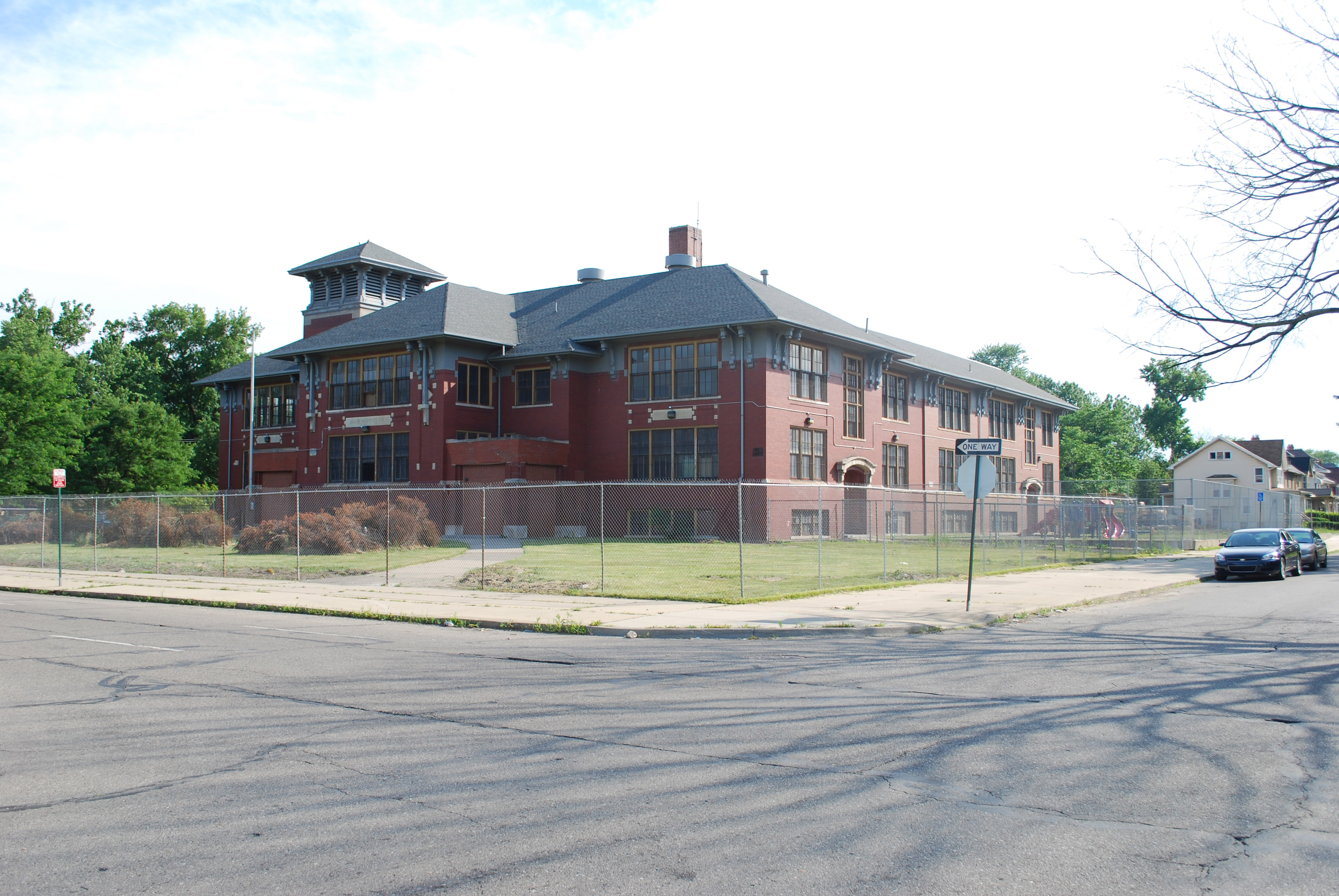
- Interactive map
- Location: 10225 3rd Street; Detroit, Michigan
- Coordinates: 42°23′12″N 83°5′33″W
- Area: less than one acre
- Built: 1908
- Architect: Malcomson and Higginbotham
- Architectural style: Arts and Crafts
- MPS: Public Schools of Detroit MPS
- NRHP reference No.: 10000654
- Added to NRHP: December 12, 2011

The Duane Doty School is a school building located at 10225 3rd Street in Detroit, Michigan. It was listed on the National Register of Historic Places in 2011. It is the oldest Arts and Crafts-style school building in Detroit, and likely one of the oldest Arts and Crafts-style schools in Michigan.

== History ==
The Duane Doty School was named after former Superintendent of Schools for Detroit Duane Doty, who was appointed to that post in 1865. The original building was designed by Malcomson and Higginbotham, with construction starting in 1908 and ending in 1909. When it opened, the school contained 20 classrooms and was intended to hold 640 students from kindergarten through eighth grade. An addition costing $134,300 was completed in 1921, which added 320 students to the school's capacity. A gymnasium addition was constructed in 1928. In 1959, the building was substantially remodeled, and six new classrooms were added in the basement and first floor. By the end of 1960, enrollment in the school was 1,193 students.

The building was later used as the Boykin Continuing Education Center. After major renovations completed in 2012, the building was re-opened as The Henry Ford Academy: Elementary School. In 2019 it was renamed to University Prep Art and Design Elementary School.

== Description ==
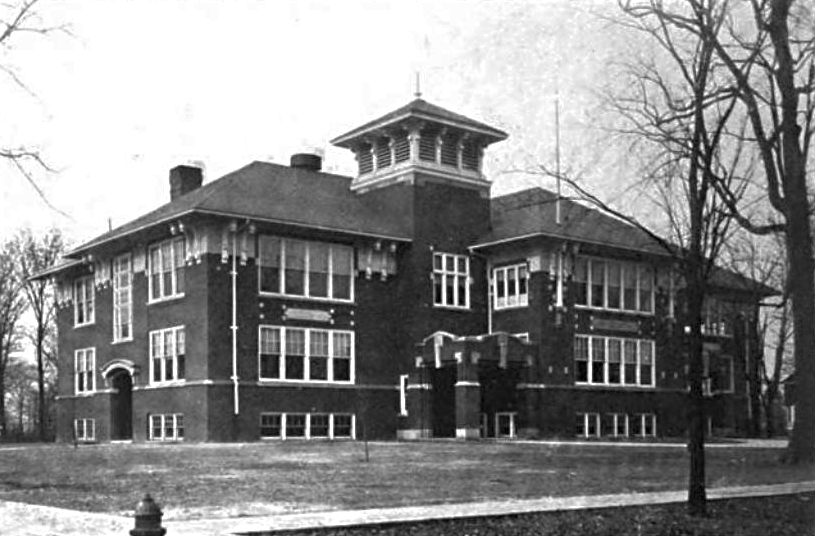
Duane Doty School, c. 1910

The Duane Doty School is a two-story L-shaped, red brick, hipped roof structure placed on a high, windowed basement. The front facade has five bays, with the central bay projecting substantially outward. The two main entrances are located in single story vestibules flanking the main bay. The central and end bays of the school contain rows of wooden six-over-six sash windows with stone sills. The roof eaves are supported by paired or triples sets of oversized decorative brackets. A square tower behind one of the entrances pierces the roofline. A hipped roof addition dating from 1921 sits behind the building, and the flat-roofed gymnasium from 1928 extends further.

Inside the building, the main entry vestibules have terrazzo floors, with staircases leading up to the first floor. The original L-shaped building has two intersecting corridors leading to classrooms. The kindergarten classrooms are located between the two main entrances at the front of the building. The additions contain a one-story auditorium on the first floor with a gymnasium below in the basement.
