= 10th Wisconsin Infantry Regiment =

Union Army infantry regiment

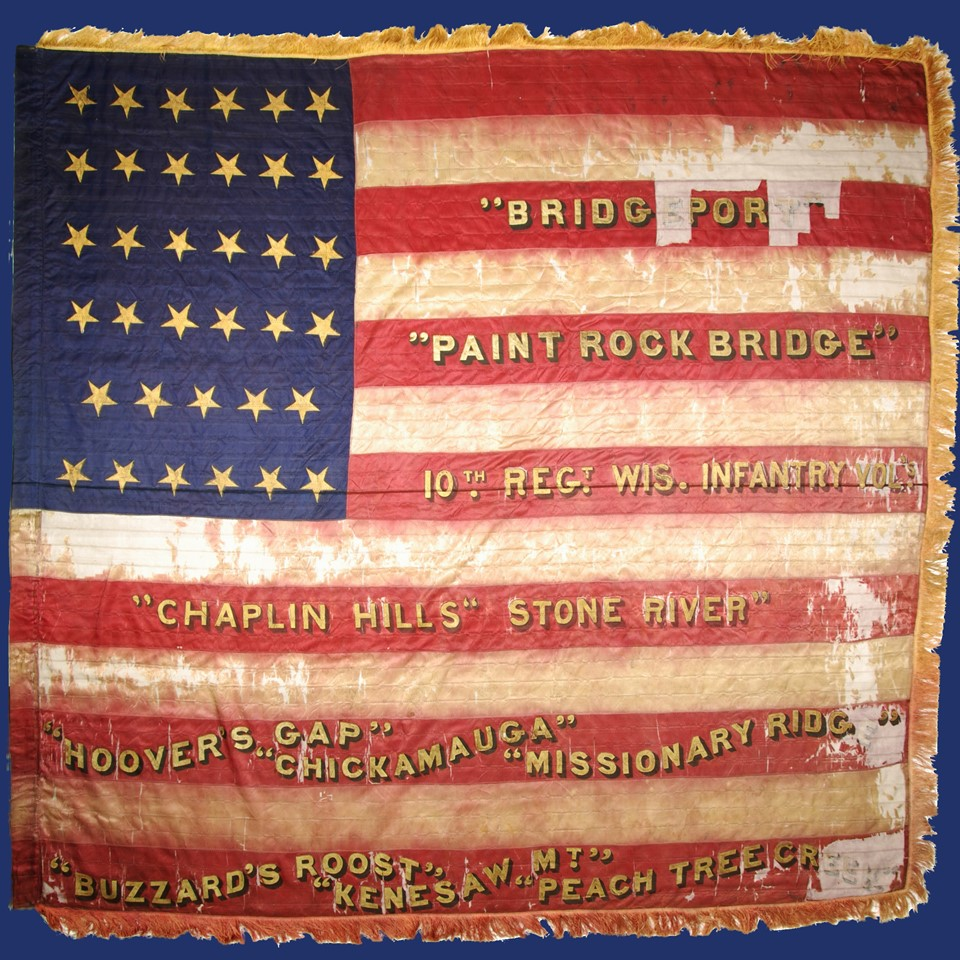
- National colors of the 10th Wisconsin, 1863
- Active: October 14, 1861 – October 25, 1864
- Country: United States
- Allegiance: Union
- Branch: Union Army
- Role: Infantry
- Size: Regiment
- Engagements: American Civil War; Battle of Perryville; Battle of Stone's River; Battle of Chickamauga; Chattanooga campaign; First Battle of Dalton; Atlanta campaign; Battle of Resaca; Battle of Rocky Face Ridge; Battle of Kennesaw Mountain; Battle of Peachtree Creek; Battle of Jonesborough

Commanders
- Colonel: Alfred R. Chapin
- Colonel: John G. McMynn
- Lt. Col.: John H. Ely
- Lt. Col.: Jacob W. Roby
- Capt.: Joshua James Guppey

The 10th Wisconsin Infantry Regiment was a volunteer infantry regiment that served in the Union Army during the American Civil War. The regiment was engaged in many of the critical battles of the western theater of the war, including Perryville, Stone's River, and Chickamauga—where a large portion of the regiment was taken as prisoners of war.

== Service ==
The 10th Wisconsin was raised at Milwaukee, Wisconsin, and mustered into Federal service on October 14, 1861. Staying in the west it became part of the Army of the Ohio's 9th Brigade under Col. Joshua W. Sill. The regiment suffered very heavy casualties in the Battle of Perryville in September 1862, when out of 276 men some 147 were killed, wounded or missing. Afterwards, when the Army of the Ohio became the Army of the Cumberland and created a permanent corps structure, the regiment became part of the XIV Corps. In September 1863, during the Battle of Chickamauga, 72 men were killed and wounded and some 132 men were missing, most of them being captured and becoming prisoners of war. When the regiment's initial three-year enlistments expired in October 1864, the more recent recruits and the veterans who chose to re-enlist were transferred to the 21st Wisconsin Infantry Regiment.

The 10th Wisconsin initially mustered 1,029 men and later recruited an additional 601 men, for a total of 1,630 men throughout the war. The regiment lost 5 officers and 91 enlisted men killed in action or who later died of their wounds, plus another 1 officer and 147 enlisted men who died of disease, for a total of 244 fatalities.

=== Detailed service record ===
- Duty at Bacon Creek, Ky., till February, 1862
- Advance on Bowling Green, Ky., February 13–15 and on Nashville, Tenn., February 22–25
- Duty at Nashville till March 17
- Advance on Murfreesboro March 17–19
- Occupation of Shelbyville and Fayetteville and advance on Huntsville, Ala., April 5–11
- Capture of Huntsville April 11
- Paint Rock Bridge April 28 (Co. "H")
- Pulaski May 4
- Guard duty along Memphis & Charleston Railroad till August
- Battle Creek June 21
- March to Nashville, Tenn., thence to Louisville, Ky., in pursuit of Bragg August 31-September 26
- Pursuit of Bragg to Crab Orchard, Ky., October 1–16
- Battle of Perryville, Ky., October 8
- March to Nashville, Tenn., October 17-November 7, and duty there till December 26
- Advance on Murfreesboro December 26–30
- Battle of Stone's River, December 30–31, 1862, and January 1–3, 1863
- Duty at Murfreesboro till June
- Middle Tennessee (or Tullahoma) Campaign June 23-July 7
- Hoover's Gap, June 24–26
- Occupation of Middle Tennessee till August 16
- Passage of the Cumberland Mountains and Tennessee River and Chickamauga (Ga.) Campaign August 16-September 22
- Davis' Cross Roads near Dug Gap September 11
- Battle of Chickamauga, September 19–21
- Siege of Chattanooga September 24-November 23
- Chattanooga-Ringgold Campaign November 23–27
- Orchard Knob November 23
- Mission Ridge November 25
- Pea Vine Creek November 26
- Demonstration on Dalton, Ga., February 22–27, 1864
- Tunnel Hill, Buzzard's Roost Gap and Rocky Faced Ridge February 23–25
- At Tyner's Station guarding East Tennessee & Georgia Railroad till May 24
- Operations on line of Pumpkin Vine Creek and battles about Dallas, New Hope Church and Allatoona Hills May 26-June 5
- Pickett's Mill, May 27
- Operations about Marietta and against Kenesaw Mountain June 10-July 2
- Pine Hill, June 11–14
- Lost Mountain June 15–17
- Assault on Kenesaw Mountain June 27
- Ruff's Station July 4
- Chattahoochie River July 5–17
- Buckhead, Nancy's Creek, July 18
- Peach Tree Creek, July 19–20
- Ordered to Marietta and duty there till October 3
- Guard duty near Kenesaw Mountain till October 16
- Mustered out October 25, 1864
- Veterans and recruits transferred to 21st Wisconsin Infantry

== Companies ==
Company	Original Moniker	Primary Place of Recruitment	Captain(s)
A	Walworth County Guards	Walworth County and Lafayette County	Henry O. Johnson (KIA); Robert Harkness (POW, mustered out)
B	Lyon Guards	Dodge County	Jacob Whitman Roby (WIA, mustered out)
C	Menasha Guards	Menasha, Winnebago County, and Calumet County	Andrew Jackson Richardson (resigned); James C. Adams (WIA, resigned)
D	Fremont Rifles	Columbia County and Adams County	James Lambert Coffin (transferred); Orestus B. Twogood (resigned); William A. Collins (POW, mustered out)
E	Sturdy Oaks	Hartford, Juneau County, Dodge County, and Washington County	John H. Ely (promoted); George M. West (KIA)
F	Grant County Patriots	Grant County	William H. Palmer (resigned); Robert Rennie (acting, KIA)
G	Jackson County Rifles	Black River Falls, Jackson County	William P. Moore (KIA); Andrew J. Richardson (resigned); Norman Thatcher (mustered out)
H	Juneau County Rifles	Juneau County and Monroe County	Duncan McKercher (promoted); Robert H. Spencer (POW, mustered out)
I	Grant County Sixth	Monroe County	Caleb T. Overton (resigned); Samuel W. Herrick (resigned); Frank W. Perry (POW, mustered out)
K	Waupun Rifles	Waupun, Dodge County, and Fond du Lac County	Edwin Hillyer (resigned); Robert Kohlsdorf (resigned); Charles H. Ford (mustered out)

== Commanders ==
- Colonel Alfred Rose Chapin (October 14, 1861 – January 23, 1863) resigned. Earlier in the war, he had served as adjutant of the 1st Wisconsin Infantry Regiment, and was detailed as assistant adjutant general of their brigade.
- Colonel John Gibson McMynn (January 1863 – June 16, 1863) resigned. He joined the regiment as its original major; he was promoted to lieutenant colonel in July 1862 and to colonel at the time of Chapin's resignation. Before the war, he had been a teacher and pioneer of public education, and was one of the founders of the Wisconsin Teachers Association. After returning from the war, he was appointed Wisconsin's superintendent of public instruction by Governor James T. Lewis.
- Lt. Col. John Hager Ely (June 16, 1863 – September 20, 1863) was mortally wounded at the Battle of Chickamauga, and died of wounds while a prisoner of war. He joined the regiment as captain of Co. E, was promoted to major in November 1862, and was promoted to lieutenant colonel at the time of McMynn's resignation in June 1863.
- Capt. Jacob Whitman Roby (September 20, 1863 – October 25, 1864) was captain of Co. B when he took command of the regiment after the loss of Lt. Col. Ely at the battle of Chickaumauga. He continued as acting commander of the regiment until its dissolution. Wisconsin governor James T. Lewis ordered Roby promoted to the rank of lieutenant colonel in October 1864, but the rank was never confirmed by federal authorities.

== Other notable people ==
- John A. Barney was enlisted in Co. B and promoted to 1st sergeant. He was lost an arm and was captured at Chickamauga, and was then discharged due to disability. After the war he served as a Wisconsin state senator.
- Joshua James Guppey was the original lieutenant colonel of the regiment and was commissioned colonel of the 23rd Wisconsin Infantry Regiment in July 1862. After the war he received an honorary brevet to brigadier general and served as a Wisconsin county judge.
- Sophronius S. Landt was enlisted in Co. D and promoted to sergeant. After the war he served as a Wisconsin state legislator.
- Robert Mitchell was 1st assistant surgeon of the regiment and later commissioned surgeon of the 27th Wisconsin Infantry Regiment. After the war he served as a Wisconsin state legislator.

== See also ==
- List of Wisconsin Civil War units
- Wisconsin in the American Civil War
