= Brumley =

Brumley may refer to:

- Brumley, Missouri, a village in Miller County, Missouri, United States
- Brumley, a fictional town in England where J. B. Priestley's play An Inspector Calls is set
- Albert E. Brumley (1905–1977), American Gospel singer and composer
- George Brumley, Jr. (1934/5–2003), American physician and academic
- Mike Brumley (catcher) (1938–2016), American baseball player
- Mike Brumley (infielder) (born 1963), American baseball player

== See also ==
- Burnley, England
- Burnley (disambiguation)
