= John M. B. Sill =

American diplomat

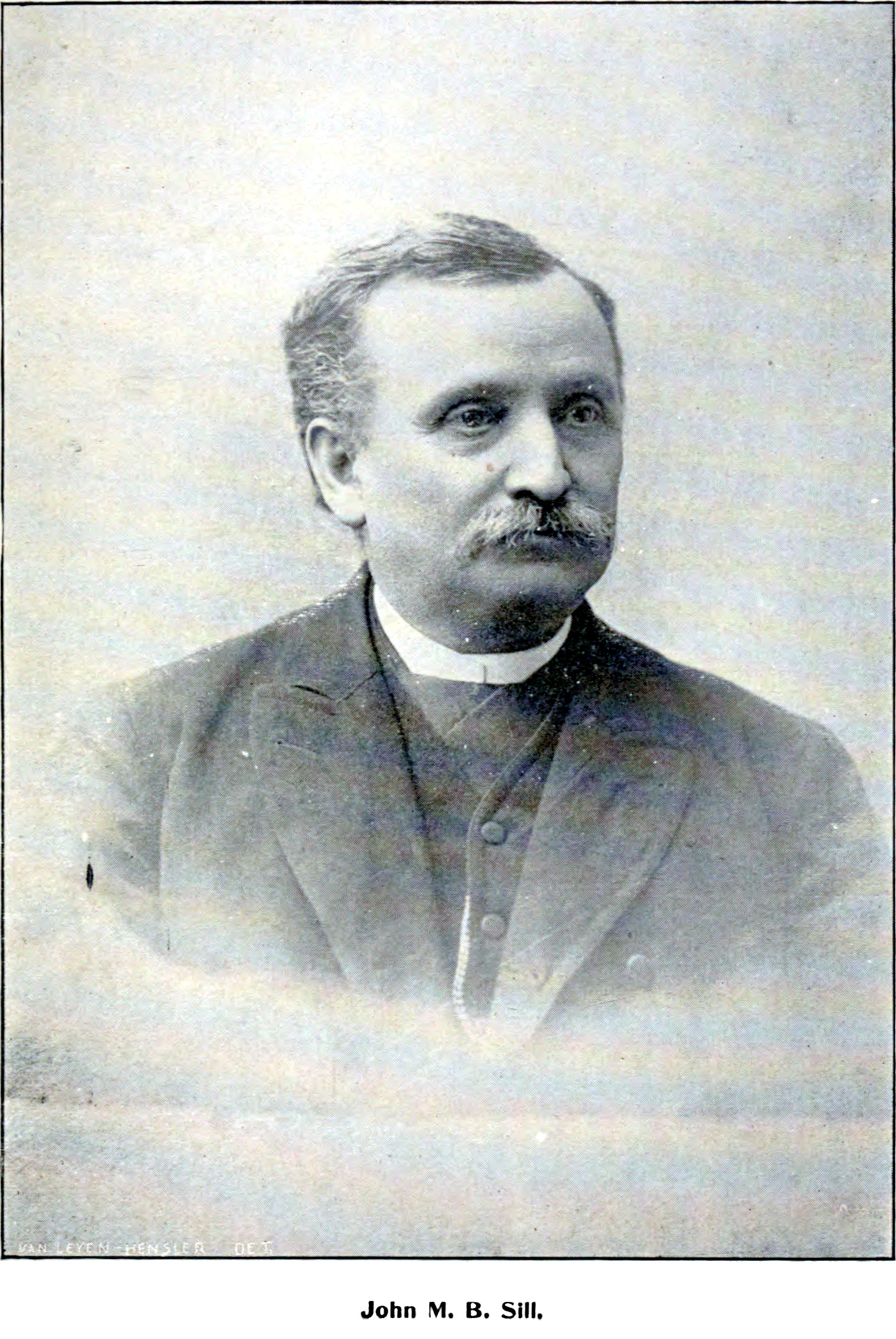

United States Consul General to Korea
- In office April 30, 1894 – September 13, 1897
- President: Grover Cleveland; William McKinley
- Preceded by: Augustine Heard II
- Succeeded by: Horace Newton Allen

President of the Michigan State Normal College
- In office 1886–1893
- Preceded by: Daniel Putnam
- Succeeded by: Richard Gause Boone

Superintendent of Detroit Public Schools
- In office 1875–1886
- Preceded by: Duane Doty
- Succeeded by: William E. Robinson
- In office 1863
- Succeeded by: Duane Doty

Personal details
- Born: November 23, 1831 Black Rock, New York, U.S.
- Died: April 6, 1901 (aged 69) Detroit, Michigan, U.S.
- Party: Democratic
- Spouse: Sally Beaumont (m. 1864)
- Children: 2
- Education: University of Michigan (MA)

John Malhelm Berry Sill (November 23, 1831 – April 6, 1901) was an American diplomat and educator who served as the United States Consul General to Korea, president of Michigan State Normal College (which was renamed as Eastern Michigan University), and superintendent of Detroit Public Schools. He also served as a regent of the University of Michigan.

== Early life ==
Sill was born on November 23, 1831 in Black Rock, a small neighborhood near Buffalo, New York to parents of English descent whose ancestors arrived in 1637. When he was a child, Sill's parents moved to Michigan and later to Oberlin, Ohio, but soon moved back to Michigan and settled in Jonesville. Both of Sill's parents died on the same day when he was 11 years old, forcing Sill to work on a farm to earn enough money to attend school and purchase clothing and books.

== Educational career ==
Sill began a career as a teacher when he was 18 at a school in Scipio Township, Michigan. He progressed in this career, moving back to Jonesville and taking a position in Ypsilanti at age 21. When he was 22, he began studying at the State Normal School at Ypsilanti, graduating in 1854, the first man to have done so. Upon graduating, he was appointed as a professor of English language and literature at the school, and was made head of the department and principal from 1858 to 1859. In 1863, he was appointed as superintendent of Detroit Public Schools, but resigned soon after to become principal of Detroit Female Seminary, a position he held for ten years. In 1867, he was appointed a regent of the University of Michigan. He held this position through 1869.

In February 1875, after the retirement of Duane Doty, Sill was elected by the Detroit Board of Education to be the superintendent of Detroit Public Schools. On July 28, 1881, the Detroit Board of Education approved Sill's plan to establish a normal school in Detroit, something that his predecessor had pushed unsuccessfully for throughout his tenure. That September, the Detroit Normal Training School for Teachers began offering classes at the city's only high school (located in the state's original capitol building). The school later became part of what is today Wayne State University.

Sill served as Detroit superintendent until becoming president of Michigan State Normal College, a position he was elected to on July 22, 1886. He held the college's presidency until 1893.

== Consul General to Korea ==
Sill served as United States Consul General (ambassador) to Korea from 1894 to 1897, during a time that has been described as one of the most turbulent periods of Korean history. Graduating from University of Michigan helped him to acquire the position as many of the members of the Department of State were alumni of the university. In particular was his loyalty to the Democratic Party and efforts of his friend, Donald M. Dickinson, a lawyer from Detroit, former U.S. Postmaster General, and confidant of President Grover Cleveland, who appointed Sill as Consul General.

Sill proved adept as Consul General. According to his obituary in the Detroit Free Press, Sill was so successful in winning the affections of officials and people that they "almost idolized" him. A prime minister of the time also supposedly expressed a desire to adopt his son, Joseph Sill.

During his tenure as Consul General, Korea went through the Sino-Japanese War, the Gabo Reform, the murder of Empress Myeongseong, and Emperor Gojong's refuge in the Russian legation. Empress Myeongseong's assassination had a profound impact on Sill, who later told stories of her attempt to escape and untimely death.

Sill sought to maintain the independence of Korea and check the increasing Japanese influence by consistently asking America to enforce Japanese to withdraw from Korea. When the Japanese became the victor of the war against China, Sill provided the American legation as a refuge for anti-Japanese officials.

== Personal life ==
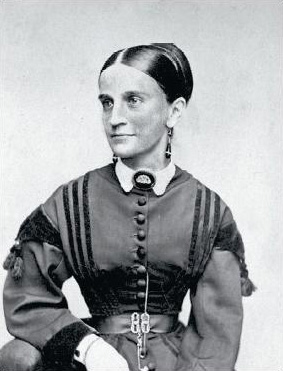
Sally Sill (date unknown)

Sill married Sally Beaumont in 1864. Upon leaving the U.S. with her husband, Sally fell into a state of depression and suffered from asthma and rheumatism while in Korea, which prevented her from meeting Emperor Gojong and Empress Myeongseong upon their arrival.

They had two children: Joseph Sill and Alice Cram. Joseph, who was a teenager at the time, joined his parents in Korea while Alice, who was married, stayed in the U.S. Sally died in Detroit, Michigan in 1903 at the age of 69 from Bright's disease.

After leaving Korea, Sill continued to be involved with the public schools of Detroit and provided lectures to people about Korea and its people. Sill died at age 69 at Grace Hospital in Detroit in the morning of April 6, 1901 from illnesses contracted while he was in Korea. His funeral was held at St. Paul's church.

== Legacy ==
Sill Hall at Eastern Michigan University, as Michigan State Normal is now known, is named for Sill.
