= Warren E. Bow =

American college president (1891–1945)

Warren Edward Bow (June 2, 1891 – May 12, 1945) was the second president of Wayne University, now Wayne State University, from 1942 to 1945. He grew the university during World War II by having it become a training center for workers entering war production industries.

== Personal life ==
Bow was born in Detroit, Michigan. He attended Detroit Public Schools and graduated from the University of Illinois in 1914 with a degree in engineering. While at Illinois, he was a member of the Phi chapter of Sigma Pi fraternity and Scabbard and Blade. He joined the U.S. Army and saw service on the Mexico–United States border in 1916 and in France during World War I. Before deploying to France he married Marjorie Chaney on July 21, 1917. Their marriage wouldn't last. He started the war as a captain in the 119th Field Artillery with the 32nd Division. He was later promoted to major and became an instructor of Field Artillery for the American Expeditionary Force.

Bow later took a second wife, Marion Flaherty Bow. He had two children with Marian, Nancy Ann Bow and Warren James Bow. Nancy died when she was four years old. He was a member of the Masons, Knight Templar, AASR, Shriner, Kiwanis and the Michigan Schoolmasters’ Club. Also, he was a member of All Saints Episcopal Church and was on the board of trustees for the City Mission of the Episcopal Church in Detroit.

== Professional life ==
=== Detroit Public Schools ===
In 1919 he came back to Detroit and became a principal at Nordstrum High School. He was appointed assistant dean of the Detroit Teachers College, now Wayne State's College of Education, in 1922. He would serve as its dean from 1926 to 1930. In 1923 he received his Master of Arts degree from the University of Michigan. He would receive an honorary doctorate from Battle Creek College.

Bow was named assistant superintendent of schools in 1930 and was in charge of the technical and vocational schools. He also took on the second job of serving as principal of Cass Technical High School in 1935. In 1939 he became first assistant superintendent in charge of all secondary schools, and then became deputy superintendent in 1941. In July 1942, he was named superintendent of schools in Detroit as well as the president of Wayne University.

=== Wayne State University ===
Bow served as superintendent of the Detroit Public Schools and president of Wayne University from July, 1942 until his death on May 12, 1945. During World War II, he led the university through some of its most challenging and important times. Under his leadership, it became an official War Information Center, preparing more than 400,000 people for jobs in Detroit's war production efforts.

While president of the university, he oversaw the establishment of the College of Nursing in 1945.

Bow died in his sleep in Detroit.

After his death the job of Detroit School Superintendent and President of Wayne State University was separated into two different positions. Warren E. Bow Elementary School was named for him as was a scholarship for Detroit students who attend Wayne State.

Preceded by Frank Cody	President of Wayne State University; 1942-1945	Succeeded by David D. Henry
