= List of superintendents of Detroit Public Schools =

Detroit Public Schools Community District and the original Detroit Public Schools district (that existed before a 2016 reorganization) has been headed by a superintendent position that was first filled in 1856.

== History of the office ==
The first superintendent of Detroit Public Schools was appointed in 1856 by the Detroit Board of Education. The superintendent co-managed responsibility for the administration of the district alongside the elected members of the board. When legislation was passed in 1873 to allow the board to appoint a secretary and treasurer, the legislation permitted for superintendents to also serve simultaneously as board secretary so long as they did not receive additional compensation for doing so.

In 1881, legislation was passed reorganizing the school board. This legislation made the superintendent the school district's executive officer. By 1900, the superintendent position had acquired substantial authority in the operations of schools, but the mayor of Detroit and Detroit City Council also effectively held significant control over how the school district was run. The school board was again reorganized in 1916 by legislation which also increased the power of the office of superintendent.

From 1999 through 2005, the school district operated under state control, with the superintendent position becoming a state-appointed CEO role.

From 2009 until the district's reorganization in 2016, much of the district's administration was overseen by state-appointed emergency managers. After the reorganization, some administration was overseen by Steven Rhodes as transition manager.

== List of superintendents ==
Name	Tenure	Citation
John F. Nichols	1856	
Divie Bethune Duffield	1857	
John M. B. Sill	1863	
Duane Doty	1864–1875	
John M. B. Sill	1875–September 1, 1886	
William E. Robinson	September 1, 1886 – 1897	
Wales C. Martindale	1897–1912	
Charles E. Chadsey	1912–1919	
Frank Cody	1919–1942	
Warren E. Bow	1942–1945	
Arthur Dondineau	1945–1956	
Samuel Miller Brownell	1956–1966	
Norman Drachler	1966–1971	
Charles J. Wolfe	1971–1975	
Arthur Jefferson	1975–1989 (interim general superintendent Jul. 1–Nov. 4, 1975; permanent general superintendent Nov. 4, 1975–1989)	
John W. Porter	1989–1991	
Deborah McGriff	1991–1993	
David Snead	December 1993–October 1997	
Eddie L. Green	April 1997–May 1999 (interim superintendent Apr. 1997–Apr. 1998; acting superintendent Apr. 1998–Nov. 1998; permanent superintendent Nov. 1998–Mar. 1999; acting CEO Mar. 1999–May 1999)	
David Adamy	May 1999 – 2000 (CEO)	
Kenneth S. Burnley	2000– June 30, 2005 (CEO)	
William F. Coleman III	July 2005–June 30, 2007 (CEO July 2005–Jan. 2006; interim superintendent Jan.–Mar. 2006; permanent superintendent Mar. 2006– Jun. 2007)	
Connie Calloway	July 1, 2007 – December 15, 2008	
Teresa Gueyser	December 15, 2008 – July 1, 2010 (acting/interim superintendent December 15, 2008–August 14, 2009; permanent superintendent August 14, 2009–July 1, 2010)	
Karen Ridgeway	2011–15	
Alycia Meriweather (interim)	2016–17	
Nikolai Vitti	2017–present	
