= Charles E. Chadsey =

American educator

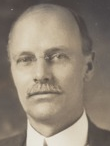

11th Superintendent of Chicago Public Schools
- In office March 1919–November 29, 1919
- Preceded by: John Shoop; Peter A. Mortenson (acting)
- Succeeded by: Peter A. Mortenson

Superintendent of Detroit Public Schools
- In office 1912–1919
- Preceded by: Wales C. Martindale
- Succeeded by: Frank Cody

Superintendent of Denver Public Schools
- In office 1907–1912

Personal details
- Born: Charles Ernest Chadsey; October 15, 1870 Nebraska City, Nebraska
- Died: April 9, 1930 (aged 59) Urbana, Illinois
- Spouse: Callie Worth Chadsey (née Price)
- Children: Charles Price Chadsey
- Parent(s): Franklin Chadsey; Sallie Maria Chadsey (née Barnum)
- Education: Columbia University; Stanford University
- Occupation: Educator, Author, College Dean, School Superintendent

Charles Ernest Chadsey (October 15, 1870 – April 9, 1930) was an American educator and school administrator. He served as superintendent of city schools in Chicago, Detroit, Denver, and Durango.

== Early life ==
Chadsey was born in Nebraska City, Nebraska, to Frankin and Marie (Barnum) Chadsey. He graduated from Stanford University in 1892 and from Columbia University in 1894, earning a Ph.D. in philosophy from the latter.

== Career ==
Chadsey became a prominent educator. In his obituary, his hometown paper, the Nebraska Daily News-Press, described him as having been, "one of the best known as brilliant young men of his era". In the April 20, 1922 issue of The Daily Illini, (the student newspaper of the University of Illinois, where Chadsey was working at the time) an article about Chadsey and his career was published praising his accomplishments, character, and the high regard in which students and faculty held him. The article declared that, "it was in the positions of superintendent of public schools in Denver, Detroit and Chicago that he proved himself to be the most able man in his line in the country" and considered by many to have been "The foremost school superintendent of the United States."

Chadsey was a member of the National Educational Association and its Educational Council where he served as president of the Department of Superintendence in 1911 and 1912. His fraternal organization affiliations were Phi Delta Theta and Phi Beta Kappa. He was also the author of several books and numerous educational magazine articles.

He additionally served as a lecturer at the University of Colorado and the University of Wisconsin. He also was a writer. He wrote elementary school readers and arithmetics, an historical tract on the Reconstruction era of American history, and articles in educational magazines.

=== Durango and Denver public schools ===
Chadsey began his teaching career working in a high school in Durango, Colorado. He came to serve as the district's superintendent. He, thereafter, spent five years as superintendent of Denver Public Schools. He resigned his job in Denver in 1912 in order to serve as superintendent in Detroit.

=== Superintendent of Detroit Public Schools ===
After serving five years as superintendent in Denver, Chadsey was appointed superintendent of Detroit Public Schools at an August 9, 1912 meeting of the Detroit Board of Education after the board had voted to end Wales C. Martindale's fifteen years as superintendent. Chadsey was voted in by 10–1, with a single member of the board instead voting for Dubuque, Iowa school superintendent James H. Harris. No board members that had opposed Martindale's ouster were in attendance, in an apparent failed effort at preventing a quorum. Harris had previously been favored for the job by the members of the board in attendance until Chadsey appeared before the board that night to personally apply for the job.

During his tenure in Detroit, his methods attracted national interest. At the time he took it over, the district held a negative reputation for the tendency of contentious local politics to inundate its administration. Chadsey earned praise for keeping his distance from politics while superintendent, and for positive results of his administration of the district.

In 1918, Chadsey was one of many names mentioned as a potential choice to be the new public school superintendent in New York City. The New York Tribune conducted a survey in which seventy-eight education leaders from across the United States (district superintendents, state superintendents, journal editors, educational association leaders) opined on the individuals that were being floated as potential contenders for the New York City Public Schools superintendency. Eleven of the experts were asked to provide comments on Chadsey, with ten responses being received. The All responded praised his suitability for the position, with one commenting, "he would measure up well to the demands", and another noting, "he is a leader who know the requirements of big cities and how to meet them." Praise was given to his success in leading Detroit's school district, particularly his ability to avoid politics. One commented, "he has made good in harder city jobs than any man in the United States". Another commented "he is one of the best superintendents in the country. He has made a great success of the Detroit schools. He manages without friction." Another noted, "he put Detroit schools, once notoriously fully of politics, into the front rank." Chadsey was further praised both for his business sensibilities and other attributes, with one comment noting, "he is a business man, a thinker and not a politician" and another remarking, "he not only possesses most unusual powers as a corporate manager, but has all the fine qualities of a humanist with the technique of a genuine child-lover." Other attributes praised in responses included his capability, intelligence, training, overall experience, and his personality as an administrator. Also earning praise was the soundness and sanity of his positions.

=== Superintendent of Chicago Public Schools ===
In 1919, after the death of superintendent of Chicago Public Schools John Shoop, Chadsey was appointed superintendent. He left his post as superintendent of schools for Detroit to assume the role of Chicago's superintendent in March. The Chicago Board of Education had hired Chadsey with an unprecedented $18,000 annual salary. This very large salary attracted significant public discussion.

On April 2, less than month after Chadsey had started in the position, mayor William Hale Thompson asked that he resign. Thompson had publicly taken issue with Chadsey having not been hired from within the ranks of the school district, remarking,

Chadsey may be a great educator, but it is not fair to our great educational system to go outside of the city for a superintendent. It is not treating our people squarely to lay down the principle that we are incapable of building our own teachers to fill any positions the schools afford.

In late April 1919, being reelected mayor in the Chicago mayoral election earlier that month, Thompson had the majority of Board of Education that was aligned with him strip Chadsey of his powers and duties and replaced him with a "successor". Thompson also had the Chicago police lock Chadsey out of his office at the headquarters building of the school board after Chadsey refused to cooperate. Supporters of Chadsey brought about quo warranto proceedings seeking to compel his reinstatement by the Board of Education. On November 9, 1919, Circuit Court of Cook County Judge Kickham Scanlan ordered Mortenson removed and Chadsey reinstated with his authority as superintendent. However, Chadsey resigned on November 29, 1919, complaining that the Chicago Board of Education had refused to cooperate with his leadership as the school district's superintendent, and declaring that he did not intend to act as a figurehead superintendent. He only been able to act as superintendent for mere weeks of his tenure due to the actions of Thompson and the Board of Education. Some members of the Board of Education were ultimately convicted of conspiracy for Chadsey's ouster and were sentenced by a judge in the Circuit Court of Cook County.

=== Later career ===
After leaving Chicago Public Schools, he taught at the University of Chicago. He ended his career at the University of Illinois College of Education in Urbana-Champaign, where he served as dean until his death at the age of 59.

== Personal life and death ==
Chadsey married Callie Worth Price of Durango in 1897. They had one son, Charles Prince Chadsey. On April 9, 1930, at the age of 59, Chadsey died in Urbana, Illinois of a heart attack which came following two days of illness. He was survived by both his wife and son.

== Works ==
- Chadsey, Charles E. The Struggle Between President Johnson and Congress Over Reconstruction (1897)
- Chadsey, Charles E. America in the making: From Wilderness to World Power (1928)

== See also ==
- Marquis, Albert Nelson. The Book of Detroiters: A Biographical Dictionary Of Leading Living Men Of The City of Detroit (1908) 2nd Edition (1914)
