= Hiram A. Wright =

American educator and politician

3rd Superintendent of Public Instruction of Wisconsin
- In office January 2, 1854 – May 27, 1855
- Preceded by: Azel P. Ladd
- Succeeded by: Alfred Constantine Barry

Member of the Wisconsin State Assembly
- In office 1853

Member of the Wisconsin Senate
- In office 1851–1852

Personal details
- Born: 1823 St. Lawrence County, New York
- Died: May 27, 1855 (aged 31–32) Prairie du Chien, Wisconsin
- Party: Democratic

Hiram A. Wright (1823 – May 27, 1855) was an American educator and politician from Wisconsin.

Born in St. Lawrence County, New York, Wright moved to Prairie du Chien, Wisconsin in 1846. Wright started the newspaper the Prairie du Chien Patriot in 1848 and he edited The Courier. He also studied law and was admitted to the bar in 1850. Wright was a county judge. He served in the Wisconsin State Assembly in 1853 and in the Wisconsin State Senate in 1851 and 1852. He was elected Superintendent of Public Instruction of Wisconsin. Wright died of chronic bronchitis at his home in Prairie du Chien while in office on May 27, 1855.
