= William J. Clapp =

American politician

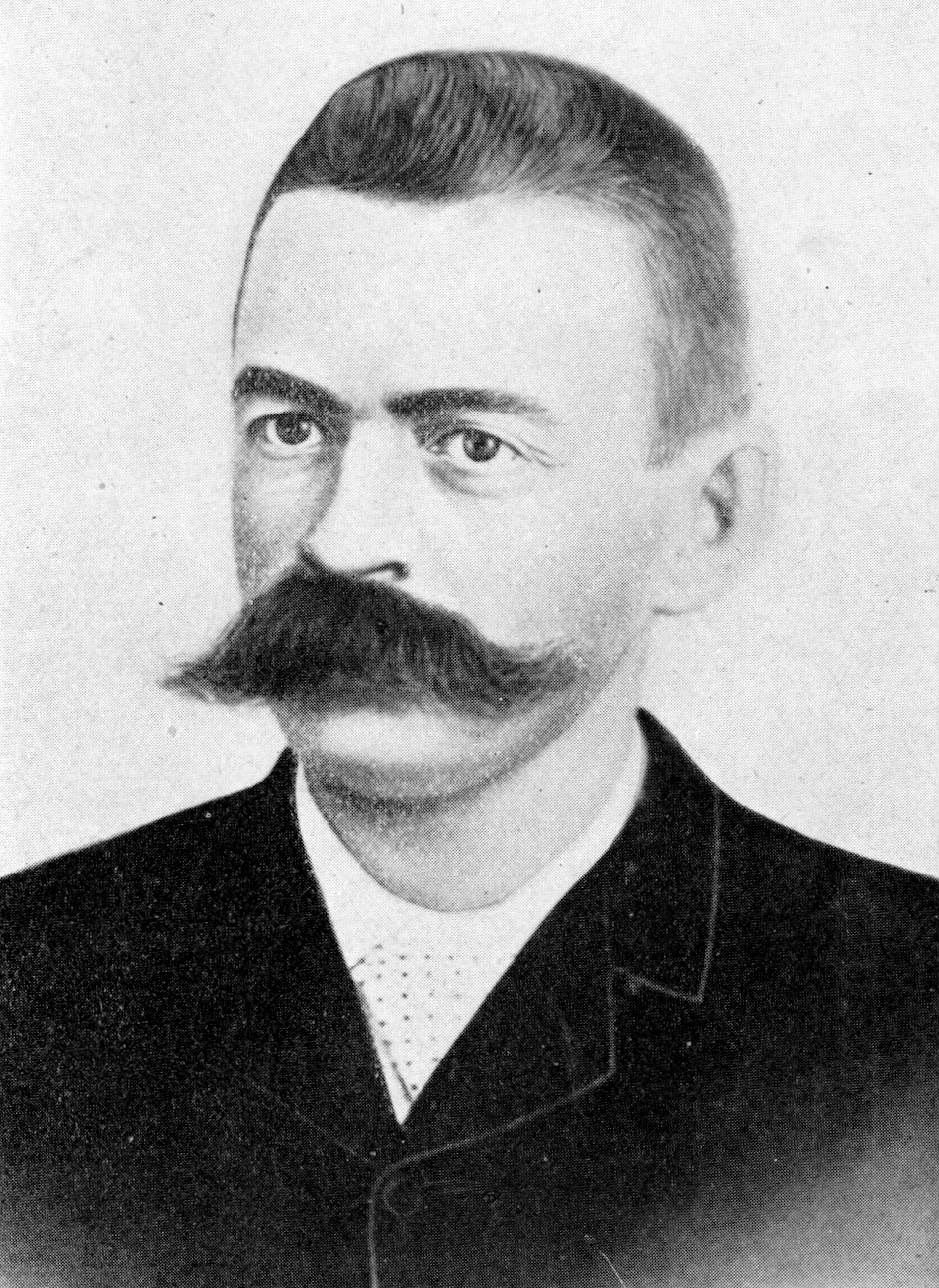

2nd North Dakota Superintendent of Public Instruction
- In office 1890–1890
- Preceded by: William Mitchell
- Succeeded by: John Ogden

Personal details
- Born: William Joshua Clapp; November 28, 1857 Middlesex County, Massachusetts, US
- Died: August 28, 1934 (aged 76) Fargo, North Dakota, US
- Party: Republican
- Spouse: Susan Stevens

William Joshua Clapp (November 28, 1857 – August 28, 1934) was a North Dakota lawyer, politician, and public servant who served as the second North Dakota Superintendent of Public Instruction in 1890.

== Biography ==
William J. Clapp was born on November 28, 1857, in Middlesex County, Massachusetts. He was the son of George L. and Harriet (Fuller) Clapp, who were natives of Vermont. He received his education there at the Vermont Seminary. In 1882, he married Susan Stevens, and they had two children: Fannie and Henry.

In 1882, he moved west and settled in Moorhead, Minnesota, where he was admitted to the bar in November 1883. In 1884, he moved to Dakota Territory and opened a law office in Tower City, where he also served on the local school board. In 1889, he was elected as a Republican member of the North Dakota Constitutional Convention.

When William Mitchell was elected to serve as the first North Dakota Superintendent of Public Instruction, he vacated the superintendent of schools in Cass County position. Clapp was appointed to complete the Cass County superintendent term. Following the sudden death of Mitchell in 1890, Clapp was appointed to fill the remainder of the term and served as the second North Dakota Superintendent of Public Instruction. Frederick W. Cathro stayed on as Deputy Superintendent of Public Instruction. Clapp was defeated by John Ogden for the nomination at the 1890 Republican Convention.

After his time with the Department of Public Instruction, Clapp returned to Fargo and continued to practice law. He was a prominent lawyer in the Fargo area and was a member of the Cass County Bar Association.

William J. Clapp died on August 28, 1934, in Fargo, North Dakota. He is buried at Craftsbury Common Cemetery in Craftsbury, Vermont.

== See also ==
- List of North Dakota superintendents of public instruction
- North Dakota Department of Public Instruction
