= Alexander J. Craig =

American educator and politician (1823–1870)

8th Superintendent of Public Instruction of Wisconsin
- In office January 8, 1868 – July 6, 1870
- Preceded by: John G. McMynn
- Succeeded by: Samuel Fallows

Personal details
- Born: November 11, 1823 Wallkill, New York
- Died: July 6, 1870 (aged 46)

Alexander J. Craig (November 11, 1823 – July 6, 1870) was an American educator and politician from Wisconsin.

Born in Wallkill, New York, Craig was self-educated. He moved to Palmyra, Wisconsin in 1843 where he taught school and farmed. He was the editor of the 'Journal of Wisconsin Education' published by the state of Wisconsin. In 1860, he was President of the Wisconsin Teachers Association. In 1859, he served in the Wisconsin State Assembly. He then became assistant supervisor of public instruction 1860–1867. During the American Civil War, Craig served in the 40th Wisconsin Volunteer Infantry Regiment. He was elected Superintendent of Public Instruction of Wisconsin and served from 1868 until his death in office.
