= Christian W. Slagle =

American academic administrator (1821–1882)

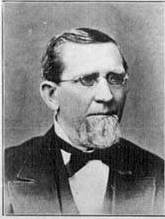
- Born: November 17, 1821
- Died: October 10, 1882 (aged 60)

Christian W. Slagle (November 17, 1821 – October 10, 1882) was an acting president of the University of Iowa, serving from 1877 to 1878. Prior to that, he served on the board of regents from 1849 to 1853, and again from 1866 onward. During his tenure as president pro tempore, he secured the first permanent endowment from the state of Iowa.

Academic offices
Preceded by George Thacher	Acting President of the University of Iowa; 1877–1878	Succeeded by Josiah Little Pickard
