= Edward Parmelee Smith =

American educator

18th Commissioner of Indian Affairs
- In office 1873–1875
- President: Ulysses S. Grant
- Preceded by: Francis Amasa Walker
- Succeeded by: John Quincy Smith

Personal details
- Born: June 1827
- Died: July 27, 1876 (age 49)
- Party: Republican
- Spouse: Hannah Cleveland
- Children: 2

Edward Parmelee Smith (1827–1876) was a Congregational minister in Massachusetts before becoming Field Secretary for the United States Christian Commission during the American Civil War. In official positions with the American Missionary Association (AMA), he was a co-founder of Fisk University and other historically black colleges established in the South for the education of freedmen. Beginning in 1873, he served as commissioner of Indian Affairs under President Ulysses S. Grant. In 1875, he was selected president of Howard University, but died on a trip in Africa in 1876 before taking office.

== Early life and education ==
Born in South Britain, Connecticut in June 1827, Edward Parmelee Smith was educated at New England schools and colleges: Andover, Dartmouth College and Yale University, where he graduated from the Theological Seminary.

== Marriage and family ==
Smith married Hannah Cleveland (1828-1898) and they had one daughter, Mary Gertrude Smith Crawford (1859-1930) His wife always shared his labors; during the American Civil War she worked in hospitals and the field. Their infant son Clarke died in the field in Nashville, TN on 3 May 1964

== Career ==
Rev. Smith was for some years a pastor at a Congregational Church in Pepperell, Massachusetts. During the American Civil War he expanded his religious work among soldiers as part of the United States Christian Commission. He headed a field division. In 1869 he published Incidents of the Christian Commission, an account of its work in hospitals and on the battlefield.

After the war, Smith was recruited for the American Missionary Association, which was working to found schools for freedmen throughout the South, as education was one of the critical needs. Rev. Smith was appointed a General Field Agent, headquartered in New York, but with charge for its work in the southern states. With John Ogden, the superintendent of education of the Freedmen's Bureau in Tennessee, and Rev. Erastus Milo Cravath of the AMA, in 1866 Smith founded the Fisk School (future Fisk University) in Nashville, Tennessee. Smith and Cravath founded schools in Atlanta, Georgia; and other cities in Georgia, Tennessee and Kentucky.

In 1871 Smith was asked by the US government to investigate needs of American Indians in Minnesota. He spent time among the Pillagers and Chippewa and reported back to Washington. In 1873 President Ulysses S. Grant appointed Smith, a Republican, US Commissioner of Indian Affairs. During tumultuous times, he enjoyed Grant's support, even through charges of extortion and corruption in his department. Smith was cleared of the charges during an investigation. During his tenure, he showed a more generous religious spirit than some of the Indian agents; for instance, he overrode one in Idaho to allow Catholic priests to hold services for Indians near the agency. In that area, more Native Americans were Catholic than Protestant.

When the Secretary of the Interior resigned in 1875, Smith did as well. He was then elected to the presidency of Howard University, one of the historically black colleges jointly founded by the AMA and the Freedmen's Bureau.

Before he started in office, Smith traveled to Africa to visit the mission field of the American Missionary Association. After traveling in Gambia and Sierra Leone, he came down with a fever at Good Hope Station on Sheroro Island near Accra. He died there about three weeks later on July 27, 1876.
