= Skirmish at Paint Rock Bridge =

Battle of the American Civil War

- Part of the American Civil War
| Date | April 28, 1862 |
| Location | Jackson County, Alabama 34°37′33.7″N 86°18′21.5″W |
| Result | Union victory |

Belligerents
| United States (Union) | (Confederate States of America) CSA (Confederacy) |

Commanders and leaders
| Ormsby M. Mitchel | Danville Leadbetter |

Strength
| 27 | 250 |

Casualties and losses
| 7 Killed | 7 Killed, 1 wounded |
- Location within Alabama Skirmish (the United States)

The Skirmish at Paint Rock Bridge was an action fought between a Union Army detachment of 27 men guarding a bridge near Woodville, Alabama and a Confederate States Army cavalry detachment intent on destroying the railroad bridge on April 28, 1862, during the American Civil War. Union Army brigade commander Colonel Joshua W. Sill reported that the men from the 10th Wisconsin Volunteer Infantry Regiment, commanded by Colonel Arnold R. Chapin, who were under the immediate command of Sergeant William Nelson and Sergeant Augustus H. Makimson held off the Confederate force of 250 men for over two hours and killed 7 Confederates and captured 1 wounded Confederate soldier who told the Union men of the Confederate numbers and casualties. The action resulted in the Union maintaining control of an intact railroad line through the area.
