= Birney Maries Jarvis =

American politician

Birney Maries Jarvis was an American politician. He was a member of the Wisconsin State Assembly.

== Biography ==
Jarvis was born on June 27, 1845, in Africa, Ohio. During the American Civil War, he served with the 23rd Wisconsin Volunteer Infantry Regiment of the Union Army. Engagements he took part in include the Battle of Grand Gulf, the Battle of Port Gibson, the Battle of Jackson, Mississippi, the Battle of Champion Hill, the Battle of Big Black River Bridge, the Siege of Vicksburg and the Battle of Spanish Fort.

== Assembly career ==
Jarvis was a member of the Assembly in 1881. He was a Republican.
