= Burnley (disambiguation) =

Burnley is a large market town in Lancashire, England.

Burnley may also refer to:

== People ==
- Burnley (surname)
- Burnley "Rocky" Jones (1941–2013), Canadian political activist in the areas of human rights, race and poverty

== Places ==
=== Australia ===
- Burnley, Victoria, a suburb of Melbourne
  - Burnley railway station

=== Canada ===
- Burnley, Ontario, a community in township of Alnwick/Haldimand

=== England ===
- Borough of Burnley
- Burnley (UK Parliament constituency)

=== United States ===
- Burnley, Virginia

== Sports ==
- Burnley F.C., a football club based in Burnley, Lancashire

== See also ==
- Burnlee, a village in West Yorkshire, England
