= Duane Doty =

American politician

4th Superintendent of Chicago Public Schools
- In office June 1877 – June 25, 1880
- Preceded by: Josiah Little Pickard
- Succeeded by: George C. Howland

Superintendent of Detroit Public Schools
- In office 1864–1875
- Succeeded by: John M. B. Sill

Personal details
- Born: c. 1836 Ohio
- Died: November 17, 1902 Pullman, Illinois
- Party: Democratic
- Education: University of Michigan

Duane Doty (c. 1836–November 17, 1902) was an American educator, civil engineer, and administrator that served as superintendent of the public school systems in Detroit and Chicago, and who worked for the Pullman Car Company as the town manager of their company town of Pullman, Illinois.

== Early life ==
Doty was born in 1834 in Ohio. His father was Samuel Doty. Doty attended the University of Michigan, graduating in 1856.

== Career ==
=== Educational ===
Doty was hired in 1864 as superintendent of schools in Detroit. He held this job for ten years. Because the state's only normal school, the Michigan State Normal School, was producing an insufficient number of teachers to meet the demand in Detroit, in 1868 Doty launched an experimental teacher training course that was offered to select female seniors at Detroit high schools. Doty also attempted, unsuccessfully, to create a normal school in Detroit. Doty also served a stint as the secretary of the Detroit Board of Education.

Doty was a staunch Democrat. In 1868, 1870 and 1874, Doty was the party's nominee for Michigan Superintendent of Public Instruction. In 1874, his candidacy was also backed by the Independent Reform Party.

In January 1875, Doty joined the book buying firm of E. B. Smith & Co. He resigned as superintendent. Later in 1875, Doty moved to Chicago to serve as assistant superintendent of Chicago Public Schools, a job he was appointed to by the Chicago Board of Education on September 14 of that year. From 1877 until 1880, he served as superintendent of Chicago Public Schools. He was appointed in June 1877 after the resignation of Josiah Little Pickard, who alleged that the Chicago Board of Education had pushed him out in order to appoint Doty, an allegation which Doty denied was true. On June 25, 1880, Doty was removed from office by the Chicago Board of Education, which installed Central High School principal George R. Howland as his successor. When the Board voted on a superintendent Doty had received four votes to Howland's nine votes.

In 1885, Doty submitted an application with the United States Department of the Interior seeking to be appointed as United States commissioner of education.

=== Pullman Car Company ===
After being fired as superintendent, Doty left the field of education, taking a job with the Pullman Car Company. He would serve as the inaugural town manager of the company town of Pullman, Illinois. Working as a civil engineer, he surveyed and plotted the layout of the town. He is also believed to possibly have shaped the vision for the town's schools. His wife, Margarita Doty, was involved in Pullman as well, including being responsible for writing an 1893 guide to the town, which spoke glowingly of it.

Doty conducted reports and studies about railroads for the Pullman Car Company. Doty also, anonymously, did publicity work for Pullman Car Company.

== Death ==
Doty died November 17, 1902, at his daughter's home in Pullman. He was survived by his daughter and his son.

== Legacy ==
The Duane Doty School in Detroit is named for Doty. Doty Avenue, in the Pullman area of Chicago, is named for Doty.
