= Josiah Little Pickard =

American politician (1824–1914)

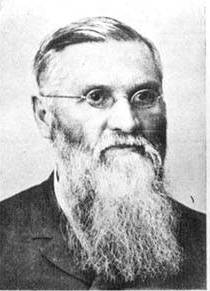

6th President of the University of Iowa
- In office 1878–1887
- Preceded by: Christian W. Slagle (acting)
- Succeeded by: Charles Ashmead Schaeffer

3rd Superintendent of Chicago Public Schools
- In office June 1864 – June 1877
- Preceded by: William H. Wells
- Succeeded by: Duane Doty

6th Superintendent of Public Instruction of Wisconsin
- In office January 2, 1860 – September 30, 1864
- Governor: Alexander W. Randall; Louis P. Harvey; Edward Salomon; James T. Lewis
- Preceded by: Lyman Draper
- Succeeded by: John G. McMynn

Personal details
- Born: March 17, 1824 Rowley, Massachusetts, U.S.
- Died: March 28, 1914 (aged 90) Santa Clara County, California, U.S.
- Party: Republican
- Spouse: Cornelia Van Cleve Woodhull (m. 1847; died 1900)
- Occupation: educator, politician

Josiah Little Pickard (March 17, 1824 – March 28, 1914) was an American educator, school system administrator, and public education pioneer. He served as the 6th Superintendent of Public Instruction of Wisconsin (1860–1864), the 3rd Superintendent of Chicago Public Schools (1864–1877), and the 6th president of the University of Iowa (1878–1887).

== Biography ==
Born in Rowley, Massachusetts, Pickard grew up on a farm near Brunswick, Maine, and went to Lewiston Falls Academy in Maine. He graduated from Bowdoin College in 1844. In 1845, he moved west and then moved to Wisconsin, in 1864, and was principal of Platteville Academy now University of Wisconsin–Platteville. From 1860 until 1864, Pickard was Superintendent of Public Instruction of Wisconsin. During that time he was on the University of Wisconsin Board of Regents.

In 1864, he resigned as Superintendent of Public Instruction and moved to Chicago, Illinois, to be head of the public school system, a job he began in June of that year. He served until resigning in June 1877 (he alleged that the school board had forced him out in order to appoint his assistant superintendent Duane Doty, which Doty denied).

Finally, he went to the University of Iowa and served as president until his retirement in 1887. He also was President of the State Historical Society of Iowa. After 1889, he retired and from 1900, Pickard lived in retirement with his daughter in Cupertino, California.

Pickard died at his daughter's home in Cupertino after falling from a streetcar and breaking his leg. He was buried in Chicago.

== Notes ==
Party political offices
| Preceded by John G. McMynn | Republican nominee for Superintendent of Public Instruction of Wisconsin; 1859, 1861, 1863 | Succeeded by John G. McMynn |
Political offices
| Preceded by Lyman Draper | Superintendent of Public Instruction of Wisconsin; 1860–1864 | Succeeded by John G. McMynn |
Academic offices
| Preceded by Christian W. Slagle (acting); George Thacher | President of the University of Iowa; 1878–1887 | Succeeded by Charles Ashmead Schaeffer |
