= William Mitchell (North Dakota politician) =

American politician

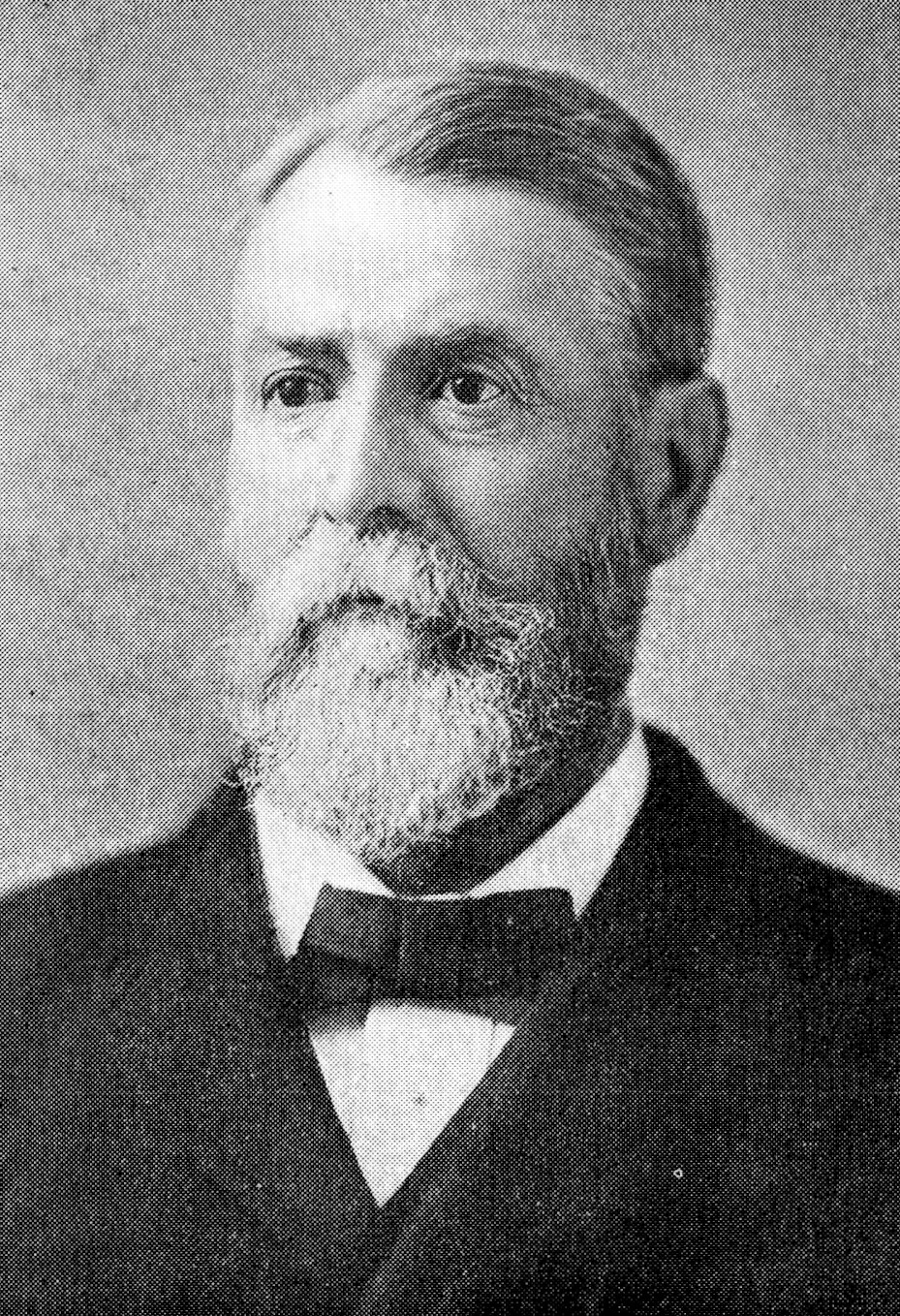

1st North Dakota Superintendent of Public Instruction
- In office 1889–1890
- Succeeded by: William J. Clapp

Personal details
- Born: William Mitchell Knox County, Ohio
- Died: March 10, 1890 Bismarck, North Dakota
- Party: Republican
- Spouse: Catharine Haller

William Mitchell was an educator, Civil War veteran, and North Dakota public servant who served as the first North Dakota Superintendent of Public Instruction from 1889 until his sudden death in 1890.

== Biography ==
William Mitchell was born near Mount Vernon in Knox County, Ohio. His birth year is disputed. Some sources claim 1828 or 1829, and other sources claim it was 1830. William was the oldest of nine children born to Rev. John Mitchell and Anne (Ogden) Mitchell. He married Catharine Haller in 1854 and they had three children.

During the Civil War, Mitchell was employed as a teacher in Ohio. He left the classroom and served as a captain in Company A of the 96th Ohio Infantry Regiment. From then on, he preferred to be called "Captain" Mitchell. He served as superintendent of instruction in Columbus, Ohio, for several years.

In 1883, he moved to Fargo, North Dakota. In 1887, he was elected superintendent of schools in Cass County. He became instrumental in calling the first education association meeting, which eventually become the North Dakota Education Association. When North Dakota was admitted to the Union in 1889, the state's constitution created the office of the Superintendent of Public Instruction, and the position was made an elective office for a two-year term. In 1889, William Mitchell became the first Superintendent of Public Instruction for North Dakota. During his short time in office, he became well liked and respected.

During his long career as an educator, he worked as a teacher, college professor, instructor, city superintendent, State Examiner, county superintendent, and State Superintendent. He also had experience in the legal field.

On the evening of March 10, 1890, William Mitchell died suddenly of heart failure at his residence on Second Street in Bismarck, North Dakota. His deputy, Frederick W. Cathro, became interim superintendent until William J. Clapp was appointed to complete Mitchell's term in office.

William Mitchell is buried at Mound View Cemetery in Mount Vernon, Ohio.

== See also ==
- List of North Dakota superintendents of public instruction
- North Dakota Department of Public Instruction
