= John Ogden (academic) =

American abolitionist and school founder

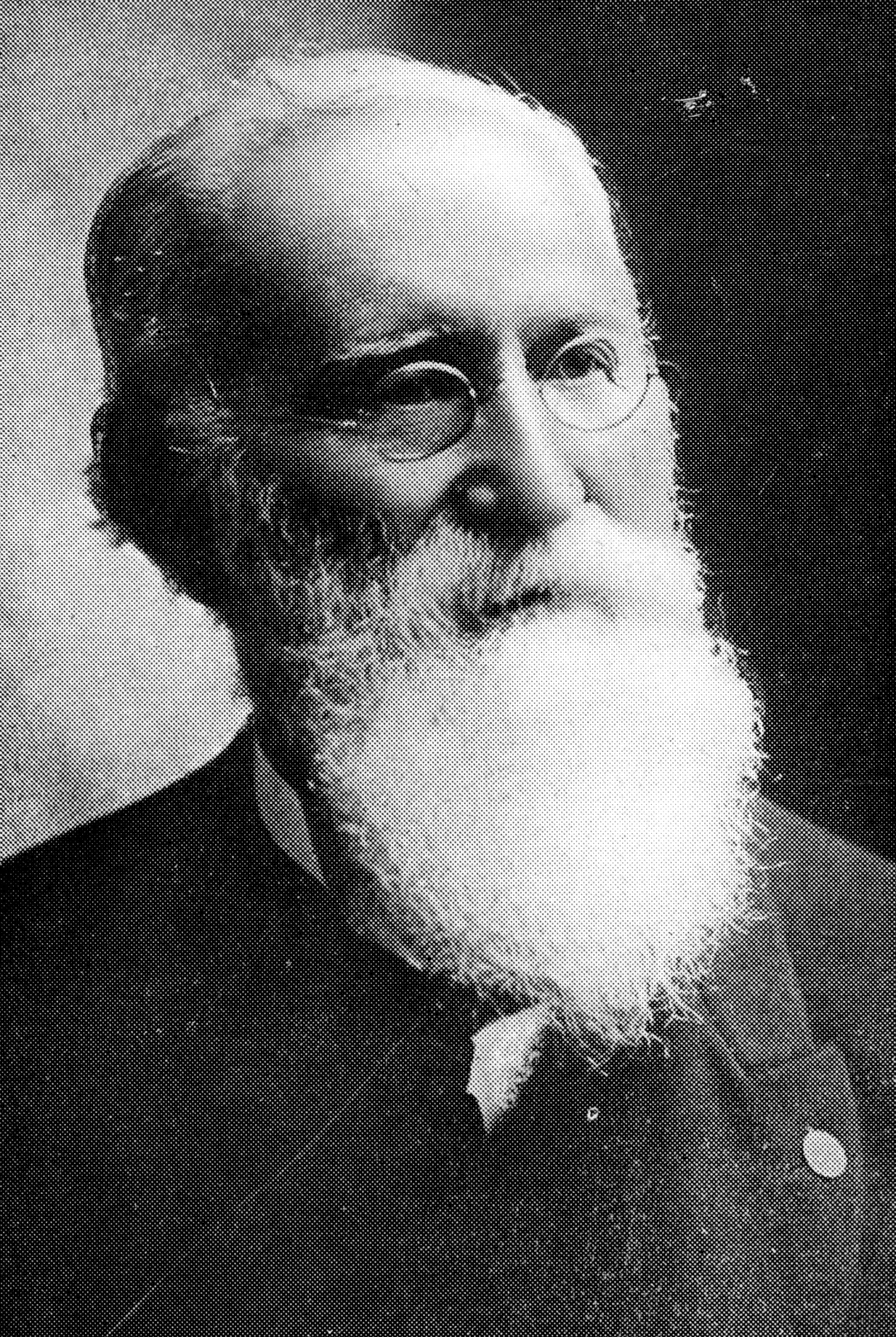
- Ogden in 1891/2

1st Principal of First State Normal School of Minnesota
- In office September 3, 1860 – December 14, 1861
- Succeeded by: Vacant (1861-1864); John G. McMynn (1864)

Principal and President of Fisk University
- In office 1866–1870

3rd North Dakota Superintendent of Public Instruction
- In office 1891–1892
- Preceded by: William J. Clapp
- Succeeded by: Laura J. Eisenhuth

Personal details
- Born: February 12, 1824 Ohio, US
- Died: July 23, 1910 (aged 86) Seattle, Washington, US
- Spouse(s): Mary Jane Mitchell, Anna Augusta Brewster
- Occupation: educator, academic administrator

John Ogden (February 12, 1824 – July 23, 1910) was an American military officer, minister, veteran educator, and abolitionist. He served in the Union Army during the American Civil War, being captured in 1864 and held prisoner until the conflict ended. He became an education official with the Freedmen's Bureau in Tennessee and co-founded a school for African Americans, Fisk School, that preceded Fisk University. He also served as the third North Dakota Superintendent of Public Instruction in the early 1890s.

== Early life ==
John Ogden was born on February 12, 1824 in Mount Vernon, Ohio. His family farmed. He was baptized as a Baptist.

== Early teaching career ==
Ogden began teaching at a common school in Crestline, Ohio in 1842. Throughout the 1840s he continued to teach in small schools until he was named principal of a grammar school in Columbus. From 1853 to 1855, he attended Ohio Wesleyan University and also served as an instructor there. In 1860, he moved to Minnesota from Ohio and served as the founding principal of the Winona State Normal School (later known as Winona State University). In December of 1861, he resigned from his position in Winona, after only three semesters.

== Military career ==
Not long after arriving at Winona State Normal School, Ogden enlisted to fight in the American Civil War. He served in the 1st Wisconsin Cavalry Regiment. He received commissions as a second lieutenant, first lieutenant, and captain, but was captured by the Confederacy in 1864 and was held prisoner until the war ended. He was held as a prisoner of war in South Carolina and Georgia. At one point, he did escape but was recaptured.

== Fisk University ==
In 1865, Ogden joined with Erastus Milo Cravath and Edward Parmelee Smith of the American Missionary Association to create a school in Nashville for the education of men and women "irrespective of color". On January 9, 1866, they opened the Fisk School, named for Freedmen's Bureau official Clinton B. Fisk. Ogden served as the school's first principal, and on August 12, 1867, a charter was signed, transforming the institution into Fisk University.

== Later career ==
After serving as principal of Fisk School, and later president of Fisk University, Ogden moved back to Ohio. During the 1870s and early 1880s, he worked as principal for colleges and normal schools. Before moving to Dakota Territory, he lived in Washington, D.C. for a few years in the 1880s.

In 1887, Ogden moved to Dakota Territory (modern-day North Dakota) and lived on a homestead in McIntosh County. He briefly served as the superintendent of schools in McIntosh County. He later moved to Sargent County and served as the principal of the Milnor State Normal School in Milnor, North Dakota.

In 1890, Ogden received the Republican nomination for Superintendent of Public Instruction over William J. Clapp. In 1891, he was elected North Dakota Superintendent of Public Instruction. He served a two-year term, ending in 1892, and did not seek reelection. Frederick W. Cathro stayed on with Ogden and served again as Deputy Superintendent of Public Instruction.

== Personal life ==
In 1849, John Ogden married Mary Jane Mitchell in Ohio. They later divorced after the Civil War in the 1860s. In 1866, he married Anna Augusta Brewster, a former pupil at Winona State Normal School, in Saint Paul, Minnesota.

Following his retirement in 1892, Ogden lived in Minneapolis. He moved to Seattle in 1907. He died there on July 23, 1910.

== See also ==
- List of North Dakota superintendents of public instruction

== Works cited ==
- Cohen, Rodney T. (2001). Fisk University. Arcadia Publishing. ISBN 9780738506777.
- McDaniel, Dennis K. (1997). "John Ogden, Abolitionist and Leader in Southern Education". Transactions of the American Philosophical Society. 87 (6): i–viii+1–138. doi:10.2307/1006637. JSTOR 1006637.
