= Alfred Constantine Barry =

19th century American educator, minister, and politician

A. Constantine Barry

4th Superintendent of Public Instruction of Wisconsin
- In office June 26, 1855 – January 4, 1858
- Appointed by: William A. Barstow
- Preceded by: Hiram A. Wright
- Succeeded by: Lyman Draper

Member of the Wisconsin State Assembly from the Kenosha district
- In office January 4, 1864 – January 2, 1865
- Preceded by: Benjamin T. Hatch
- Succeeded by: Zalmon G. Simmons

Personal details
- Born: July 15, 1815 Walton, New York, U.S.
- Died: March 5, 1888 (aged 72) Lodi, Wisconsin, U.S.
- Resting place: Mount Pleasant Cemetery, Lodi, Wisconsin
- Party: Democratic; Natl. Union (1863–1866)
- Spouses: Adelia Robinson (m. 1836; died 1877); Helen Peterson
- Children: with Adelia Robinson; Malon P. Barry^{(b. 1836; died 1911)}; Melville A. Barry^{(b. 1840; died 1925)}; Isabella B. (Warner)^{(b. 1850; died 1930)}; with Helen Peterson; Jennie A. Barry

Military service
- Allegiance: United States
- Branch/service: United States Volunteers; Union Army
- Years of service: 1861–1862; 1864–1865
- Rank: Chaplain
- Unit: 4th Reg. Wis. Vol. Infantry; 19th Reg. Wis. Vol. Infantry
- Battles/wars: American Civil War

Alfred Constantine Barry (July 15, 1815 – March 5, 1888) was an American educator, politician, Universalist minister, and Wisconsin pioneer. He was Wisconsin's 4th superintendent of public instruction (1855–1858) and served one term in the Wisconsin State Assembly, representing Kenosha County during the 1864 term. During the American Civil War he served as a Union Army chaplain and recruiter. His name was generally abbreviated as A. Constantine Barry.

== Biography ==
A. Constantine Barry was born at Walton, New York, and moved with his parents to Victor, New York, when he was a child. He was raised there and educated by private tutors. He was ordained a Universalist minister in 1836 and pastored for ten years at various locations around New York before bringing his ministry to Racine, Wisconsin Territory, in 1846. In Racine, he started a temperance magazine, the Old Oaken Bucket, and became involved in local education matters, serving as the first supervisor of the public schools in Racine from 1849 through 1853.

In June 1855, he was appointed Superintendent of Public Instruction of Wisconsin by Governor William A. Barstow, to fill the vacancy caused by the death of Hiram A. Wright. Later that year, he went on to win a full term as Superintendent in the Fall general election. He did not run for re-election in 1857. He was an advocate of the educational theories of Horace Mann, and supported the creation of district normal schools and teacher's institutes, and the consolidation of school districts.

He was a member of the Democratic Party and was a guest at the inauguration of James Buchanan in 1857. During his visit to Washington, D.C., he was one of several dozen guests stricken by the "National Hotel disease"—which some suspected was an attempted poisoning—and suffered from after-effects of the disease for the rest of his life.

At the outbreak of the American Civil War, he volunteered for service in the Union Army and was enrolled as chaplain of the 4th Wisconsin Infantry Regiment, serving one year in that role. On his return to Wisconsin, he served on the local recruiting board.

In the 1863 general election, he was elected to the Wisconsin State Assembly, representing Kenosha County in the 17th Wisconsin Legislature. In April 1864, after the end of the legislative session, he returned to active duty as chaplain for the 19th Wisconsin Infantry Regiment, and served ten months with that regiment before receiving an appointment from President Abraham Lincoln to serve as chaplain of the United States Hospitals.

He mustered out of federal service in August 1865. After the war, Barry and his family resided at Fond du Lac, Wisconsin, for four years, then moved to Elkhorn, Wisconsin, where he established a church. He finally moved to Lodi, Wisconsin, in 1878, where he resided for the rest of his life.

He died at his home in Lodi on March 5, 1888.

== Electoral history ==
=== Wisconsin Superintendent (1855) ===
Wisconsin Superintendent of Public Instruction Election, 1855
Party	Candidate	Votes	%	±%
General Election, November 6, 1855
Democratic	A. Constantine Barry	38,389	52.63%	−4.64%
Republican	John G. McMynn	34,550	47.37%	
Plurality		3,839	5.26%	-9.27%
Total votes		72,939	100.0%	+35.16%
Democratic hold				

Party political offices
Preceded by Hiram A. Wright	Democratic nominee for Superintendent of Public Instruction of Wisconsin; 1855	Succeeded by Lyman Draper
Wisconsin State Assembly
Preceded by Benjamin T. Hatch	Member of the Wisconsin State Assembly from the Kenosha district January 4, 1864 – January 2, 1865	Succeeded by Zalmon G. Simmons
Political offices
Preceded by Hiram A. Wright	Superintendent of Public Instruction of Wisconsin; June 26, 1855 – January 4, 1858	Succeeded by Lyman Draper
