= Kenneth S. Burnley =

American school administrator

Kenneth Stephen Burnley (April 20, 1942 – July 2, 2011), was superintendent of the Matanuska-Susitna Borough School District in Palmer, Alaska, from July 2010 until his death in July 2011. He was a senior resident fellow at the University of Michigan School of Education. He also was the superintendent of the Detroit Public Schools from 2000 to 2005, Colorado Springs District 11 Schools, and Fairbanks North Star Borough School District in Fairbanks, Alaska.

== Accomplishments ==
Named Superintendent of the year by the American Association of School Administrators. In 2008, he was a finalist for the Eastern Michigan University presidential search.

First African-American track coach at the University of Michigan in 1968.

Desegregated the Ypsilanti Public Schools.

== Death ==
Burnley died on Saturday July 3, 2011, from complications following knee surgery earlier in the week. He was survived by Eileen his wife, and two children.
