= Joshua J. Guppey =

Union army colonel in the American Civil War

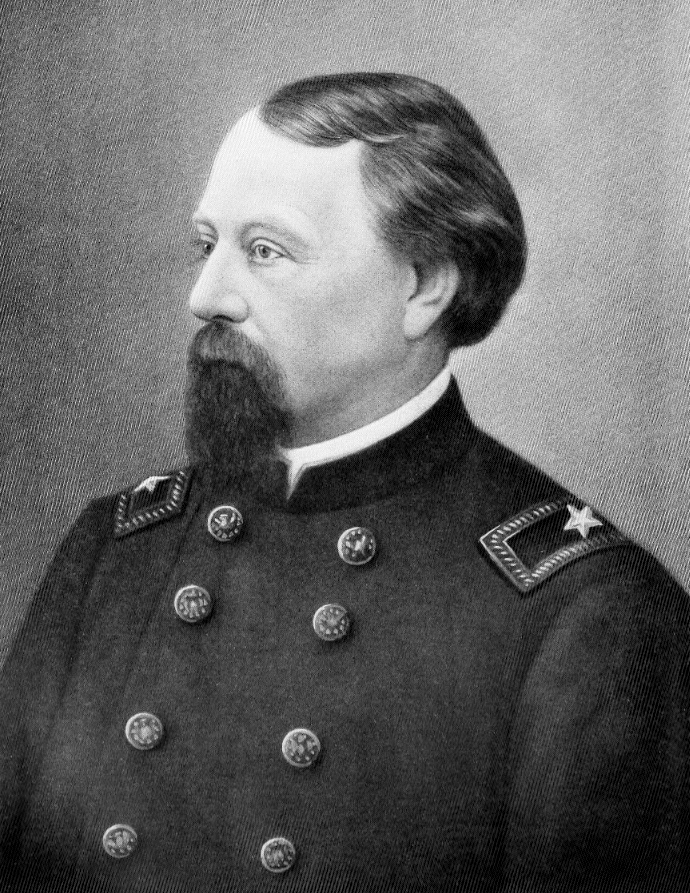

County Judge of Columbia County, Wisconsin
- In office January 2, 1865 – January 3, 1881
- Preceded by: John T. Clark
- Succeeded by: Levi W. Barden
- In office September 29, 1849 – January 5, 1857
- Appointed by: Nelson Dewey
- Preceded by: Moses R. Cobb
- Succeeded by: Guy C. Prentiss

Personal details
- Born: August 27, 1820 Dover, New Hampshire, U.S.
- Died: December 8, 1893 (aged 73) Portage, Wisconsin, U.S.
- Resting place: Pine Hill Cemetery, Dover, New Hampshire
- Party: Republican; Democratic (before 1863)
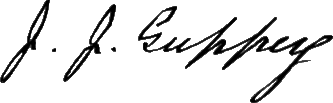
- Signature

Military service
- Allegiance: United States
- Branch/service: United States Volunteers; Union Army
- Years of service: 1861–1865
- Rank: Colonel, USV; Brevet Brig. General, USV
- Commands: 23rd Reg. Wis. Vol. Infantry
- Battles/wars: American Civil War

Joshua James Guppey (August 27, 1820 – December 8, 1893) was an American lawyer, politician, and Wisconsin pioneer. He served as a Union Army officer in the American Civil War, and received an honorary brevet to the rank of brigadier general.

== Biography ==
Guppey was born on August 27, 1820, in Dover, New Hampshire. He was a descendant of Joshua Guppey, who emigrated from England in 1720.

Guppey graduated from Dartmouth College in 1843. Guppey moved to Columbus, Wisconsin, in 1846 and opened a law practice before moving to Portage, Wisconsin, in 1849. Guppey died of influenza and pneumonia in Portage on December 8, 1893, and is interred at Pine Hill Cemetery in Dover, New Hampshire.

== Military career ==
Guppey was commissioned an officer in the Union Army in 1861 and was assigned to the 10th Wisconsin Infantry Regiment. In 1862, he was promoted to colonel and assumed command of the 23rd Wisconsin Infantry Regiment at Camp Randall. Company D of the 23rd Wisconsin was nicknamed the "Guppey Guards" or "Guppy Guards" in honor of Guppey. The regiment, with Guppey in command, later took part in the Battle of Fort Hindman and the Battle of Champion Hill. His second-in-command during the Battle of Champion Hill was future U.S. Postmaster General and Secretary of Interior William Freeman Vilas. Guppey later contracted malaria and was shot below his left knee in 1863 in the Battle of Bayou Bourbeux, which incapacitated him for a time. Afterward, he took part in the Red River Campaign. In 1865, he participated in the Battle of Fort Blakeley. Guppey was mustered out of the volunteers on July 4, 1865. On January 13, 1866, President Andrew Johnson nominated Guppey for appointment to the grade of brevet brigadier general of volunteers to rank from March 13, 1865, and the United States Senate confirmed the appointment on March 12, 1866. After the war, Guppey was active in the Wisconsin Army National Guard until retiring in 1893.

== Political career ==
Guppey became a probate judge in Columbia County, Wisconsin, in 1849. The following year, he was named a county judge and remained one until 1858. From 1858 to 1861 and again from 1866 to 1873, he was superintendent of Portage schools. In 1862, Guppey was the Democratic candidate for the United States House of Representatives from Wisconsin's 2nd congressional district. He lost to Ithamar Sloan. After the election, he changed his affiliation to the Republican Party.

Military offices
Regiment established	Command of the 23rd Wisconsin Infantry Regiment; August 30, 1862 – June 5, 1863	Succeeded by Lt. Col. William F. Vilas
Legal offices
Preceded by Moses R. Cobb	County Judge of Columbia County, Wisconsin; September 29, 1849 – January 5, 1857	Succeeded by Guy C. Prentiss
Preceded by John T. Clark	County Judge of Columbia County, Wisconsin; January 2, 1865 – January 3, 1881	Succeeded by Levi W. Barden
