= Dorothy R. Burnley =

American politician

Member of the North Carolina House of Representatives
- In office 1981–1985

Personal details
- Born: February 27, 1927 High Point, North Carolina, U.S.
- Died: April 19, 2016 (aged 89) Kingston, New York, U.S.
- Party: Republican
- Education: Hollins College
- Profession: Politician, businesswoman

Dorothy Rockwell "Dot" Burnley (February 27, 1927 – April 19, 2016) was an American businesswoman and politician.

Born in High Point, North Carolina, Burnley graduated from Jefferson High School in Roanoke, Virginia. She went to Hollins College from 1944 to 1946. Burnley was in the furniture business. From 1981 to 1985, Burnley served in the North Carolina House of Representatives and was a Republican. Burnley died in Kingston, New York where she had been living with her family for fifteen years.
