= Boykin Continuing Education Center =

Alternative school

Coordinates: 42.3866°N 83.0928°W

Nancy M. Boykin Continuing Education Center was an alternative school for teenage mothers in Detroit, Michigan, United States. The school offered on site child care, nutritional meals, counseling and after school activities. It closed in 2010. It was a part of Detroit Public Schools.

In addition Boykin offered a state licensed nursery/developmental center for infants and toddlers from the age of three weeks to three years. Enrollment was for grades 7-12.
