= Lyman Draper =

19th century American soldier and politician

Lyman C. Draper
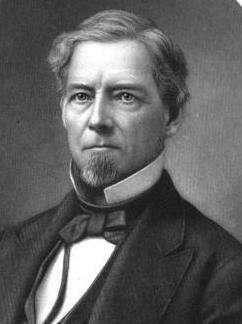

5th Superintendent of Public Instruction of Wisconsin
- In office January 4, 1858 – January 2, 1860
- Governor: Alexander Randall
- Preceded by: A. Constantine Barry
- Succeeded by: Josiah Little Pickard

Personal details
- Born: Lyman Copeland Draper; September 4, 1815 Evans, New York
- Died: August 26, 1891 (aged 75) Madison, Wisconsin
- Resting place: Forest Hill Cemetery; Madison, Wisconsin
- Spouses: Lydia Chadwick; (m. 1853; died 1888)
- Parents: Luke Draper (father); Harriet (Hoisington) Draper (mother)

Lyman Copeland Draper (September 4, 1815 – August 26, 1891) was a librarian and historian who served as secretary for the State Historical Society of Wisconsin at Madison, Wisconsin. Draper also served as Superintendent of Public Instruction of Wisconsin from 1858 to 1860.

== Biography ==
Lyman Copeland Draper was born on September 4, 1815, in Evans, New York, a descendant of early Massachusetts settler James Draper (1622–1697). Growing up he often heard about the exploits of his grandfathers and father in the Revolution and the War of 1812. He developed a keen interest in the history of those times. Starting in the 1838, Lyman Draper corresponded with people who were early settlers in the Trans-Allegheny region during the second half of the 18th century. He also traveled extensively in the region to gain a better feel for the territory. Draper's professed purpose was to shed light on the era and gain knowledge before it was completely forgotten. He planned to write a series of biographies on early settlers in the region and document the Indian Wars in the Ohio River Valley.

Although Draper never finished his biographies, his correspondence with survivors of the time and their relatives provide the largest single first-hand account of the settlement of the region. He published 10 volumes of historical notes for the Wisconsin Historical Society, as well as a volume about the Battle of King's Mountain (1780). This featured many of the early settlers.

Draper was elected a member of the American Antiquarian Society in 1877.

He died on August 26, 1891, in Madison, Wisconsin.

== Lyman Draper Manuscript Collection ==
The Lyman Draper Manuscript Collection includes his extensive notes and correspondence as well as the works and papers of a number of notable early Americans, collected by Lyman Draper on the history of the trans-Allegheny West. This area includes portions of the Carolinas, Virginia, Georgia, Alabama, the entire Ohio Valley, and the Mississippi Valley. Among the most notable of the figures whose papers he collected are Joseph Brant, Daniel Boone, George Rogers Clark, Thomas S. Hinde, John Donelson, James Robertson, General Joseph Martin, and Simon Kenton. Most materials cover the time period from the 1740s through the 1810s. The Draper Collection comprises nearly 500 volumes.

The State Historical Society of Wisconsin (now Wisconsin Historical Society), for which Draper served as corresponding secretary from 1854 to 1886, owns the collection of original 18th and 19th-century papers. Major research libraries around the United States have microfilm of the collection.
