= 23rd Wisconsin Infantry Regiment =

Union Army infantry regiment

- Flag of Wisconsin
- Active: August 30, 1862 – July 4, 1865
- Country: United States
- Allegiance: Union
- Branch: Infantry
- Size: Regiment
- Engagements: American Civil War: Defense of Cincinnati; Vicksburg Campaign; Battle of Chickasaw Bayou; Battle of Arkansas Post; Battle of Port Gibson (reserve); Battle of Champion Hill; Battle of Big Black River Bridge; Operations in West Louisiana; Battle of Bayou Bourbeux; Reconnaissance on Matagorda Peninsula; Red River campaign; Battle of Sabine Crossroads; Battle of Pleasant Hill; Battle of Monett's Ferry; Expedition to Bayou Sara; Mobile Campaign; Battle of Spanish Fort; Battle of Fort Blakeley

Commanders
- Colonel: Joshua James Guppey
- Lt. Colonel: William Freeman Vilas
- Lt. Colonel: Edgar P. Hill
- Major: Joseph E. Green
- Lt. Colonel: Edmund Jüssen

The 23rd Wisconsin Infantry Regiment was a volunteer infantry regiment that served in the Union Army during the American Civil War.

== Service ==
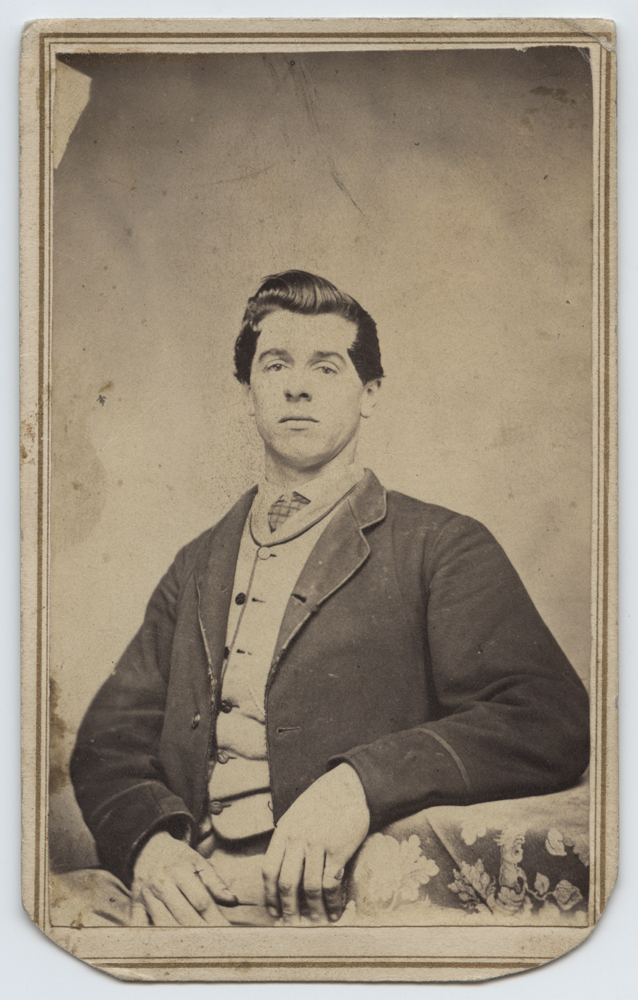
Private Albert T. Hopkins (1844-1867) of Company G from Columbus, Wisconsin. Hopkins was transferred to the 35th Wisconsin Infantry Regiment and died in 1867.

The 23rd Wisconsin was organized at Madison, Wisconsin, and mustered into Federal service on August 30, 1862.

Duty at Newport, Ky., till October 8, 1862. Moved to Paris, Ky., October 8–15, thence to Lexington and Nicholasville, Ky., October 22–31. Moved to Louisville; thence to Memphis, Tenn., November 8–27. Sherman's Yazoo Expedition December 20, 1862, to January 3, 1863. Expedition from Milliken's Bend to Louisiana & Shreveport Railroads, December 25–26. Chickasaw Bayou, December 26–28. Chickasaw Bayou, December 29. Expedition to Arkansas Post, Ark., January 3–10, 1863. Assault on and capture of Fort Hindman, Arkansas Post, January 10–11. Moved to Young's Point, La., January 15, and duty there till March 8. Expedition to Cypress Bend, Ark., February 14–29. Moved to Milliken's Bend, La., March 8, and duty there till April 25. Movement on Bruinsburg and turning Grand Gulf April 25–30. Battle of Port Gibson, May 1 (Reserve). Battle of Champion's Hill, May 16. Big Black River, May 17. Siege of Vicksburg, Miss., May 18-July 4. Assaults on Vicksburg May 19 and 22. Advance on Jackson, Miss., July 4–10. Siege of Jackson July 10–17. Camp at Vicksburg till August. Ordered to New Orleans, La., August 24. Expedition to New and Amite Rivers September 24–29. Western Louisiana Campaign October 3-November 30. Carrion Crow Bayou November 3. At New Iberia till December 7. Moved to Berwick, December 7–10. Moved to Brashear City, thence to Algiers and to Matagorda Peninsula, Texas, December 13, 1863 – January 1, 1864. Reconnoissance on Matagorda Peninsula January 21, 1864. Duty at DeCrow's Point till February 22. Moved to Algiers, La., February 22–26. Red River Campaign March 10-May 22. Advance from Franklin to Alexandria March 14–26. Bayou de Paul, Carroll's Mill, and battle of Sabine Cross Roads, April 8. Monett's Ferry, Cane River Crossing, April 23. At Alexandria April 26-May 13. Construction of dam at Alexandria April 30-May 10. Retreat to Morganza May 13–20. Mansura, May 16. Moved to Baton Rouge May 24, and duty there till July 8. Moved to Algiers, La., July 8, thence to Morganza July 26. Expedition to Mobile Bay August 18-September 2. Operations near Morganza September 16–25. Expedition to Bayou Sara October 3–6. Bayou Sara and Thompson's Creek, near Jackson, October 5. Moved to Helena, Ark., October 10, and duty there till February 23, 1865. Ordered to New Orleans, La., February 23. Campaign against Mobile, Ala., and its defences March 17-April 12. Siege of Spanish Fort and Fort Blakely March 26-April 8. Assault on and capture of Fort Blakely, April 9. Occupation of Mobile April 12. Duty at and near Mobile till July. The regiment was mustered out on July 4, 1865, at Mobile, Alabama.

Company	Earliest Moniker	Primary Place of Recruitment	Earliest Captain
A	Madison Zouaves	Madison, Fitchburg, Sun Prairie, Verona, Cottage Grove, and Dane County, Wisconsin	William F. Vilas
B	Lafayette Guards	Belmont, Darlington, and Lafayette County, Wisconsin	Charles M. Waring †
C	Portage Rifles	Portage, Fort Winnebago, Marcellon Lewiston, and Columbia County, Wisconsin	Edgar P. Hill
D	Guppy Guards	Madison, Pleasant Springs, Blue Mounds, Cottage Grove, Albion, Mazomanie, Berry, and Dane County, Wisconsin	Joseph E. Green
E	Lewis Guards	Madison, Fitchburg, Sun Prairie, Verona, Cottage Grove, Blue Mounds and Dane County, Wisconsin	James M. Bull
F	Baraboo Guards	Baraboo, Lodi, Portage, Excelsior, Westfield, and Sauk County, Wisconsin	Jacob A. Schlik
G	Columbus Guards	Columbus, Hampden, Elba, Portland, Dodge and Columbia counties	James S. Hazelton
H	Lodi Badgers	Lodi West Point, Arlington, and Columbia County, Wisconsin	Edmund Howard Erwin
I	Capitol Guards	Madison, Fitchburg, Sun Prairie, Verona, Cottage Grove, Blooming Grove and Dane County, Wisconsin	Anson R. Jones
K	Sauk Rifle Rangers	Prairie du Sac, Sauk City, Madison, Spring Green, Roxbury, and Sauk County, Wisconsin	Nathaniel S. Frost †

== Casualties ==
The 23rd Wisconsin suffered 1 officer and 40 enlisted men killed in action or who later died of their wounds, plus another 5 officers and 262 enlisted men who died of disease, for a total of 308 fatalities.

== Commanders ==
- Colonel Joshua James Guppey (August 30, 1862 – July 4, 1865) was nominal commander through the entire life of the regiment, but was absent for the second half of 1863 and first half of 1864 due to illness and injury. By the time he was well enough to return, in July 1864, he was made an acting brigade commander. After the war he received an honorary brevet to brigadier general.
  - Lt. Colonel William Freeman Vilas (June 5, 1863 – August 25, 1863) mustered in as captain of Co. A, and was promoted to major then lieutenant colonel. He had command of the regiment in the summer of 1863 when Colonel Guppey was incapacitated by illness. He resigned his commission in August 1863. After the war he became a United States senator.
  - Lt. Colonel Edgar P. Hill (August 25, 1863 – January 1864, June 1864 – January 1865) was originally captain of Co. C. He was acting commander of the regiment after the resignation of Lt. Colonel Vilas.
  - Major Joseph E. Green (January 1864 – June 1864, January 1865 – June 1865) was originally captain of Co. D. He was acting commander of the regiment while Lt. Colonel Hill was on leave in Wisconsin.

== Notable people ==
- John F. Appleby was a corporal in Co. E throughout the war. During the war, Appleby invented and patented a manual magazine feed breech loading needle gun. After the war, he invented and patented several agricultural devices.
- Joseph Bartholomew was an enlisted man in Co. H. He rose to the rank of sergeant with this company, and was then commissioned a 2nd lieutenant in the 49th Wisconsin Infantry Regiment. After the war he became chief justice of the North Dakota Supreme Court.
- Rockwell J. Flint was a sergeant in Co. C, but transferred to the Signal Corps in 1863. After the war became a Wisconsin legislator and U.S. marshal.
- Birney Maries Jarvis was enlisted in Co. A and served throughout the war. After the war he became a Wisconsin legislator.
- Edmund Jüssen was lieutenant colonel until his resignation in March 1863. After the war served as an American diplomat.
- William Seamonson was enlisted in Co. D and rose to the rank of sergeant, serving through the entire war. After the war he became a Wisconsin legislator.
- John Starks, son of Argalus Starks, was 1st lieutenant of Co. I. He was wounded in the trenches at the Siege of Vicksburg and later died of his wound. He previously served as an enlisted man in the 6th Wisconsin Infantry Regiment.
- Henry Vilas, brother of William Freeman Vilas, was 2nd lieutenant of Co. E and later captain of Co. A.

== Equipment ==
- Springfield Model 1861
- Springfield Model 1855
- Pattern 1853 Enfield

== See also ==
- List of Wisconsin Civil War units
- Wisconsin in the American Civil War
