= Harrison Ludington =

American businessman and politician

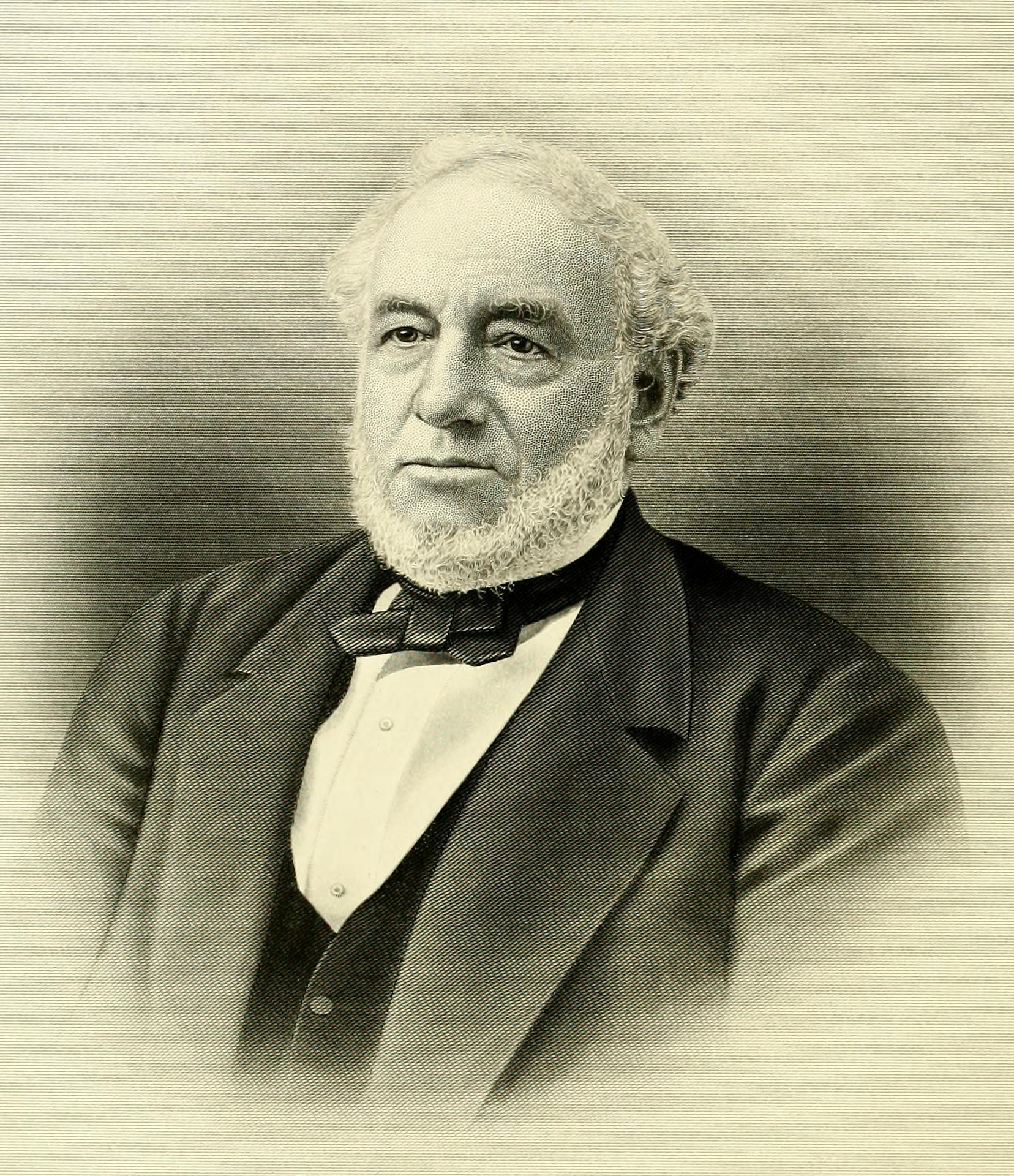

13th Governor of Wisconsin
- In office January 3, 1876 – January 7, 1878
- Lieutenant: Charles D. Parker
- Preceded by: William Robert Taylor
- Succeeded by: William E. Smith

20th & 22nd Mayor of Milwaukee
- In office April 1873 – January 3, 1876
- Preceded by: David G. Hooker
- Succeeded by: Ammi R. Butler
- In office April 1871 – April 1872
- Preceded by: Joseph Phillips
- Succeeded by: David G. Hooker

Personal details
- Born: July 30, 1812 Ludingtonville, New York, U.S.
- Died: June 17, 1891 (aged 78) Milwaukee, Wisconsin, U.S.
- Cause of death: Stroke
- Resting place: Forest Home Cemetery, Milwaukee
- Party: Republican; Whig (before 1856)
- Spouses: Frances White (m. 1838; died 1873); Eve Macy (Tobey) (m. 1875–1891)
- Children: 6
- Relatives: Nelson Ludington (brother); Henry Ludington (grandfather); Sybil Ludington (aunt); Ludington family
- Profession: businessman, politician

Harrison Ludington (July 30, 1812 – June 17, 1891) was an American businessman, Republican politician, and Wisconsin pioneer. He served as the 13th governor of Wisconsin and was the 20th and 22nd mayor of Milwaukee, Wisconsin.

== Early life and career ==
Ludington was born in Ludingtonville, Putnam County, New York, in July 1812. He was educated in the district schools in New York, then came west to the Wisconsin Territory with his uncle, Lewis Ludington, in 1838.

He became a partner with his uncle and Harvey Birchard in a merchandise business known as Ludington & Company, which operated out of a warehouse previously owned by Solomon Juneau. He continued with this business until 1851, when he became involved in a lumber business in partnership with Daniel Wells, Jr., and Anthony Van Schaick, known as Ludington, Wells, and Van Schaick. Over the next 40 years, their lumber business grew to become one of the largest lumber producers in the northwest states.

With his profits, Ludington accumulated a large amount of real estate in Milwaukee, which he developed and leased out. He also established a large farm in the town of Wauwatosa, Wisconsin, and became a leading promoter of the Wisconsin Agricultural Society.

== Political career ==
Politically, Ludington was originally a Whig, but joined the Republican Party when it was organized in 1856. He was elected to the Milwaukee Board of Aldermen in 1861 and 1862 for the 4th ward, and was elected mayor three times, in 1871, 1873, and 1874. The 1873 election, however, was quite irregular. In the spring general election, Ludington was defeated by his Democratic opponent, Levi Kellogg. However Kellogg was ruled ineligible because he was already holding another office. Kellogg resigned his other office, and a special election was called less than a month after the original election. In that special election, Ludington prevailed over Kellogg.

During his third term as Mayor, he was chosen as the Republican nominee for Governor of Wisconsin, challenging incumbent Democrat William Robert Taylor. In the 1875 general election, Ludington prevailed with a margin of just 601 votes.

In his capacity as governor, Harrison Ludington facilitated promotion of commercial activity. He also undid changes in the financial sector made by his predecessor. He stood against state regulation of railroads. Under his administration the infamous Potter law was repealed, which was supposed to drastically increase government intervention in the railroad business. He also replaced the railroad commission, made up of three members with powers of establishing rates for the railroads, by a single commissioner who lacked such authority. Ludington declined renomination for the position of governor in 1879 due to pressure from younger members of the Republican party.

== Retirement ==
Following his decision not to pursue renomination for governorship, Ludington resigned from public affairs and devoted himself to conducting business. German-American artist Conrad W. Heyd painted his portrait in this period of his life.

Ludington died at his home in Milwaukee on June 17, 1891, after suffering a stroke a week earlier. He was interred in Milwaukee's historic Forest Home Cemetery.

== Personal life and family ==
Harrison Ludington was the eldest of fifteen children born to Frederick Ludington and his wife Susannah (née Griffeth). Harrison's paternal grandfather was Colonel Henry Ludington, who commanded the 7th Regiment of Dutchess County Militia during the American Revolutionary War. He also served as an aide to General George Washington during the Battle of White Plains and served several years in the New York Legislature. Henry's daughter, Sybil Ludington (1761–1839), was famous for risking her life when she was 16 years old to warn the American militia that British troops were burning Danbury, Connecticut; these accounts, originating from the Ludington family, are questioned by modern scholars.

The Ludingtons are descendants of William Luddington, an early American colonist from England, who settled at Charlestown, Massachusetts Bay Colony, in 1632, and died at the East Haven Iron Works, Connecticut Colony, in October 1661.

Harrison Ludington married twice. He first married Frances White, on March 25, 1838, in Louisville, Kentucky. With Frances, he had two sons and four daughters before her death in 1873. On June 7, 1875, he married Emeline Tobey (née Macy), the widow of Rhodolphus H. Tobey, who survived him.

== Electoral history ==
=== Milwaukee Mayor (1871, 1873, 1874) ===
Milwaukee Mayoral Election, 1871
Party	Candidate	Votes	%	±%
General Election, April 4, 1871
Republican	Harrison Ludington	5,197	81.17%	
Democratic	Joseph Phillips (incumbent)	1,206	18.83%	
Plurality		3,991	62.33%	
Total votes		6,403	100.0%	
Republican gain from Democratic				

Milwaukee Mayoral Special Election, 1873
Party	Candidate	Votes	%	±%
Special Election, April 23, 1873
Republican	Harrison Ludington	4,982	57.26%	
Democratic	Levi H. Kellogg	3,719	42.74%	
Plurality		1,263	14.52%	
Total votes		8,701	100.0%	
Republican gain from Democratic				

=== Wisconsin Governor (1875) ===
Wisconsin Gubernatorial Election, 1875
Party	Candidate	Votes	%	±%
General Election, November 2, 1875
Republican	Harrison Ludington	85,155	50.07%	+5.28%
Democratic	William Robert Taylor (incumbent)	84,314	49.58%	−5.61%
	Scattering	601	0.35%	
Total votes		170,070	100.0%	+15.02%
Republican gain from Democratic				

== See also ==
- Nelson Ludington
- Henry Ludington
- James Ludington
- Lewis Ludington
- Ludington family

== Sources ==
- White (1904). The National Cyclopaedia of American Biography. J.T. White.

Party political offices
Preceded by Cadwallader C. Washburn	Republican nominee for Governor of Wisconsin; 1875	Succeeded by William E. Smith
Political offices
Preceded by Joseph Phillips	Mayor of Milwaukee; 1871 – 1872	Succeeded by David G. Hooker
Preceded by David G. Hooker	Mayor of Milwaukee; 1873 – 1876	Succeeded by Ammi R. Butler
Preceded by William Robert Taylor	Governor of Wisconsin; 1876 – 1878	Succeeded by William E. Smith
