= Ludington family =

American family formerly active in business, banking and politics

The Ludington family was an American family active in the fields of business, banking, and politics. Henry Ludington was active in the American Revolution, while Lewis, James, Nelson, and Harrison Ludington were involved in developing cities in the states of New York, Wisconsin, and Michigan. Harrison was a governor of Wisconsin.

== Origins ==
Author La Reiana Rule says the American name Ludington is of English origin from Luddington. She believes ancestors of the American Ludingtons were in towns in England from the 10th century. Her research indicates the name "Leodingtun" signifies "estate of the compatriot's family".

Lion Passant Guardant

Journalist Willis Fletcher Johnson says the American surname Ludington is also spelled Luddington, Ludinton, and Ludenton. He was told this family originated from the 16th-century Ludingtons of Shrawley and Worcester in England. Tradition has it that a Ludington was a follower of Richard the Lionheart in the Third Crusade and helped him plan a prison escape. This Ludington soldier received nobility status and a family coat of arms for his efforts. The coat of arms is colored in argent, azure, and gules, and emblazoned with a lion passant guardant and a crest featuring a palmer's staff. The motto reads: Probum non penitet (Honor not penitence).

== Historiography ==
According to Paula Hunt, writing in The New England Quarterly in 2015, Johnson's Colonel Henry Ludington: A Memoir was published privately by Ludington's grandchildren, Charles H. and Lavinia Elizabeth Ludington. The biography, according to Hunt, "offers a laudatory account" of the colonel's life; Hunt states that it "was certainly not of the order of Johnson’s usual projects", noting that it was omitted from his New York Times obituary. She writes that the New England Historical & Genealogical Register reviewed it as a "charming, simple memoir", which she says was intended to "remedy a belief that the Revolution-era militia and its officers had not received the recognition they deserved and to ensure the colonel's place in American history", citing page vii of the Memoirs. She characterized the work as a "not wholly reliable source".

Doubts about the family's accounts had been raised before Hunt's report, and as early as 1956.

== Genealogy ==
=== William Ludington ===
William Luddington and his wife Ellen are of unknown English origin, but are considered the base foundation of the American Ludingtons since there are confirmed history records on them. They were married about 1636. They immigrated to America about 1639 and settled in Charlestown, Massachusetts, which later became Malden, Massachusetts. Court records of 1640 show that William built his residence outside the city limits, which was illegal, and was issued a high fine for the infraction. The fine was rescinded because about this same time the law was repealed. William and Ellen raised seven children (the first born in England). After raising their children they moved to New Haven, Connecticut, around 1660, where William died shortly thereafter, as his widow remarried on May 5, 1663, to John Rose. William's will was probated May 25, 1663.

Thomas was their first child, born in 1637. John was born in 1640. Their third child was Mary, born 1642–1643. Their fourth child was Henry, who was killed in King Philip's War. Their fifth child was Hannah. Their sixth child was William II, born about 1655 who had two wives. William and Ellen's seventh child was Matthew, who died as a baby within 30 days.

William II was a businessman and married twice. His first wife was Martha Rose, daughter of John Rose and granddaughter of Robert Rose. Their children were: Henry, born 1679; Eleanor, birth date unknown (c. 1683) and married in 1714. His second wife was Mercy Whitehead and their children were: twins Mary and Mercy, born 1691; Hannah, born 1693; John, born 1694; Eliphalet, born 1697; Elizabeth, born 1699; Dorothy, born 1702; and Doreas, born 1704.

The second son of Henry (born 1679) was William III, born at Branford, Connecticut, on September 6, 1702. He married Mary Knowles, of Branford, Connecticut, on November 5, 1730. They had eight children, Submit, Mary, Henry, Lydia, Samuel, Rebecca, Anne, and Stephen. Mary Knowles died on April 16, 1759, and William III married his second wife, Mary Wilkinson on April 17, 1760.

=== Henry Ludington II ===
Henry Ludington was the third child of William III and Mary (Knowles) Ludington. He was born at Branford, Connecticut, on May 25, 1739. He built his home and a grist mill around 1775 in the area known as the hamlet of Ludingtonville; this later became the town of Kent, Putnam County, New York. He was made Colonel during the American Revolution and was aide-de-camp to George Washington.

=== Sybil Ludington ===
Sybil Ludington was the first child of Henry Ludington II and his wife Abigail Ludington. Sybil has received widespread recognition as the female Paul Revere; a report in The New England Quarterly says there is little evidence backing the story, and whether the ride occurred is questioned by modern scholars. In 1777, at the age of 16, she is said to have ridden a horse 40 miles (64 km) through the night to warn militiamen under the direction of her father that British forces had raided Danbury, Connecticut.

=== Frederick Ludington sons ===
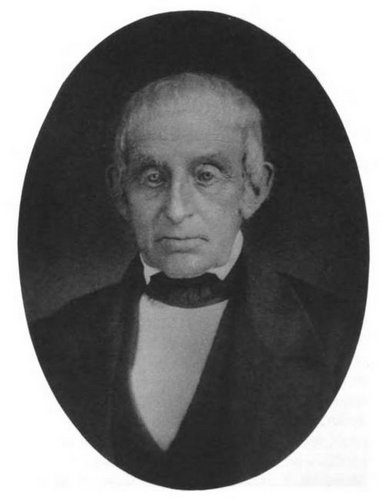
Frederick, 1852

Harrison Ludington and Nelson Ludington were sons of Frederick, and Colonel Ludington was their grandfather. Harrison is identified with the development of the city of Milwaukee. He served as a Governor of Wisconsin from 1876 to 1878.

Nelson established a sawmill and laid out the city of Escanaba, Michigan, in 1862 and provided the name for the city. Escanaba street names were originally named after the wives and daughters of the partners of the Nelson Ludington Company.

=== Lewis Ludington ===
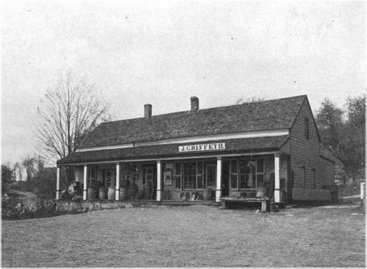
Frederick and Lewis built a store about 1808 in Kent, New York.

Lewis Ludington was the twelfth child and sixth son of Henry Ludington II. Lewis was the youngest of the children, born June 25, 1786. He helped develop Columbus, Wisconsin.

=== James Ludington ===
James Ludington, the sixth son of Lewis, never lived in Ludington, Michigan, a town named in his honor. Many of the street names of Ludington, Michigan, are related to James in one way or another. The main downtown intersection is James Street and Ludington Ave.

== Ludington family tree ==
Ludington family tree showing relationships and the complete American family line of the Ludingtons from the progenitor

William Ludington; 1608-1662	Ellen b 1617
founder of the Ludington family in America
(five other siblings)
(6th child)
Marcy Whithead (second wife)	William; 1655-1737	Martha Rose (first wife)
(two other siblings)
(1st child)
Henry b 1679	Sarah Collins; 1679-1743
(one older sibling)	William b 1702	Mary Knowles (first wife)	Elisha	wife
(seven other siblings)	(3rd child)	(other siblings?)
Henry b May 25, 1739 founder of Ludingtonville, NY	Abigail b May 8, 1745
twelve	children:
Sybil b April 5, 1761; Revolutionary War figure	Rebecca b January 24, 1763	Mary b July 31, 1765	Archibald b July 5, 1767	Henry b March 28, 1769	Derick b February 17, 1771
Tertullius b April 19, 1773	Abigail b February 26, 1776	Anne b March 14, 1778	Frederick b June 10, 1782	Sophia b May 16, 1784	Lewis b June 25, 1786	wife
14 other siblings
Harrison b 1812; Gov of Wisconsin	Nelson b 1818 founder of Escanaba, MI	Charlotte	James b 1827 founder of Ludington, MI	other siblings: Laura, Delia, William, Robert, Charles, Henry, Lavinia, Emily, and Amelia, whose names were used for streets of Ludington, MI
Mary	Jennie

== Sources ==
- Cutter, William Richard (1914). New England Families. Lewis Historical Publishing Company. p. 1102. OCLC 1048533505.
- Dickson, Karl (2002). Stories of Small Town Sports. K. Dickson. OCLC 632103235.
- Dunathan, Clint (1963). The Century Book. Photo Offset Printing Co. OCLC 9757108. "Ludington gave the name..."
- Heritage. Settlers of New York State. Heritage Books. ISBN 978-0-7884-3712-0. "Ludingtonville, borne by the hamlet which has grown up about his old home. Henry Ludington"
- Hunt, Paula D. (June 2015). "Sybil Ludington, the Female Paul Revere: The Making of a Revolutionary War Heroine". The New England Quarterly. 88 (2): 187–222. doi:10.1162/TNEQ_a_00452. ISSN 0028-4866. S2CID 57569643.
- Johnson, Willis (1907). Colonel Henry Ludington: A Memoir. Printed by his grandchildren Lavinia Elizabeth Ludington and Charles Henry Ludington : New York. OCLC 1081339067.
- Mason County Historical Society (1980). Historic Mason County, Michigan. Ludington, Michigan: Mason County Historical Society. OCLC 7429821.
- Miller, Jade S. (June 2012). Sybil's Ride of Courage. Tate Publishing & Enterprises, LLC. ISBN 978-1-61862-733-9. "Sybil rode almost three times as far as Paul Revere."
- Patrick, Lewis S. (1886). The Ludington Family. The Independent Press. OCLC 866627271.
- Stewart, Jon (2004). America (the Book). Warner Books. p. 23. ISBN 978-0-446-53268-6.
