= Coles Mills, New York =

Prior settlement in New York state

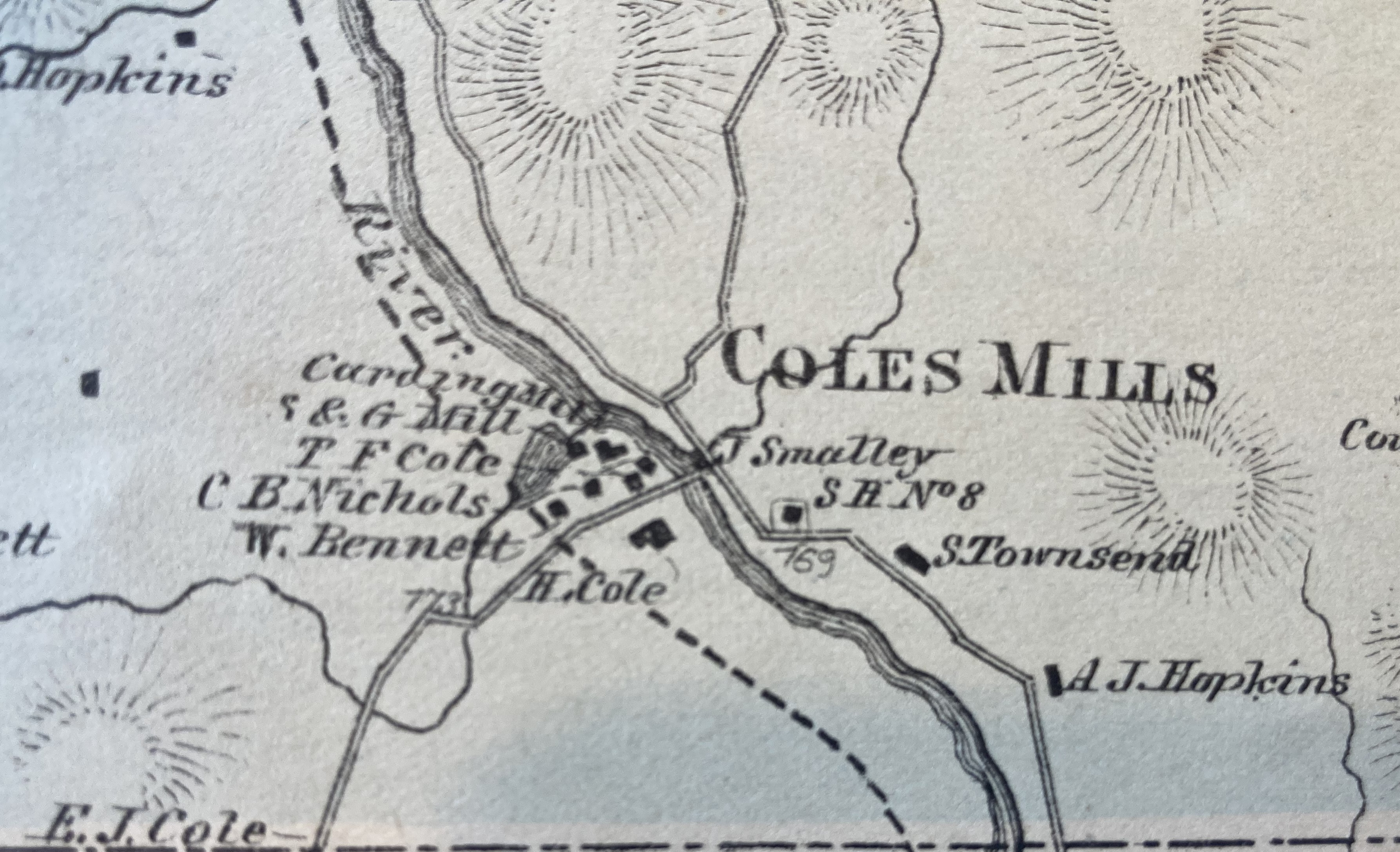
Cole's Mills from Beers Map of Kent, 1867

Coles Mills was a grist mill and small hamlet on the West Branch of the Croton River in Kent, New York. One of the first settlements in the Southern Precinct of Dutchess County, now Putnam County, in the state of New York, it features prominently on the 19th Century maps of the area including the 1854 R. F. O’Connor Map of Putnam County, the 1867 F.W. Beers Map, and the United States Geological Survey map from 1892. The mill and surrounding area was purchased by the New York City water supply system and submerged during the construction of West Branch Reservoir in the 1890s.

== History ==
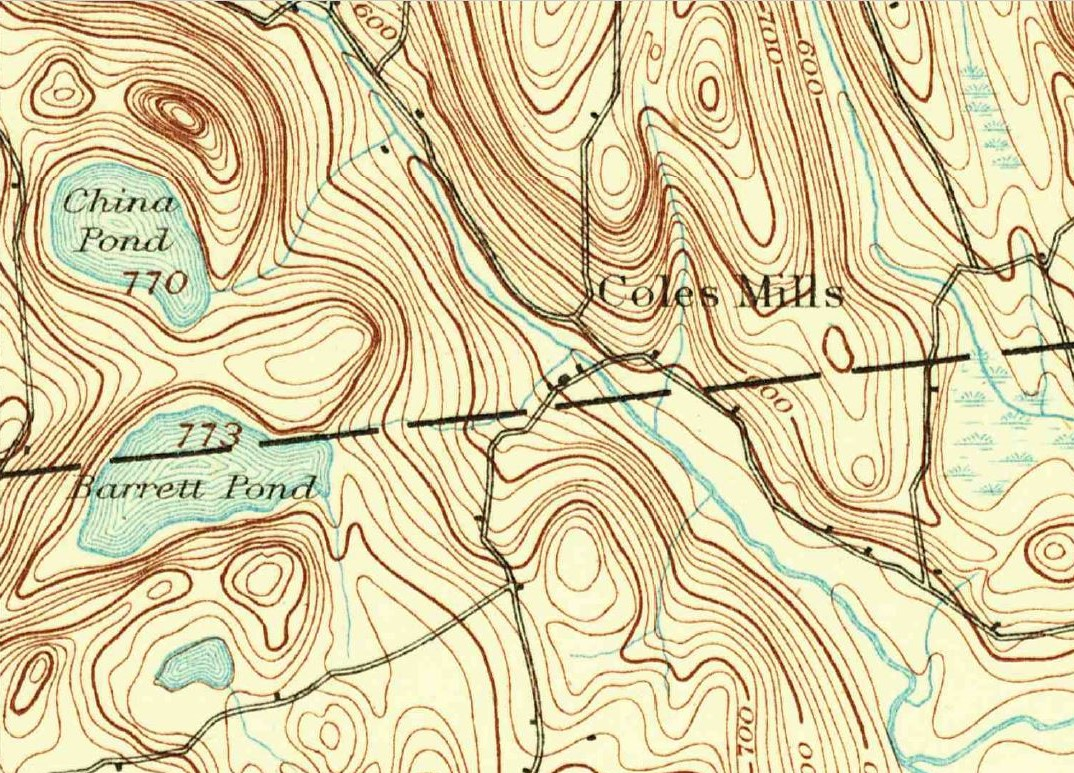
Cole's Mills USGS circa 1888

Cole's Mills was settled by Elisha Cole in 1747. Elisha and his wife Hannah Smalley moved from Harwich, Massachusetts, on Cape Cod. He built a grist mill at the outlet of Barrett Pond into the West Branch of the Croton River in 1748. A carding mill, saw mill, and school house were added in subsequent years. The land belonged to Frederick Philipse II, second Lord of the Philipsburg Manor; at some point it was leased. Mary Philipse inherited it in 1752, at age 22, as her share of the Philipse Patent (also known as the "Highland Patent"). In 1758 she married British army officer Roger Morris. After the Battles of Saratoga in 1777 during the American Revolutionary War the Commissioners of Forfeiture confiscated the land from the Morrises and sold it back to the tenants for £234 on June 11, 1782. Elisha and his sons were members of the 7th Regiment of the Dutchess County Militia, under Colonel Henry Ludington. Ludington's daughter, Sybil Ludington, reportedly rode through Coles Mills on April 26, 1777, as part of her all-night horseback ride to stir local militia to attach British forces near Danbury, Connecticut. Just east of Cole's Mills, on the road to Carmel, New York, was the farm of Captain Solomon Hopkins, where the patriot and spy Enoch Crosby took refuge from the British. Enoch Crosby was the hero of The Spy by James Fenimore Cooper.

Cole's Mills was downstream from the today's Boyds Corner Reservoir, the first reservoir constructed by the New York City Croton Aqueduct Commission in 1873. The construction of the reservoir was overseen by William M. Tweed, known as “Boss” Tweed, Commissioner of the New York City Department of Public Works, who ordered the construction of an earthen embankment to strengthen the structure. This embankment was poorly constructed, seen as unnecessary, and an opportunity for graft. Boss Tweed was convicted of 204 counts of corruption in 1873 and died in prison in 1878. In 1874, according to the Putnam County Courier, Theodore Frelinghuysen Cole of Cole's Mills sued New York City for $10,000 in damages due to the Boyds Corner Reservoir dam causing the stoppage of water from the Croton River to his four mills.

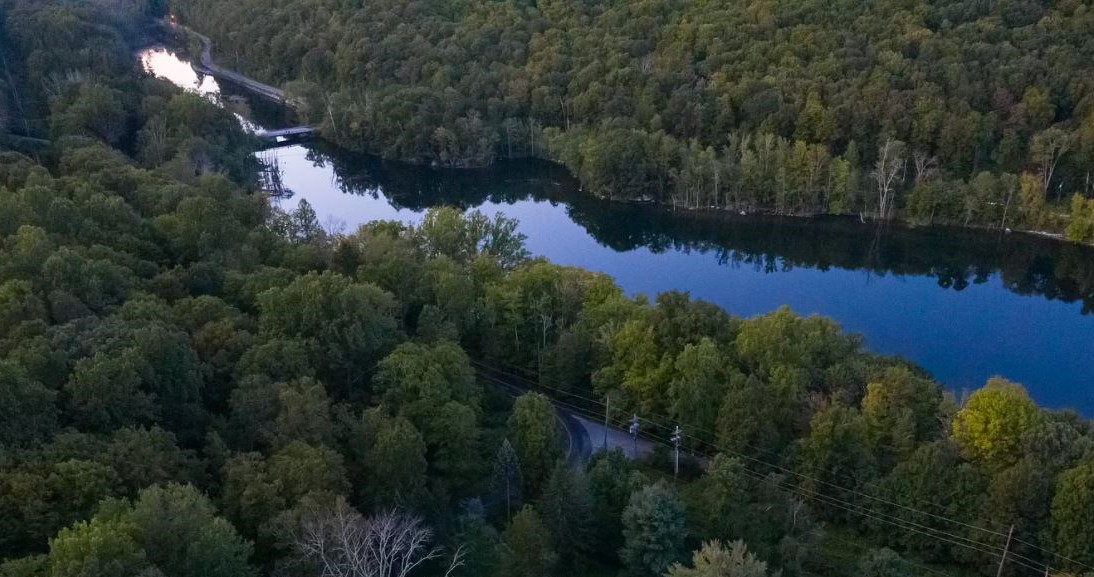
Cole's Mills site in 2020 at the Northwest point of the West Branch Reservoir

In 1888, NYC purchased the land and water rights of Cole's Mills from members of the Cole family. By 1890, work had begun on Reservoir D, now known as the West Branch Reservoir. Many residents felt the price they were offered was less than fair, and appealed to the three Commissioners of Appraisal: Hamilton Fish Jr., Henry Mabie, and John F. Dawson. Contractor M.S. Coleman was awarded the contract for building the West Branch dam and spillway for $398,262.50 in 1890. Theodore Frelinghuysen Cole (1844-1906) was the last Cole family miller at Cole's Mills and lived there until the reservoir was built.

Hundreds of men converged on the area to find work on the reservoirs. The work was difficult and laborers were killed and injured regularly, including 28-year old foreman “Con” Connolly in January 1891. As reported in The New York Times on October 21, 1893, a group of workers rebelled against Coleman's order that they board on the property, and attacked Henry Episcobo, the keeper of the boarding house.

Building the West Branch Reservoir required clearing Cole's Mills and the nearby basin of buildings and vegetation, relocating Dickson Road (now Dixon Road) over a new bridge at Cole's Mills, and building an 1,800-foot causeway, now part of New York State Route 301, which runs above the reservoir. The reservoir was put in service in late 1895 and construction completed in 1896. Cole's Mills was fully submerged when the dam was completed and the reservoir was filled.

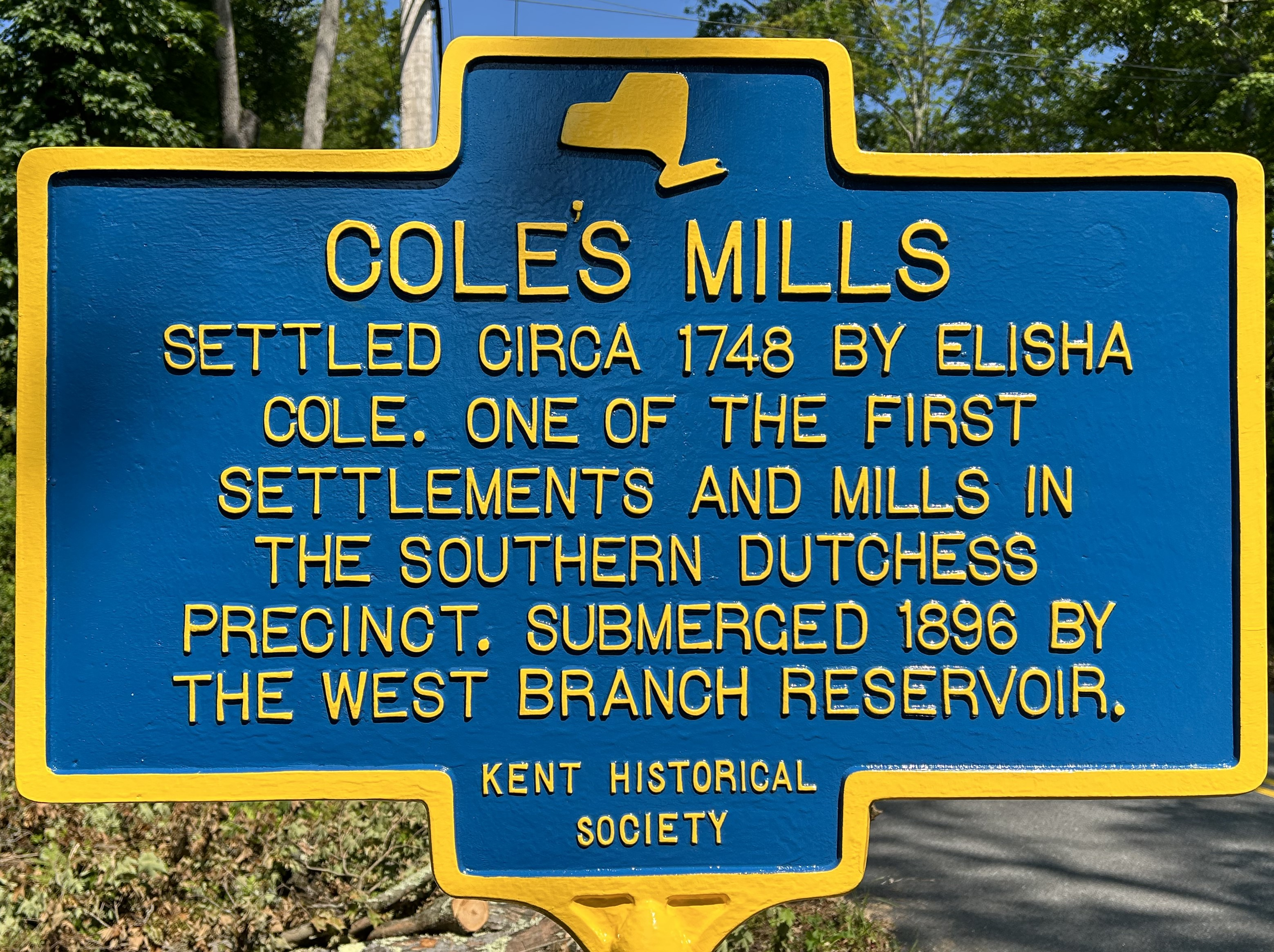
Historical Marker placed by the Kent Historical Society July 6, 2023

The building of Boyds Corner and West Branch Reservoirs reshaped the physical and cultural landscape of the town of Kent, as documented by archeologist Dr. April Beisaw, an anthropologist at Vassar College, in Taking Our Water For The City. Prior to the reservoirs, Kent had ninety-four farms, with 7,952 acres of cultivated land. A rural landscape of mills and dairy farms was transformed back into forest dotted by homes at a safe distance from the waterways. The NYC Department of Public Works targeted health “nuisances” throughout Kent beginning in 1893. Cole’s Mills was called an example of “the worst case of several here” with a house and mill in close contact with the water. Putnam County's center of commerce shifted from Kent to Brewster, and a planned railroad was rerouted from Boyd's Corner and Cole's Mills to Brewster. Brewster was also impacted, and the Borden New York Milk Condensery, the largest and most advanced of its time, was closed around 1914, as most of the area's viable farmland was eventually engulfed in the Croton Reservoir System.

Contractor Coleman also won the contract for the much larger New Croton Dam in 1892. In addition to capturing the flow from Boyds Corner Reservoir, the West Branch Reservoir is also a receiving reservoir for the Delaware Aqueduct, the world's longest tunnel constructed 1939-1945. The Delaware Aqueduct carries approximately half of New York City's water supply and turns south at a pumping station about a quarter mile from the now submerged village of Coles Mills.
