= Nelson Ludington =

American businessman and lumber baron

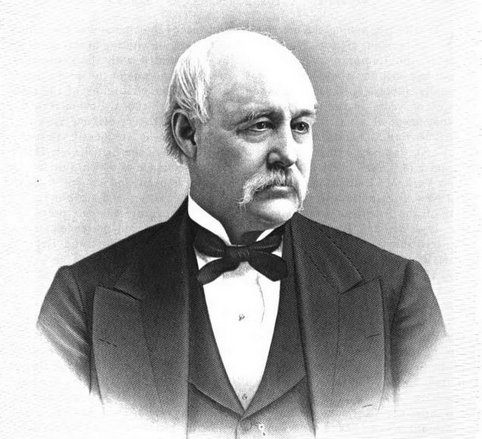
Nelson Ludington, c. 1880

Nelson Ludington (January 18, 1818 – January 15, 1883) was a nineteenth-century American businessman, lumber baron and banker. Born in Ludingtonville, New York, he made his fortune in the Midwest based on resource exploitation: lumber, iron ore and copper.

He bought large tracts of timber land on the Upper Peninsula of Michigan, where he was associated with the founding of the city of Escanaba. He also had a branch and the main lumber yards in Milwaukee, Wisconsin, but eventually based his namesake company in Chicago, Illinois, which became the boom town of the upper Midwest. There he helped found and served as president of the Fifth National Bank of Chicago.

== Early life and ancestry ==
Ludington was born on January 18, 1818, in Ludingtonville in Putnam County, New York, as the fourth of sixteen children. He was a direct descendant of William Ludington of the Ludington family. His grandfather was Henry Ludington.

Ludington took courses at the Tucker Hill Academy in a neighboring county.

== Career ==
Ludington's training for the business world started at a general store in Cold Spring, New York, a town located along the Hudson River. He later became a clerk in a dry goods store in New York City, receiving further training in the retail business. In 1839 he joined his older brother, Harrison Ludington, his uncle Lewis Ludington, and Harvey Burchard in the firm Ludington, Burchard and Company. After two years Nelson Ludington purchased Burchard's share of the business, and changed the name of the firm to Ludington and Company. Ludington sold his ownership share to the other partners in 1848.

Ludington started in the lumber industry with Daniel Wells Jr. and Jefferson Sinclair in 1848 in a new firm called N. Ludington & Co. He recognized that the rapid expansion of western towns around the Great Lakes would increase market demand for lumber, so he bought up large tracts of timber lands. Ludington constructed sawmills at Marinette and Escanaba, Michigan. For the first few years of N. Ludington & Company, the main docks and lumber yards of the firm were in Milwaukee and was the main distribution point to places throughout the United States via shipping on the Great Lakes.

Escanaba (originally called Flat Rock) was one of the places where Ludington established a sawmill. He named the settlement. Locals suggested it be named after the nearby river, known as the Escanawba by the local Ojibwa Indians, referring to the smooth, flat rocks on the river bottom. His hired surveyor, Eli Parsons Royce, entered the name on the town design schematic, as he understood it from a local Indian.

In 1863, Ludington became a director of the Fifth National Bank of Chicago, and later its president, before it became the National Bank of America. He accumulated a considerable fortune.

== Marriage and family ==
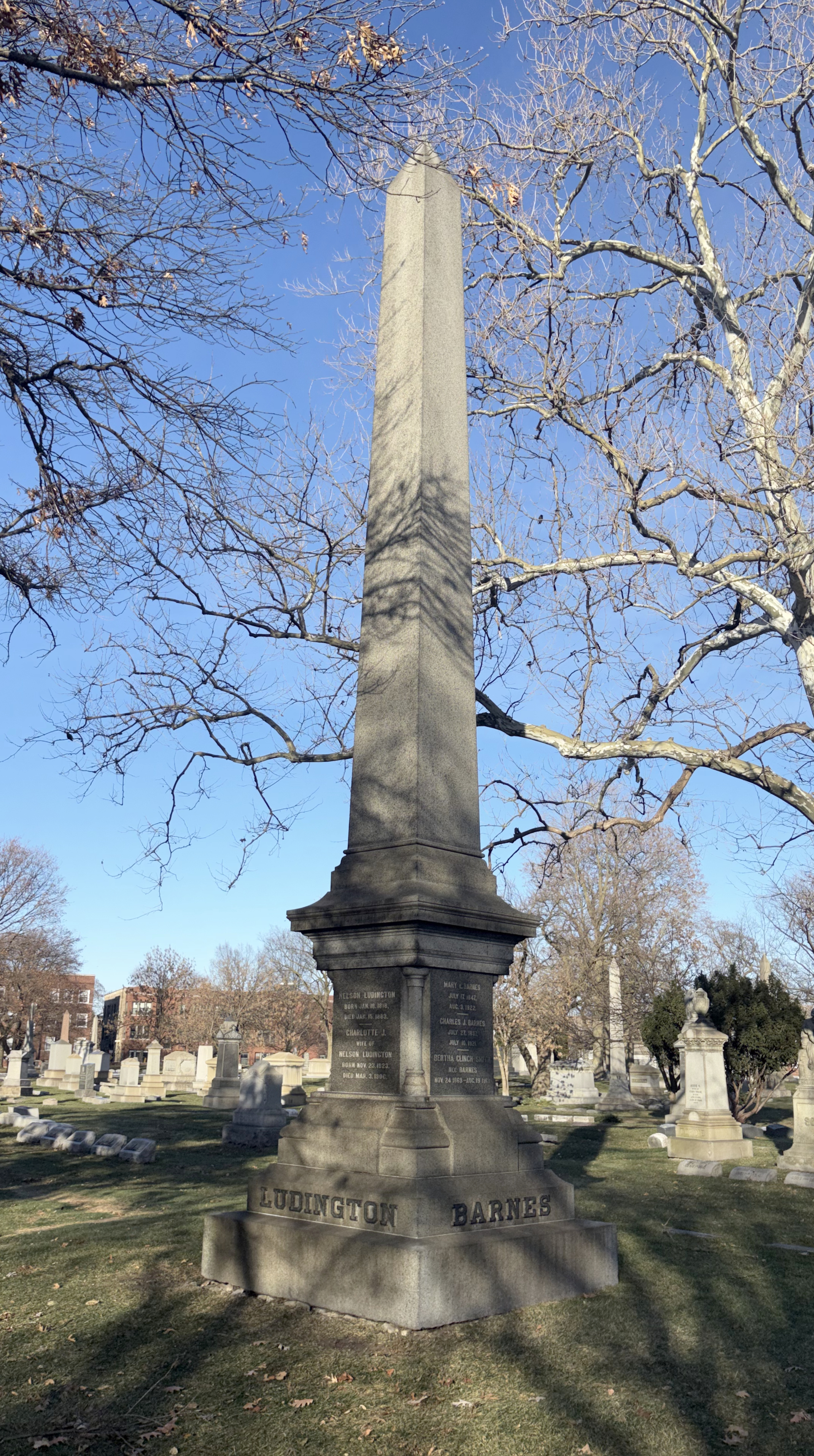
Ludington's grave at Graceland Cemetery

Ludington married Charlotte J. and they had two daughters. He died on January 15, 1883, in Chicago, and was buried at Graceland Cemetery.

== Legacy ==
His daughter Mary financed the Ludington Building in Chicago.

== Sources ==
- Conard, Howard Louis (1893). "Western Industrial Development: Nelson Ludington, Lumberman and Banker". National Magazine: A Monthly Journal of American History. Magazine of Western History Publishing Company. "For thirty-five years he was the executive head of the firm, and later of the corporation which bore his name, and during that time a vast industry, and one which yielded splendid fortunes to nearly all those interested in it, was built up."
- Hall, Henry, ed. (1896). America's Successful Men of Affairs: The United States at large. New York tribune.
- Hotchkiss, George Woodward (1894). Industrial Chicago: The Lumber Interest. Goodspeed Publishing Company.
- "Nelson Ludington". Dictionary of Wisconsin biography. The State Historical Society of Wisconsin. 1960.
- Nursey, Walter R. (1890). The city of Escanaba, Michigan, U. S. A., 'the iron port of the world'. A history of its growth, with a description of its industries, resources, commercial position, climate and topography. Lew A. Cates.
