= W. F. Johnson =

W. F. Johnson may refer to:

- Willis Fletcher Johnson (1857–1931), American writer for The New York Tribune
- William Frederick Johnson (1852–1934), Irish naturalist
