= Kent, New York =

- Town
- Town of Kent
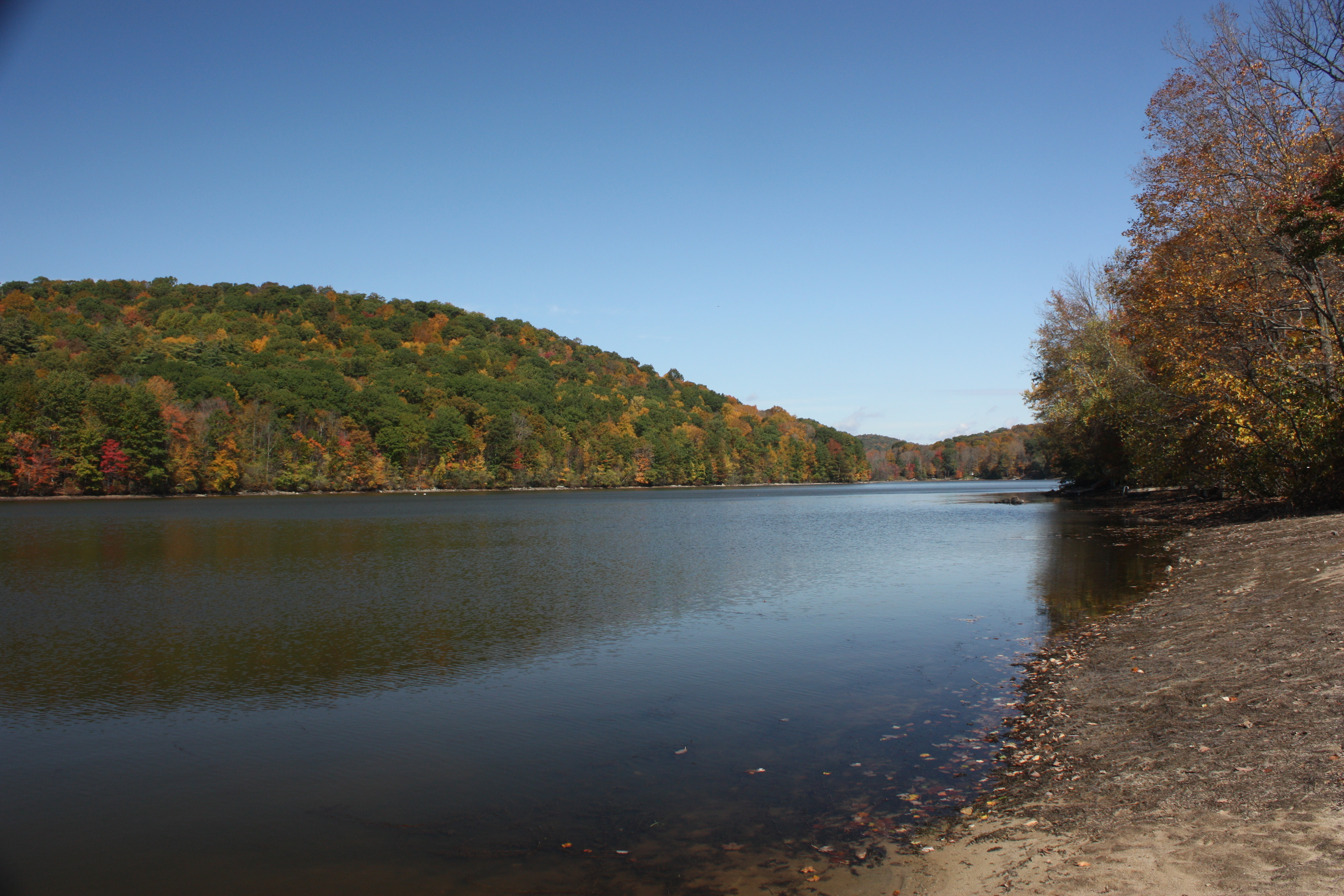
- Seven Hills Lake

- Seal

- Location of Town of Kent, New York
- Coordinates: 41°28′N 73°41′W
- Country: United States
- State: New York
- County: Putnam

Government
  - Supervisor: Jaime McGlasson

Area
  - Total: 43.32 sq mi (112.21 km^{2})
  - Land: 40.50 sq mi (104.90 km^{2})
  - Water: 2.82 sq mi (7.31 km^{2})
- Elevation: 610 ft (186 m)

Population (2020)
  - Total: 12,900
  - Estimate (July 2021): 12,922
  - Density: 327.9/sq mi (126.62/km^{2})
- Time zone: UTC-5 (Eastern (EST))
  - Summer (DST): UTC-4 (EDT)
- ZIP code: 10512
- Area code: 845
- FIPS code: 36-39331
- GNIS feature ID: 0979740
- Website: www.townofkentny.gov

Town of Kent is a town in Putnam County, New York, United States. The population was 12,900 at the 2020 census. The name is that of an early settler family. The town is in the north-central part of the Putnam County. Many of the lakes are reservoirs for New York City.

== History ==
Kent was part of the Highland Patent of 1697 today known as the Philipse Patent), when it was still populated by the Wappinger tribe. Daniel Nimham (1724–1778) was the last chief of the Wappingers and was the most prominent Native American of his time in the Hudson Valley.

Upon the 1751 death of Frederick Philipse II, second Lord of Philipsburg Manor and owner of the "Highland Patent", the Manor went to his son Frederick Philipse III and the Patent was divided among his four remaining offspring. Following the death of daughter Margaret in 1752, who died intestate, the Patent was then redivided among the three surviving heirs, son Philip, and daughters Susannah (wife of Beverley Robinson) and Mary (future wife of Col. Roger Morris). The tract was geographically split in 1754 into nine Lots: three on the river, three in the interior, and three on the eastern border abutting The Oblong. Each of the three heirs inherited a lot in each division; most of Kent fell into Mary's interior lot.

The town was first settled by Europeans in the mid-18th century by Zachariah Merritt and others, from New England, Westchester County, or the Fishkill area. Elisha Cole and his wife Hannah Smalley built Coles Mills in 1748, having moved to that location the previous year from Cape Cod. Around this same time the northeastern part of the county was settled by the Kent, Townsend, and Ludington families, among others. The father of Hannah Smalley and his family moved to Kent about two years before Elisha Cole and his family.

Kent was a part of the Frederickstown Precinct which was chartered in 1772, the rest of Frederickstown consisting of the future town of Carmel and the western parts of the future towns of Patterson and Southeast. Other early family names were Townsend, Smalley, Kent, Dykeman, Barrett, Cole, Boyd, Wixon, Farrington, Burton, and Carter.

The present-day intersection of Interstate 84 and Ludingtonville Road was the home of Col. Henry Ludington and his daughter Sybil, who was said to have ridden 40 miles (64 km) one night in 1777 to call up her father's militia during the American Revolutionary War. A statue of her stands on the shores of Lake Gleneida in the hamlet of Carmel across from the Putnam County Courthouse.

When the towns of Carmel and Patterson were split from Frederickstown in 1795, the remnant, constituting the current Kent, was established as the "Town of Frederick". As with its adjacent towns, it was part of Dutchess County until Putnam County was established in 1812. The town's name was changed to "Kent" in 1817. A small portion of the town of Philipstown geographically more accessible via Kent than it was transferred to Kent in 1877.

The major population center of the township is Lake Carmel, a settlement around an artificial lake of the same name developed in the 1920s and expanded dramatically in the last quarter of the 20th and first quarter of the 21st centuries. Historically the population centers had been Farmer's Mills and Luddingtonville, little of which remain, and Cole's Mills, hobbled when its mills' water supply became inadequate due to the early 1870s upstream construction of Boyds Corner Reservoir for the New York City water supply system, and shuttered in 1888 due to construction of West Branch reservoir (a tip of which lying in Kent submerged it completely by 1895).

Much of early Kent's economy was based on dairy farming for the New York City market, but with flooding associated with reservoir creation many farms were submerged, the dairy industry disturbed, and both farming and dairying were all but abandoned by the 1920s. At that point increased mobility thanks to the advent of the automobile started to attract new residents from the city, initially as weekend and summer visitors, then over time permanent dwellers.

The town is served by the Carmel Central School District and, for the majority of residents, by the Carmel Post Office(the portion served by that post office (ZIP code 10512) is allowed the optional postal designation Kent Lakes in addresses). Kent is home to the 82.5-foot-tall (25.1 m) Nimham Mountain Fire Tower, located in the Taconic Hills. Built by the State of New York and the CCC in 1940, it is the tallest remaining fire tower in New York state and appears on the National Historic Lookout Register. The Chuang Yen Monastery which is home to the largest indoor statue of Buddha in the Western Hemisphere, is also located in Kent.

== Geography ==
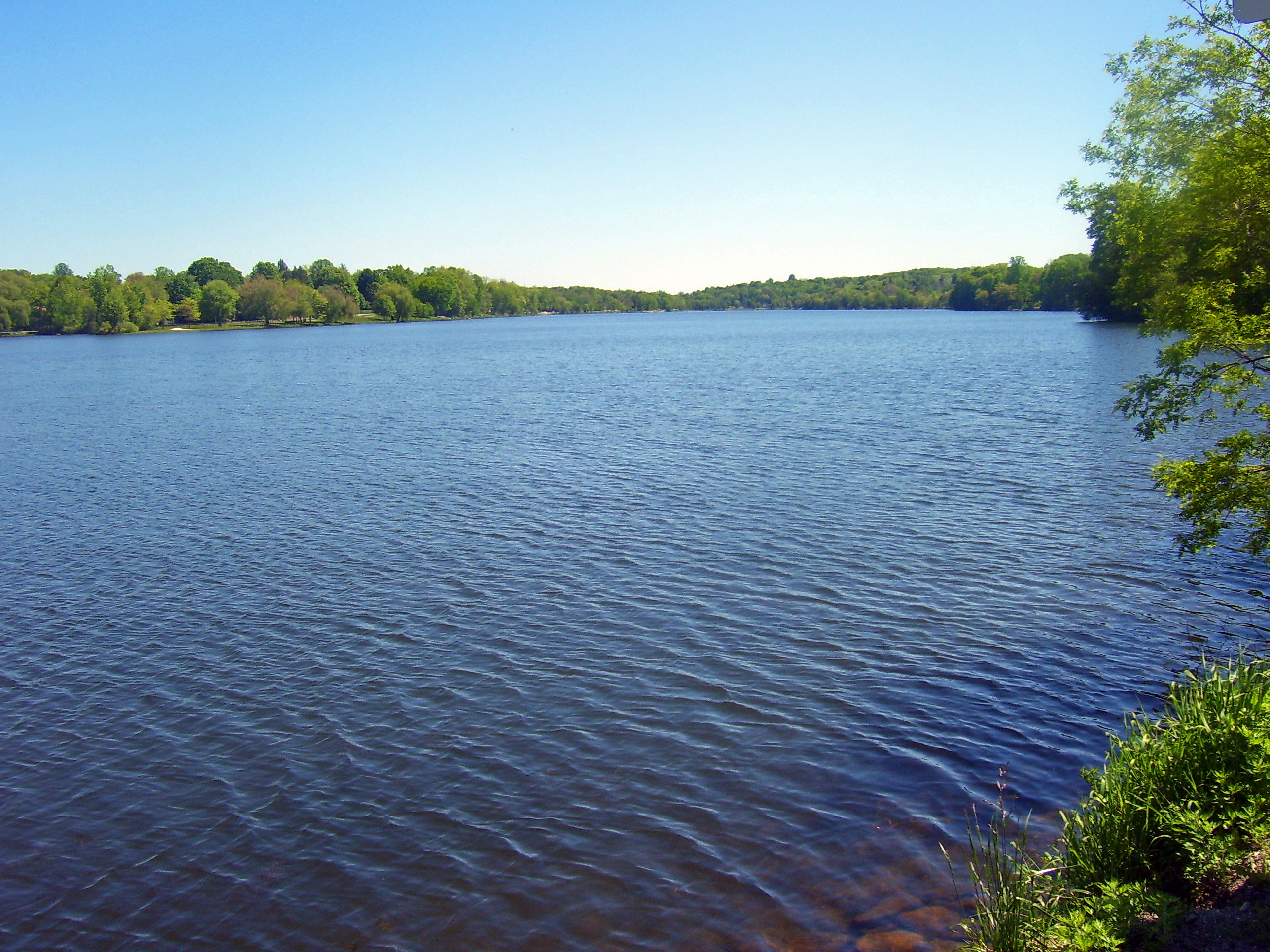
In spite of its name, Lake Carmel lies in Kent

Kent is rugged and hilly, sitting atop the interior ridges of the Hudson Highlands some 60 miles (97 km) north of New York City in the north central portion of Putnam County. It borders the towns of Philipstown and Putnam Valley to the west and southwest; Patterson to the east, and Carmel to the south. The northern town line is the border of the Dutchess County towns of East Fishkill and Pawling.

Two state parks, Wonder Lake in the east and Fahnestock in the west, a portion of the Appalachian National Scenic Trail, and thousands of acres of open space under the permanent protection of the New York City Department of Environmental Protection as part of the New York City water supply system's Croton Watershed, offer recreational opportunities.

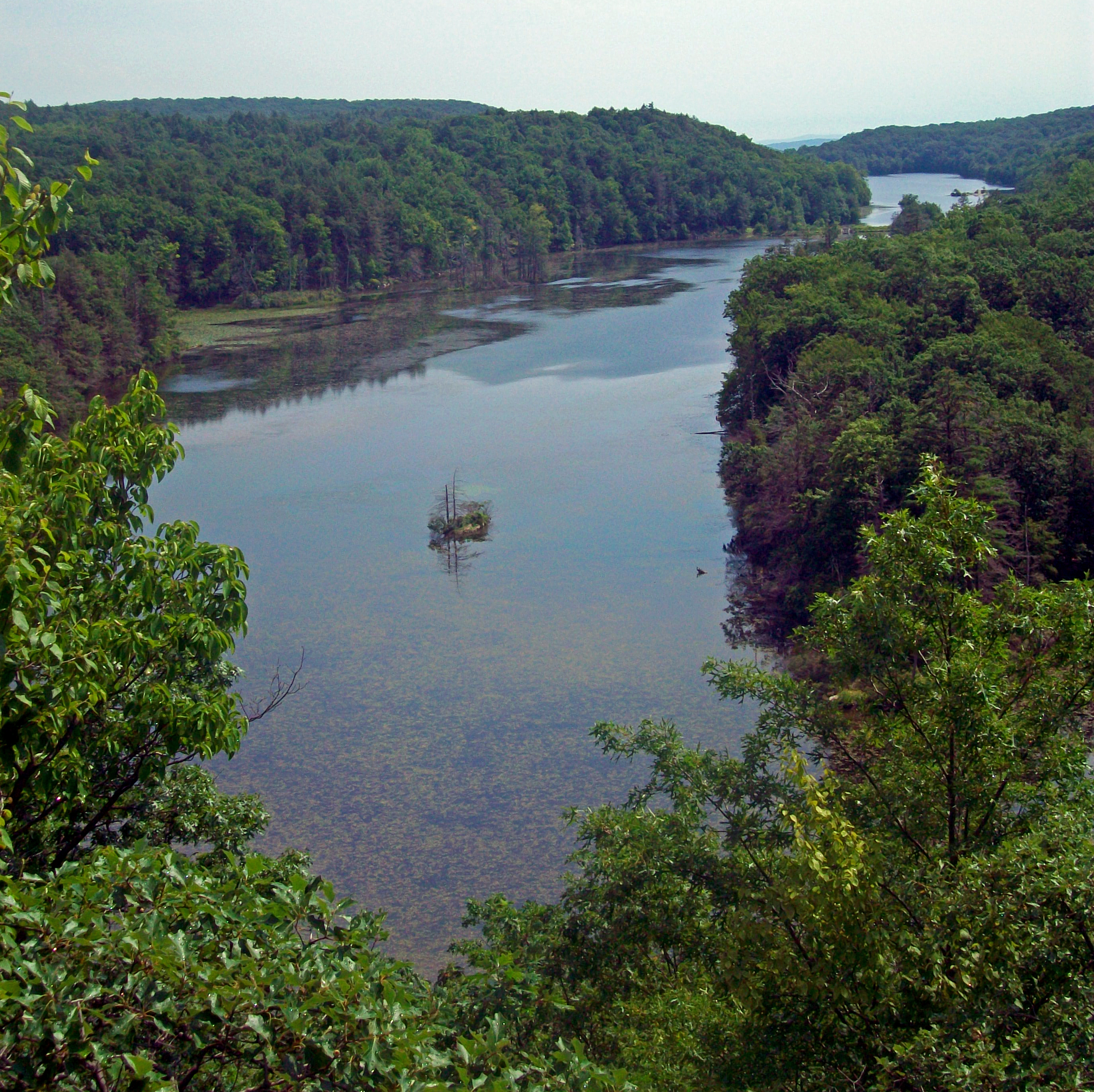
Canopus Lake in Clarence Fahnestock Memorial State Park

The town is home to a number of lakes, which were once popular with summer residents but now have become year-round communities, including Sagamore Lake, Kentwood Lake, Lake Tibet, China Lake, Palmer Lake, and White Pond. Kent is also home to two reservoirs that are part of the New York City drinking water supply, with much adjacent land purchased by it for conservation through the Watershed Preservation Program. These include Boyds Corner and West Branch, with the latter being the east-of-Hudson terminus of the important Catskill Mountain-fed Delaware Aqueduct.

East-West Interstate 84 in the east, and the North-South Taconic State Parkway in the west, pass through the town in opposite northern corners.

== Demographics ==
Historical population
Census	Pop.	Note	%±
1820	1,801		—
1830	1,928		7.1%
1840	1,830		−5.1%
1850	1,557		−14.9%
1860	1,479		−5.0%
1870	1,547		4.6%
1880	1,361		−12.0%
1890	1,147		−15.7%
1900	1,026		−10.5%
1910	968		−5.7%
1920	696		−28.1%
1930	770		10.6%
1940	1,546		100.8%
1950	2,146		38.8%
1960	3,924		82.9%
1970	8,106		106.6%
1980	12,433		53.4%
1990	13,183		6.0%
2000	14,009		6.3%
2010	13,507		−3.6%
2016 (est.)	13,283		−1.7%
U.S. Decennial Census

As of the census of 2000, there were 14,009 people, 4,868 households, and 3,748 families residing in the town. The population density was 344.8 inhabitants per square mile (133.1/km^{2}). There were 5,353 housing units at an average density of 131.8 units per square mile (50.9 units/km^{2}). The racial makeup of the town was 93.81% white, 1.41% African American, .14% Native American, 1.24% Asian, .01% Pacific Islander, 1.81% from other races, and 1.57% from two or more races. Hispanic or Latino of any race were 5.77% of the population.

There were 4,868 households, out of which 38.3% had children under the age of 18 living with them, 64.4% were married couples living together, 9.0% had a female householder with no husband present, and 23.0% were non-families. 17.5% of all households were made up of individuals, and 4.8% had someone living alone who was 65 years of age or older. The average household size was 2.84 and the average family size was 3.24.

In the town, the population was spread out, with 26.3% under the age of 18, 6.2% from 18 to 24, 32.1% from 25 to 44, 25.7% from 45 to 64, and 9.7% who were 65 years of age or older. The median age was 38 years. For every 100 females, there were 98.4 males. For every 100 females age 18 and over, there were 96.2 males.

The median income for a household in the town was $72,346, and the median income for a family was $79,716. Males had a median income of $51,634 versus $38,575 for females. The per capita income for the town was $29,984. About 4.2% of families and 4.1% of the population were below the poverty line, including 4.6% of those under age 18 and 8.4% of those age 65 or over.

== Government ==
The town of Kent is governed by a town board which meets at a town hall on Route 52 part of a complex with a new police headquarters and public library that opened in 2008 . Laws are primarily enforced by officers of the town's police department.

== Communities and locations in Kent ==
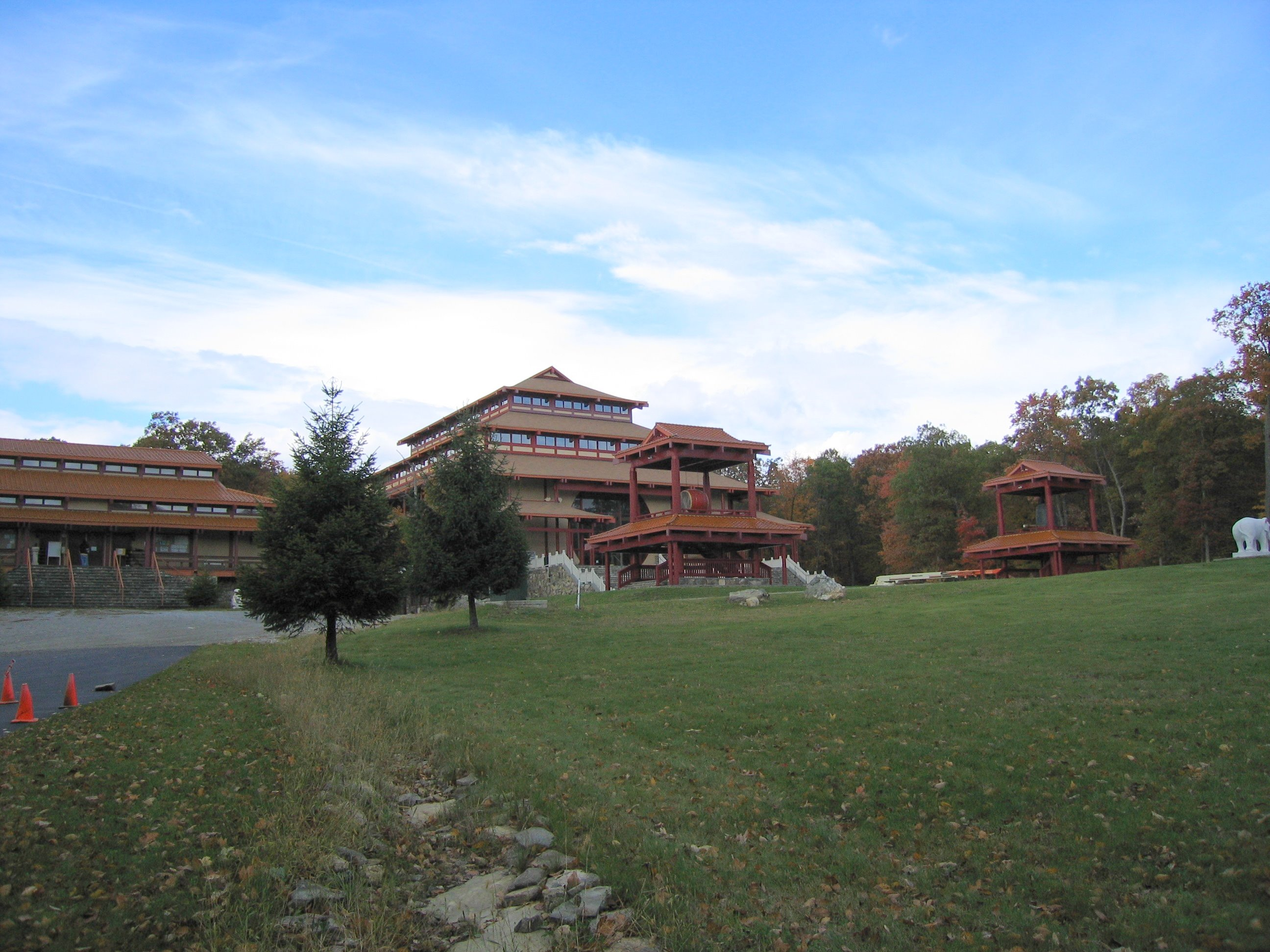
The Chuang Yen Monastery (莊嚴寺) houses the largest indoor statue of Buddha in the Western Hemisphere

- Allen Corners – hamlet in the northwestern part of the town
- Berkshire Terrace – hamlet in the northern section of the town
- Camp Hines – locale
- Carmel Park Estates – locale
- Clear Pool Camp – locale
- Coles Mills – a hamlet, now submerged in the West Branch Reservoir, in the southern part of the town
- Clarence Fahnestock State Park – state park in the western part of the town
- Farmers Mills – a hamlet in the northwestern part of the town
- Gipsy Trail Club – a locale
- Hill & Dale Country Club – Palmer Lake Community
- Lake Carmel – hamlet in the eastern part of the town
- Kent Cliffs – a locale
- Kent Corners – a hamlet north of Lake Carmel village
- Kent Hills – a hamlet south of Ludingtonville
- Kentwood Estates – hamlet in the northern part of town
- Ludingtonville – hamlet near the northern town line
- Meads Corners – a locale
- Nimham Mountain Fire Tower – tallest historic fire tower in New York state
- Richardsville – a locale
- Seven Hills Lake – a locale
- Wonder Lake State Park – state park in the eastern section of the town
- Yale Corners – a locale

== Notable people ==
- Mark Adamo, composer and librettist
- John Corigliano, composer
- Lewis Ludington, businessman, lumber baron, and real estate developer was born here.
- George Whipple III, lawyer and society reporter for NY1, grew up here and ran for town supervisor in 1969, when he was 14.
