= Chuang Yen Monastery =

Buddhist temple in New York, United States

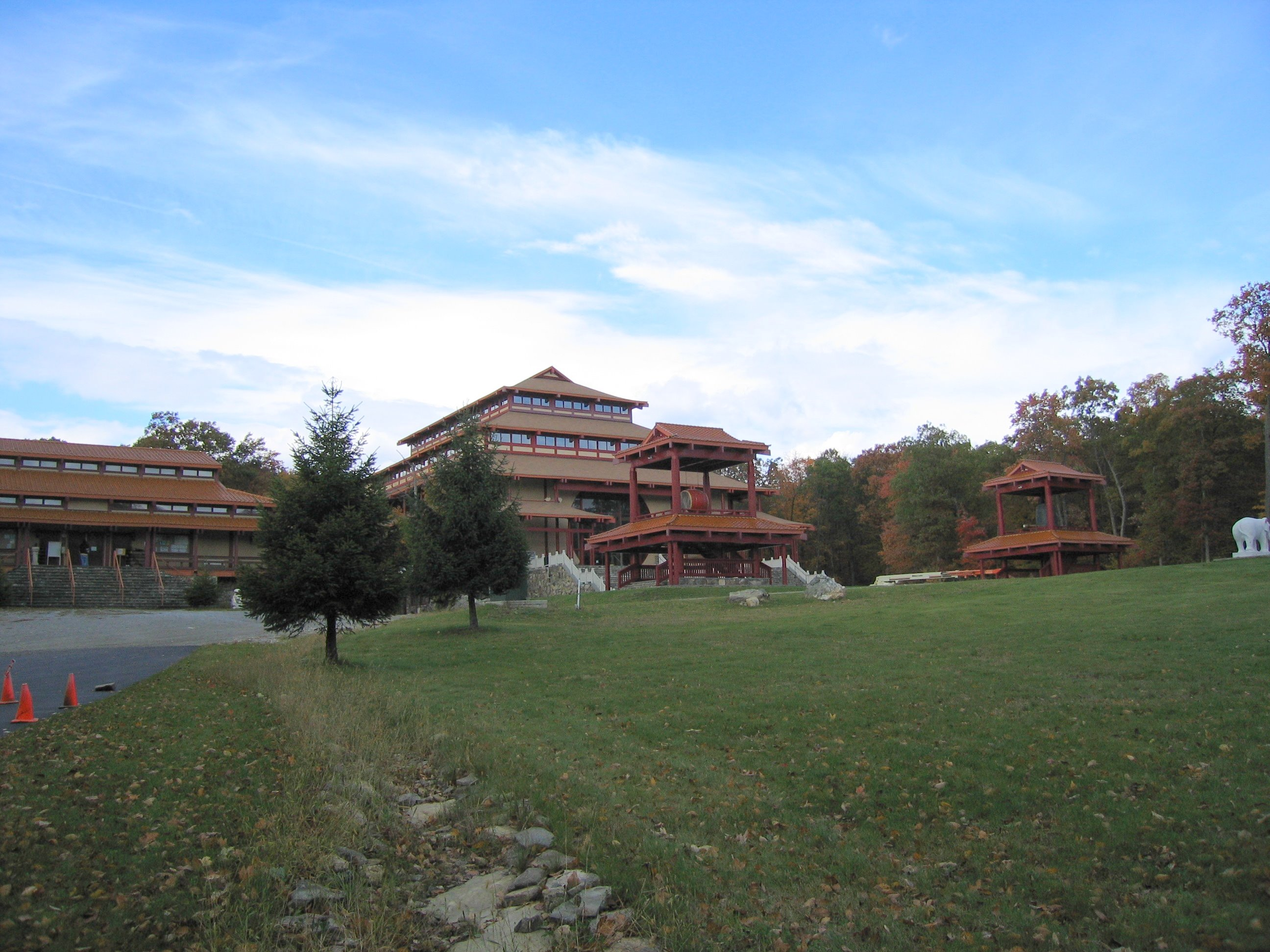
- The tallest structure in the Chuang Yen Monastery, the Great Buddha Hall, houses the largest indoor statue of a Buddha in the Western Hemisphere.

Religion
- Affiliation: Buddhism
- Status: Active

Location
- Location: Kent, New York
- Country: United States
- Interactive map of Chuang Yen Monastery
- Coordinates: 41°29′7.46″N 73°47′38.64″W

Architecture
- Architect: Edward A Valeri
- Style: Tang dynasty
- Founder: Buddhist Association of the United States
- Established: November 1975
- Site area: 225 acres (91 hectares)

Website
- www.baus.org

Chuang Yen Monastery (Chinese: 莊嚴寺; pinyin: Zhuāngyán sì) is a Buddhist temple situated on 225 acres (91 hectares) in Kent, Putnam County, New York, in the United States. The temple is home to the largest indoor statue of a Buddha (Vairocana) in the Western Hemisphere. The name "Chuang Yen" means "Majestically Adorned".

== History ==
In November 1975, the Buddhist Association of the United States (BAUS) leased 125 acres of land in Putnam County from Dr. C.T. Shen (one of the co-founders of BAUS and late vice president of BAUS) for the development of Chuang Yen Monastery. According to the temple, the lease was for ninety-nine years with an annual payment of one dollar. As suggested by the local government, Dr. Shen donated the land to BAUS in 1989.

Much of the temple buildings are built in the architectural style of China's Tang dynasty, and was designed by architect Edward A Valeri RA. On May 23, 1981, a groundbreaking ceremony was held for the first building, the Kuan Yin Hall. The other buildings that make up the monastery were added over the years: the Dining Hall, the Thousand Lotus Memorial Terrace, the Tai Hsu Hall, the Yin Kuang Hall, the Woo Ju Memorial Library and the Great Buddha Hall. The Great Buddha Hall's opening was presided over by the 14th Dalai Lama.

== Leadership ==
The first president of BAUS, Venerable Lok To, laid the foundation of BAUS. Venerables Ming Chi and Xian Ming, together with Dr. Shen, took on the challenge and assumed the responsibility of building and serving Chuang Yen Monastery.

- Jen Chun (President of BAUS 1980 – 1986 & 2002 – 2007)
- Sheng-yen (Abbot of Great Enlightenment Temple 1977 – 1978)
- Shou Yu (Abbot of CYM 1999 – 2001)
- Ming Kuang (Abbot of CYM 2001 – 2002, President of BAUS 1999 – 2002)
- Ji Ru (Abbot of CYM 2002 – 2004)
- Jing Tong (Abbot of CYM 2004 – 2007)
- Ji Xing (President of BAUS 2007 – 2013)
- Bhikkhu Bodhi (President of BAUS 2013 – Present)
- Dhammadipa (Fa Yao; Abbot of CYM 2008 – 2015)
- Hui Tsong (Abbot of CYM 2016 – 2018)
- Yung Hsin & Hong Zhen (Co-Abbesses of CYM 2019 – Present)

== Services ==
Prayer and meditation retreat programs have been offered by the monastery regularly since at least 2006. The monastery provides meals and beds to pilgrims who attend the programs, though there are strict guidelines and schedule during the period.
