= David G. Hooker =

Mayor of Milwaukee (1830–1888)

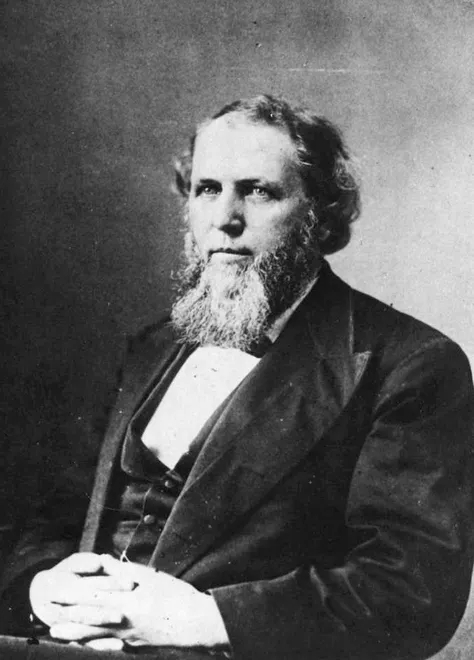
- Hooker c. 1872–1873

21st Mayor of Milwaukee, Wisconsin
- In office April 1872 – April 1873
- Preceded by: Harrison Ludington
- Succeeded by: Harrison Ludington

Personal details
- Born: September 4, 1830 Poultney, Vermont, U.S.
- Died: March 6, 1888 (age 57) Jacksonville, Florida, U.S.
- Party: Democratic
- Spouses: Sarah P. Harris; Julia Ashley (m. 1872)
- Children: 6
- Education: Middlebury College
- Profession: Lawyer, politician

David Griswold Hooker (September 5, 1830 – March 6, 1888) was an American lawyer, businessman, Democratic politician, and Wisconsin pioneer. He was the 21st mayor of Milwaukee, Wisconsin (1872–1873), and also served several years as city attorney. In his later years, he was a member of the executive committee of the Northwestern Mutual Life Insurance Company.

== Biography ==
Hooker was born in Poultney, Vermont; reports have differed on the date. He graduated from Middlebury College in 1853, and moved to Milwaukee in 1856. Later, he married Sarah P. Harris. They had three children before she died. In 1872, he married Julia Ashley. They also had three children. He would later become General Counsel of Northwestern Mutual Life Insurance Company. Hooker died of heart disease on March 6, 1888, in Jacksonville, Florida. He was buried at Forest Home Cemetery.

== Political career ==
Hooker was City Attorney of Milwaukee from 1867 to 1870. He was elected mayor in 1872 and served one term. Hooker was a Democrat.
