= Ludingtonville, New York =

- Hamlet
- Location within New York
- Coordinates: 41°30′32″N 73°41′28″W
- Country: United States
- State: New York
- County: Putnam
- Elevation: 906 ft (276 m)
- Time zone: UTC-5 (Eastern (EST))
  - Summer (DST): UTC-4 (EDT)
- Area code: 845
- GNIS feature ID: 956138

Ludingtonville is a hamlet in the town of Kent, Putnam County, New York, United States. It is named for early settler Henry Ludington from Connecticut.

The building of Interstate 84 in New York resulted in the demolition of much of the historic center to build Exit 17 at Ludingtonville Road, which Ludington Mill survived until a fire burnt it down in 1972—mere months before Putnam's historical society was to restore it. Today Kent Historic Society has made restoring Ludington's mill its project.

== Notable people ==
- Nelson Ludington, American lumber baron in Michigan, businessman and banker in Chicago, was born and raised in Chicago.
- Sybil Ludington, the American Revolutionary heroine, was born and raised here. Ludington Mill was owned by her family.

== See also ==
- Town of Kent New York: An Illustrated History by George Carroll Whipple III and Reginald White (second edition 2012).
