= James Ludington =

American businessman

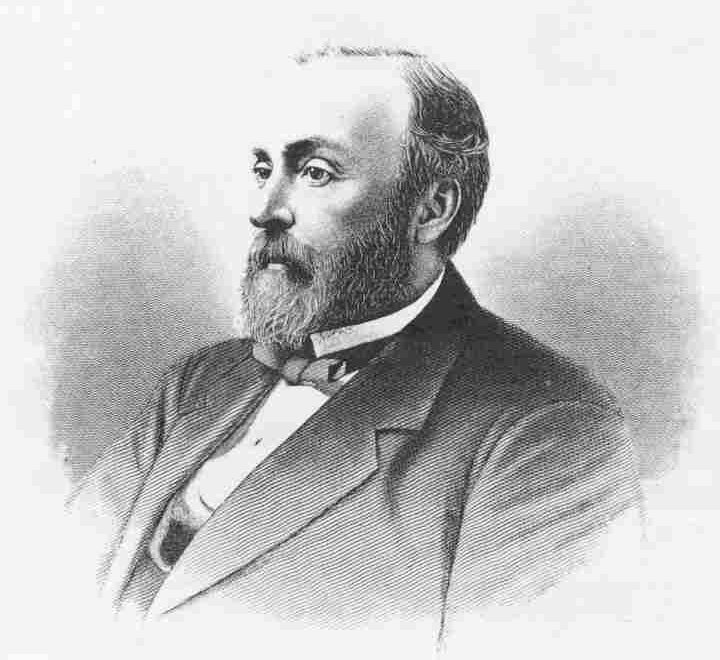
- Born: April 18, 1827; Carmel, Putnam County, New York
- Died: April 1, 1891 (aged 63)
- Resting place: Milwaukee, Wisconsin
- Occupations: Businessman, entrepreneur
- Employer: Self-employed
- Known for: Developing Ludington, Michigan
- Political party: Republican
- Spouse: Never married
- Parent(s): Lewis Ludington, father
- Relatives: see Ludington family

James Ludington (April 18, 1827 – April 1, 1891) was an American businessman. He obtained a sawmill in the village of Pere Marquette. Ludington platted the land there and formed a town with a lumber company operation. He sold his interest to the lumber company for a large sum of money and became wealthy. The town later changed its name and became Ludington, Michigan, although he never lived there.

== Early life ==
James was born in Carmel, New York on April 18, 1827. In 1843, the Ludington family moved from New York to Milwaukee, Wisconsin, when James was 16. James and his father, Lewis Ludington, founded Columbus, Wisconsin.

== Land developer ==
In 1854, Ludington was involved in a scandal after he filed for the purchase of unsold school land from the state of Wisconsin that was believed to contain some 70,000 acres (28,000 hectares). The sale was challenged when the parcel was identified as containing more land than thought.

Ludington platted 360 acres of the land around Pere Marquette in 1867 and sold lots to individuals, developing the town. In the same year, he built a large commercial building, called "The Big Store" that sold a variety of goods. Also at that time Ludington founded the first newspaper in the village, the Mason County Record. The sawmill that Ludington acquired developed into an independent entity, called the Pere Marquette Lumber Company, which operated and managed the sawmill and The Big Store. On July 24, 1869, Ludington sold his interests to the company for half a million dollars, making him wealthy. Ludington used a portion of this money to develop the village. On March 22, 1873, the city of Ludington was chartered.

Ludington lived in New York state as a boy and in Wisconsin as an adult, but never lived in Ludington, Michigan, the town named after him. Ludington Avenue and James Street are named after him. The streets Lewis, William, Robert, Charles, Harrison, Emily, Lavinia, and Delia are named after his family members. Ludington died on April 1, 1891, in his residence at Plankinton House Hotel in Milwaukee, Wisconsin, and was to be buried at Carmel.

== Positions ==
Ludington was the treasurer of La Crosse Railroad. In Madison, Wisconsin, he served as an alderman and as president of Bank of the West. In Milwaukee, he was vice-president of the Juneau Bank.
