= 1875 Wisconsin gubernatorial election =

- November 2, 1875
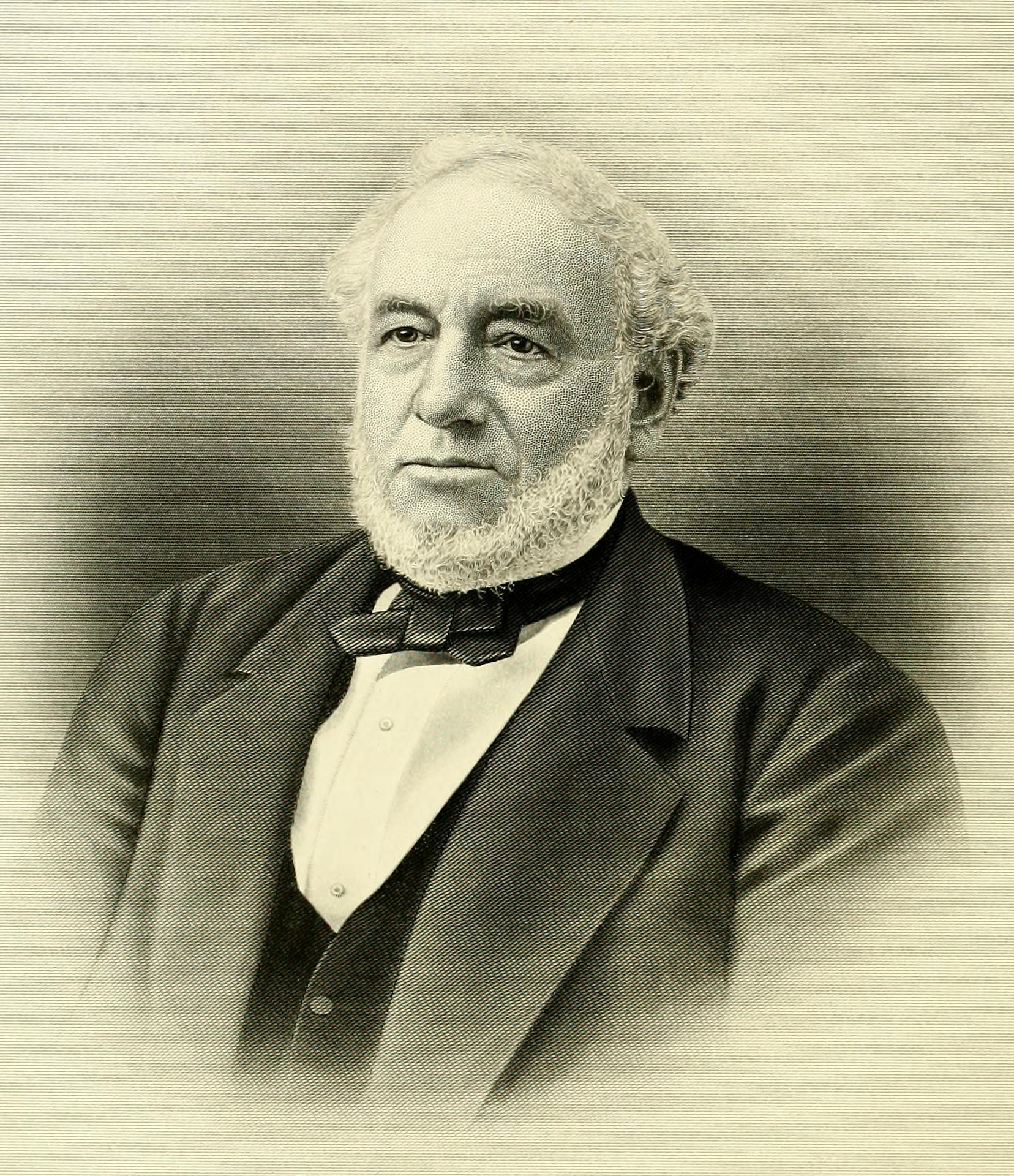

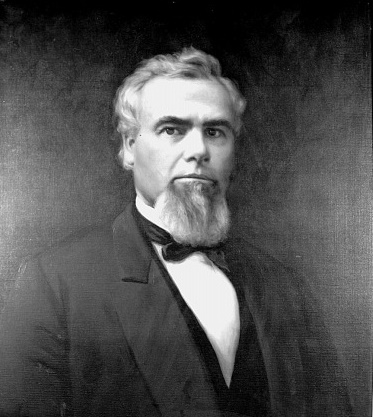
Nominee	Harrison Ludington	William Robert Taylor
Party	Republican	Democratic
Alliance	—	Reform
Popular vote	85,155	84,314
Percentage	50.07%	49.58%
- County results Ludington : 50–60% 60–70% 70–80% 80–90% >90% Taylor : 50–60% 60–70% 70–80% 80–90%
Governor before election
William Robert Taylor
Democratic
Elected Governor
Harrison Ludington
Republican

The 1875 Wisconsin gubernatorial election was held on November 2, 1875. Republican Party candidate Harrison Ludington was elected with 50% of the vote, narrowly defeating incumbent Democratic governor William Robert Taylor.

Taylor was once again nominated as the consensus candidate of the "Reform Party,"—a coalition of Democrats, Liberal Republicans, and Grangers. He was opposed by Ludington, who disagreed with the regulations placed on railroads and in turn received the support of railroad companies. The reelection defeat of Taylor prompted the dissolution of the Reform coalition, with the Grangers standing their own candidate under the Greenback Party in the following election.

== Nominations ==
=== Democratic (Reform) party ===
William Robert Taylor was the incumbent governor of Wisconsin, having been elected in the 1873 election. Previously, he had served as trustee for the State Hospital of the Insane, the president of the state agriculture society, had been chairman of the Cottage Grove town board, and the Dane County board of supervisors, and had been a member of the Wisconsin State Senate and Assembly.

=== Republican party ===
Harrison Ludington, at the time of the 1875 election, served as Mayor of Milwaukee. Previously he had been elected as a Milwaukee alderman for two terms, having been a businessman working in merchandising, lumber and construction until then.

== Results ==
1875 Wisconsin gubernatorial election
Party	Candidate	Votes	%	±%
Republican	Harrison Ludington	85,155	50.07%	+5.28%
Democratic	William R. Taylor (incumbent)	84,314	49.58%	−5.61%
Prohibition	C. F. Hammond	460	0.27%	
	Scattering	141	0.08%	
Majority		841	0.49%	
Total votes		170,070	100.00%	
Republican gain from Democratic		Swing	+10.89%	

=== Results by county ===
Oconto County voted for the losing candidate for the first time since 1859; this would not occur again until 1958. Kenosha County also voted for the losing candidate for the first time since 1853 and would not do so again until 1910.

County	Harrison Ludington Republican		William R. Taylor Democratic		C. F. Hammond Prohibition		Scattering Write-in		Margin		Total votes cast
County	#	%	#	%	#	%	#	%	#	%	Total votes cast
Adams	705	66.01%	362	33.90%	0	0.00%	1	0.09%	343	32.12%	1,068
Ashland	77	44.00%	98	56.00%	0	0.00%	0	0.00%	-21	-12.00%	175
Barron	501	70.86%	206	29.14%	0	0.00%	0	0.00%	295	41.73%	707
Bayfield	75	68.18%	35	31.82%	0	0.00%	0	0.00%	40	36.36%	110
Brown	1,716	41.83%	2,385	58.14%	0	0.00%	1	0.02%	-669	-16.31%	4,102
Buffalo	696	45.25%	841	54.68%	0	0.00%	1	0.07%	-145	-9.43%	1,538
Burnett	312	96.89%	10	3.11%	0	0.00%	0	0.00%	302	93.79%	322
Calumet	449	28.29%	1,137	71.64%	0	0.00%	1	0.06%	-688	-43.35%	1,587
Chippewa	714	40.94%	1,030	59.06%	0	0.00%	0	0.00%	-316	-18.12%	1,744
Clark	717	57.73%	525	42.27%	0	0.00%	0	0.00%	192	15.46%	1,242
Columbia	2,413	59.36%	1,618	39.80%	31	0.76%	3	0.07%	795	19.56%	4,065
Crawford	847	43.37%	1,106	56.63%	0	0.00%	0	0.00%	-259	-13.26%	1,953
Dane	4,457	47.94%	4,823	51.88%	0	0.00%	17	0.18%	-366	-3.94%	9,297
Dodge	2,503	34.78%	4,685	65.10%	9	0.13%	0	0.00%	-2,182	-30.32%	7,197
Door	453	55.31%	366	44.69%	0	0.00%	0	0.00%	87	10.62%	819
Douglas	34	30.63%	77	69.37%	0	0.00%	0	0.00%	-43	-38.74%	111
Dunn	1,159	57.18%	867	42.77%	0	0.00%	1	0.05%	292	14.41%	2,027
Eau Claire	1,641	60.40%	1,076	39.60%	0	0.00%	0	0.00%	-565	-20.79%	2,717
Fond du Lac	3,392	44.75%	3,973	52.41%	214	2.82%	1	0.01%	-581	-7.66%	7,580
Grant	3,182	57.85%	2,318	42.15%	0	0.00%	0	0.00%	864	15.71%	5,500
Green	1,960	54.92%	1,595	44.69%	0	0.00%	14	0.39%	365	10.23%	3,569
Green Lake	1,127	57.24%	795	40.38%	47	2.39%	0	0.00%	332	16.86%	1,969
Iowa	1,593	48.88%	1,665	51.09%	0	0.00%	1	0.03%	-72	-2.21%	3,259
Jackson	992	65.61%	491	32.47%	29	1.92%	0	0.00%	501	33.13%	1,512
Jefferson	2,300	43.91%	2,938	56.09%	0	0.00%	0	0.00%	-638	-12.18%	5,238
Juneau	1,306	57.41%	968	42.55%	1	0.04%	0	0.00%	338	14.86%	2,275
Kenosha	1,086	48.99%	1,131	51.01%	0	0.00%	0	0.00%	-45	-2.03%	2,217
Kewaunee	226	18.57%	991	81.43%	0	0.00%	0	0.00%	-765	-62.86%	1,217
La Crosse	1,872	51.84%	1,739	48.16%	0	0.00%	0	0.00%	133	3.68%	3,611
Lafayette	1,673	50.45%	1,642	49.52%	0	0.00%	1	0.03%	31	0.93%	3,316
Lincoln	49	41.88%	68	58.12%	0	0.00%	0	0.00%	-19	-16.24%	117
Manitowoc	1,406	34.92%	2,620	65.08%	0	0.00%	0	0.00%	-1,214	-30.15%	4,026
Marathon	365	27.20%	977	72.80%	0	0.00%	0	0.00%	-612	-45.60%	1,342
Marquette	463	39.27%	716	60.73%	0	0.00%	0	0.00%	-253	-21.46%	1,179
Milwaukee	6,042	44.90%	7,415	55.10%	0	0.00%	0	0.00%	-1,373	-10.20%	13,457
Monroe	1,557	55.77%	1,235	44.23%	0	0.00%	0	0.00%	322	11.53%	2,792
Oconto	873	44.38%	1,092	55.52%	0	0.00%	2	0.10%	-219	-11.13%	1,967
Outagamie	1,198	32.25%	2,517	67.75%	0	0.00%	0	0.00%	-1,319	-35.50%	3,715
Ozaukee	460	21.75%	1,652	78.11%	0	0.00%	3	0.14%	-1,192	-56.36%	2,115
Pepin	452	62.52%	270	37.34%	0	0.00%	1	0.14%	182	25.17%	723
Pierce	1,065	57.35%	791	42.60%	0	0.00%	1	0.05%	274	14.75%	1,857
Polk	817	73.21%	299	26.79%	0	0.00%	0	0.00%	518	46.42%	1,116
Portage	1,265	60.73%	818	39.27%	0	0.00%	0	0.00%	447	21.46%	2,083
Racine	1,955	49.05%	2,031	50.95%	0	0.00%	0	0.00%	-76	-1.91%	3,986
Richland	1,522	57.33%	1,132	42.64%	0	0.00%	1	0.04%	390	14.69%	2,655
Rock	3,734	68.25%	1,718	31.40%	18	0.33%	1	0.02%	2,016	36.85%	5,471
Sauk	2,242	63.08%	1,310	36.86%	0	0.00%	2	0.06%	932	26.22%	3,554
Shawano	271	37.17%	448	61.45%	0	0.00%	10	1.37%	-177	-24.28%	729
Sheboygan	1,723	43.75%	2,215	56.25%	0	0.00%	0	0.00%	-492	-12.49%	3,938
St. Croix	1,185	42.83%	1,582	57.17%	0	0.00%	0	0.00%	-397	-14.35%	2,767
Taylor	90	49.18%	93	50.82%	0	0.00%	0	0.00%	-3	-1.64%	183
Trempealeau	1,077	64.49%	520	31.14%	0	0.00%	73	4.37%	557	33.35%	1,670
Vernon	1,784	71.94%	696	28.06%	0	0.00%	0	0.00%	1,088	43.87%	2,480
Walworth	2,825	68.89%	1,272	31.02%	3	0.07%	1	0.02%	1,553	37.87%	4,101
Washington	723	23.85%	2,305	76.02%	0	0.00%	4	0.13%	-1,582	-52.18%	3,032
Waukesha	2,533	50.72%	2,461	49.28%	0	0.00%	0	0.00%	72	1.44%	4,994
Waupaca	1,869	61.08%	1,191	38.92%	0	0.00%	0	0.00%	678	22.16%	3,060
Waushara	1,379	81.45%	313	18.49%	1	0.06%	0	0.00%	1,066	62.97%	1,693
Winnebago	3,634	57.39%	2,591	40.92%	107	1.69%	0	0.00%	1,043	16.47%	6,332
Wood	419	46.97%	473	53.03%	0	0.00%	0	0.00%	-54	-6.05%	892
Total	85,155	50.07%	84,314	49.58%	460	0.27%	141	0.08%	841	0.49%	170,070

==== Counties that flipped from Democratic to Republican ====
- Clark
- Eau Claire
- Jackson
- Lafayette
- Pierce
- Waukesha
