= 1910 Wisconsin gubernatorial election =

- November 8, 1910
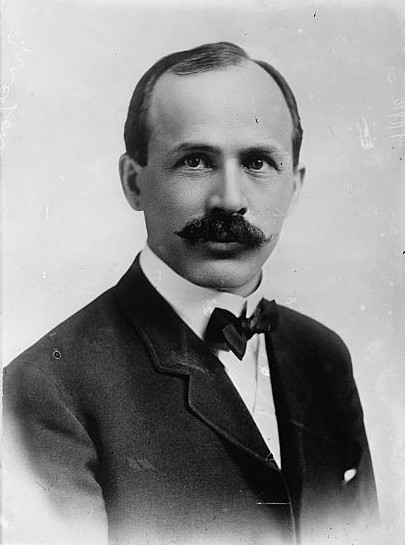

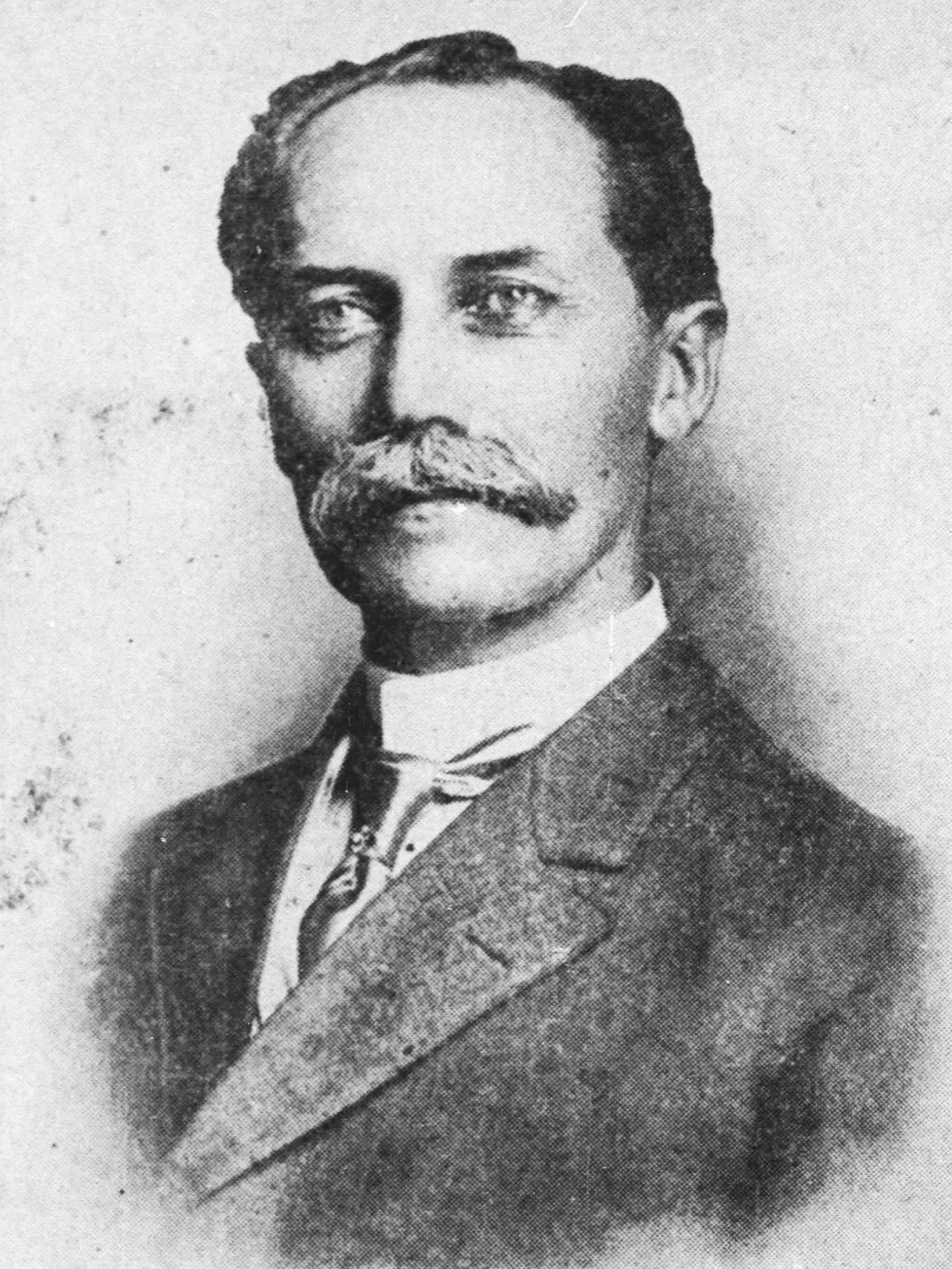

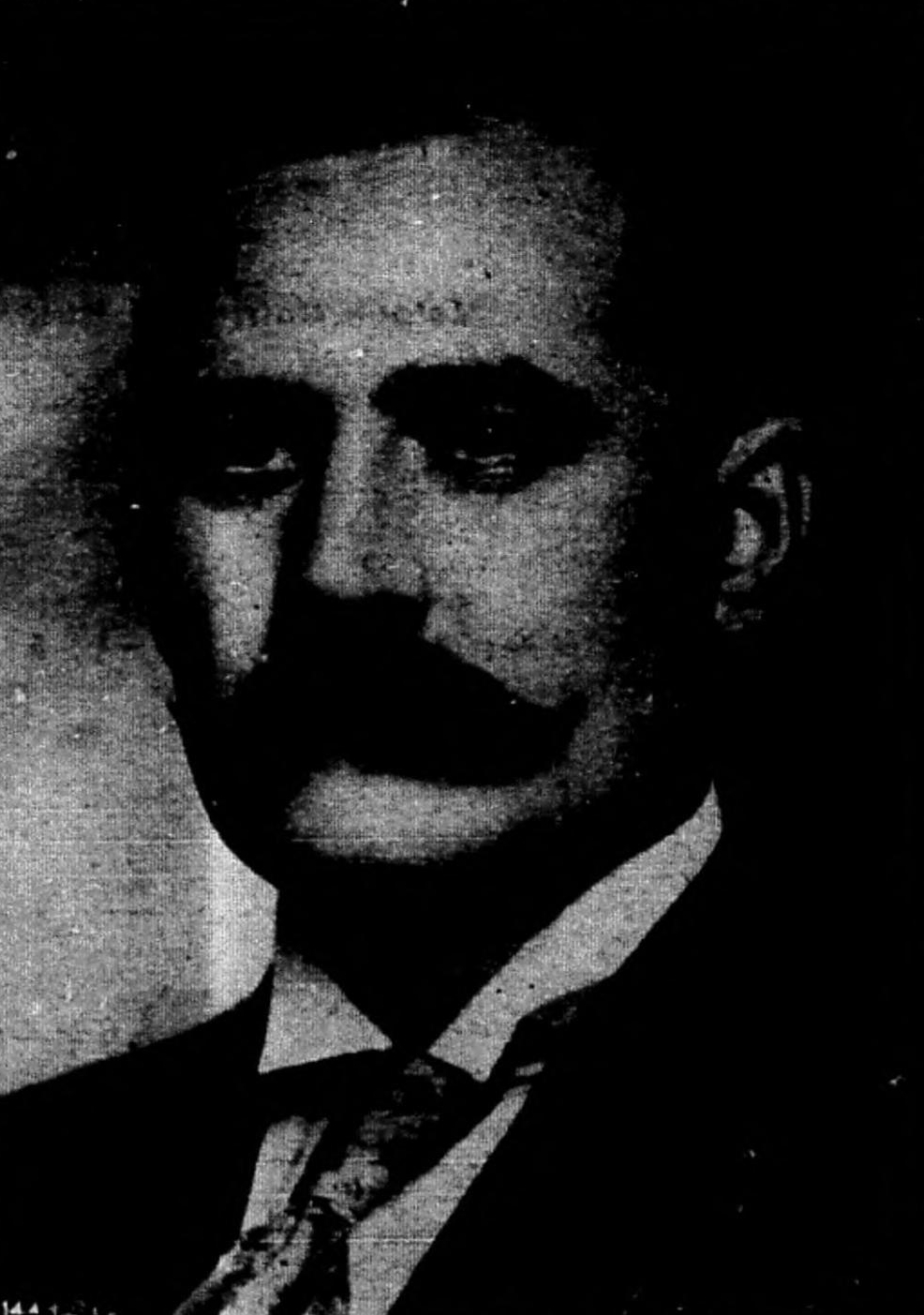
Nominee	Francis E. McGovern	Adolph J. Schmitz	William A. Jacobs
Party	Republican	Democratic	Social-Democratic
Popular vote	161,619	110,442	39,547
Percentage	50.58%	34.56%	12.38%
- County results McGovern: 40–50% 50–60% 60–70% 70–80% 80–90% Schmitz: 40–50% 50–60% 60–70% 70–80% Jacobs: 30–40%
Governor before election
James O. Davidson
Republican
Elected Governor
Francis E. McGovern
Republican

The 1910 Wisconsin gubernatorial election was held on November 8, 1910. Primary elections were held on September 6, 1910.

Republican nominee Francis E. McGovern defeated Democratic nominee Adolph J. Schmitz and Social-Democratic nominee William A. Jacobs, with 50.57% of the vote.

== Primary election ==
=== Republican party ===
==== Candidates ====
- Henry W. Barker, State Senator
- Edward T. Fairchild, State Senator
- William Mitchell Lewis, automobile manufacturer
- Francis E. McGovern, former District attorney
- John Strange, incumbent Lieutenant Governor

==== Results ====
Republican primary results
Party	Candidate	Votes	%
Republican	Francis E. McGovern	82,265	43.09%
Republican	Edward T. Fairchild	55,933	29.30%
Republican	William Mitchell Lewis	40,879	21.41%
Republican	Henry W. Barker	5,973	3.13%
Republican	John Strange	5,845	3.06%
Total votes		190,895	100.00%

=== Democratic party ===
==== Candidates ====
- Adolph J. Schmitz, lawyer, Democratic nominee for Lieutenant Governor in 1894, unsuccessful candidate for Democratic nomination for Governor in 1908

==== Results ====
Democratic primary results
Party	Candidate	Votes	%
Democratic	Adolph J. Schmitz	48,071	100.00%
Total votes		48,071	100.00%

=== Social-Democratic party ===
==== Candidates ====
- William A. Jacobs, Social-Democratic nominee for Wisconsin's 1st congressional district in 1908

==== Results ====
Social-Democratic primary results
Party	Candidate	Votes	%
Social-Democratic	William A. Jacobs	12,491	100.00%
Total votes		12,491	100.00%

=== Prohibition party ===
==== Candidates ====
- Byron E. Van Keuren, Prohibition nominee for Wisconsin's 8th congressional district in 1908

==== Results ====
Prohibition primary results
Party	Candidate	Votes	%
Prohibition	Byron E. Van Keuren	1,802	100.00%
Total votes		1,802	100.00%

== General election ==
=== Results ===
1910 Wisconsin gubernatorial election (Note: One must exercise caution using the Blue Book as a source for Wisconsin election data for the period of 1890–1920 as it was unreliable during this period. In this case, the Blue Book's totals for all candidates are incorrect and it also contains numerous mistakes in the county figures.)
Party	Candidate	Votes	%	±%
Republican	Francis E. McGovern	161,619	50.58%	−3.45%
Democratic	Adolph Schmitz	110,442	34.56%	−2.35%
Social Democratic	William A. Jacobs	39,547	12.38%	+6.02%
Prohibition	Byron E. Van Keuren	7,450	2.33%	−0.28%
Socialist Labor	Fred G. Kremer	430	0.13%	+0.05%
	Scattering	34	0.01%	
Majority		51,177	16.02%	
Total votes		319,522	100.00%	
Republican hold		Swing	-1.10%	

=== Results by county ===
Schmitz was the first Democrat since George W. Peck in 1892 to carry Kenosha County. This was also the first time since 1875 that Kenosha County did not vote for the winning candidate. Social Democratic candidate William A. Jacobs received 37.93% of the vote in Milwaukee County and won the county over McGovern; this was the best performance ever by a Socialist gubernatorial candidate in Milwaukee County.

County	Francis E. McGovern Republican		Adolph Schmitz Democratic		William A. Jacobs Social-Democratic		Byron E. Van Keuren Prohibition		Fred G. Kremer Socialist Labor		Margin		Total votes cast
County	#	%	#	%	#	%	#	%	#	%	#	%	Total votes cast
Adams	602	72.36%	158	18.99%	42	5.05%	29	3.49%	0	0.00%	444	53.37%	832 (Note: Includes 1 Scattering vote)
Ashland	1.381	59.22%	473	20.28%	386	16.55%	61	2.62%	31	1.33%	908	38.94%	2,332
Barron	1,676	73.16%	209	9.12%	262	11.44%	141	6.15%	3	0.13%	1,414 (Note: McGovern's margin over Jacobs)	61.72%	2,291
Bayfield	1,057	76.21%	97	6.99%	191	13.77%	40	2.88%	2	0.14%	866	62.44%	1,387
Brown	3,267	48.17%	2,620	38.62%	793	11.69%	91	1.34%	11	0.16%	647	9.54%	6,782
Buffalo	1,008	65.93%	470	30.74%	29	1.90%	22	1.44%	0	0.00%	538	35.19%	1,529
Burnett	848	72.17%	75	6.38%	193	16.43%	59	5.02%	0	0.00%	655	55.74%	1,175
Calumet	1,176	43.31%	1,384	50.98%	132	4.86%	20	0.74%	2	0.07%	-208	-7.66%	2,715
Chippewa	2,170	55.76%	1,418	36.43%	194	4.98%	104	2.67%	6	0.15%	752	19.32%	3,892
Clark	2,087	68.72%	720	23.71%	140	4.61%	87	2.86%	3	0.10%	1,367	45.01%	3,037
Columbia	2,653	61.36%	1,379	31.89%	172	3.98%	102	2.36%	18	0.42%	1,274	29.46%	4,324
Crawford	1,570	54.80%	1,176	41.05%	60	2.09%	56	1.95%	3	0.10%	394	13.75%	2,865
Dane	6,392	52.74%	5,113	42.19%	289	2.38%	316	2.61%	4	0.03%	1,279	10.55%	12,120 (Note: Includes 6 Scattering votes)
Dodge	2,692	35.12%	4,727	61.66%	147	1.92%	100	1.30%	0	0.00%	-2,035	-26.55%	7,666
Door	1,757	80.49%	279	12.78%	88	4.03%	54	2.47%	5	0.23%	1,478	67.70%	2,183
Douglas	2,582	66.36%	454	11.67%	695	17.86%	136	3.50%	24	0.62%	1,887	48.50%	3,891
Dunn	2,179	86.33%	156	6.18%	123	4.87%	57	2.26%	8	0.32%	2,023	80.15%	2,524
Eau Claire	2,399	69.44%	573	16.58%	350	10.13%	100	2.89%	33	0.96%	1,826	52.85%	3,455
Florence	467	79.83%	104	17.78%	7	1.20%	7	1.20%	0	0.00%	363	62.05%	585
Fond du Lac	3,834	47.33%	3,780	46.66%	312	3.85%	171	2.11%	4	0.05%	54	0.67%	8,101
Forest	726	79.00%	122	13.28%	53	5.77%	17	1.85%	1	0.11%	604	65.72%	919
Grant	2,908	59.08%	1,775	36.06%	84	1.71%	140	2.84%	15	0.30%	1,133	23.02%	4,922
Green	1,659	53.71%	1,186	38.39%	88	2.85%	153	4.95%	2	0.06%	473	15.31%	3,089
Green Lake	1,495	51.20%	1,273	43.60%	64	2.19%	88	3.01%	0	0.00%	222	7.60%	2,920
Iowa	2,004	57.47%	1,294	37.11%	42	1.20%	146	4.19%	1	0.03%	710	20.36%	3,487
Iron	738	63.08%	323	27.61%	68	5.81%	38	3.25%	3	0.26%	415	35.47%	1,170
Jackson	1,438	78.02%	282	15.30%	66	3.58%	56	3.04%	1	0.05%	1,156	62.72%	1,843
Jefferson	1,939	32.78%	3,581	60.53%	286	4.83%	107	1.81%	3	0.05%	-1,642	-27.76%	5,916
Juneau	1,571	60.24%	722	27.68%	260	9.97%	52	1.99%	3	0.12%	849	32.55%	2,608
Kenosha	1,891	40.14%	2,207	46.85%	487	10.34%	123	2.61%	3	0.06%	-316	-6.71%	4,711
Kewaunee	1,530	47.60%	1,628	50.65%	33	1.03%	20	0.62%	3	0.09%	-98	-3.05%	3,214
La Crosse	3,289	48.74%	2,874	42.59%	413	6.12%	155	2.30%	17	0.25%	415	6.15%	6,748
Lafayette	2,119	53.99%	1,725	43.95%	18	0.46%	62	1.58%	1	0.03%	394	10.04%	3,925
Langlade	1,298	49.62%	1,207	46.14%	68	2.60%	40	1.53%	3	0.11%	91	3.48%	2,616
Lincoln	1,533	46.90%	1,532	46.86%	163	4.99%	40	1.22%	1	0.03%	1	0.03%	3,269
Manitowoc	2,655	36.09%	3,919	53.28%	729	9.91%	51	0.69%	2	0.03%	-1,264	-17.18%	7,356
Marathon	2,952	38.04%	4,087	52.66%	555	7.15%	158	2.04%	9	0.12%	-1,135	-14.62%	7,761
Marinette	2,423	63.50%	617	16.17%	588	15.41%	167	4.38%	21	0.55%	1,806	47.33%	3,816
Marquette	1,282	64.20%	642	32.15%	21	1.05%	50	2.50%	2	0.10%	640	32.05%	1,997
Milwaukee	20,291	33.09%	16,896	27.55%	23,264	37.93%	819	1.34%	57	0.09%	-2,973 (Note: Jacobs' margin over McGovern)	-4.84%	61,327
Monroe	2,389	58.68%	1,419	34.86%	165	4.05%	92	2.26%	6	0.15%	970	23.83%	4,071
Oconto	2,036	59.72%	1,148	33.68%	177	5.19%	43	1.26%	5	0.15%	888	26.05%	3,409
Oneida	1,109	57.91%	441	23.03%	347	18.12%	18	0.94%	0	0.00%	668	34.88%	1,915
Outagamie	3,488	47.95%	3,425	47.08%	214	2.94%	143	1.97%	5	0.07%	63	0.87%	7,275
Ozaukee	662	32.03%	1,304	63.09%	86	4.16%	14	0.68%	1	0.05%	-642	-31.06%	2,067
Pepin	633	59.21%	392	36.67%	17	1.59%	26	2.43%	1	0.09%	241	22.54%	1,069
Pierce	1,635	81.59%	188	9.38%	87	4.34%	87	4.34%	4	0.20%	1,447	72.21%	2,004 (Note: Includes 3 Scattering votes)
Polk	1,494	79.30%	83	4.41%	233	12.37%	73	3.87%	0	0.00%	1,261	66.93%	1,884
Portage	2.079	53.90%	1,559	40.42%	144	3.73%	70	1.81%	0	0.00%	520	13.48%	3,857 (Note: Includes 5 Scattering votes)
Price	1,638	72.35%	221	9.76%	332	14.66%	64	2.83%	6	0.27%	1,306	57.69%	2,264
Racine	3,206	51.30%	1,824	29.18%	925	14.80%	277	4.43%	18	0.29%	1,382	22.11%	6,250
Richland	1,611	54.76%	997	33.89%	92	3.13%	238	8.09%	3	0.10%	614	20.87%	2,942
Rock	3,168	66.06%	1,059	22.08%	318	6.63%	228	4.75%	23	0.48%	2,109	43.97%	4,796
Rusk	992	74.81%	91	6.86%	211	15.91%	29	2.19%	3	0.23%	781	58.90%	1,326
Sauk	2,318	52.11%	1,815	40.80%	42	0.94%	272	6.12%	1	0.02%	503	11.31%	4,448
Sawyer	634	86.85%	64	8.77%	16	2.19%	14	1.92%	2	0.27%	570	78.08%	730
Shawano	1,995	61.50%	1,121	34.56%	63	1.94%	64	1.97%	1	0.03%	874	26.94%	3,244
Sheboygan	3,951	44.00%	3,870	43.10%	1,013	11.28%	134	1.49%	8	0.09%	81	0.90%	8,980 (Note: Includes 4 Scattering votes)
St. Croix	2,354	60.78%	1,261	32.56%	148	3.82%	107	2.76%	3	0.08%	1,093	28.22%	3,873
Taylor	1,074	53.04%	623	30.77%	295	14.57%	32	1.58%	0	0.00%	451	22.27%	2,025
Trempealeau	1,844	62.28%	994	33.57%	37	1.25%	84	2.84%	2	0.07%	850	28.71%	2,961
Vernon	2,277	72.75%	635	20.29%	84	2.68%	132	4.22%	2	0.06%	1,642	52.46%	3,130
Vilas	532	72.09%	59	12.87%	89	12.06%	18	2.44%	4	0.54%	437	59.21%	738
Walworth	2,533	60.35%	1,295	30.86%	99	2.36%	268	6.39%	1	0.02%	1,238	29.50%	4,197
Washburn	855	75.53%	138	12.19%	115	10.16%	23	2.03%	1	0.09%	717	63.34%	1,132
Washington	2,068	45.01%	2,293	49.90%	198	4.31%	35	0.76%	1	0.02%	-225	-4.90%	4,595
Waukesha	3,601	52.31%	2,508	36.43%	599	8.70%	176	2.56%	0	0.00%	1,093	15.88%	6,884
Waupaca	2,903	77.54%	510	13.62%	212	5.66%	115	3.07%	4	0.11%	2,393	63.92%	3,744
Waushara	1,597	79.06%	273	13.51%	94	4.65%	52	2.57%	0	0.00%	1,324	65.54%	2,020
Winnebago	5,474	54.61%	3,759	37.50%	582	5.81%	193	1.93%	15	0.15%	1,715	17.11%	10,023
Wood	1,931	44.20%	1,780	40.74%	558	12.77%	94	2.15%	5	0.11%	151	3.46%	4,369
Total	161,619	50.58%	110,442	34.56%	39,547	12.38%	7,450	2.33%	430	0.13%	51,177	16.02%	316,522

==== Counties that flipped from Republican to Democratic ====
- Kenosha
- Manitowoc
- Marathon

==== Counties that flipped from Democratic to Social Democratic ====
- Milwaukee

== Bibliography ==
- Glashan, Roy R. (1979). American Governors and Gubernatorial Elections, 1775-1978. Meckler Books. ISBN 0-930466-17-9.
- Gubernatorial Elections, 1787-1997. Washington, D.C.: Congressional Quarterly Inc. 1998. ISBN 1-56802-396-0.
- Beck, J. D., ed. (1911). The Blue Book of the state of Wisconsin. Madison, Wisconsin: Democrat Printing Company, State Printer.
