= Lewis Ludington =

Real estate developer and founder of Columbus, Wisconsin, USA

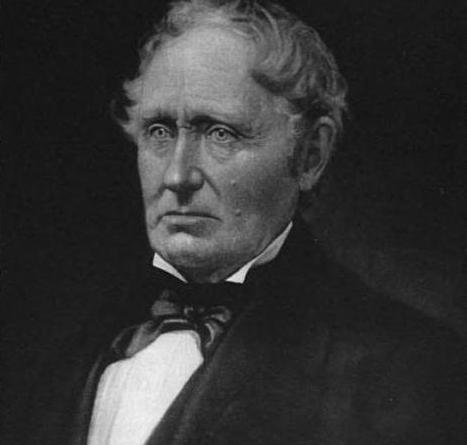
- Lewis Ludington, c. 1855
- Born: June 25, 1786; Kent, New York
- Died: September 3, 1857 (aged 71); Keshena, Wisconsin

Lewis Ludington (June 25, 1786 – September 3, 1857) was a real estate developer who helped settle Columbus, Wisconsin.

== Personal life ==
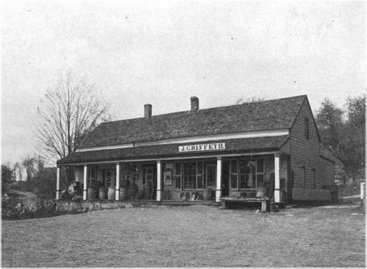
Store at Kent, New York, built by Lewis Ludington and Frederick Ludington, c. 1808

Ludington's father, Henry Ludington of the Ludington family, was a soldier in the French and Indian War. Henry married his cousin Abigail on May 1, 1760. They had twelve children, all born in Kent, New York (then known as Fredericksburgh). Lewis was youngest, born on June 25, 1786. His sister, Sybil Ludington, was the oldest and born on April 5, 1761.

Ludington was partners with his brother Frederick in a store near their home in Kent, New York.

== Settling Columbus, Wisconsin ==
Bird's eye view of Columbus, Wisconsin, in Columbia County, c. 1868

Ludington entered into a deal with Elbert Dickason to improve land in Wisconsin Territory. Dickason built a cabin on this land acreage along the Crawfish River and dammed up the river for a sawmill and gristmill. Dickason was unable to meet his payments to Ludington and Ludington took back the property.

Ludington's Plat was recorded on November 11, 1844 a plot of nine blocks, and other additions were recorded through 1850.

== Sources ==
- Butterfield, Consul Willshire (1880). History of Columbia County, Wisconsin. Western Historical. p. 665.
- Johnson, Willis Fletcher (1907). Colonel Henry Ludington: A Memoir. his grandchildren L.E. Ludington and C.H. Ludington.
- Jones, James Edwin (4 September 2016). History of Columbia County. FB&C Limited. ISBN 978-1-333-47058-6.
