= Willis Fletcher Johnson =

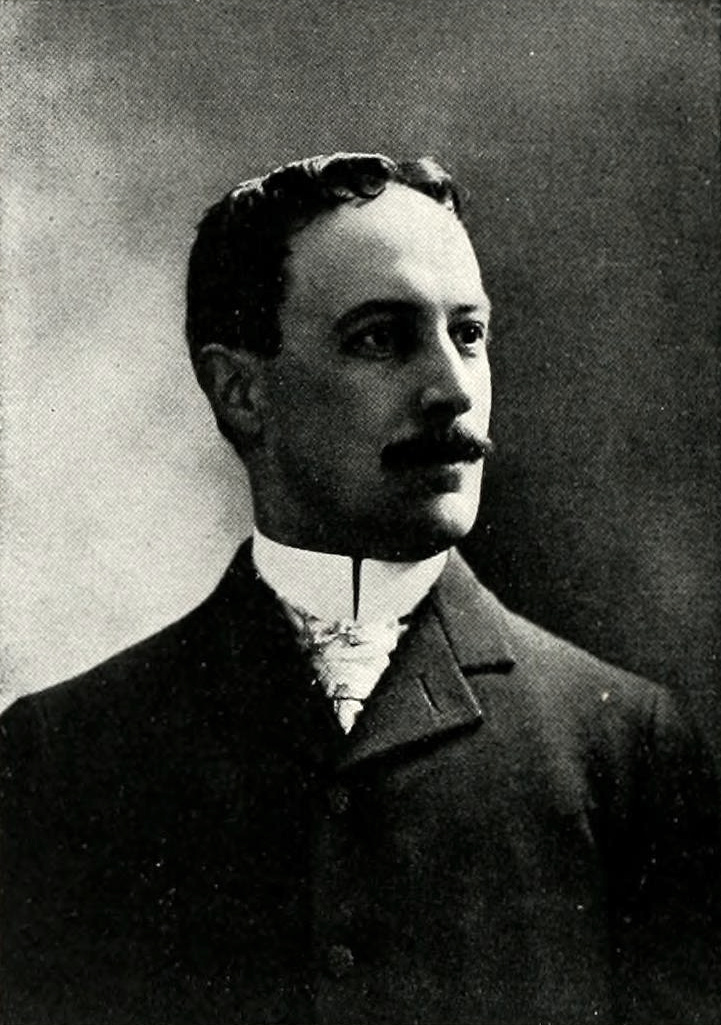

Willis Fletcher Johnson (1857 – March 29, 1931), was an author, journalist, and lecturer who had a twenty-year tenure as the foreign and diplomatic editorial writer for The New York Tribune.

== Critical reception ==
According to Paula Hunt, writing in The New England Quarterly in 2015, Johnson's Colonel Henry Ludington: A Memoir was published privately by Ludington's grandchildren, Charles H. and Lavinia Elizabeth Ludington. The biography, according to Hunt, "offers a laudatory account" of the colonel's life; Hunt states that it "was certainly not of the order of Johnson’s usual projects", noting that it was omitted from his New York Times obituary. She writes that the New England Historical & Genealogical Register reviewed it as a "charming, simple memoir", which she says was intended to "remedy a belief that the Revolution-era militia and its officers had not received the recognition they deserved and to ensure the colonel's place in American history", citing page vii of the Memoirs. She characterized the work as a "not wholly reliable source".

== Works ==
Some of Johnson's works include:

- Life of Wm. Tecumseh Sherman.
- Colonel Henry Ludington A Memoir
- The History of Cuba. 1921. Gutemberg Project

== Sources ==
- Hunt, Paula D. (June 2015). "Sybil Ludington, the Female Paul Revere: The Making of a Revolutionary War Heroine". The New England Quarterly. 88 (2): 187–222. doi:10.1162/TNEQ_a_00452. ISSN 0028-4866. S2CID 57569643.
- Johnson, Willis Fletcher (1891). Life of Wm. Tecumseh Sherman. Edgewood Publishing Company.
- Johnson, Willis Fletcher (1907). Colonel Henry Ludington A Memoir. New York: Lavinia Elizabeth Ludington & Charles Henry Ludington.
