= Henry Ludington =

18th and 19th-century American Army commander

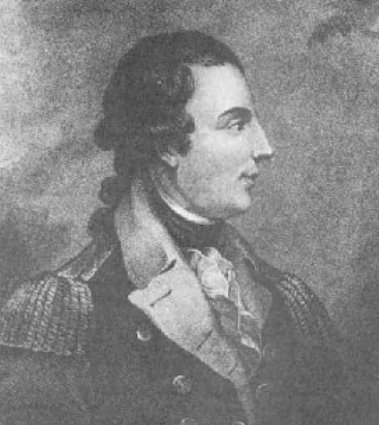
- Henry Ludington sketch, circa 1800
- Born: May 25, 1738; Branford, Connecticut
- Died: January 24, 1817 (aged 78)
- Occupations: Businessman, patriot, Colonel
- Known for: Role in American Revolution

Henry Ludington (May 25, 1738 – January 24, 1817) was an American soldier in the American Revolutionary War. He aided the effort by providing spies and was associated with John Jay in a ring of spies.

== Early life ==
Ludington's father, William Ludington, was born in Branford, Connecticut, on September 6, 1702. He married Mary Knowles in 1730. Ludington was born in Branford on May 25, 1738 as the third of eight children. His older sisters were Submit and Mary, and Lydia, Samuel, Rebecca, Anne, and Stephen were younger than him. He went to school in Branford and received an education typical for colonial towns of the 18th century.

== Military ==
Ludington enlisted in the Connecticut Provincial Forces in September 1755, at the age of seventeen. He was with Captain Foote's company of the Second Connecticut Regiment. He re-enlisted on April 19, 1756, served under Colonel Andrew Ward at Crown Point, and was discharged on November 13, 1756. He was called back again for fifteen days of service for the relief of Fort William Henry in August 1757. He re-enlisted on April 14, 1759, for the campaign of the Second Connecticut Regiment under Colonel Nathan Whiting and was a member of David Baldwin's Third Company. He served in the French and Indian War from 1755 to 1760 and was in the Battle of Lake George where he witnessed the death of his uncle and cousin. He marched to Canada and participated in the Battle of Quebec on September 13, 1759. He then proceeded from Boston to Branford, Connecticut, in the spring of 1760 and retired from the military.

Ludington returned to civilian life and married his cousin Abigail on May 1, 1760. She was born on May 8, 1745, and was turning fifteen years old. They had twelve children, all born in Kent, New York, (then known as Philipse Upper Patent) and raised the family on a 229 acre farm.

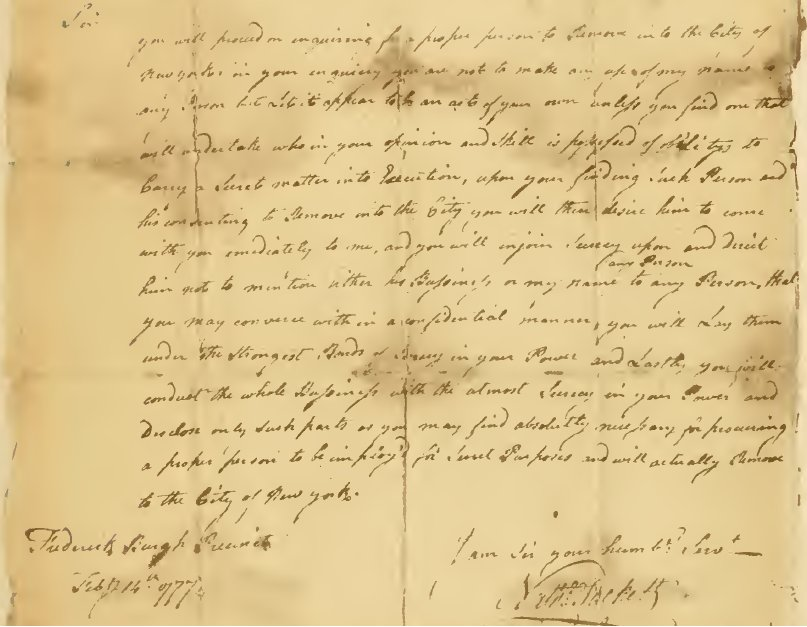
February 14, 1777 letter from Nathaniel Sackett to Ludington

Ludington was commissioned a lieutenant in recognition of his service. He resigned at the enactment of the Duties in American Colonies Act in 1765. He was affiliated with George Washington's intelligence in the American Revolutionary War; the military commander Nathaniel Sackett asked Ludington for help to furnish spies in Dutchess and Westchester Counties, New York, to gather information on British activities.

Ludington collaborated with Enoch Crosby, an American Revolutionary War soldier who worked in the same territory. A shoemaker by trade, while traveling for his trade Crosby was able to obtain critical information important to Washington. Ludington aided Crosby with the objective to get information to American patriots. He also helped other spies, among them Benajah Tubbs and John Jay.

== Family ==
One of Colonel Ludington's daughters, Sybil Ludington, has received widespread recognition for a 40-mile horseback ride to alert her father's Minute Men troops to gather and meet the British army. A 2015 report in The New England Quarterly says there is little evidence backing the story; whether the ride occurred has been questioned since at least 1956.

Ludington was the grandfather of Harrison Ludington, who was the 12th governor of Wisconsin.

== Death and legacy ==
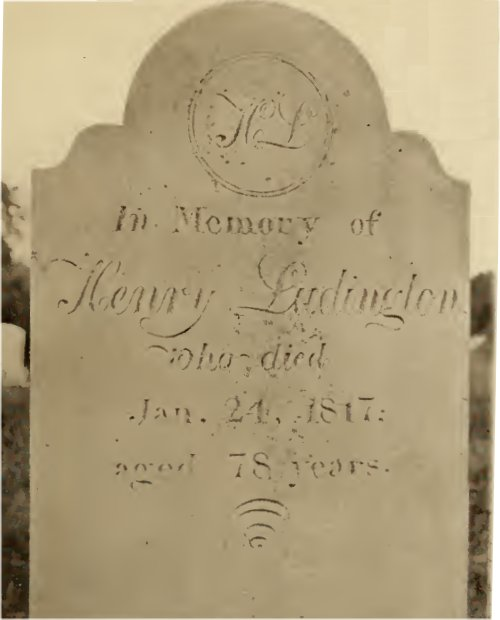
Ludington tombstone

Ludington died at the age of 78 on January 24, 1817, and was buried in the churchyard of the town's Presbyterian church. The grave is marked with a tombstone that has a short inscription:

H. L.

In Memory of
Henry Ludington
Jan. 24, 1817
Aged 78 years

His wife, Abigail, died at the age of 80 on August 3, 1825, and is buried beside him.

== Sources ==
- Beers, J. H. (1897). Commemorative Biographical Record of the Counties of Dutchess and Putnam, New York. Chicago: J.H. Beers & Co. OCLC 763133816.
- Beers, J.H. (1905). Genealogical and biographical record of New London County, Connecticut : containing biographical sketches of prominent citizens. Chicago: J.H. Beers. OCLC 750787773.
- De Forest, Louis Effingham (1926). Ludington-Saltus records. New Haven, Connecticut: Tuttle, Morehouse & Taylor. OCLC 608679375.
- Johnson, Willis Fletcher (1907). Colonel Henry Ludington: A Memoir. Printed by his grandchildren Lavinia Elizabeth Ludington and Charles Henry Ludington : New York. ISBN 978-0548540381.
- Miller, Francis Trevelyan (1907). Journal of American History. American Records. OCLC 24088243.
- Patrick, Louis S. (1907). The Connecticut Magazine. Connecticut Magazine Company. OCLC 17941131.
- Pelletreau, William Smith (1886). Putnam County, New York. W.W. Preston. p. 691. OCLC 829938001.
- White, J.T. (1904). National Cyclopaedia of Biography. OCLC 936240315.
