= The New England Quarterly =

- Discipline: History of New England
- Language: English
- Edited by: Holly Jackson

Publication details
- History: 1928-present
- Publisher: MIT Press for The New England Quarterly Inc. (United States)
- Frequency: Quarterly

Standard abbreviations
- ISO 4: N. Engl. Q.

Indexing
- ISSN: 0028-4866 (print); 1937-2213 (web)
- JSTOR: 00284866
- OCLC no.: 1759778

Links
- Journal homepage; Online access; Online archive

The New England Quarterly is a peer-reviewed academic journal consisting of articles on New England's cultural, literary, political, and social history. The journal contains essays, interpretations of traditional texts, essay reviews, and book reviews. The New England Quarterly was established in 1928 and is published by MIT Press for The New England Quarterly Inc., a nonprofit sponsored by the University of Massachusetts Boston and the Colonial Society of Massachusetts, and supported by the Massachusetts Cultural Council. MIT Press began publishing the journal in 2007.
