= Sybil Ludington =

American woman (1761–1839)

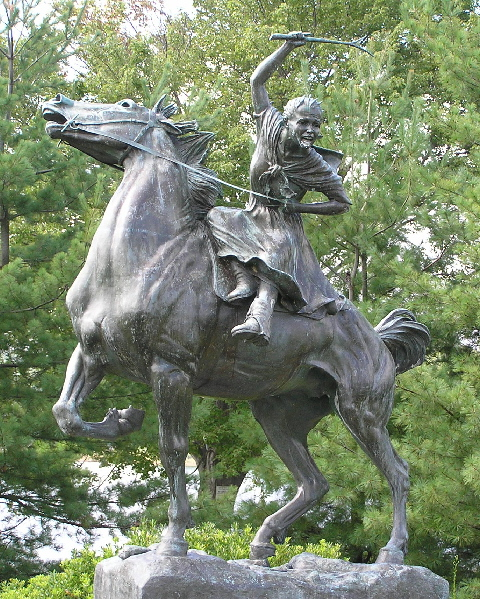
- Born: April 5, 1761
- Died: February 26, 1839 (aged 77); Unadilla, New York
- Spouse: Edmond Ogden (m. 1784; died 1799)

Sybil (or Sibbell) Ludington (April 5, 1761 – February 26, 1839) was an alleged heroine of the American Revolution and daughter of Patriot colonel Henry Ludington. Relatives of Ludington have claimed that on April 26, 1777, at age 16, she made an all-night horseback ride 40 miles (64 km) to stir American militiamen to attack British forces near Danbury, Connecticut, though scholars largely reject this story. According to the legend, Ludington rode near the Connecticut–New York border after British forces raided and burned Danbury, rallying combatants for the Battle of Ridgefield the following day.

Printed accounts of Ludington's ride first appeared in an 1880 local history and then a 1907 posthumous publication by her grandchildren of her father's memoirs, with Ludington often described as a female Paul Revere. A 2015 report in The New England Quarterly concludes there is little actual evidence backing the story, and whether the ride even occurred has been questioned, with skepticism going back at least to 1956.

Relatively unknown through the 19th century, Ludington's story gained recognition around the time of World War II, after New York State was convinced to place historic roadmarkers in locations she was speculated to have visited on her ride. Attention to her story grew thereafter, from memorial statues honoring her, to books being written about her, culminating with being honored on a United States Bicentennial postage stamp that was released on March 25, 1975, which depicts her on a horse.

== Early life, family and death ==
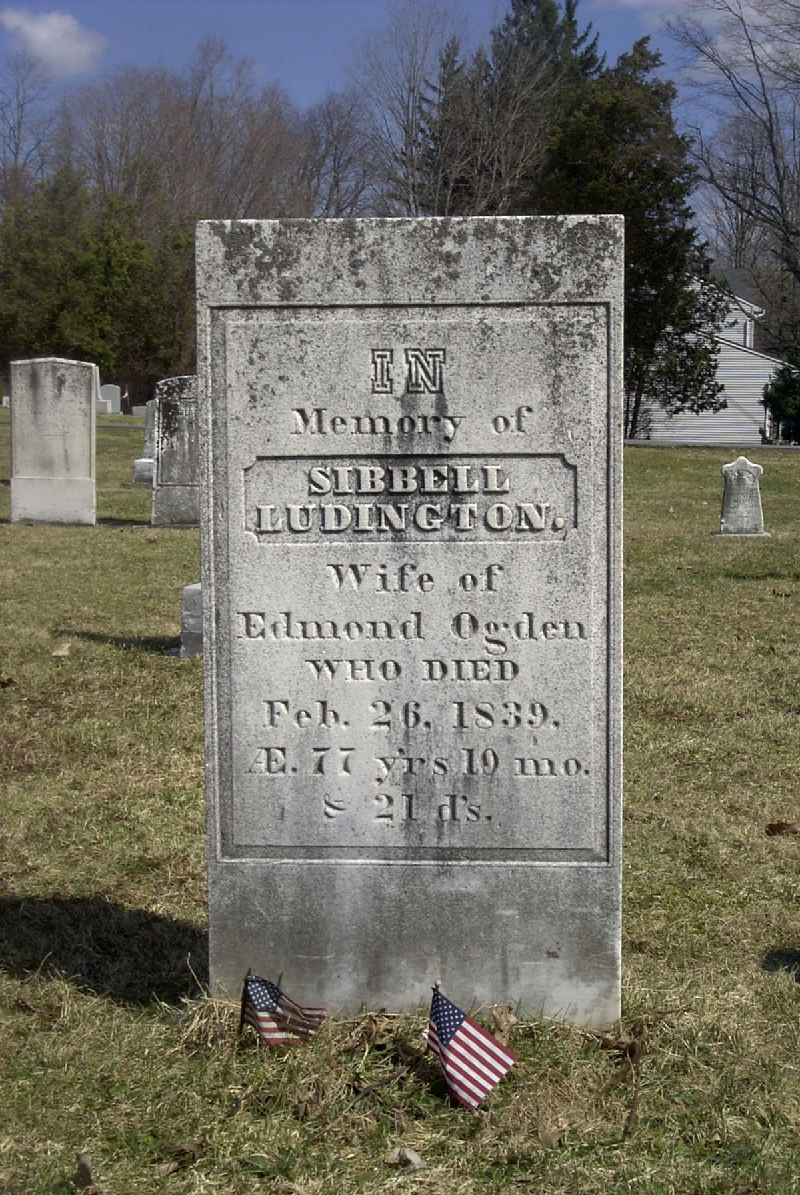
Grave of Sybil Ludington, bearing a spelling variation of her first name

Ludington was born on April 5, 1761, in Fredericksburg, New York. She was the first of 12 children of Abigail (Note: Abigail was Henry's cousin, according to Johnson.) and Henry Ludington, a gristmill owner. According to his relatives, Sybil's father had fought in the French and Indian War, and volunteered to head the local militia during the Revolutionary War.

At the age of 23, in 1784 Ludington married Edmond Ogden. They had a son named Henry in 1786. (Note: A New York Times article says Ludington raised six children.) In 1792, the family settled in Catskill, New York, and Ogden died in 1799. In 1811 Ludington moved to Unadilla, New York.

Ludington lived in Unadilla until her death on February 26, 1839, at the age of 77. She was buried near her father in the Patterson Presbyterian Cemetery in Patterson, New York (previously, her hometown of Fredericksburg). Her tombstone shows a variant spelling of her first name.

== Ludington's ride ==
Accounts, which did not emerge until the 20th century about her alleged 18th-century ride, recognize Ludington as a heroine of the American Revolutionary War.

=== Historical accounts ===
Accounts originating in the 20th century, from the Ludington family, say Sybil played an important role immediately after the British raid on Danbury, Connecticut. According to the story printed 140 years after the alleged feat, on April 26, 1777, then-16-year-old Sybil Ludington rode 40 miles (64 km) from her hometown in Fredericksburg, New York (near Danbury, Connecticut) through Putnam County, New York, to rally approximately 400 militiamen under the command of her father, Colonel Henry Ludington, after British forces raided Danbury, where the Continental Army had a supply depot. American troops from New York and Connecticut rallied to engage the British the next day in the Battle of Ridgefield, forcing them to retreat.

A brief mention (Note: Ludington's ride is covered in 2 out of the 300 pages of the relevant memoir.) of Ludington's ride was published in 1907 as part of the collected memoirs of Colonel Henry Ludington (Sybil's father), privately printed by his grandchildren some 90 years after his death. (Note: The privately published Colonel Henry Ludington, a Memoir is characterized by Hunt as "a not wholly reliable source".) Modern accounts say Ludington was congratulated for her heroism by General George Washington; however, more recent scholarship has raised doubt that the ride even took place.

=== Research history ===
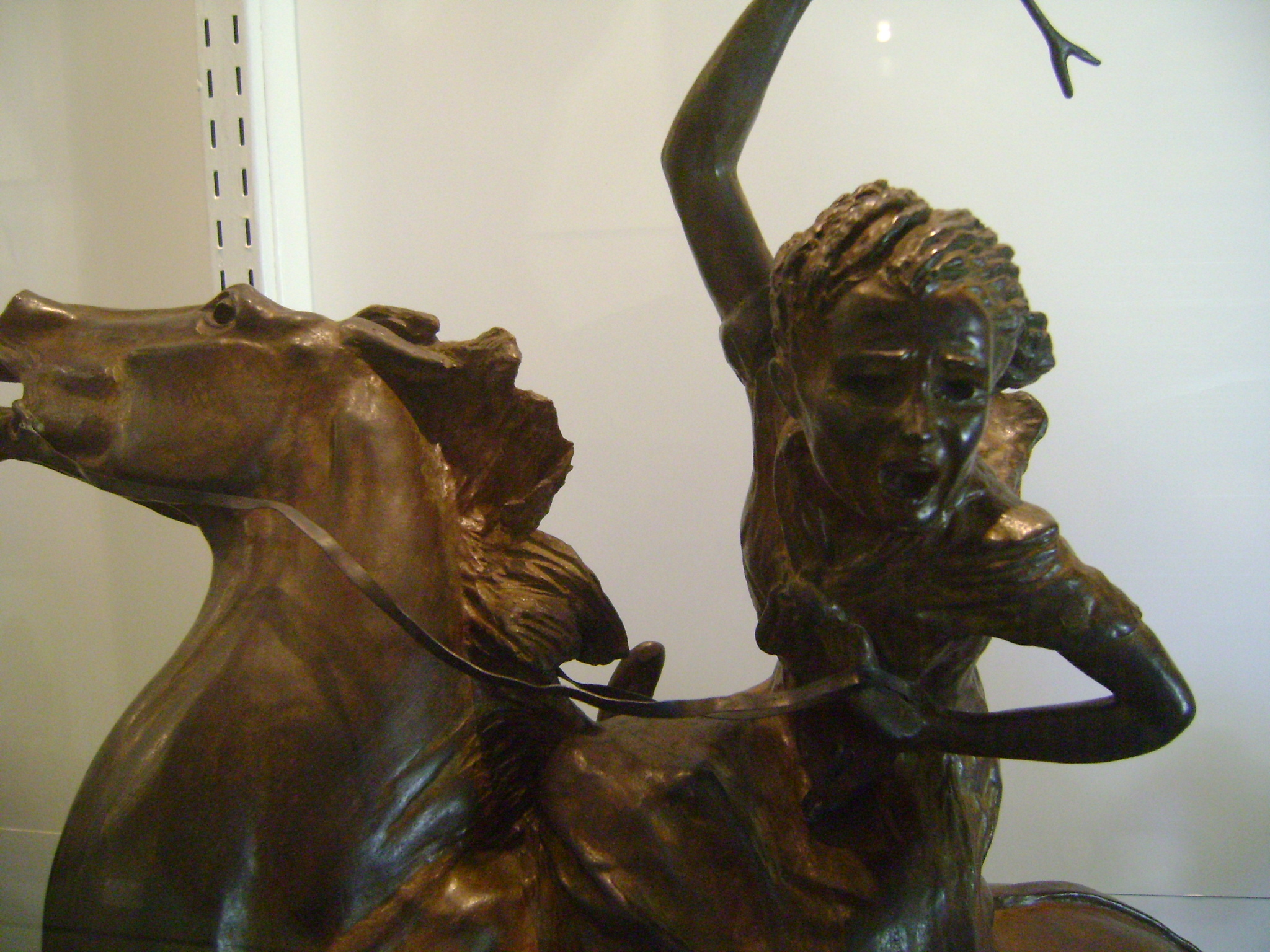
Close-up of smaller version of a statue representing Ludington by Anna Hyatt Huntington at Brookgreen Gardens, South Carolina

A 2022 Smithsonian magazine article written by Abigail Tucker states that the earliest known record of the 1777 account of Ludington's ride came in 1854 from Sybil's nephew, Charles H. Ludington, who sought to have his aunt recognized as a hero. Ludington was included in an 1880 book about the New York City area by local historian Martha Lamb. The memoirs of Ludington's father, which include a reference, were printed in 1907.

Tucker states that letters written by Ludington herself do not mention the ride. Accounts vary as to whether she rode bareback or sidesaddle, what the name of the horse was, and how her name was spelled (Sybil, Cybal, Sibyl, Sebil, Sybille, or Sibbell). Spelling variations were more common at the time.

In 1838, Ludington asked for a pension based on her husband, Ogden, having fought in the Revolutionary War, but she could not prove that she was married to him. According to Paula Hunt, writing in The New England Quarterly journal, "None of the sworn affidavits attesting to Henry Ogden’s military service and the legitimacy of Sybil's marriage mentioned her ride, nor did she attempt to claim it as justification for a pension."

Lamb stated that her account relied on sources including letters, sermons, genealogical compilations, wills, and court records to document details. She cites no sources, nor provides documentation of the ride. Hunt suggests the account may have been told to Lamb by Ludington's descendants.

Owing partly to a lack of contemporary accounts, Hunt raises questions about the events. She writes that neither of the original publications about the ride "had offered any information about Sybil's course", and the purported route was devised speculatively by the project managers who later installed historic markers, a "relatively inexpensive but increasingly popular means for states and localities to promote tourism". The installation of the historic roadside markers beginning in 1934 – although based on speculative locations according to Hunt – led to publications that propelled Sybil to the status of a heroine by 1937, and the publication of a 1940 poem about her brought the story to a national audience. Doubts about the story had been raised as early as 1956; contrasting it to the Betsy Ross story, Hunt cites Henry Noble McCracken's, Old Dutchess Forever! The Story of an American County and two New York news articles from 1995, writing that:

In Sybil's case, the state-sanctified historical roadside markers, statue, and postage stamp celebrating her ride, and the many books and newspaper and magazine articles that retold her story, had created an aura of authority that effectively dispelled any intermittent bouts of skepticism.

Hunt has provided a history of how the Ludington story has been portrayed in the media and literature, and in efforts to promote tourism. Pollak wrote in 1975 in the New York Times that "Many children's books treat the account as historical fact", although the Putnam County Historian indicated there was "no solid evidence that Sybil actually made the ride". Hunt states that many popular details were fiction, such as the horse named Star, the stick she held, and the distance of 40 miles. Hunt states that the two accounts of Ludington's ride were not mentioned in any other significant history produced in the same era, and that even as stories of heroic women of the colonial era proliferated by the 1870s, the only published accounts of Ludington were Lamb's and Johnson's. She writes:

Sybil's ride embraces the mythical meanings and values expressed in the country's founding. As an individual, she represents Americans' persistent need to find and create heroes who embody prevalent attitudes and beliefs.

Hunt concludes, "The story of the lone, teenage girl riding for freedom, it seems, is simply too good not to be believed."

Contemporaneous sources suggest that the Americans, including the residents of Danbury, were already aware of the approaching British forces, as noted in The New-York Gazette and the Weekly Mercury, May 19, 1777, which stated:

On Saturday, the 26th of April, express came to Danbury from Brigadier General Silliman, advising that a large body of enemy had landed the day before at sun set, at Compo, a point of land between Fairfield and Norwalk, and were marching toward Danbury. Measures were immediately taken.

In 1996, the national Daughters of the American Revolution (DAR) said that the evidence was not strong enough to support their criteria for a war heroine, and added a note to an exhibition saying of the ride, "It's a great story, but there is no way to know whether or not it is true." The DAR chapter near her historic home says that her exploit was documented, and it continues to honor her.

J. L. Bell, a researcher on the Revolutionary War in New England, observed: "Women, sometimes men, involved in raising children would tell stories of the family's involvement in historical events, presenting those stories simply as educational, as inspirational, as entertaining, not expecting them to be put into the public realm ... But the children who are hearing those stories grow up ... [and] want these stories, which they believe to be gospel truth, out for everyone to hear." Bell stated: "I have to classify the story of Sybil Ludington as legend, not a documented Revolutionary event."

== Legacy and honors ==
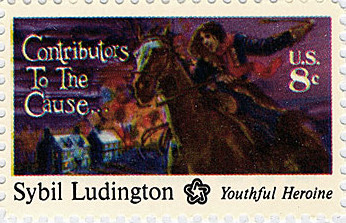
Sybil Ludington commemorative stamp

In 1934, New York State began to install a number of historic markers along Ludington's route.

A commemorative sculpture by Anna Hyatt Huntington was erected at Lake Gleneida near Carmel, New York, in 1961. Smaller versions of the statue are at the Daughters of the American Revolution headquarters in Washington, D.C., the public library in Danbury, Connecticut, and at Brookgreen Gardens, Murrells Inlet, South Carolina.

In 1975, Ludington was honored with a postage stamp in the "Contributors to the Cause" United States Bicentennial series. The National Rifle Association of America instituted the Sybil Ludington Women's Freedom Award in 1995.

Composer Ludmila Ulehla wrote the 1993 chamber opera Sybil of the American Revolution based on the story of Ludington's ride. In 2014, Ludington was featured on the American Heroes Channel documentary American Revolution: Patriots Rising. The movie Sybil Ludington: The Female Paul Revere was produced in 2010.

== See also ==
- Betsy Ross – credited by relatives with making the first US flag; accounts dismissed by historians
- Laura Secord, Canadian heroine of War of 1812
- Women in the American Revolution

== Sources ==
- Bohrer, Melissa Lukeman (2003). Glory, Passion, and Principle: The Story of Eight Remarkable Women at the Core of the American Revolution. Simon and Schuster. ISBN 0-7434-5330-1.
- Hunt, Paula D. (June 2015). "Sybil Ludington, the Female Paul Revere: The Making of a Revolutionary War Heroine". The New England Quarterly. 88 (2): 187–222. doi:10.1162/TNEQ_a_00452. ISSN 0028-4866. S2CID 57569643.
- Johnson, Willis Fletcher (1907). Colonel Henry Ludington: A Memoir. Printed by his grandchildren Lavinia Elizabeth Ludington and Charles Henry Ludington : New York. ISBN 978-0548540381. (Project Gutenberg file)(google books)
- Lamb, Martha Joanna; Harrison, Mrs. Burton (1880). History of the City of New York: The century of national independence, closing in 1880, vol. 2. A. S. Barnes. pp. 159–60, vi.
