= William Rath =

German-American businessman (1849–1916)

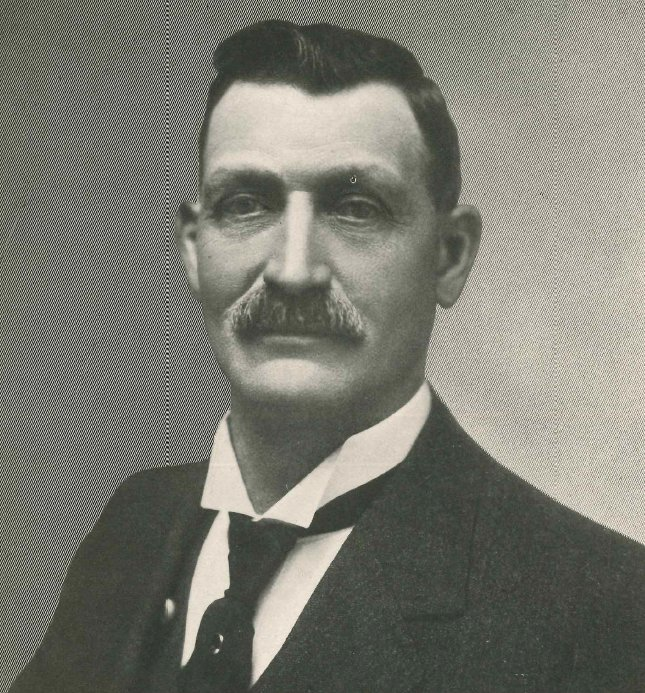
- Rath in 1912
- Born: January 28, 1849; Hamburg, Germany
- Died: August 10, 1916 (aged 67); Ludington, Michigan, U.S.
- Resting place: Cartier Memorial Park, Lakeview Cemetery; Ludington, Michigan
- Education: German public schools
- Occupations: businessman, lumberman
- Known for: developing Mason County and Ludington, Michigan
- Title: General Manager, Mayor
- Spouse: Lucy Rickhoff
- Children: 3

Signature
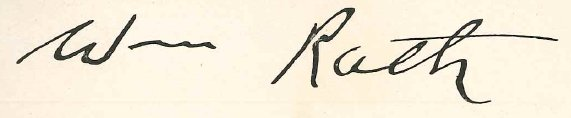

William Albert L. Rath (January 28, 1849 – August 10, 1916) was a German-American businessman and politician living in the United States who helped develop Ludington, a harbor town on Lake Michigan in Mason County, Michigan. He was in the lumber business and also was involved in banking and other businesses. He was mayor of Ludington for one term and a member of the town's board of trade and board of aldermen as well as the county's board of supervisors. He is memorialized in Ludington by a street, a building, and a mural.

== Early life ==
William Rath was born in Hamburg, Germany on January 28, 1849. His father, Hans, lived his entire life in Germany, while his mother, Mary, eventually came to America. Rath grew up in Hamburg and attended public schools there. His family was from modest circumstances and the education he gained there was rudimentary. He served as an apprentice locksmith, but did not complete his apprenticeship. He then assisted his father, who was a mason, and learned to stucco buildings.

After emigrating to America at the age 21, Rath arrived in Ludington in June 1870.

== Mid life ==
Rath married Lucy Rickhoff (1848–1932), who was also of German descent, on July 17, 1870 following a courtship that began in Germany. They had a daughter and adopted two daughters. Rath became a naturalized citizen of the United States in 1885.

The couple were active members of the local German Lutheran church, St. John's Lutheran, and he was in charge of the church's efforts to plan and raise monies for a bigger building for their congregation.

Initially as a laborer in Ludington sawmills, Rath was eventually promoted to lumber inspector. He was a member of the Ludington Board of Trade from its beginning, becoming the board's president for two years in the mid-1910s. He was also a collector of customs beginning in 1895. One of his other duties was to keep records on the number and tonnage of train ferries coming through the port.

Rath became a part of the firm Weimer & Rath by 1880. In 1890, he filed for bankruptcy after falling victim to a copper mining investment fraud. He was able to recover from this setback, and developed a partnership with Ludington businessman Warren Antoine Cartier; together they formed the lumber business of Rath & Cartier. But the decline of the lumbering industry in the late 1800s threatened the economic well-being of many Western Michigan towns, including Ludington.

In 1901, Rath started the Ludington State Bank with Charles G. Wing. Rath and Wing also founded another bank in Mason County called Fountain Bank. Rath was also involved with Cartier in the Star Watch Case Company, and was president of the Manistee Watch Company. Rath, often with Cartier, was involved in other companies. These included the Gile Boat & Engine Company, the Phoenix Basket Company, the United Home Telephone Company, and an inn in nearby Manistee County. Overall, a writer for the Mason County Historical Society has credited Rath as being one of the people, along with Antoine Ephrem Cartier and Justus Smith Stearns, who helped Ludington transition away from lumber and into other business activities.

A Republican, Rath was a member of the Ludington board of aldermen for ten years and served on the county board of supervisors representing Ludington. He was elected mayor of Ludington in 1910 for a one-year term. He ran for a second term in 1911, but was defeated by one vote.

Rath owned a number of properties in Mason and Manistee counties, including a cottage on the south beach at Epworth Heights, a Ludington summer resort. He was the first president of the resort's country club. Rath and Antoine Ephrem Cartier bought the Cartier Park land near Lincoln Lake Rath also owned commercial property in Chicago. Through these real estate holdings he became a wealthy man.

== Death and memorials ==
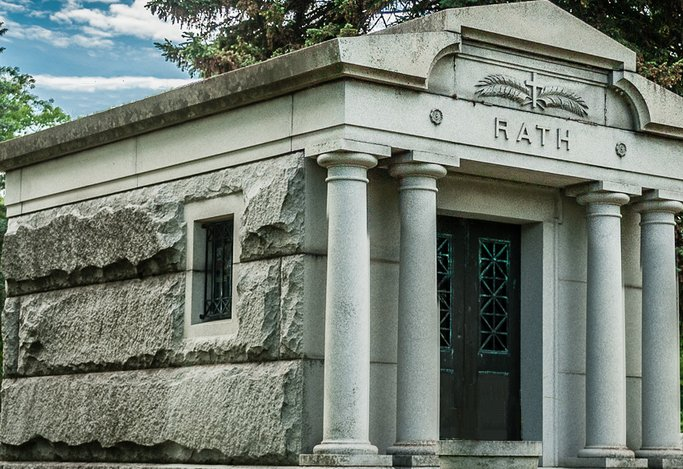
Rath mausoleum

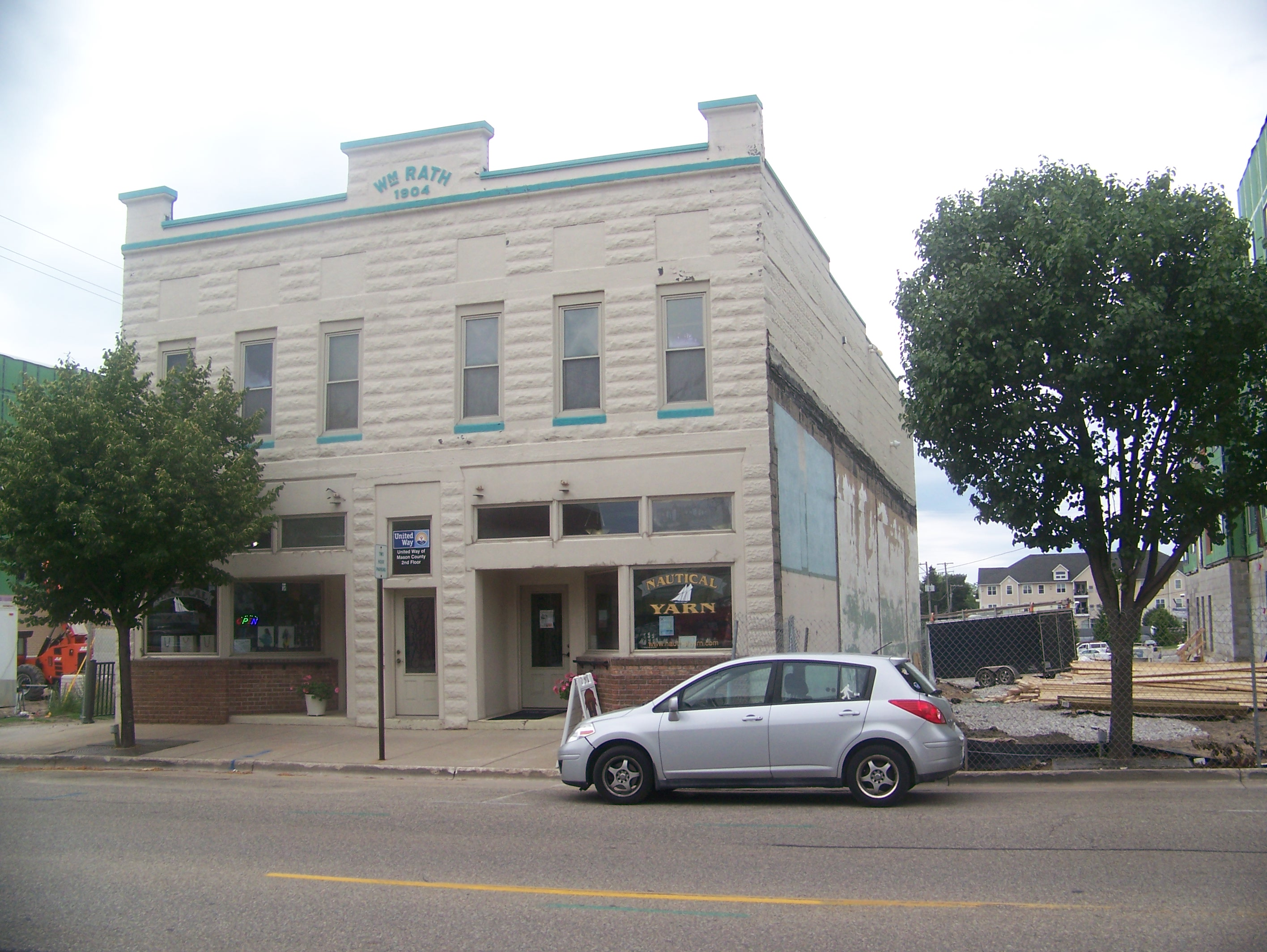
William Rath building in Ludington

Rath died at his home, from suspected heart failure, on August 10, 1916. His remains are interred at Lakeview Cemetery in Ludington. His will included $25,000 towards improvement of Cartier Park.

Charles Street, which had been named for a relative of James Ludington's, was renamed Rath Avenue in 1921. The Wm. Rath Building stands on that street and its presence also helps keep Rath's name alive. Built in 1904, it has historic status and cannot be demolished. Rath is also memorialized in a mural showing him drinking from a Fountain of Youth, which, as a description of the mural states, was "something that was in vogue in the late 1800s." The mural is located on Rath Avenue and was painted by Ludington artist Therese Soles.
