= Stearns Hotel =

Historic hotel in Ludington, Michigan, United States

Coordinates: 43°57′18.9″N 86°26′43.8″W

Stearns Hotel is a historic hotel in Ludington, Michigan, in the United States. Built in 1903 by Justus Stearns, a leading businessman in Ludington ranging from banking, lumbering, mining and many other endeavors throughout the Midwestern United States. The Stearns Hotel opened on July 1, 1903. For the first five years H.S. Read, a well known and accomplished hotel manager in Northern Michigan, was contracted to manage the building. It was known for being one of the finest furnished hotels in the area. It is remembered as being one of the first hotels in West Michigan to have in-room plumbing (hot and cold water), phones in every room (including long distance), automatic sprinklers throughout the hotel, and bath in nearly every room, which made it a high end hotel for its time. When built the hotel held 90 rooms within its three-story structure (and basement). The hotel had a beautiful front entrance with a porch. Much like today, the hotel advertised to have a beautiful bridal room (today it is referred to as the ballroom).

The porch was replaced in 1974 by a one-story structure for offices or rental. Glen Bowden, the owner since 1965, then added on a drive up ramp to the second level.

Stearns Hotel is also known for the Osawald Crumb Tap room, which was based on a character created by Robert Stearns.

The Ludington Salt and Bath house was added to the west side of Stearns Hotel in 1904. The bath house was advertised to be connected to the hotel through a passageway and operated under hotel management. It was used for treatment of rheumatism, skin and blood diseases, kidney and liver troubles, nervous and digestive disorders and for general toning up the system. When described the house was said to have a front office area when walking through the front door, reception was to the left. On the right there was a hall leading to the dressing rooms. There were six dressing rooms, six salt baths and one fresh water bath. Also, there was a steam room, cooling room, hot room, and toilet room. The best feature was considered to be the 10-foot-high (3.0 m) gymnasium which was 20 by 40 feet (6.1 m × 12.2 m) on the second floor.

The famous Stearns Hotel was also known for operating in connection with Hotel Epworth, now known as Epworth Heights.
