= Ludington (surname) =

Ludington is an English surname. It is the American variant to the name Luddington. Notable people with the surname include:

- Charles Cameron Ludington, American professor
- Charles Townsend Ludington (1896–1968), American businessman and aviator
- Harrison Ludington (1812–1891), American politician
- Henry Ludington (1739–1817), American army commander and businessman
- Jake Ludington (born 1973), American writer
- James Ludington (1827–1891), American businessman
- Lewis Ludington (1786–1857), American businessman
- Nelson Ludington (1818–1883), American businessman
- Ronald Ludington (1934–2020), American skater and coach
- Sybil Ludington (1761–1839), American revolutionary figure

== See also ==
- Ludington (disambiguation)
- Ludington family
