= Loddington =

Loddington may refer to:

- Loddington, Leicestershire, England
- Loddington, Northamptonshire, England
- a species of apple, see Commons:Category:Loddington (apple)

== See also ==
- Luddington (disambiguation)
