= Ludington =

Ludington may refer to:

== Places ==
United States

- Ludington, Michigan, a city
  - Ludington Pumped Storage Power Plant
- Ludington, Montana, an unincorporated community
- Ludingtonville, New York, a hamlet
- Ludington, Ohio, an unincorporated community
- Ludington, Wisconsin, a town
  - Ludington (community), Wisconsin, an unincorporated community

== People ==
- Ludington (surname)
- Ludington family, the American family whose members immigrated from the United Kingdom

== Other ==
- Tug Ludington, a World War II era tugboat, now a historical site
