= Warren Antoine Cartier =

American mayor

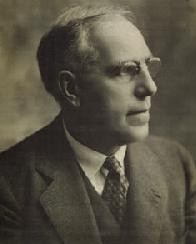
- Born: January 12, 1866; Manistee, Michigan, US
- Died: November 7, 1934 (aged 68)
- Resting place: Pere Marquette cemetery, Ludington, Michigan
- Education: Civil engineer from Notre Dame
- Occupations: businessman, lumberman, general manager, secretary, treasurer, mayor, banker, manufacturer
- Known for: developing Ludington, Michigan
- Spouse: Catherine (Kate) Dempsey (m. 1888)
- Children: 3
- Parent(s): Antoine E. Cartier; Eliza N. Ayers

Warren Antoine Cartier (January 12, 1866 – November 7, 1934) was a 19th-century businessman. He was twice elected mayor of the Ludington, Michigan, and was a banker, and a lumber tycoon. In civic life, he was involved with many societies and organizations.

== Early life ==
Warren Antoine Cartier's father was Antoine E. Cartier. He was born on January 12, 1866, in Manistee, Michigan. His family moved to Ludington, Michigan, when he was twelve years old.

Cartier attended church schools and public schools, and a Varennes business college near Montreal for two years. He then enrolled at Indiana's University of Notre Dame in 1884 at the age of 18 and graduated in 1887 with a civil engineering degree.

== Personal life ==
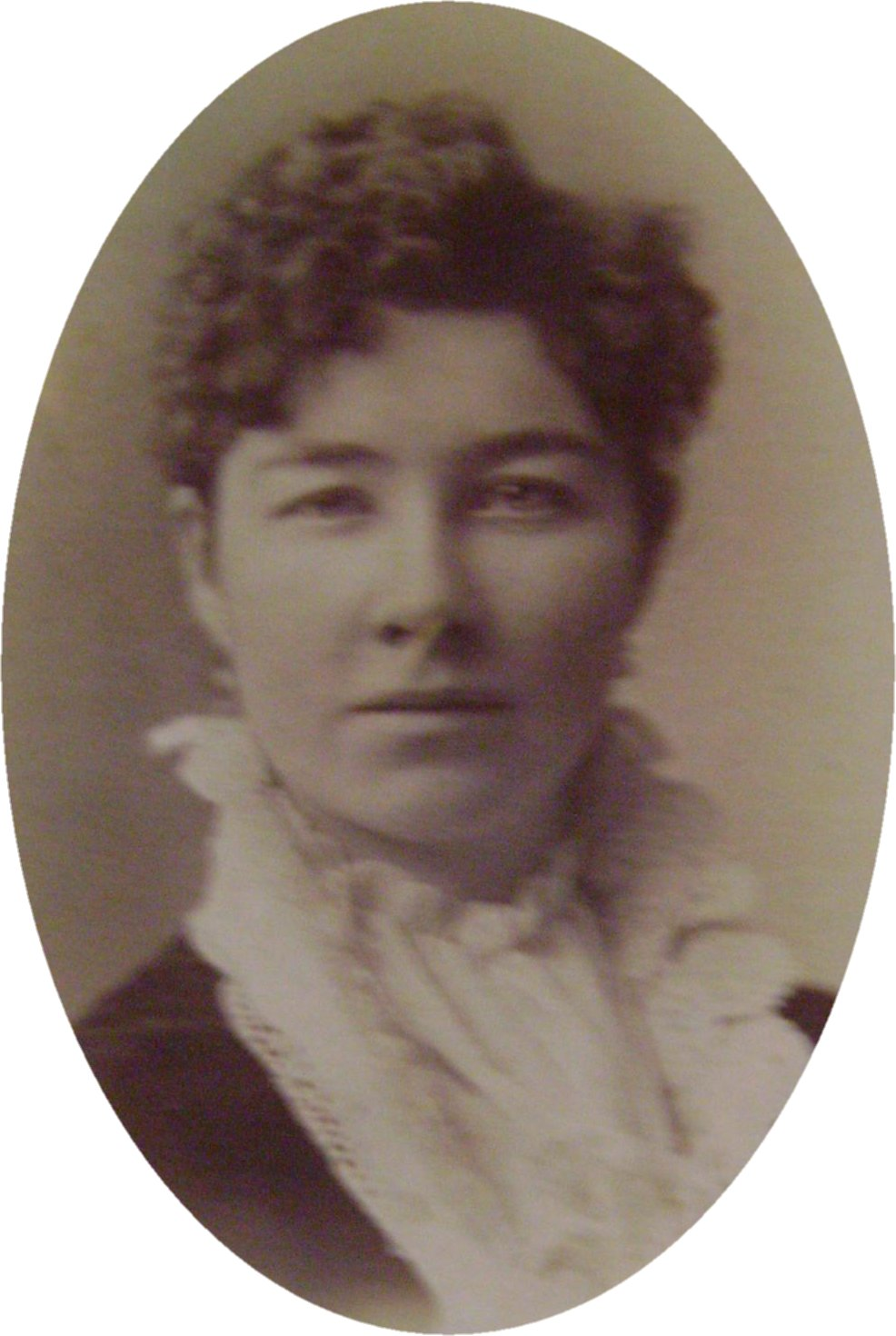
Kate Dempsey c1888

Cartier married Catherine Dempsey on May 22, 1888. They had three sons.

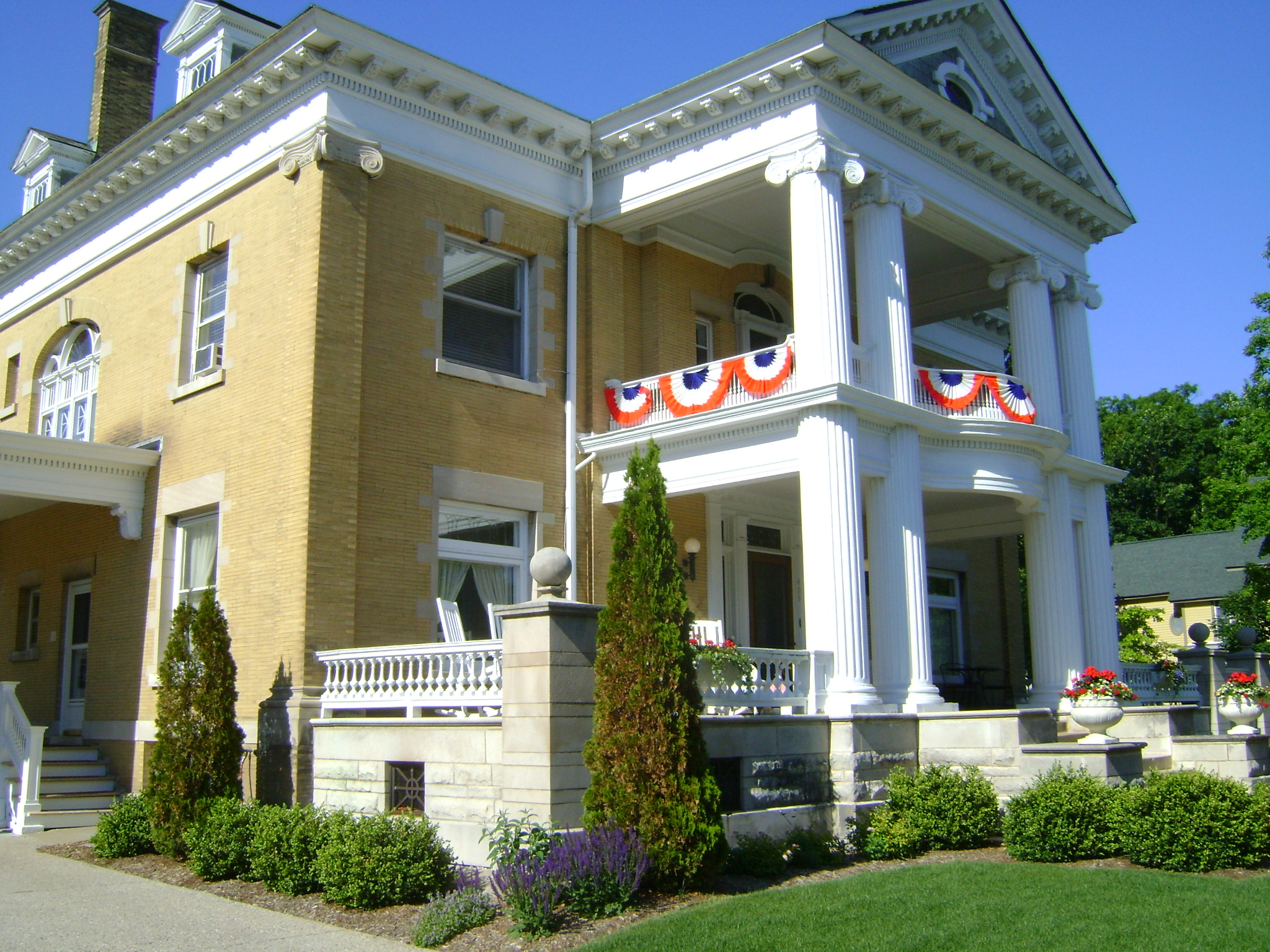
Warren A. Cartier house, Ludington

The Cartier's residence was the Warren A. and Catherine Cartier House at Ludington, Michigan. They also had a home at Poincians Park in Fort Myers, Florida.

Cartier and his wife were Catholic and attended St. Simon Church of Ludington.

Cartier supported the Republican party, serving as secretary of the Mason County Republican committee for two years. He was the Ludington city mayor in 1899 and 1903. He served two years as the city recorder.

== Career ==
After college, Cartier returned to Ludington and joined his father's Cartier Lumber Company.

Cartier also held the following positions:

- Cartier-Magmer Company – secretary and treasurer
- Star Watch Case Company – secretary
- State Bank of Ludington – president
- Bank of Fountain, Mason County – vice–president
- Mason County Real Estate Company – vice–president
- Rath & Cartier – partner in a lumber company
- Ludington State Bank – founder
- Ludington Gas Company – founder
- United Home Telephone Company – founder
- Electric Tamper & Equipment Company – president

== Associations ==
Warren A. Cartier in 1920

Cartier was connected with or a member of the Knights of Columbus, Benevolent and Protective Order of Elks (BPOE), Knights of the Maccabees, Royal Arcanum, and the Catholic Mutual Benefit Association (he was president of the state association of Michigan for nine years; also a member of the board of trustees). He was also recording secretary of the National Catholic Extension Society and past grand knight of the Pere Marquette council of the Knights of Columbus. He was knighted to the Order of St. Gregory the Great.

== Death ==
Cartier died suddenly of a heart attack at age 68 in Chicago on November 7, 1934, while receiving medical attention for a kidney problem.
