= Burr Caswell =

American frontiersman (1807–1896)

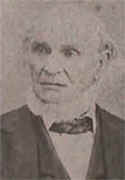
- Born: 3 January 1807; Glens Falls, New York, US
- Died: 15 September 1896 (aged 89)
- Resting place: Lakeview Cemetery, Ludington, Michigan
- Other name: Aaron Burr Caswell
- Occupations: lumberman, lighthouse keeper, civil servant, probate judge, surveyor, fish inspector, coroner for Mason County
- Known for: developing Mason County
- Spouse(s): First wife Hannah Green, second wife Sarah
- Children: 4

Aaron Burr Caswell (1807–1896) was an American frontiersman and the first white man to occupy any part of Mason County, Michigan. He became the county's first coroner, probate judge and surveyor; and constructed its first framed building that functioned as a home, courthouse and jail—it is also the only surviving landmark of Mason County's earliest history.

== Early life ==
Caswell was born in 1807 as Aaron Burr Caswell at Glens Falls, New York. His parents were George and Sarah (Green) Caswell.

Caswell practiced woodworking as his first trade for several years in Glens Falls. Caswell married Hannah Green in 1837 at Glens Falls, where they remained through 1839. They went to Mississippi in 1840 and were employed on the river boats. In 1841, he moved his family to Barrington Station, Lake County, Illinois, where they bought a farm and lived for six years.

== Mid life ==
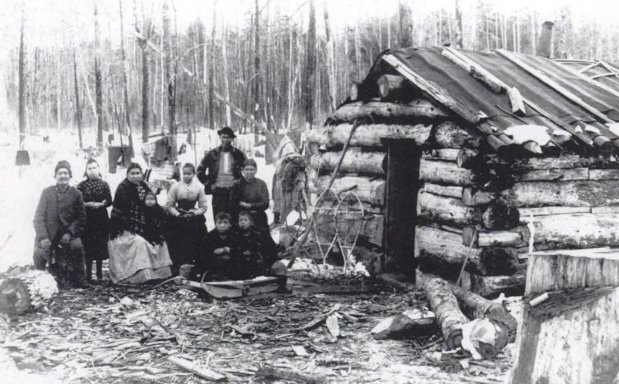
Ottawa family with bark and log house, c. 1885

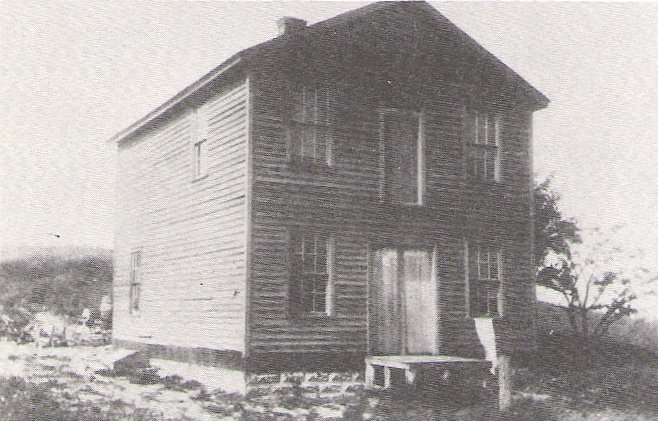
Burr Caswell house in 1865

Caswell went on a hunting and fishing trip in 1845 to Pere Marquette Township in Mason County, Michigan. He hunted in the territory for the next two years, though he spent most of his time fishing. He briefly returned to Illinois in 1847 to retrieve his family for relocating back to the Michigan area permanently.

Caswell's house was the first frame structure in Mason County; it still stands at White Pine Village where it was placed as the Mason County Historical Society's outdoor museum's centerpiece, very close its original constructed location. The Mason County Courthouse county seat was located at Caswell's house. For many years, Caswell produced lumber and shingles from the local timber and it was shipped to Chicago for construction. He operated the boat Ranger for years to deliver his lumber products.

== Later life ==
In 1871, Caswell married Sarah Billings. They moved into the Big Sable Point Lighthouse in 1873, where Caswell eventually became its lightkeeper.

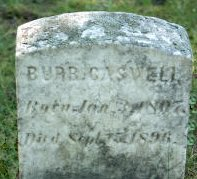
Caswell's tombstone
Lakeview Cemetery

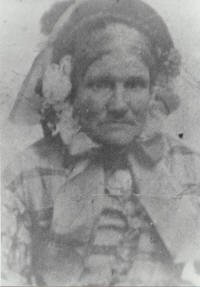
Hannah Green, Caswell's first wife

== Caswell's home ==
Aside from the second floor, Caswell's home was used as the site of the first Pere Marquette Township meeting: the front half of his home was the site of the first county seat and the first courthouse in Mason County, the kitchen served as the county's first store and post office, and the basement was used as a temporary jail. The building is recognized as a Registered State Historic Site, and the house was fully restored by the Mason County Historical Society between 1965 and 1976.

Caswell's house as the first Mason County courthouse
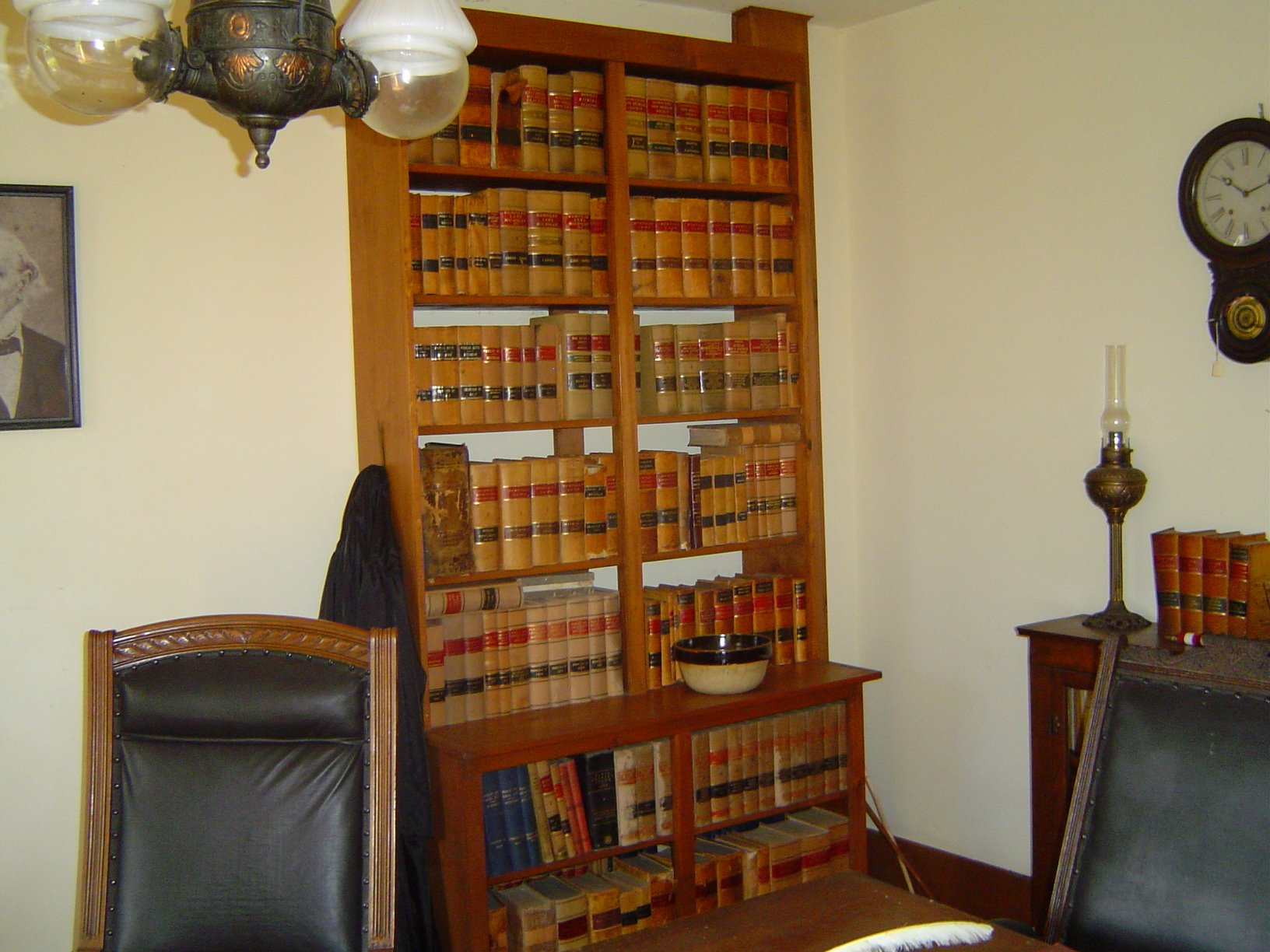

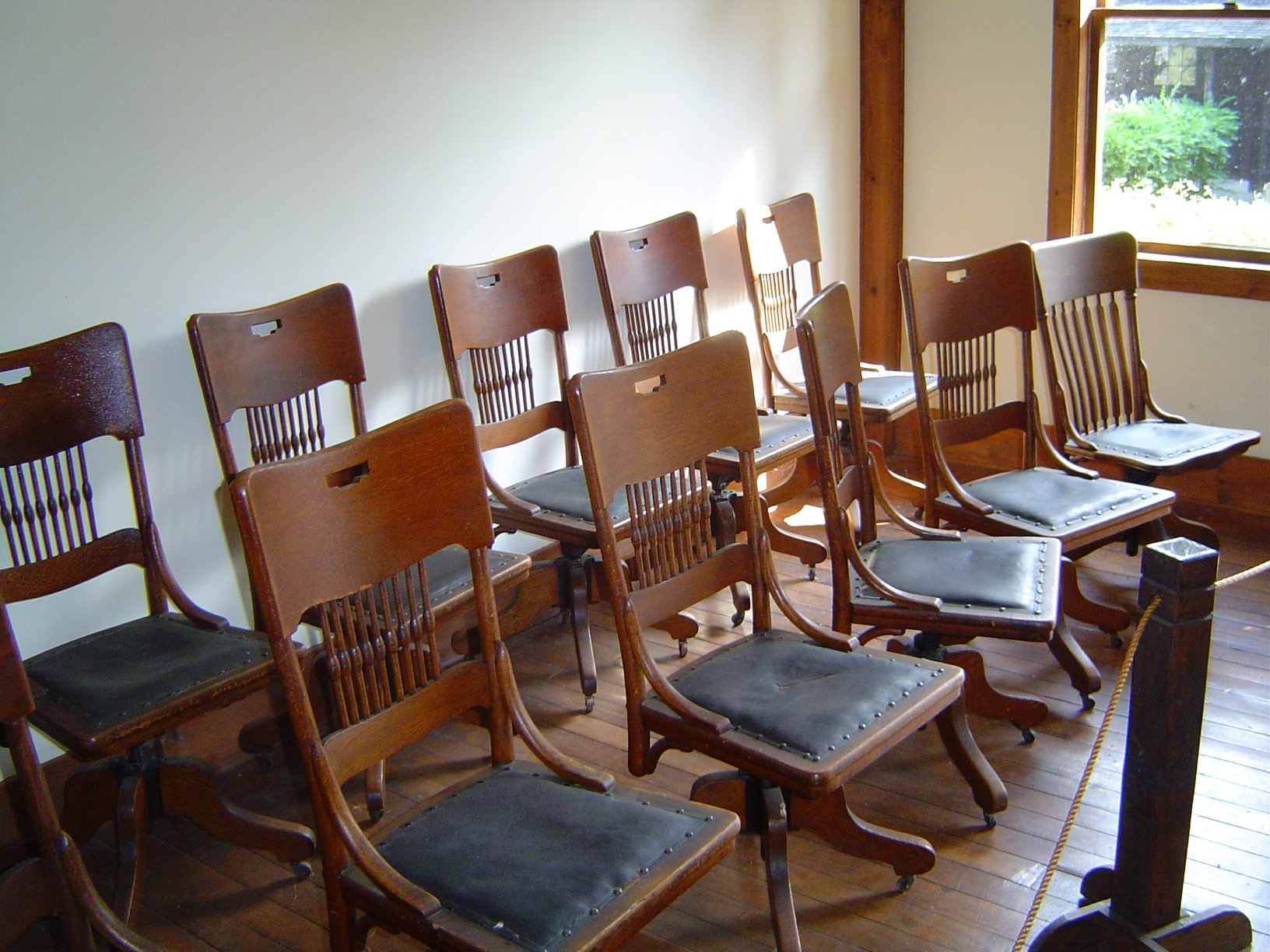

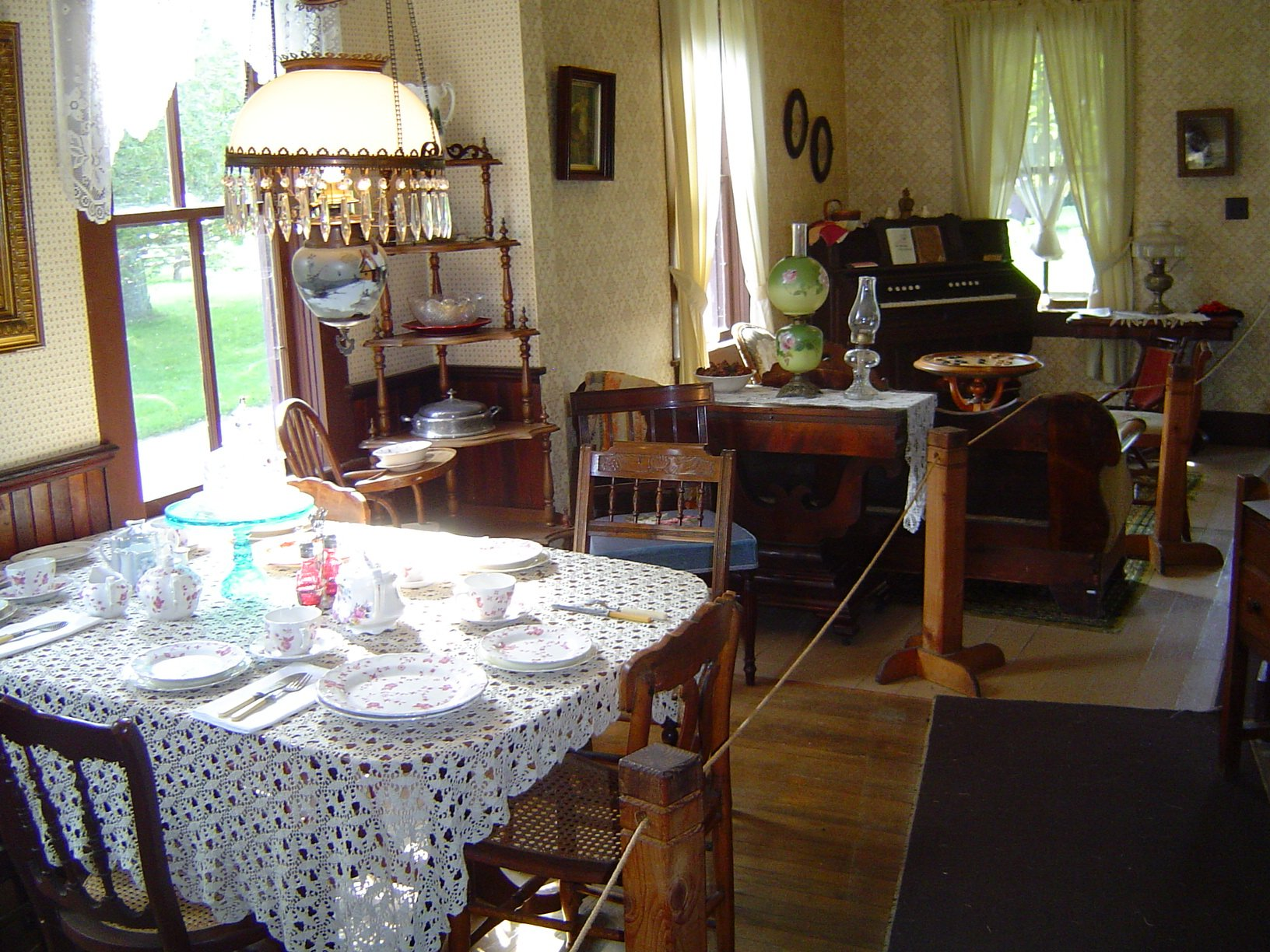
Dining area

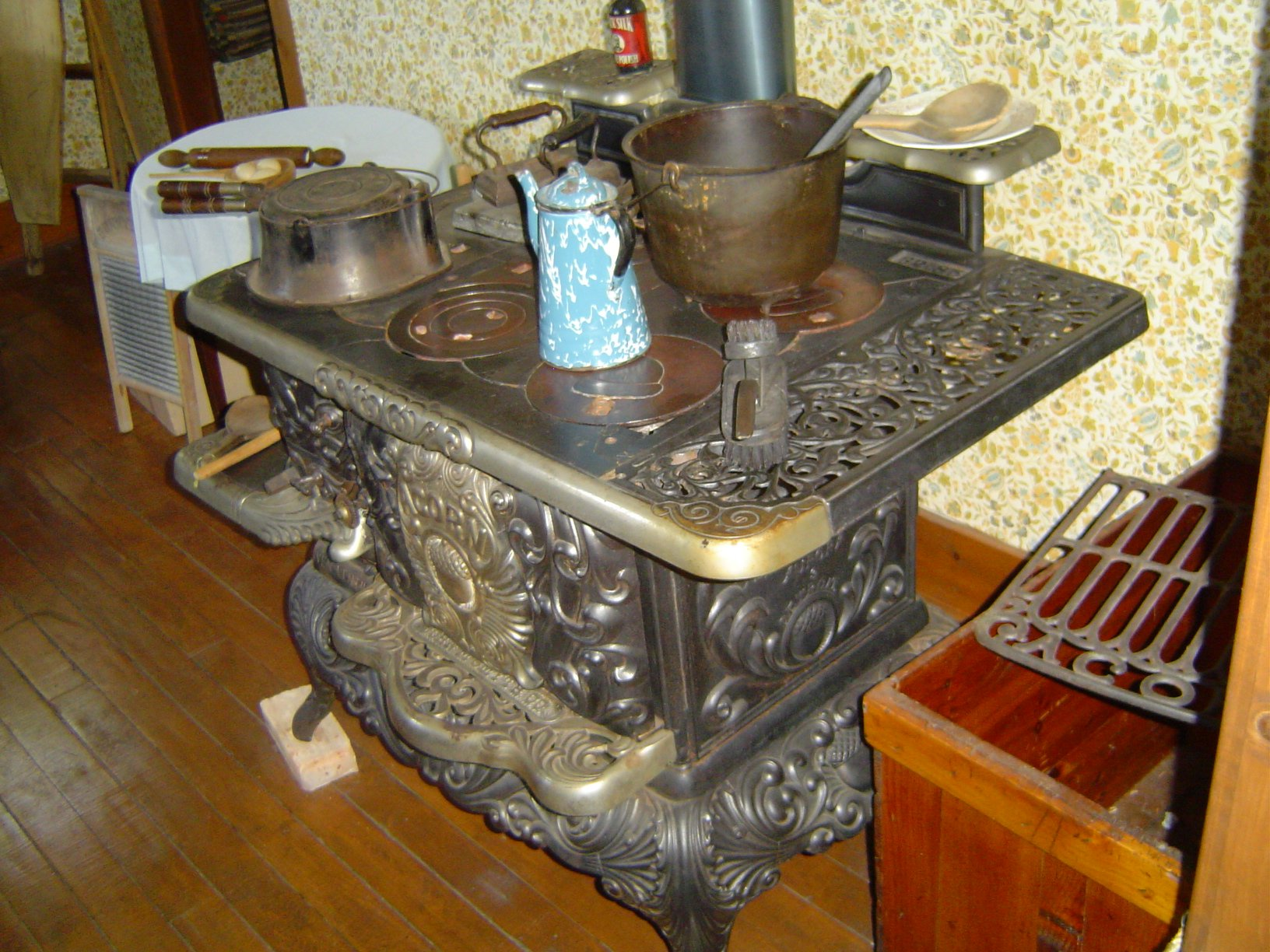
Kitchen
