= SS Pere Marquette =

Lake Michigan train ferry

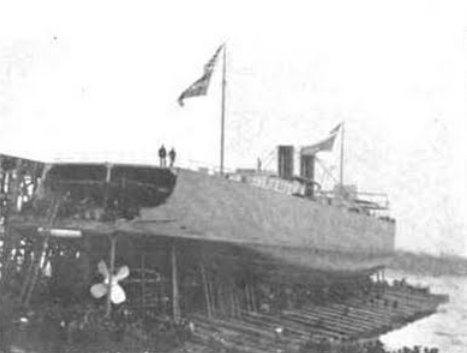
Pere Marquette carferry being launched in 1896

SS Pere Marquette (also Pere Marquette 15) was the world's first steel train ferry. It sailed on Lake Michigan and provided a service between the ports of Ludington, Michigan, and Manitowoc, Wisconsin, for the Pere Marquette Railway from 1897 to 1930. The railway used the name Pere Marquette for many of its ships and ferries, adding a number to the end of the name.

== Railroad car ferry ==
The carferry was built by the Wheeler Shipyards in Bay City, Michigan, in 1896 at a cost of $300,000. The vessel was built for the Flint and Pere Marquette Railroad and complete when launched, except for a few finishing items needed for the cabins. It left Bay City on December 30, 1896, and arrived first in Milwaukee, Wisconsin, for a day's public inspection. It then continued onto Ludington, Michigan, from there and arrived on January 13, 1897. The ship had split cabins, one in front of the smoke stacks and one behind them. They provided sleeping berths for the officers and ten passengers.

The steamship was 350 feet (110 m) long and 56 feet (17 m) wide. It measured 2,443 gross register tons and had two 12-foot (3.7 m) propellers to drive it. There were two compound engines that produced 2,500 horsepower (1,900 kW). The ship had electricity from stem to stern that was controlled at the pilot house. The inside deck had four railroad tracks with a capacity of 30 freight boxcars. Fully loaded the carferry had a displacement of some 4,050 tonnes (3,990 long tons) on a 12.25-foot (3.73 m) draft of water. The vessel traveled in both the summer and winter and was capable of handling severe gales. Its hull was constructed to break up heavy ice. The steamship was the first steel train ferry constructed in the world.

The vessel carried railroad cars and passengers and went into service as a cross-lake train ferry going across Lake Michigan. It made its official maiden voyage from Ludington to Manitowoc, Wisconsin, on the night of February 16, 1897. It carried 22 railroad freight boxcars and traveled all night at a speed of 14 knots (26 km/h; 16 mph) and arrived at its destination at 7:00 A.M. on February 17. On February 21 it struck and sank the fishing steamer T. W. Ferry docked at the Pere Marquette Railway Company dock in Ludington. The steamship was originally called the Pere Marquette and renamed the Pere Marquette No. 15 in 1924. She was scrapped in 1935.

The naval architect who designed the steamship was Robert Logan. He designed six car ferries for the Flint and Pere Marquette Railroad between 1895 and 1910. He was born in Scotland and started shipbuilding in Canada in 1888.

== See also ==
- Ships named Pere Marquette
- Ferries in Michigan
- Leviathan, built in 1849 and considered the first modern train ferry
- SS Badger
- SS Spartan
- SS John Sherman
- SS City of Midland 41
- SS City of Milwaukee
- William L. Mercereau, superintendent of the carferry steamship system out of Ludington, Michigan.
