= Ludington Light =

Lighthouse in Michigan, United States

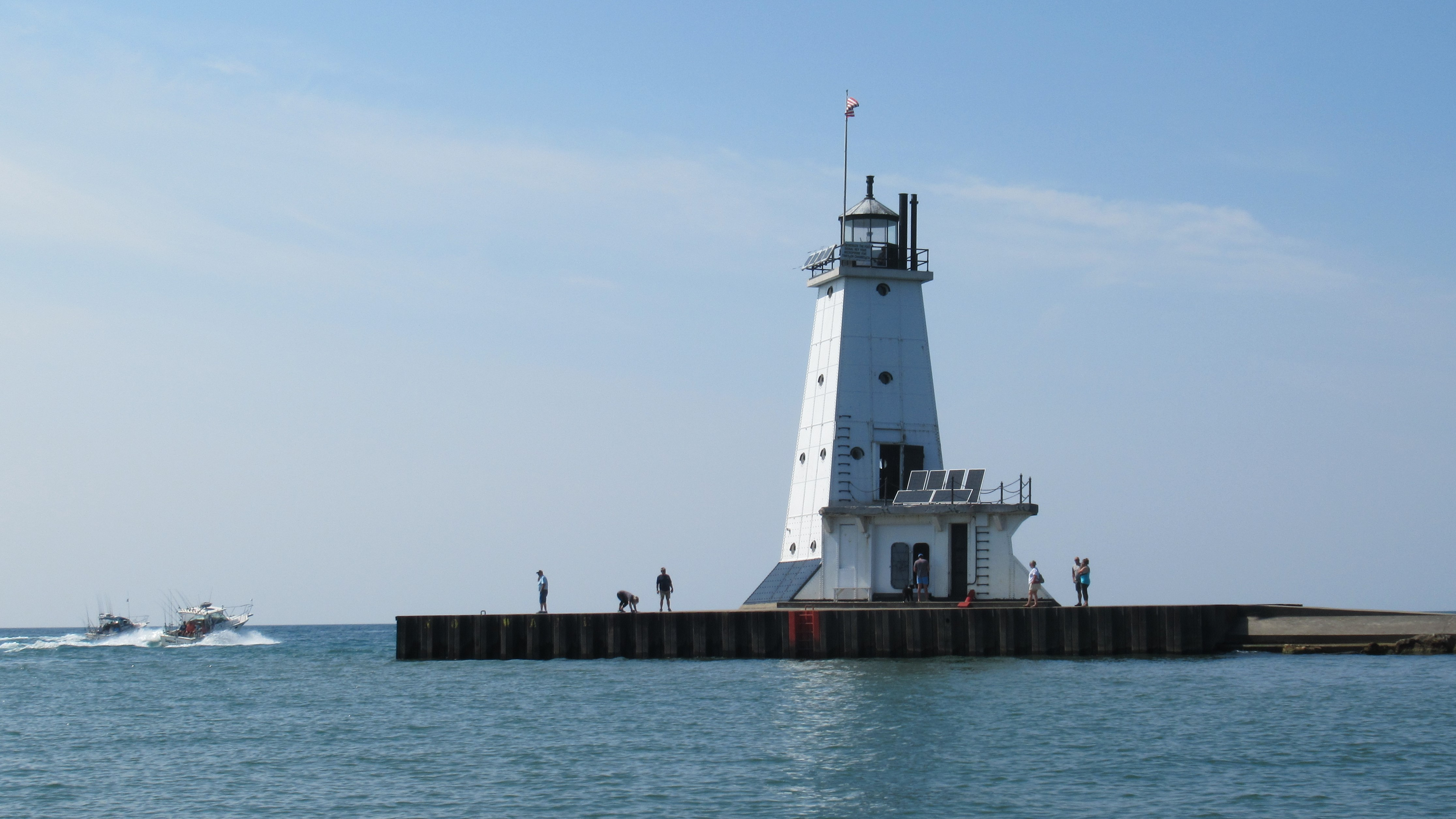
- Ludington Light in August 2023
- Location: Ludington, Michigan
- Coordinates: 43°57′13.002″N 86°28′9.737″W

Tower
- Constructed: 1871
- Foundation: Pier
- Construction: Steel / Reinforced concrete
- Automated: 1972
- Height: 57 feet (17 m)
- Shape: Square Pyramidal
- Markings: white with black lantern
- Heritage: National Register of Historic Places listed place
- Fog signal: HORN: 2 blasts ev 30s (2s bl-2s si-2s bl-24s si). Operates from Apr. 1 to Oct. 1.

Light
- First lit: 1871
- Deactivated: N/A
- Focal height: 55 feet (17 m)
- Lens: fifth order Fresnel Lens (original), 12-inch (300 mm) Tideland Signal ML-300 Acrylic Optic (current)
- Intensity: 5000 candles
- Range: 5 nautical miles (9.3 km; 5.8 mi)
- Characteristic: Iso G 6s 55
- Ludington North Breakwater Light
- U.S. National Register of Historic Places
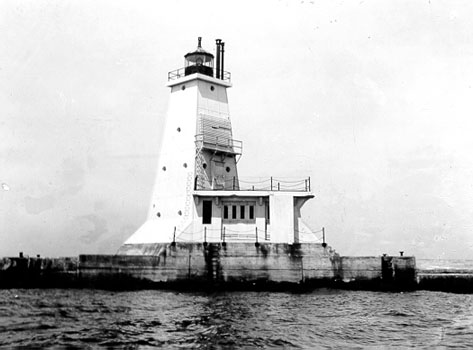
- Location: Ludington, Michigan
- Built: 1924
- NRHP reference No.: 05000982
- Added to NRHP: September 6, 2005

The Ludington Light is a 57-foot (17 m) tall steel-plated lighthouse in Ludington, Michigan, which lies along the eastern shores of Lake Michigan, at the end of the breakwater on the Pere Marquette Harbor. Given its location on the northern breakwater where the Pere Marquette River meets Lake Michigan, it is sometimes known as the Ludington North Breakwater Light. Underlying the building itself is a prow-like structure, which is designed to break waves.

== History ==
The station was established in 1871. This light was first lit in 1924, and it is presently operational. It was automated in 1972. The light is structurally integrated into the steel and reinforced concrete pier upon which it is built. It has a square pyramidal form, and is white with a black lantern. The original lens was a Fourth Order Fresnel lens. On October 17, 1995 the Fresnel lens was removed from the lantern. It was replaced by a 12-inch (300 mm) Tideland Signal ML-300 acrylic optic. The original lens was loaned to Historic White Pine Village where it is displayed as part of their maritime history exhibit.After the opening of the Port of Ludington Maritime Museum, the lens was relocated to their lighthouse history exhibit.

A fog signal building is integrated into the tower. It originally had a Type F Diaphone signal, and a FA-232 is now in operation. A radio beacon is also in place and operational.

In 2006, the Ludington Breakwater Lighthouse was opened to the public for the first time in its history. The Coast Guard transferred ownership to the City of Ludington under the terms of the National Historic Lighthouse Preservation Act. The lighthouse is being operated and maintained in partnership with the Sable Points Lighthouse Keepers Association, which is a volunteer group that maintains, restores and operates this light, the Big Sable Point Lighthouse and the Little Sable Point Lighthouse.

The lighthouse is open to the public during the summer season for climbing tours.

== See also ==
- Lighthouses in the United States
