= SS John Sherman =

American ship built in 1865

John Sherman
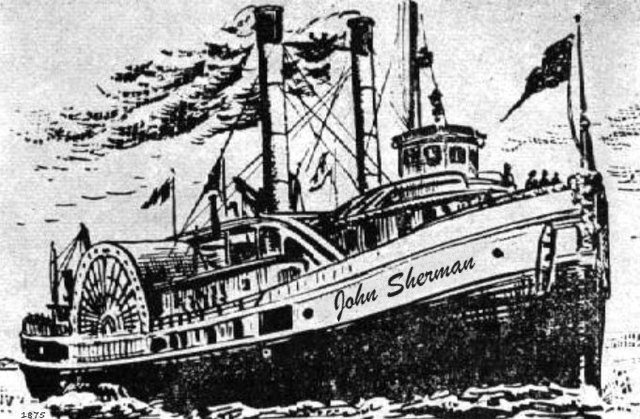
- John Sherman in merchant service

History
- Name: USRC John Sherman; John Sherman (1873)
- Namesake: John Sherman (US Secretary of State}
- Ordered: Feb 10, 1865
- Builder: Peck & Kirby (Cleveland, OH)
- Completed: 1866
- Commissioned: 1 May 1866 – 21 Oct 1871
- In service: 1866–1893
- Refit: —as passenger/cargo steamer, 1873; —as barge, 1878
- Fate: Scrapped 1893

General characteristics
- Type: Revenue cutter (1866); Passenger/cargo steamer (1873)
- Displacement: 500 tons
- Length: 172 ft (52 m)
- Beam: 27 ft 3 in (8.31 m)
- Draft: 10 ft 10 in (3.30 m)
- Installed power: 1 × cyl vertical beam
- Propulsion: Sidewheels

John Sherman, originally the United States Revenue Cutter Service cutter USRC John Sherman (or simply USRC Sherman), was built in 1865 before being disposed of by the United States Government in 1872. Initially deployed in government service on the Great Lakes of North America, she was sold in 1873 and used for ferry service across Lake Michigan between the states of Michigan and Wisconsin. In 1874 the ship was chartered by Flint and Pere Marquette Railroad to become the first steamer used by the company transporting freight and passengers. Converted to a barge in 1878, she was scrapped in 1893.

== Description ==
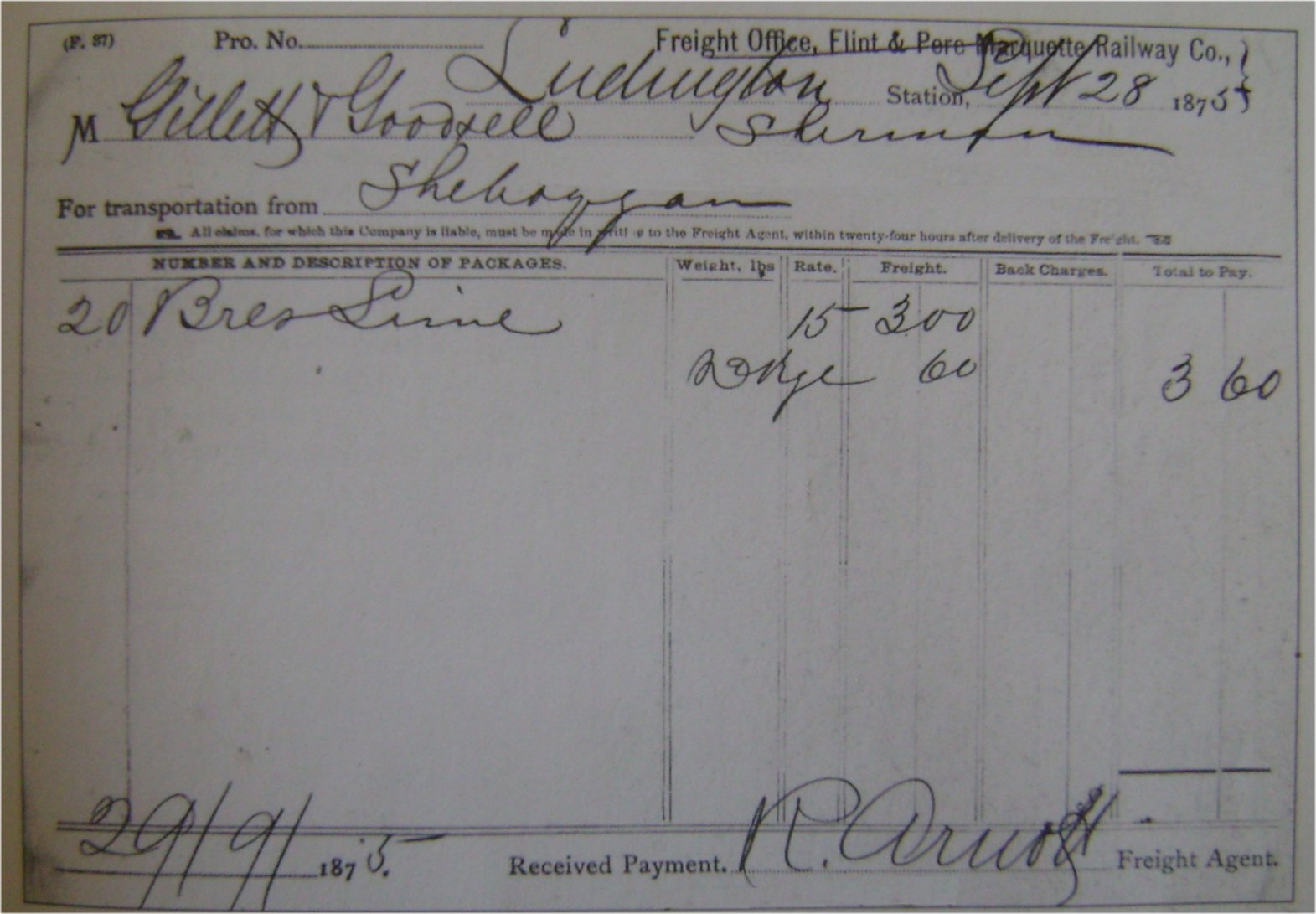
John Sherman 1875 ferry freight bill for shipping limes

The vessel was 175 feet (53 m) long by 28.5 feet (8.7 m) wide with a 11 feet (3.4 m) hold and propelled by 25 feet (7.6 m) diameter paddle wheels fitted with buckets with a 8 feet (2.4 m) face and a 25 inches (640 mm) dip and built in Cleveland, Ohio.

== History ==
On November 11, 1866, the schooner George Worthington (initially reported as the George Washington) was carrying iron ore ran into difficulties and went ashore at the mouth of Cleveland harbor with 2 of the 8 crew drowning in the process. The Sherman started pulling on the Worthington on November 12, hauling her off on November 15, and towing her into port.

On November 7, 1867, the Sherman refloated the schooner J. F. Prince after she had been driven ashore near the water works in Cleveland on the previous day. The Prince was then towed into port by the tug Levi Johnson.

Around June 23, 1871, the Canadian schooner Denmark ran aground on the shore of Lake Eire at Rond Eau or Rondeau in Ontario, Canada. After several days of unsuccessful attempts to refloat the Denmark, the Sherman steamed to the location and the Denmark was refloated and under way again shortly afterwards. The owners of the Denmark offered payment which was declined, after which they sent a letter to the newspapers praising the work of the Sherman.

USRC John Sherman was sold to a private buyer in Cleveland on June 25, 1872. In July the vessel, now known plainly as John Sherman, was slightly damaged when she went ashore at Bois Blanc on the Detroit River in Ontario, Canada. Then in October she suffered an engine failure whilst sailing on Lake Michigan and needed to be towed to Chicago. After this she was refitted. In 1873 she was then sold to a group of people including D. Cole by the company River & Lake Shore for $18,357.

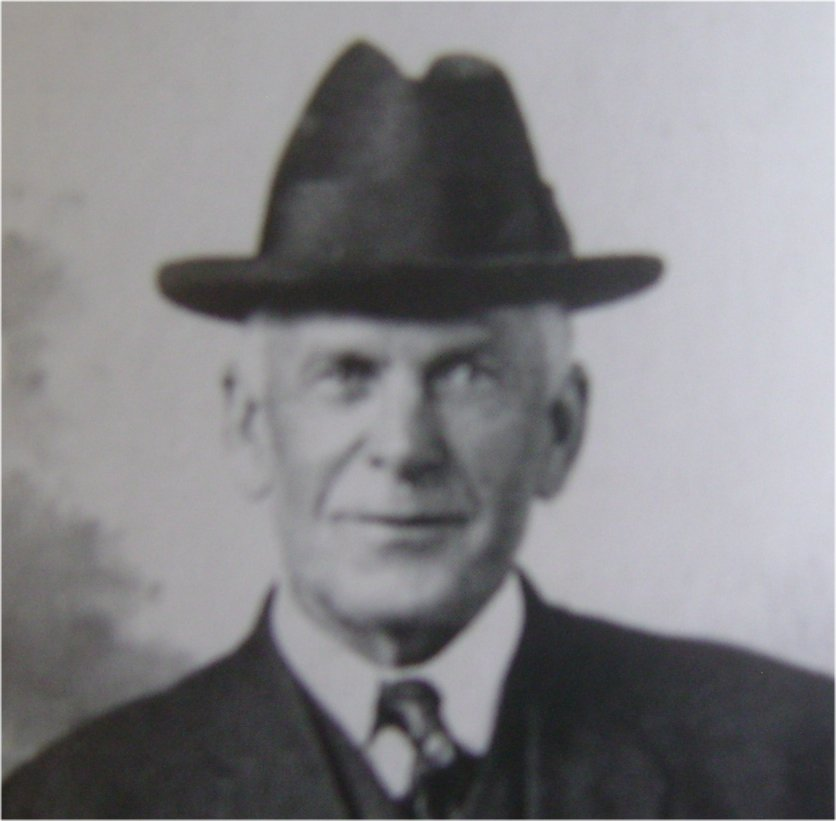
John W. Steward, the ship commander, circa 1901

The John Sherman had already started a ferry service across Lake Michigan in 1873 when the Flint and Pere Marquette Railroad hired the cross-lake ferry service from Ludington, Michigan to Sheboygan, Wisconsin, on June 25, 1874. They then initiated a public commercial package freight service across Lake Michigan on May 31, 1875. She shuttled packaged freight, grain, and people across Lake Michigan between Ludington and Sheboygan, Wisconsin under the command of Captain John W. Steward.

After the one season in 1875 the vessel was found to be too small for the volume of freight on the route and was discontinued. The craft was then rebuilt in 1877 as a passenger steamer operating out of Detroit.

In 1878 the Sherman was sold to J.P. Clark and W.O. Ashley of Detroit who removed the engines to be used in the boat Alaska, then in 1890 boat Frank E. Kirby, and turned the Sherman into a barge to carry lumber before being scrapped in 1893.

== Sources ==
- Ludington's Carferries: The Rise, Decline & Rebirth of a Great Lakes Fleet, 1874-1997. Ludington Daily News. 1997. OCLC 38735177.
- Frederickson, Arthur C. & Lucy F. (1955). C & O train and auto ferries. Printed by the Lakeside Print. Co. OCLC 10904099.
- Inland Seas. Great Lakes Historical Society. 1949. OCLC 937947524.
- Hilton, George Woodman (December 2003) [1962]. The Great Lakes Car Ferries. Davenport, Iowa: Montevallo Historical Press, Inc. ISBN 978-0-9658624-3-1. OCLC 61225777.
