= Warren A. and Catherine Cartier House =

Historic house in Michigan, United States

- U.S. National Register of Historic Places
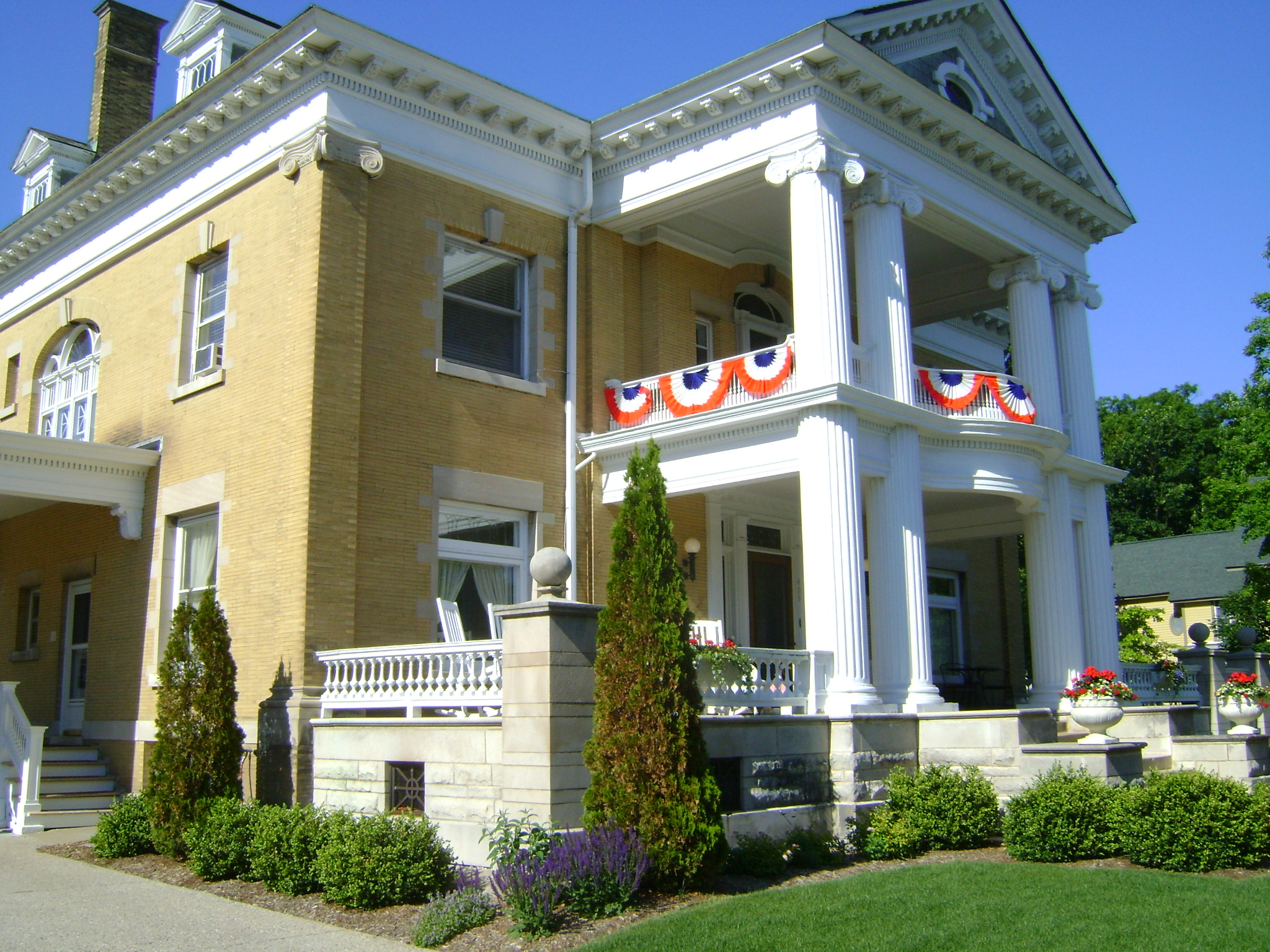
- Interactive map
- Location: 409 E. Ludington Ave. Ludington, Michigan
- Coordinates: 43°57′21″N 86°26′33″W
- Built: 1905
- Architectural style: Neoclassical
- NRHP reference No.: 14001007
- Added to NRHP: December 10, 2014

The Warren A. and Catherine Cartier House (sometimes erroneously referred to as the William A. and Catherine Cartier House) was constructed as a single family house located at 409 East Ludington Avenue in Ludington, Michigan. It was listed on the National Register of Historic Places in 2014, and as of 2023 operates as the Cartier Mansion Bed and Breakfast.

== Warren A. Cartier ==
Warren Antoine Cartier was born in Manistee, Michigan, on January 12, 1866. His family moved to Ludington in 1878. He graduated from the University of Notre Dame in 1887 and joined his father's lumber business. In 1888 he married Catherine (Kate) Dempsey. He founded and led a number of businesses in Ludington, and was elected mayor in 1899 and 1903. Cartier died of a heart attack in 1934.

== House history ==
In 1905, Cartier designed and built this home on Ludington Avenue, located directly opposite his father's house. The Cartier family sold the house to Abbie and Genevieve Schoenberger in 1950. In 2005, the Schoenberger family sold the house to Gary and Sue Ann Schnitker, who operated the house as the Cartier Mansion Bed and Breakfast. In 2020, Chris and Jenna Simpler purchased Cartier Mansion and have undertaken several renovations and upgrades, including the build-out of the Carriage House into four luxury suites.

== Description ==
This house is a three-story neoclassical mansion, constructed of Roman pressed brick and trimmed with Bedford limestone. When constructed, it contained a number of modern conveniences, including a steam heating system, a pulley-operated draft system to provide cooling, and chandeliers lit by both gas and electricity. The main floor contains a tiled anteroom, a library, a kitchen with butler's pantry, a music room and a living room. A broad, sweeping staircase leads to the second floor, containing bedrooms for Warren and Kate Cartier and their children. The third floor contains a darkroom and gymnasium. The interior is finished throughout with mahogany, cherry, walnut, white maple, oak, and hickory.
