= Mason County Historical Society =

Historical society in Ludington, Michigan, USA

Mason County Historical Society - White Pine Village - Port of Ludington Maritime Museum
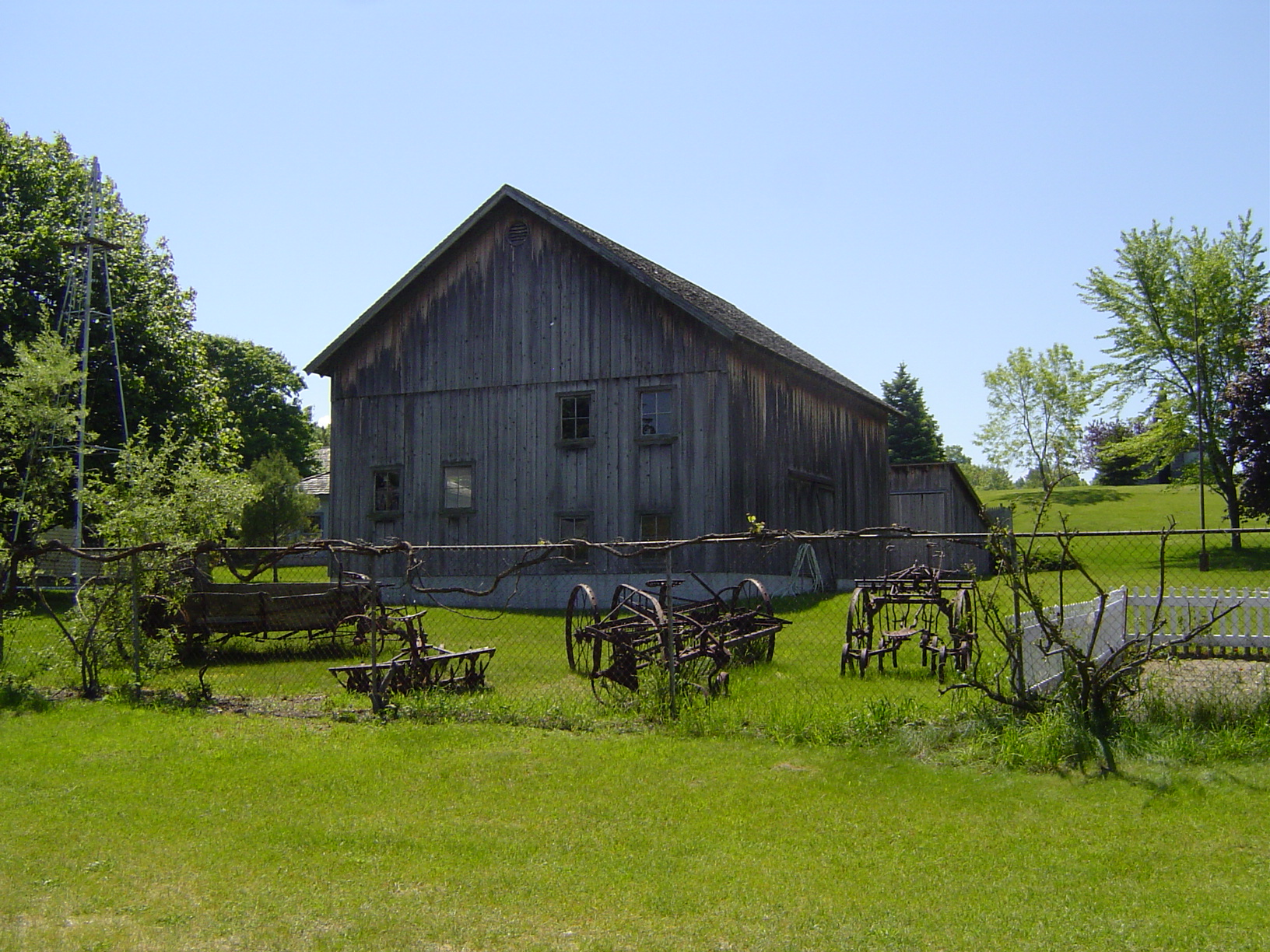
- White Pine Village farming equipment
- Established: 30 November 1937
- Location: 130 E Ludington Avenue, Ludington, Michigan
- Coordinates: 43°55′38″N 86°26′43″W
- Executive director: Rebecca Berringer
- Website: masoncountymihistory.org}

Mason County Historical Society, located in Ludington, Michigan, is a private, non-profit, educational organization. It operates the Mason County Research Center, the Port of Ludington Maritime Museum, and the White Pine Village, a living history museum, showcasing nineteenth-century history. The historical society hosts the Mason County Sports Hall of Fame and the Scottville Clown Band Collection, and maintains the Ludington Murals and the Pere Marquette Memorial Cross.

== History and organization ==
The Society was formally organized at the Mason County Courthouse on November 30, 1937, by 40 people. For many years, the Society lacked a permanent building; early displays were placed in various public buildings around Ludington, such as the City Center Building and the Ludington Public Library. In 1951, space was provided in a church basement, and in 1961, the Society acquired its own building at 305 E. Filer St., which served as both collection storage and display area. The organization formally incorporated on May 15, 1957. In the late 1960s, the Society secured the Burr Caswell house, ’s oldest house, on the Buttersville Peninsula, which later became part of what was known as Pioneer Village, renamed Historic White Pine Village in 1976.

== Museums and facilities ==
The Mason County Historical Society manages several sites related to regional history including:

=== Historic White Pine Village ===
There are thirty historic buildings in the vicinity of the museum, these include the Mason County Courthouse built in 1849 and a steam locomotive. The Village highlights life in Mason County during the late 19th and early 20th centuries, focusing on pioneer life, lumbering, and agriculture. Exhibits contain artifacts and archives related to the county's development.

=== Port of Ludington Maritime Museum ===
The Society also operates the Port of Ludington Maritime Museum, located in a former U.S. Coast Guard Station listed on the National Register of Historic Places. Exhibits cover local maritime history, including shipwrecks, car ferries, and lighthouse technology. The museum uses digital storytelling, authentic artifacts, and interactive exhibits.

=== Research Center ===
The Mason County Research Center supports historical and genealogical research. It serves as a resource for the study and preservation of West Michigan and Mason County history. Research appointments are scheduled in advance.

== See also ==
- List of historical societies in Michigan
