= Luddington =

Luddington may refer to:

== Places ==
- Luddington, Lincolnshire, England
- Luddington-in-the-Brook, Northamptonshire, England
- Luddington, Warwickshire, England

== People ==
- Camilla Luddington, British-American actress
- David Luddington, British novelist and humorist
- Sir Donald Luddington (1920–2009), British colonial government official and civil servant
- Elam Luddington (1806–1893), the first missionary of The Church of Jesus Christ of Latter-day Saints to preach in Thailand
- Henry Luddington (1854–1922), English cricketer
- William Luddington (1843–1888), Primitive Methodist missionary

== Other ==
- Luddington railway station, Lincolnshire
