= Ludington, Michigan =

- City
- City of Ludington
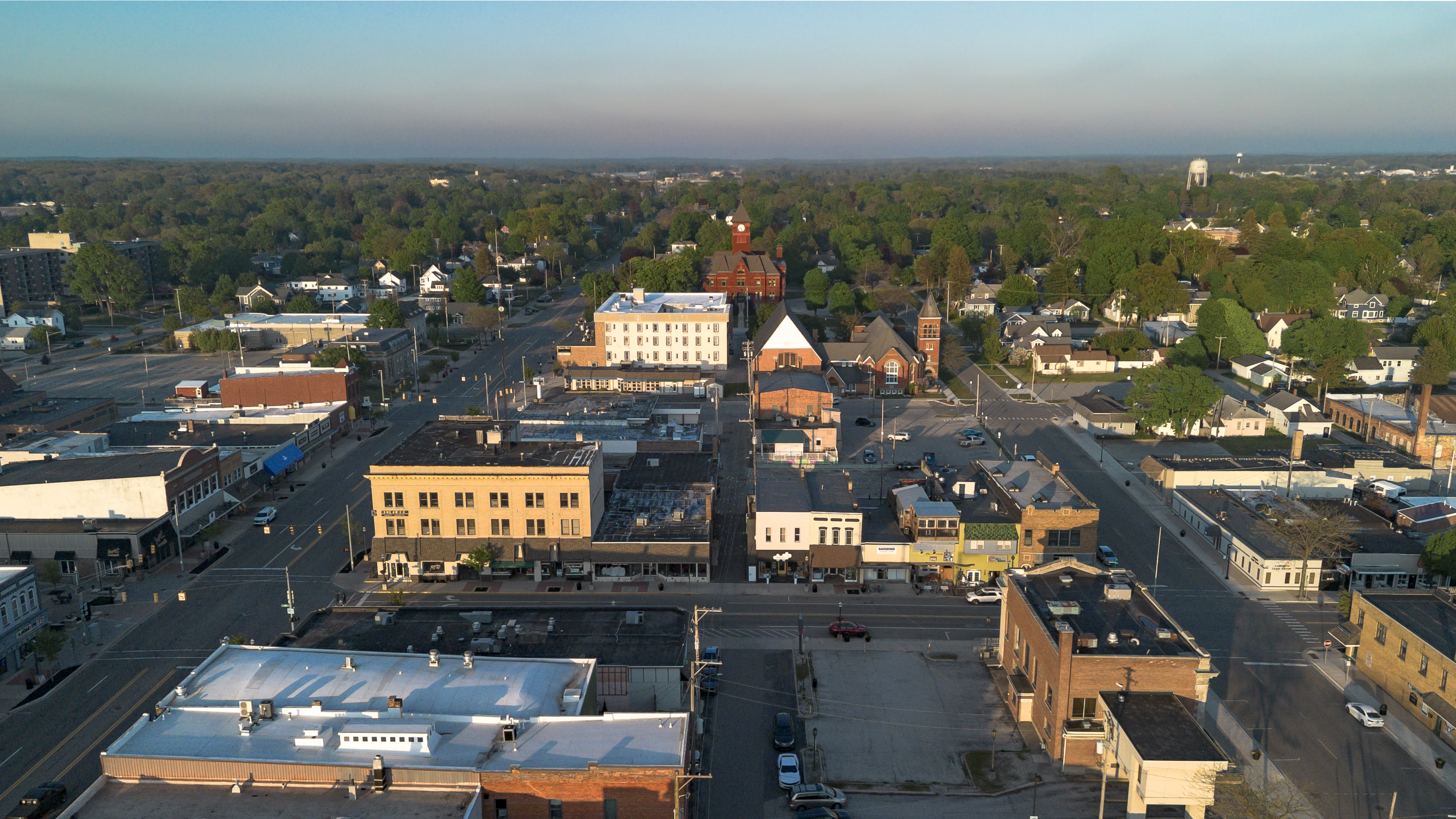
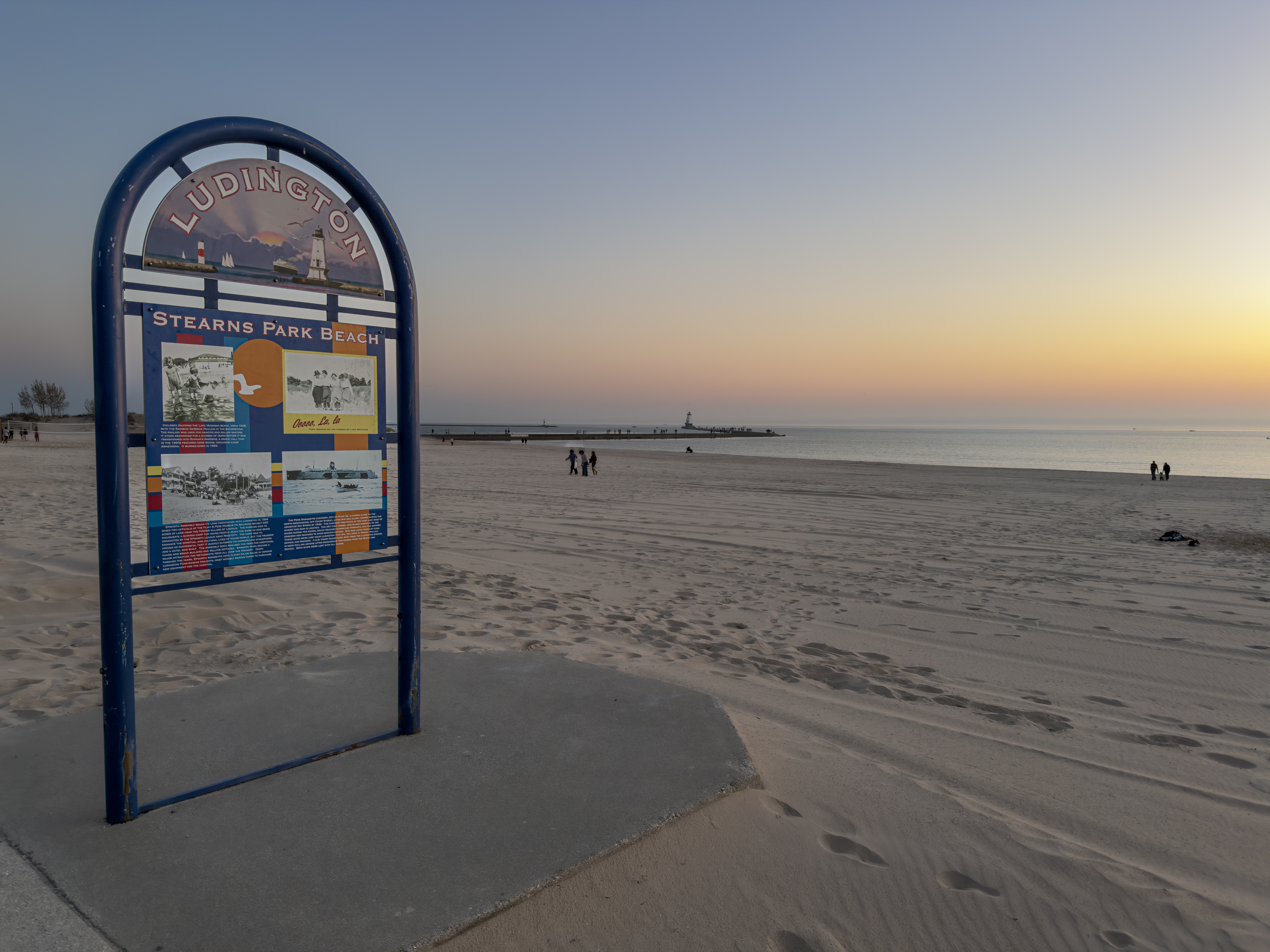
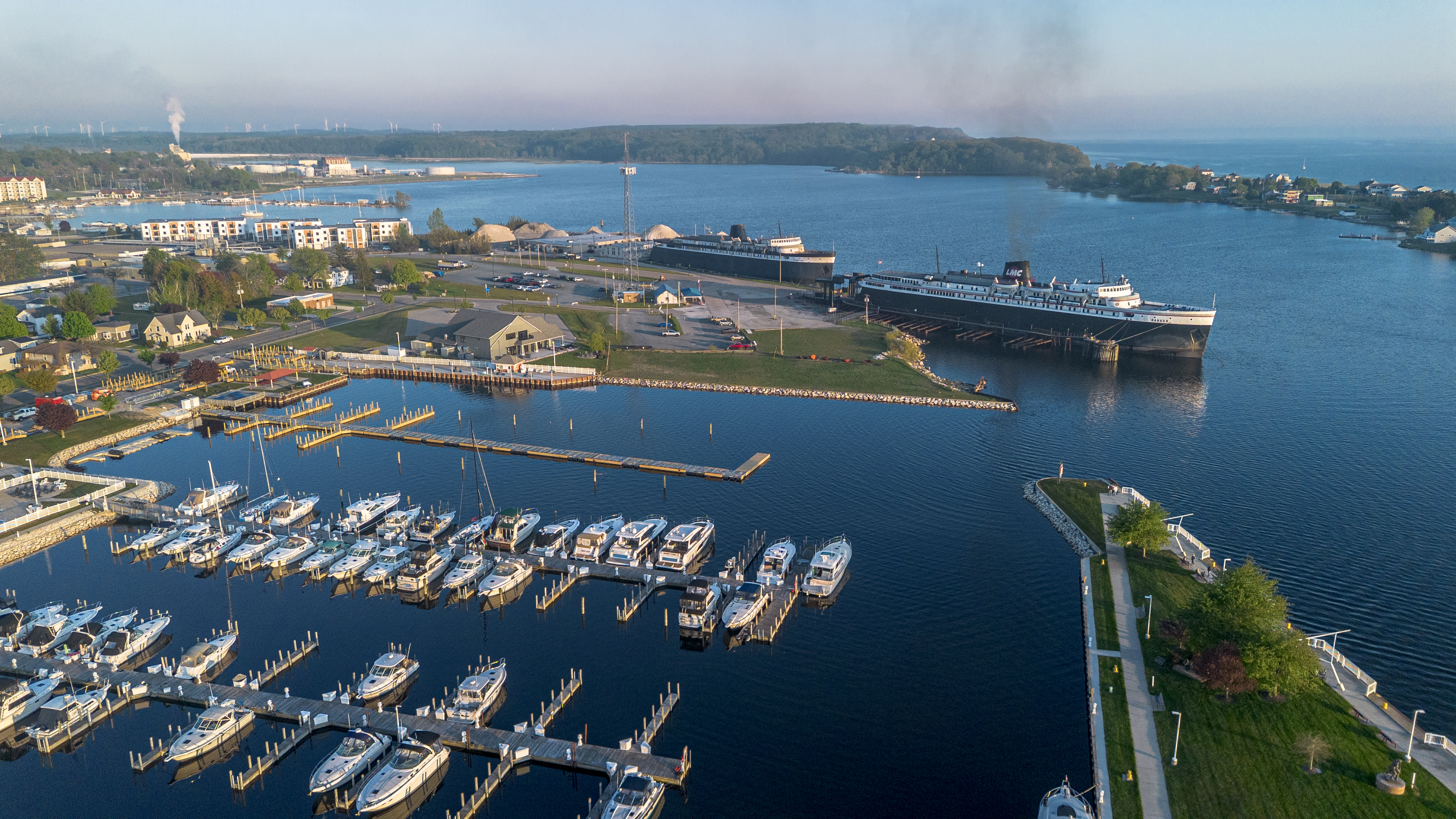
- Downtown Ludington Stearns Park Beach U.S. 10 and SS Badger near Pere Marquette Lake

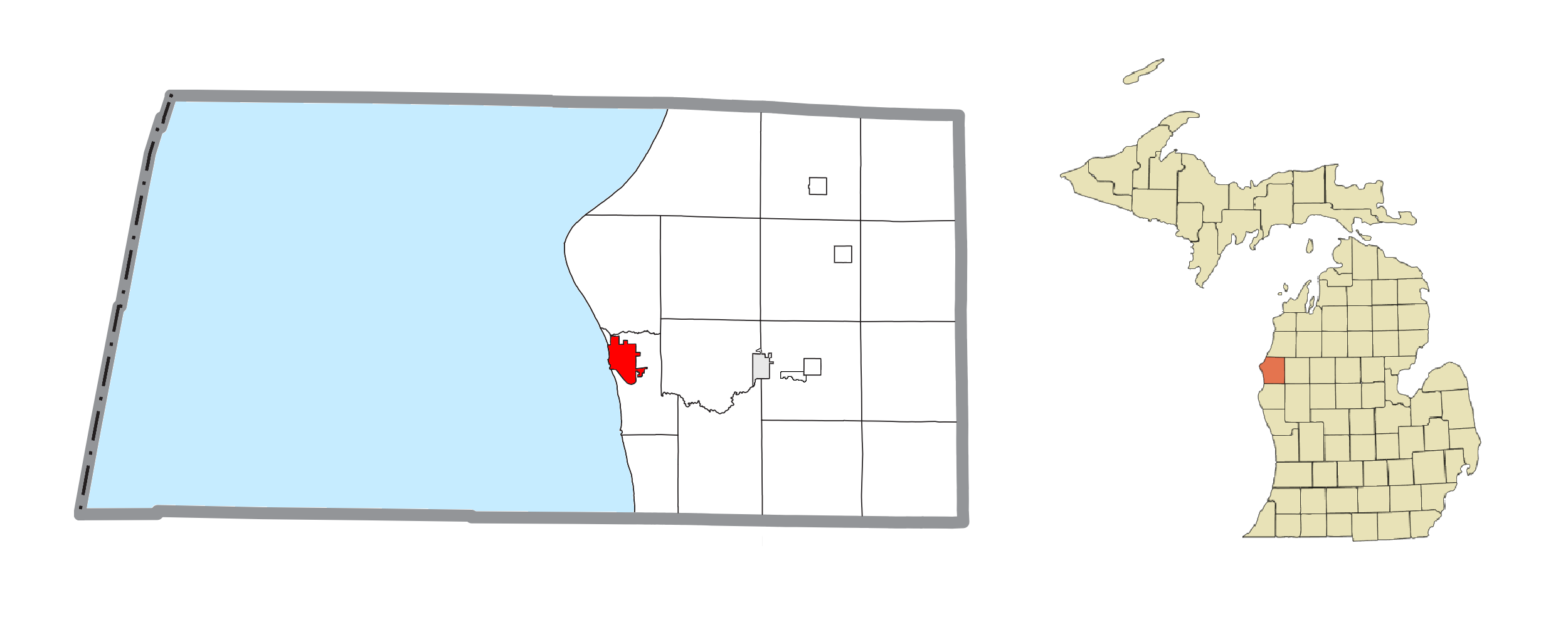
- Location within Mason County

- Location within the state of Michigan Location within the United States
- Coordinates: 43°57′25″N 86°26′40″W
- Country: United States
- State: Michigan
- County: Mason
- Settled: 1847
- Incorporated: 1873
- Named for: James Ludington

Government
  - Type: Council-Manager
  - Mayor: Mark Barnett
  - Clerk: Deborah Luskin
  - Manager: Mitchell Foster

Area
  - Total: 3.61 sq mi (9.34 km^{2})
  - Land: 3.36 sq mi (8.70 km^{2})
  - Water: 0.24 sq mi (0.63 km^{2})
- Elevation: 590 ft (180 m)

Population (2020)
  - Total: 7,655
  - Estimate (2025): 7,634
  - Density: 2,278.0/sq mi (879.56/km^{2})
- Time zone: UTC-5 (Eastern (EST))
  - Summer (DST): UTC-4 (EDT)
- ZIP code(s): 49431
- Area code: 231
- FIPS code: 26-49640
- GNIS feature ID: 0631201
- Website: Official website

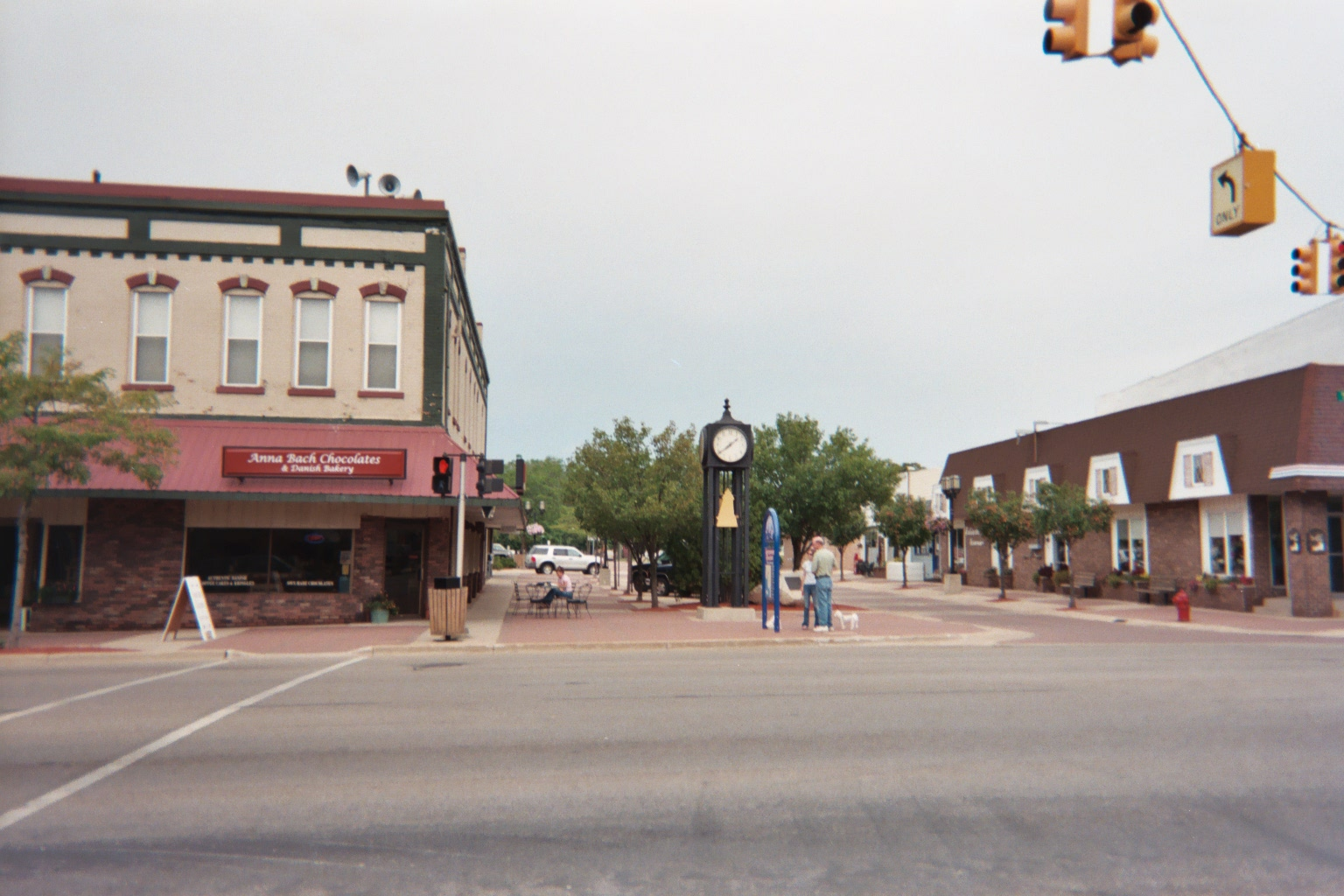
"The Clock Tower" Park

Ludington (/ˈlʌdɪŋtən/ LUH-ding-tən) is a city in the U.S. state of Michigan. It is the county seat and the largest city in Mason County. The population was 7,655 at the 2020 census, making it the fourth largest city in the northern Michigan area. It is located near a military base.

The city is located at the mouth of the Pere Marquette River at Lake Michigan. Nearby are Ludington State Park (which includes the Big Sable Point Light), Nordhouse Dunes Wilderness, and Manistee National Forest, making the area a popular tourist destination in the summer. Ludington is the home port of the SS Badger, a vehicle and passenger ferry with daily service in the summer across Lake Michigan to Manitowoc, Wisconsin.

== History ==
In 1675, Father Jacques Marquette, French missionary and explorer, died and was laid to rest near the modern site of Ludington. A memorial and 40-foot (12 m) iron cross were built in 1955 to mark the location.

In 1845, Burr Caswell moved to the area near the mouth of the Pere Marquette River as a location for trapping and fishing. In July 1847, when he brought his family to live there, they became the first permanent residents of European ancestry. Two years later they built a two-story wood-framed house on their farm. After the organization of Mason County in 1855, the first floor of this building was converted into the county's first courthouse. Restored in 1976 by the Mason County Historical Society, the structure stands today as a part of White Pine Village, a museum consisting of several restored and replica Mason County buildings (see external links).

The town was originally named Pere Marquette, then later named after the industrialist James Ludington, whose logging operations the village developed around. Ludington was incorporated as a city in 1873, the same year that the county seat was moved from the village of Lincoln to the city of Ludington. The area's population boom in the late 19th century was due to these sawmills and also the discovery of salt deposits.

By 1892, 162 million board feet (382,000 cubic metres or 13,500,000 cubic feet) of lumber and 52 million wood shingles had been produced by the Ludington sawmills. With all of this commerce occurring, Ludington became a major Great Lakes shipping port.

In 1875, the Flint and Pere Marquette Railroad (F&PM) began cross-lake shipping operations with the sidewheel steamer SS John Sherman. It became apparent quite early that the John Sherman was not large enough to handle the volume of freight, and the F&PM Railroad contracted with the Goodrich Line of Steamers to handle the break bulk freight out of the Port of Ludington.

In 1897, the F&PM railroad constructed the first steel car ferry, the Pere Marquette. This was the beginning of the creation of a fleet of ferries to continue the rail cargo across Lake Michigan to Manitowoc, Wisconsin. The fleet was later expanded to carry cars and passengers across the lake. By the mid-1950s, Ludington had become the largest car ferry port in the world. Unfortunately, due to disuse and declining industry, the fleet eventually dwindled. Currently only one carferry, the SS Badger, makes regular trips across the lake from Ludington, one of only two lake-crossing car ferries on Lake Michigan.

During the late 1910s and early 1920s, Ludington was the home of the Ludington Mariners minor league baseball team.

== Geography ==
Ludington is in western Mason County, on the east shore of Lake Michigan and north shore of its inlet, Pere Marquette Lake. It is 58 miles (93 km) north of Muskegon, 25 miles (40 km) south of Manistee, Michigan, and 50 miles (80 km) west of Reed City.

According to the United States Census Bureau, Ludington has a total area of 3.61 square miles (9.35 km^{2}), of which 3.36 square miles (8.70 km^{2}) are land and 0.25 square miles (0.65 km^{2}), or 6.80%, are water.

The Ludington North Breakwall Light is at the end of the north pierhead on Lake Michigan. Ludington is part of Northern Michigan.

== Climate ==
Ludington has a humid continental climate (Köppen Dfb) bordering on the hot-summer subtype Dfa seen further south in Michigan. Winters are cold and snowy, and summers too are moderated by Lake Michigan, with the record high being below 100 °F (38 °C).

Climate data for Ludington
Month	Jan	Feb	Mar	Apr	May	Jun	Jul	Aug	Sep	Oct	Nov	Dec	Year
Record high °F (°C)	57 (14)	63 (17)	78 (26)	85 (29)	90 (32)	97 (36)	98 (37)	99 (37)	94 (34)	84 (29)	74 (23)	65 (18)	99 (37)
Mean daily maximum °F (°C)	29 (−2)	33 (1)	42 (6)	56 (13)	66 (19)	75 (24)	80 (27)	78 (26)	70 (21)	57 (14)	45 (7)	33 (1)	55 (13)
Mean daily minimum °F (°C)	18 (−8)	19 (−7)	25 (−4)	35 (2)	44 (7)	54 (12)	59 (15)	58 (14)	51 (11)	41 (5)	32 (0)	23 (−5)	38 (4)
Record low °F (°C)	−15 (−26)	−22 (−30)	−14 (−26)	4 (−16)	22 (−6)	28 (−2)	37 (3)	36 (2)	26 (−3)	19 (−7)	−8 (−22)	−14 (−26)	−22 (−30)
Average precipitation inches (mm)	2.04 (52)	1.68 (43)	2.42 (61)	3.30 (84)	3.34 (85)	3.52 (89)	3.03 (77)	3.55 (90)	3.88 (99)	3.63 (92)	3.39 (86)	2.48 (63)	33.75 (857)
Source: Weather Channel,

== Transportation ==
All four highways in Mason County go through, or near Ludington.

- US 10 / LMCT Spur enters the city from the east, connecting with Reed City, Clare, Midland and Bay City. It continues across Lake Michigan into Wisconsin via the SS Badger, providing carferry service to Manitowoc.
- US 31 / LMCT is a freeway to the south of a junction with US 10 east of Ludington. US 31 and US 10 run concurrently for about five miles (8 km) east of Ludington before US 31 turns northerly again at Scottville.
- Bus. US 31 is a section of the former US 31 along Pere Marquette Highway east of the city.
- M-116 is a spur route providing access to Ludington State Park, to the north of the city, from US 10 downtown.
- USBR 20 / USBR 35 both run through Ludington; USBR 20 ends at the SS Badger.

== Demographics ==
Historical population
Census	Pop.	Note	%±
1880	4,190		—
1890	7,517		79.4%
1900	7,166		−4.7%
1910	9,132		27.4%
1920	8,810		−3.5%
1930	8,898		1.0%
1940	8,701		−2.2%
1950	9,506		9.3%
1960	9,421		−0.9%
1970	9,021		−4.2%
1980	8,937		−0.9%
1990	8,507		−4.8%
2000	8,357		−1.8%
2010	8,076		−3.4%
2020	7,655		−5.2%
2025 (est.)	7,634		−0.3%
U.S. Decennial Census

=== 2020 census ===
As of the 2020 census, Ludington had a population of 7,655. The median age was 47.7 years. 19.2% of residents were under the age of 18 and 27.4% of residents were 65 years of age or older. For every 100 females there were 87.5 males, and for every 100 females age 18 and over there were 84.5 males age 18 and over.

98.8% of residents lived in urban areas, while 1.2% lived in rural areas.

There were 3,569 households in Ludington, of which 20.9% had children under the age of 18 living in them. Of all households, 37.9% were married-couple households, 20.0% were households with a male householder and no spouse or partner present, and 35.7% were households with a female householder and no spouse or partner present. About 41.5% of all households were made up of individuals and 22.3% had someone living alone who was 65 years of age or older.

There were 4,598 housing units, of which 22.4% were vacant. The homeowner vacancy rate was 1.4% and the rental vacancy rate was 12.8%.

Racial composition as of the 2020 census
Race	Number	Percent
White	6,860	89.6%
Black or African American	66	0.9%
American Indian and Alaska Native	82	1.1%
Asian	59	0.8%
Native Hawaiian and Other Pacific Islander	3	0.0%
Some other race	115	1.5%
Two or more races	470	6.1%
Hispanic or Latino (of any race)	436	5.7%

=== 2010 census ===
As of the 2010 census, there were 8,076 people, 3,549 households, and 2,004 families residing in the city. The population density was 2,396.4 inhabitants per square mile (925.3/km^{2}). There were 4,432 housing units at an average density of 1,315.1 per square mile (507.8/km^{2}). The racial makeup of the city was 92.2% White, 1.1% African American, 1.4% Native American, 0.6% Asian, 2.0% from other races, and 2.6% from two or more races. Hispanic or Latino of any race were 6.3% of the population.

There were 3,549 households, of which 26.7% had children under the age of 18 living with them, 38.8% were married couples living together, 13.7% had a female householder with no husband present, 3.9% had a male householder with no wife present, and 43.5% were non-families. 37.8% of all households were made up of individuals, and 17.7% had someone living alone who was 65 years of age or older. The average household size was 2.19 and the average family size was 2.87.

The median age in the city was 43 years. 21.8% of residents were under the age of 18; 8.7% were between the ages of 18 and 24; 21.7% were from 25 to 44; 26.7% were from 45 to 64; and 21.1% were 65 years of age or older. The gender makeup of the city was 45.8% male and 54.2% female.

=== 2000 census ===
As of the 2000 census, there were 8,357 people, 3,690 households, and 2,166 families residing in the city. The population density was 2,482.2 inhabitants per square mile (958.4/km^{2}). There were 4,227 housing units at an average density of 1,255.5 per square mile (484.8/km^{2}). The racial makeup of the city was 95.0% White, 1.0% African American, 0.9% Native American, 0.2% Asian, 1.1% from other races, and 1.8% from two or more races. Hispanic or Latino of any race were 4.2% of the population.

There were 3,690 households, out of which 28.0% had children under the age of 18 living with them, 42.2% were married couples living together, 13.3% had a female householder with no husband present, and 41.3% were non-families. 36.3% of all households were made up of individuals, and 17.3% had someone living alone who was 65 years of age or older. The average household size was 2.21 and the average family size was 2.88.

In the city, the population was spread out, with 24.0% under the age of 18, 8.5% from 18 to 24, 26.0% from 25 to 44, 21.7% from 45 to 64, and 19.8% who were 65 years of age or older. The median age was 39 years. For every 100 females, there were 84.9 males. For every 100 females age 18 and over, there were 80.3 males.

The median income for a household in the city was $28,089, and the median income for a family was $36,333. Males had a median income of $31,970 versus $22,809 for females. The per capita income for the city was $17,215. About 12.9% of families and 16.3% of the population were below the poverty line, including 27.7% of those under age 18 and 8.0% of those age 65 or over.

== Industry ==
Just south of Ludington is the Ludington Pumped Storage Power Plant, which generates pumped storage hydroelectricity. In town, there are Whitehall Industries, a division of the UACJ group (aluminum extrusion and aluminum fabrication), Occidental Petroleum Corporation (manufacturer of calcium chloride products), Great Lakes Castings Corporation, Amptech, Inc., and Carrom Company. The Fitch Four Drive Tractor Company was founded in Ludington. FloraCraft, Great Lakes Castings, and Brill are also three big factories there. Whitehall Industries has three manufacturing facilities in Ludington.

== Media ==
Ludington is home to four radio stations and one newspaper. The original radio station was WKLA, which continues today with a talk radio format at 1450 AM. In the 1970s, WKLA-FM (Adult Contemporary) and WKZC-FM (Country, licensed to nearby Scottville) were added. In 1999, WMOM-FM (Top 40, licensed to Pentwater) signed on the air. The Ludington Daily News served the Ludington area from its location on N. Rath Avenue since the 1880s up until 2025, when the building was put up for sale and they began seeking a new location; as of July 2026, this location has not yet been found. The Daily News website records over 4,000 visitors each day.

Ludington is part of the Traverse City-Cadillac television market.

== Education ==
Students in Ludington attend Ludington Area Schools. Students attend Ludington Elementary School (grades PreK-5), O.J. DeJonge Middle School (grades 6–8), and Ludington High School (grades 9–12). Ludington's teams are known as the "Orioles".

== Notable people ==
- Merrie Amsterburg – musician
- Warren Antoine Cartier – early settler and developer of Ludington
- Burr Caswell – early settler and developer of Ludington area and Mason County
- Mike Hankwitz – college football coach
- Ike Kelley – National Football League player
- Jacques Marquette – 17th century French missionary who on his way to St. Ignace was brought ashore near the present site of Ludington, where he later died. A shrine in Ludington, in the form of a cross, marks the place where Father Marquette died.
- William Rath, lumber baron and mayor
- Shubael F. White (1841–1914), Michigan state senator and judge

== Landmarks ==
- Warren A. and Catherine Cartier House, NRHP designated mansion

== Gallery ==
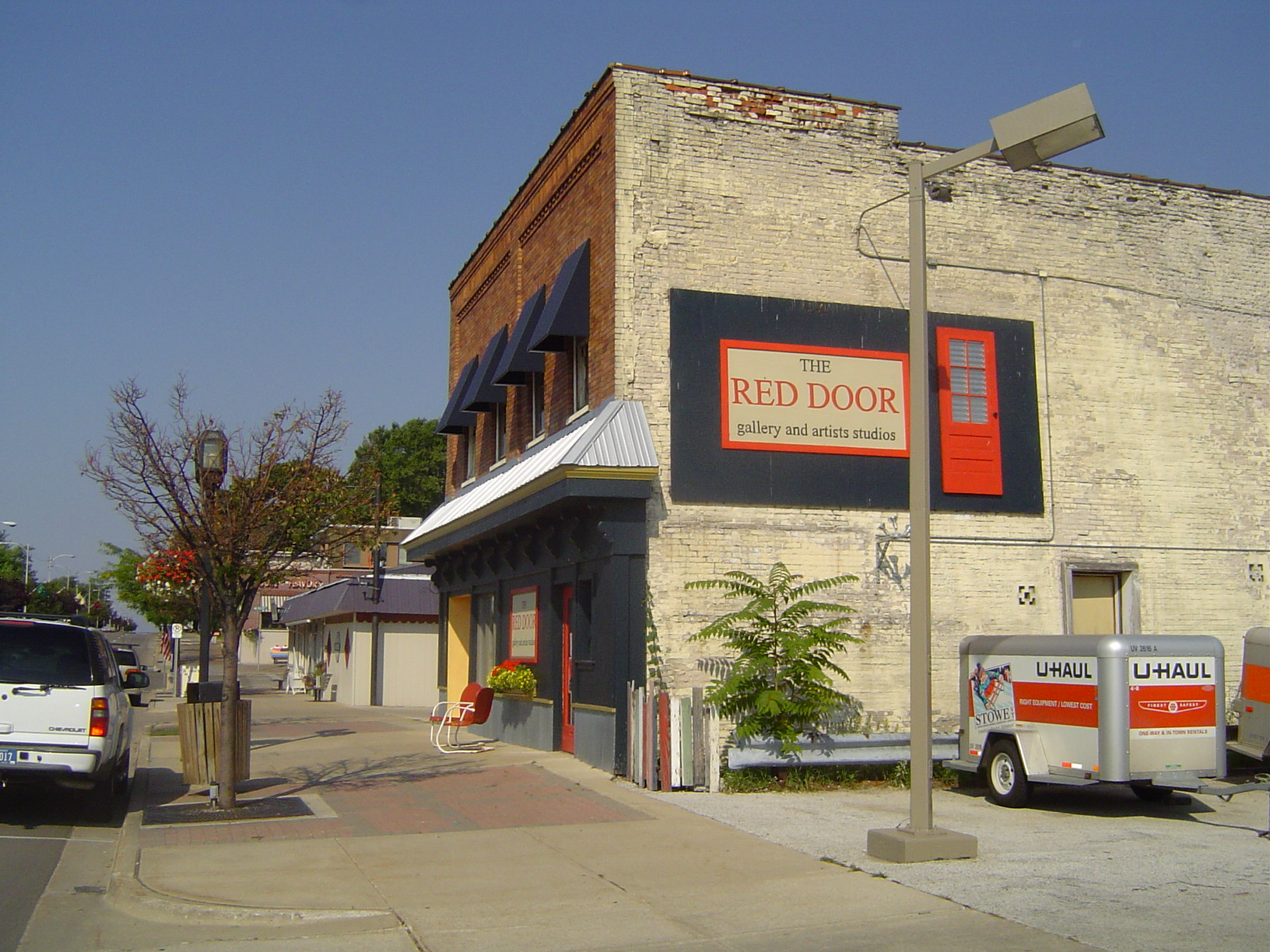
The Red Door Art Gallery

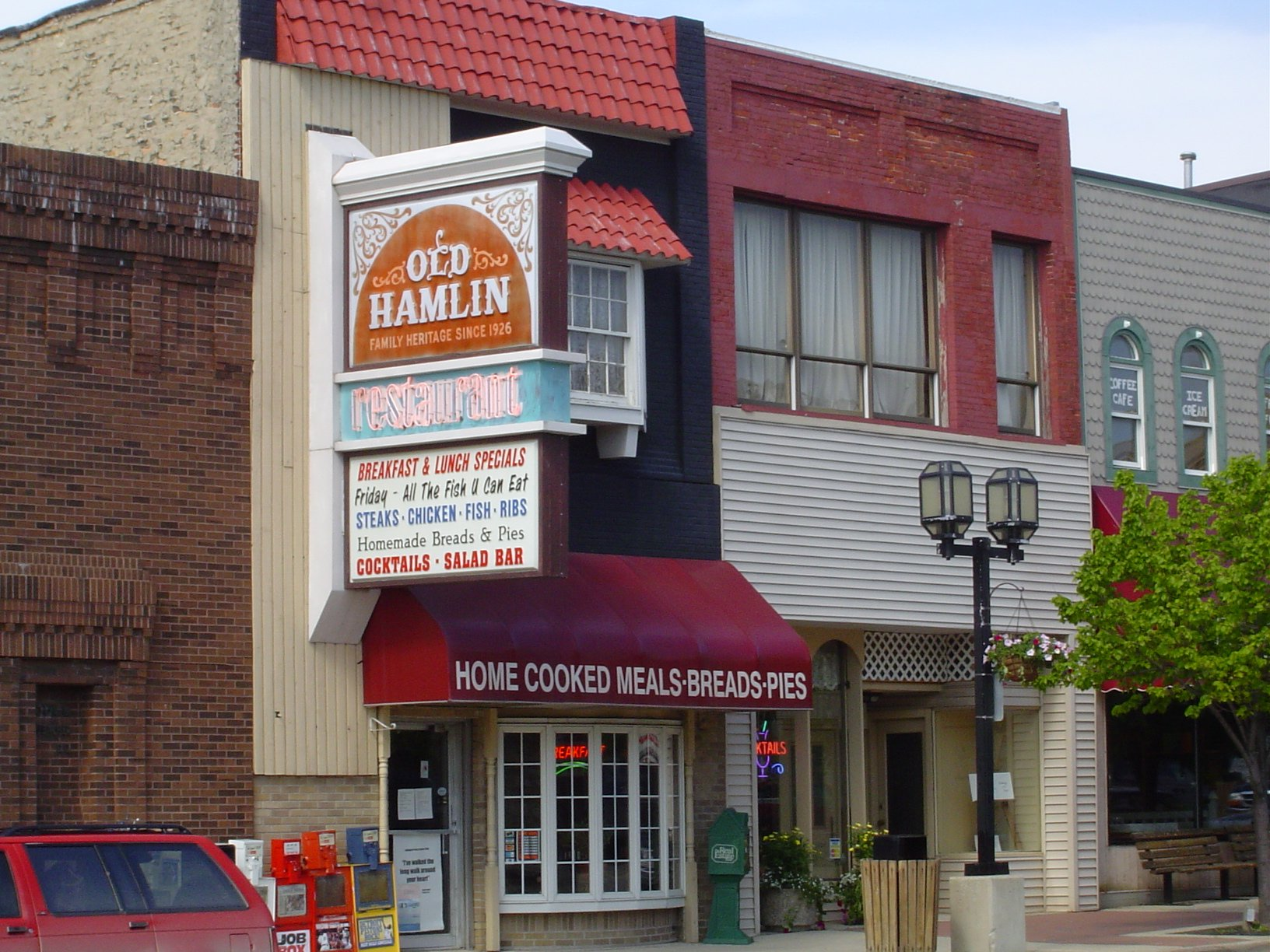
Old Hamlin Restaurant downtown

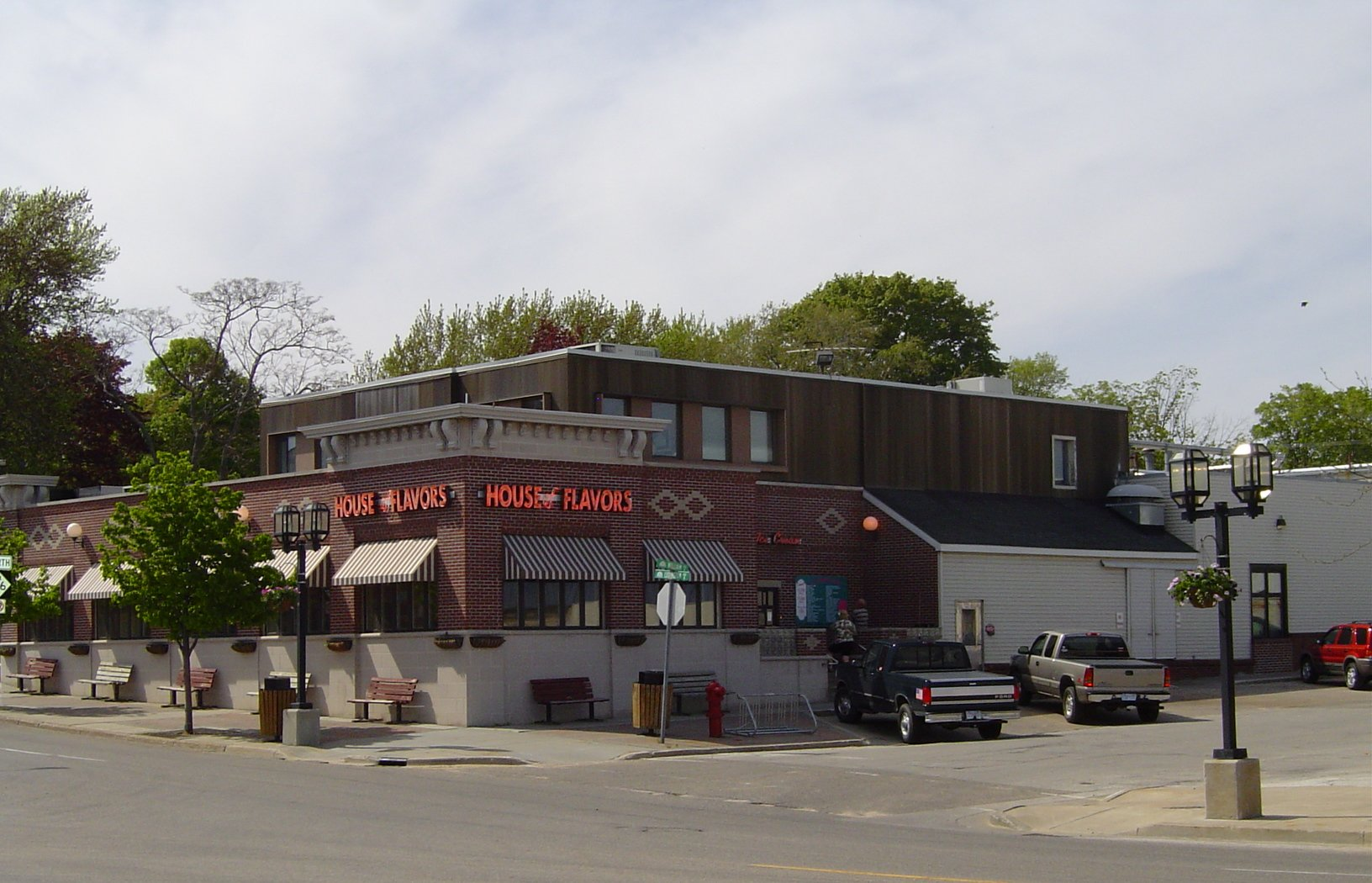
House of Flavors

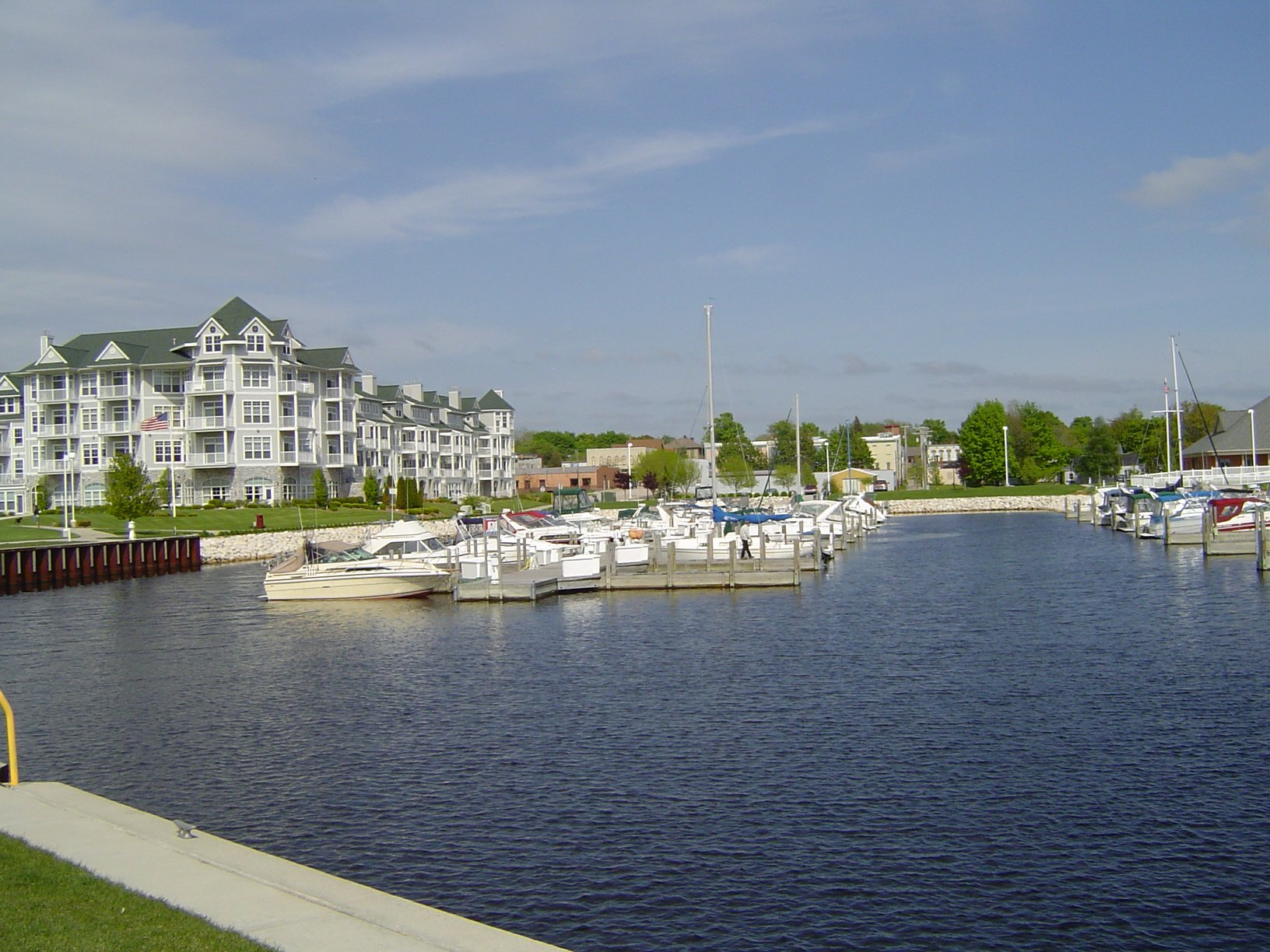
Harbor View Marina

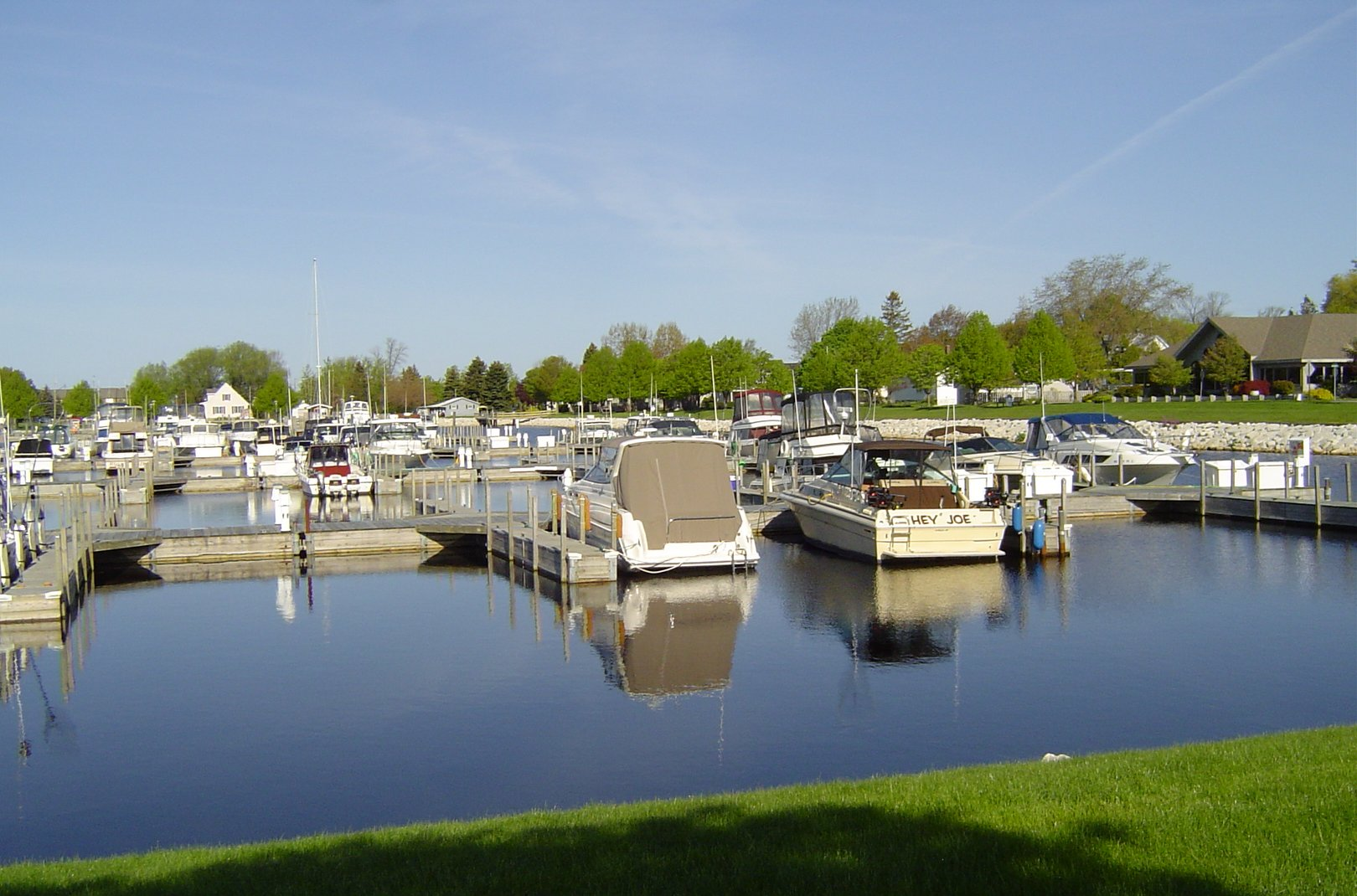
Ludington Municipal Marina

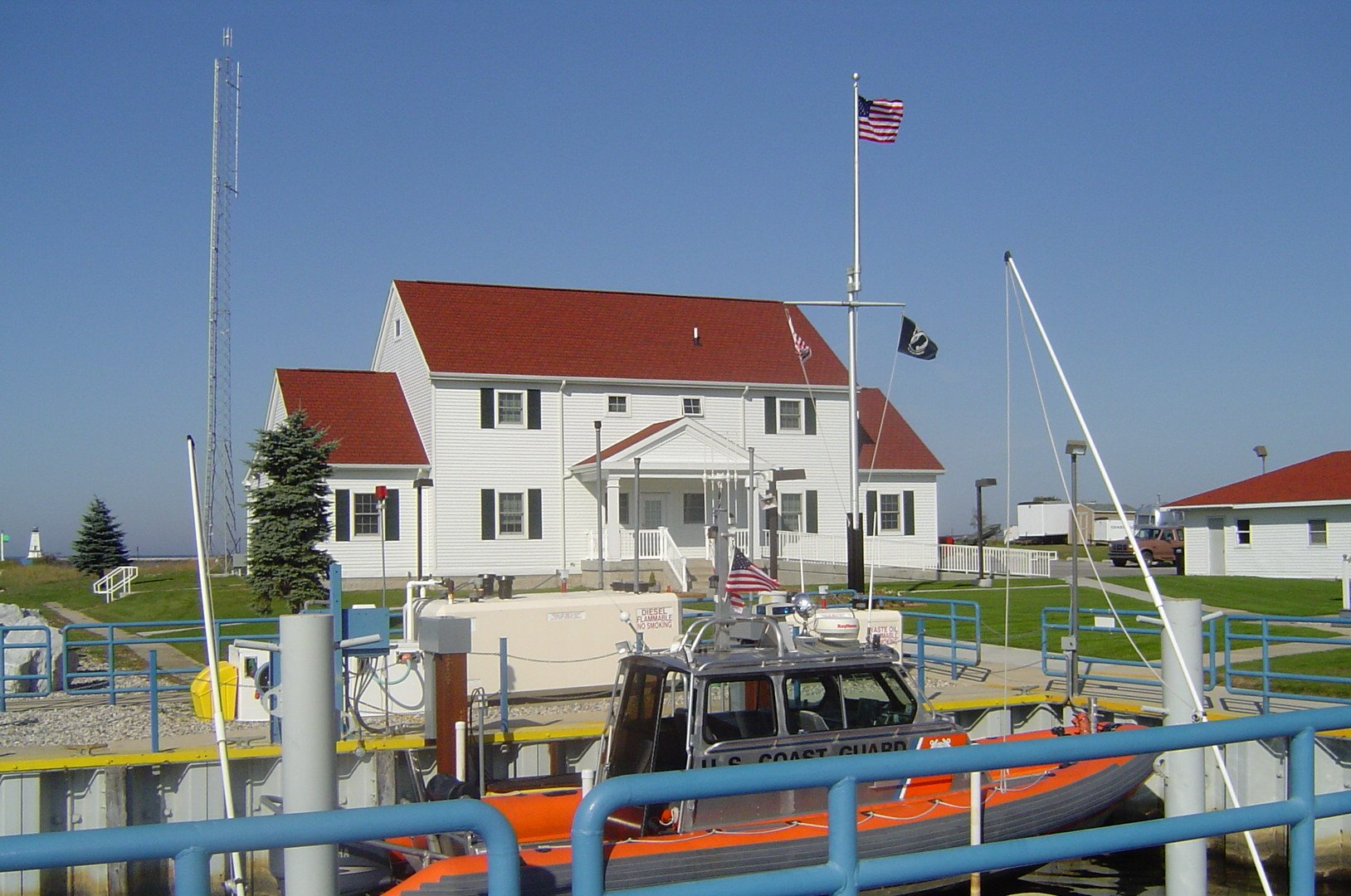
U.S. Coast Guard building

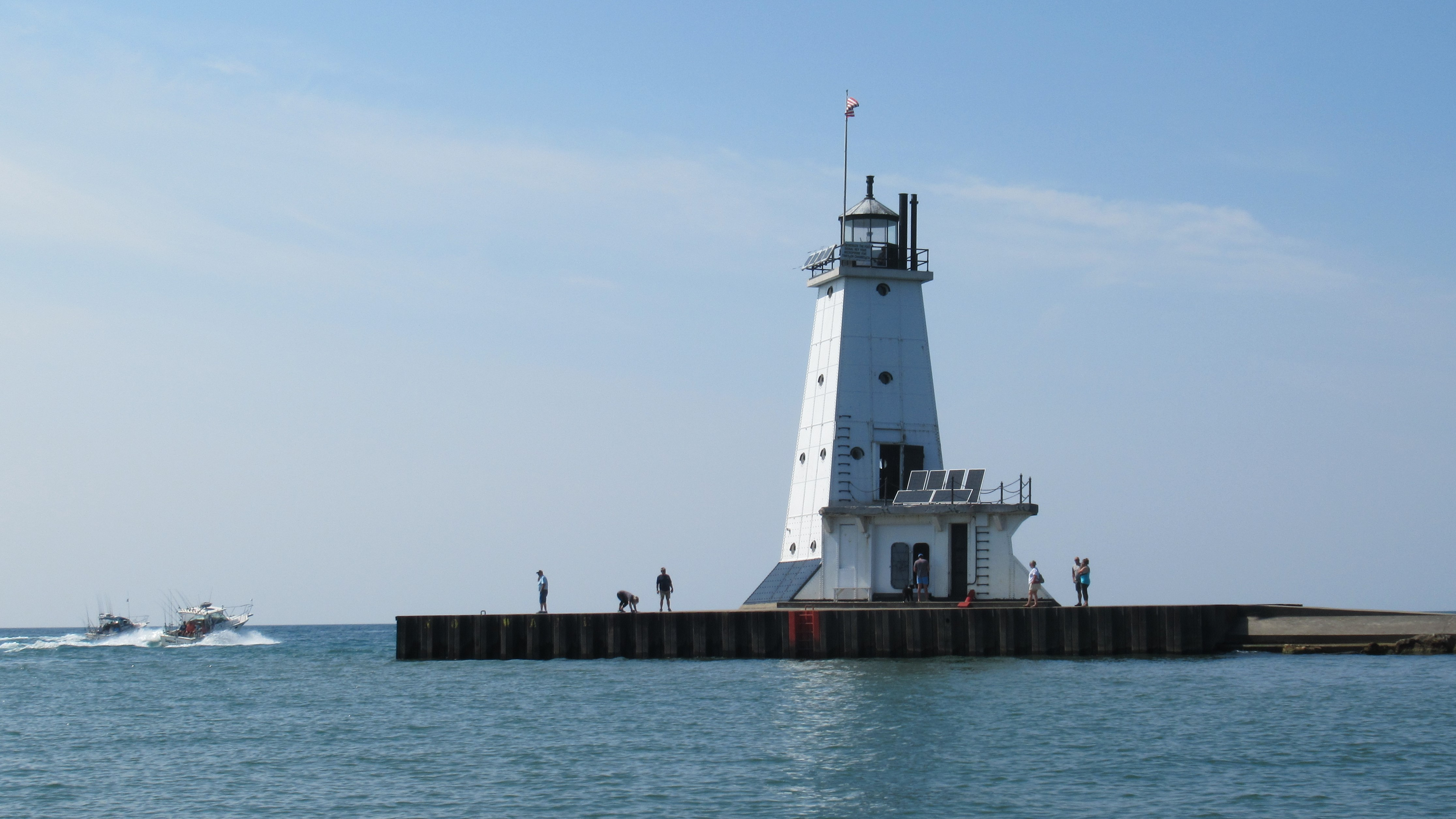
Ludington Light

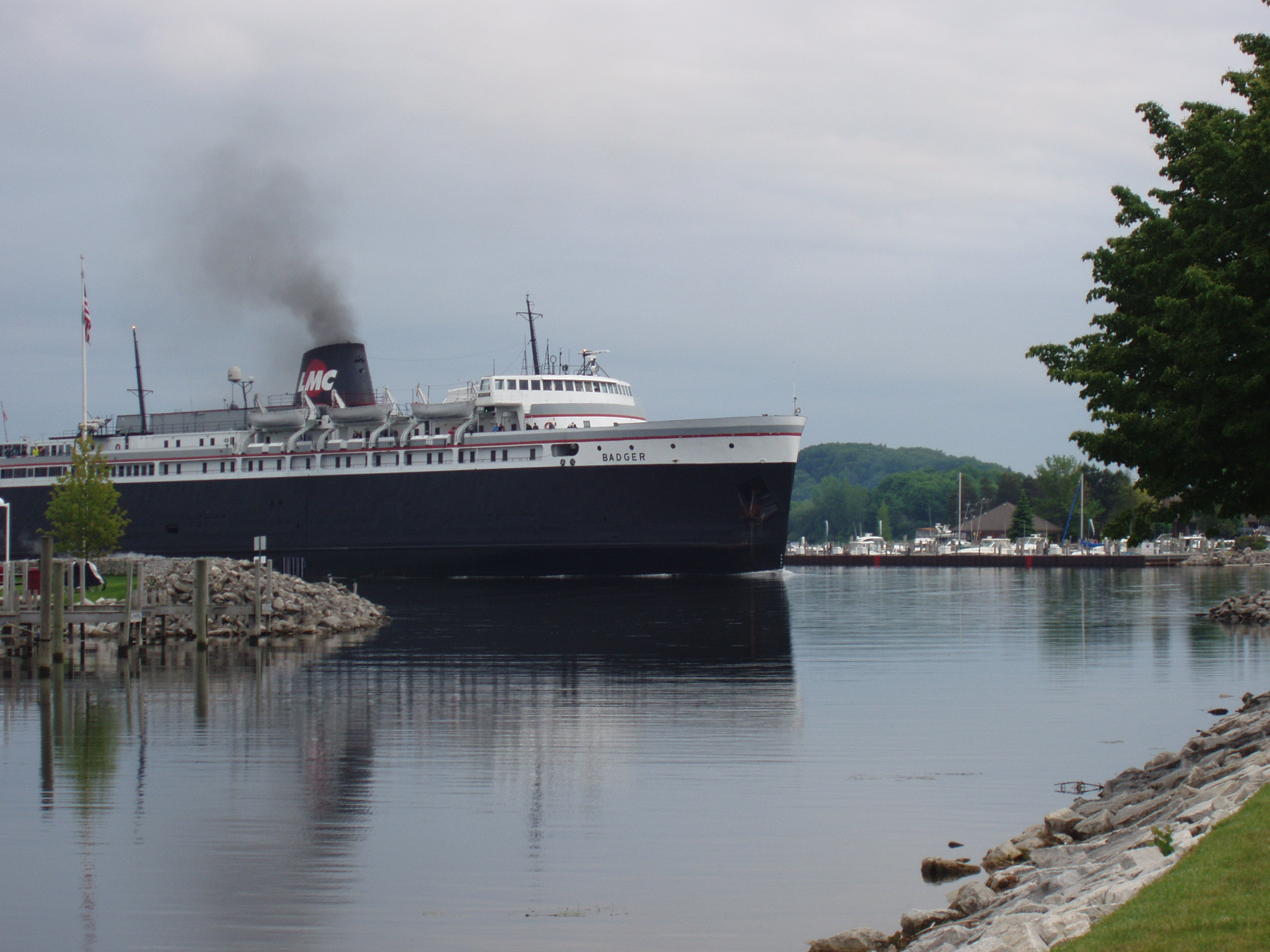
SS Badger at Ludington

Video of SS Badger sailing from Ludington (1 minute)

== See also ==
- Epworth Heights
- Haskelite
- Henry Ludington
- Ludington Public Library
- Ludington State Park
- SS Pere Marquette
