= Epworth Heights =

Private summer community

Coordinates: 43.97898°N 86.4654°W

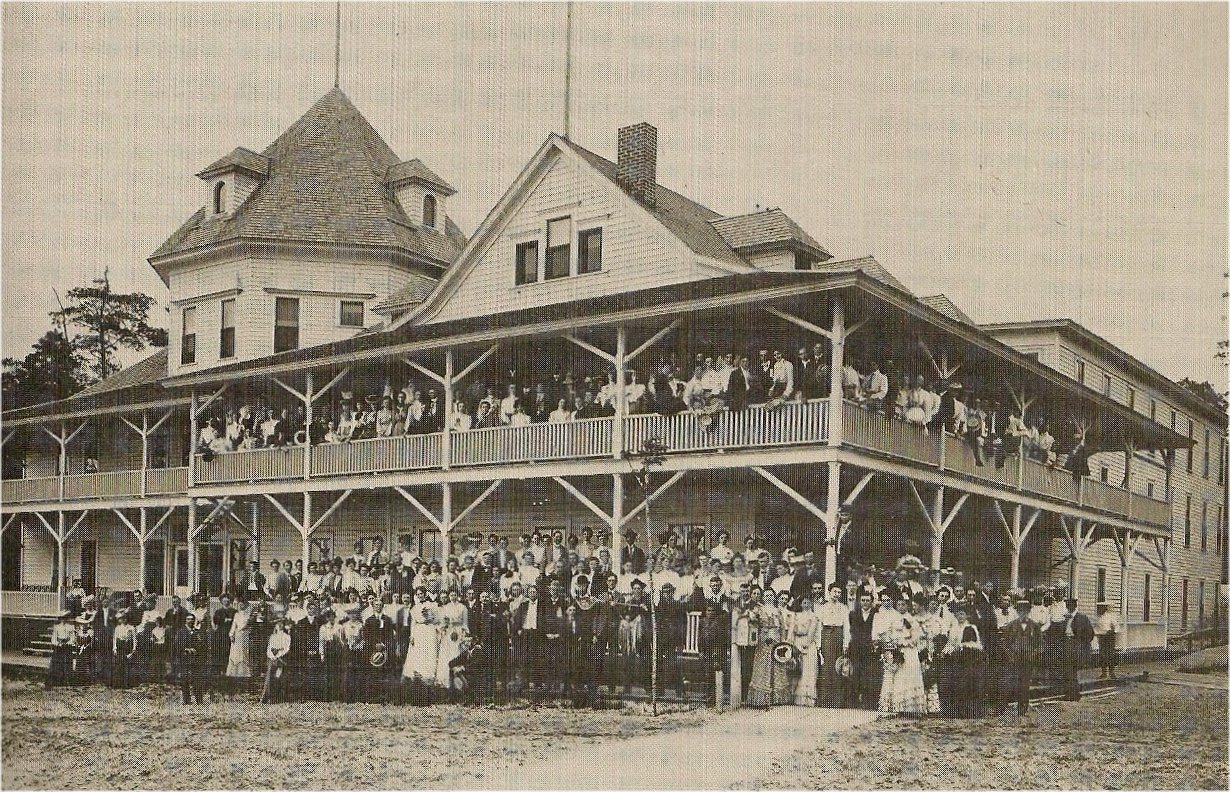
Epworth Heights Hotel, ca. 1905

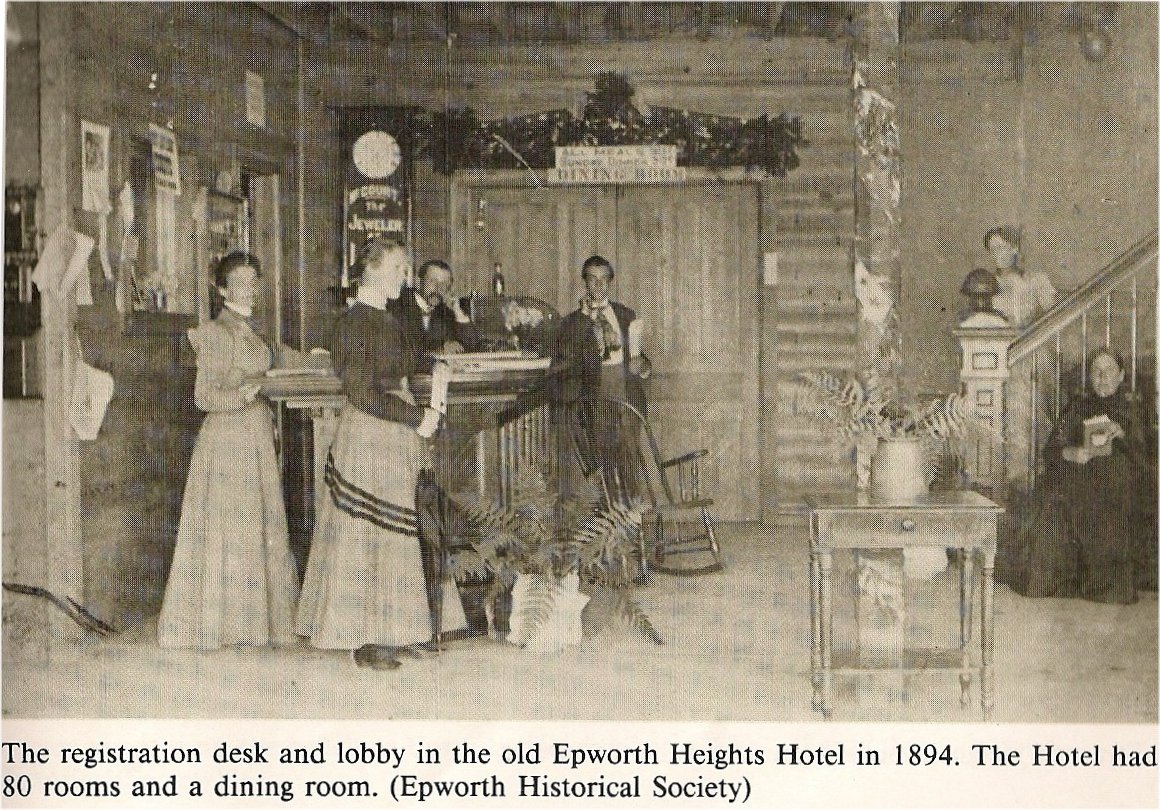

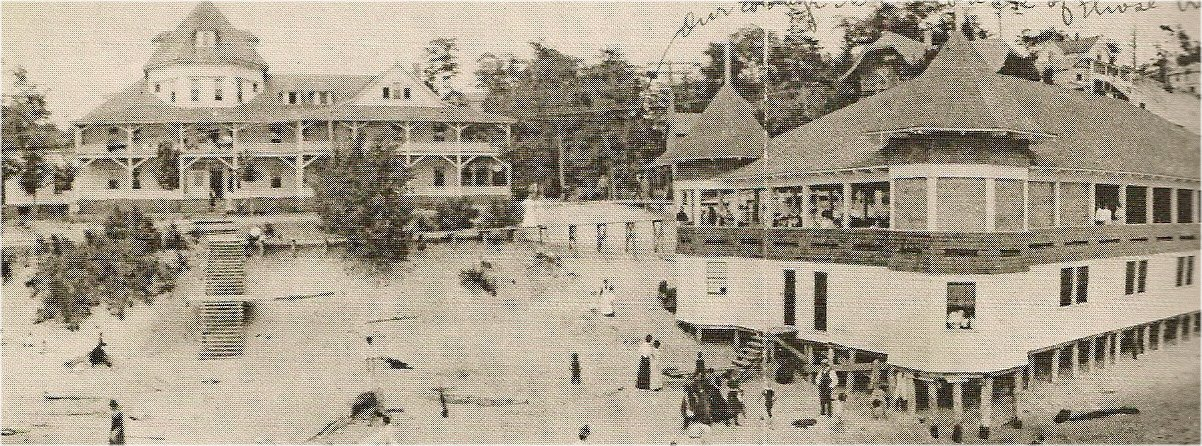
Epworth Heights main beach, c.1908

Epworth Heights is a private summer community located on the Lake Michigan shore north of Ludington, Michigan, in the United States. Founded in 1894 by a group of Methodists as the Epworth League Training Assembly, it continues to operate as a domestic nonprofit corporation under Michigan's Summer Resort and Assembly Associations Act 39 of 1889. It is formally known as The Epworth Assembly, Inc.

== Founding ==
The summer resort known as Epworth Heights (now Epworth Assembly) was founded in 1894 as The Epworth League Training Assembly. Epworth began as a Methodist training camp on the shores of Lake Michigan. The mission statement drawn up read as follow: “Established 1894 for the purchase and improvement of grounds to be occupied for summer homes, for camp meetings, for meetings of assemblies or associations and societies organized for intellectual or scientific culture and for the promotion of the cause of religion and morality.”

An agreement between The Citizen's Development Company of Ludington, The Flint and Pere Marquette Railroad, and The Epworth Training Assembly, was signed on May 6 of that year. By mid-July, a mere ten weeks later, the Hotel, Auditorium and classrooms that had been hastily built were ready for the first session, July 18 to August 5. Families camped in tents on the sandy beaches and enjoyed the programming as well as the lakeside vistas.

== Early years ==
It was decided that leasing plots of land to allow for the building of cottages would be a good way to raise money and assure a future for the venture. For five dollars a year, a member of the assembly could purchase the right to build a cottage on his leasehold. Several cottages were built in 1895; by 1909, there were close to 100. These were not year-round cottages, but simple wooden structures built along walks that lined the Lake Michigan shore.

== Later years ==
The Chautauqua programs began in 1896 and continued until 1924, but were replaced with other speakers of a spiritual or cultural nature. Over the years, the number of cottages has grown to over two hundred, each named by the family holding the lease. Cottages are also available for rent, but there are many requirements for renting including three letters of reference from lease-holders.
