= Adjutant General of Wisconsin =

"State agency in Wisconsin, United States"

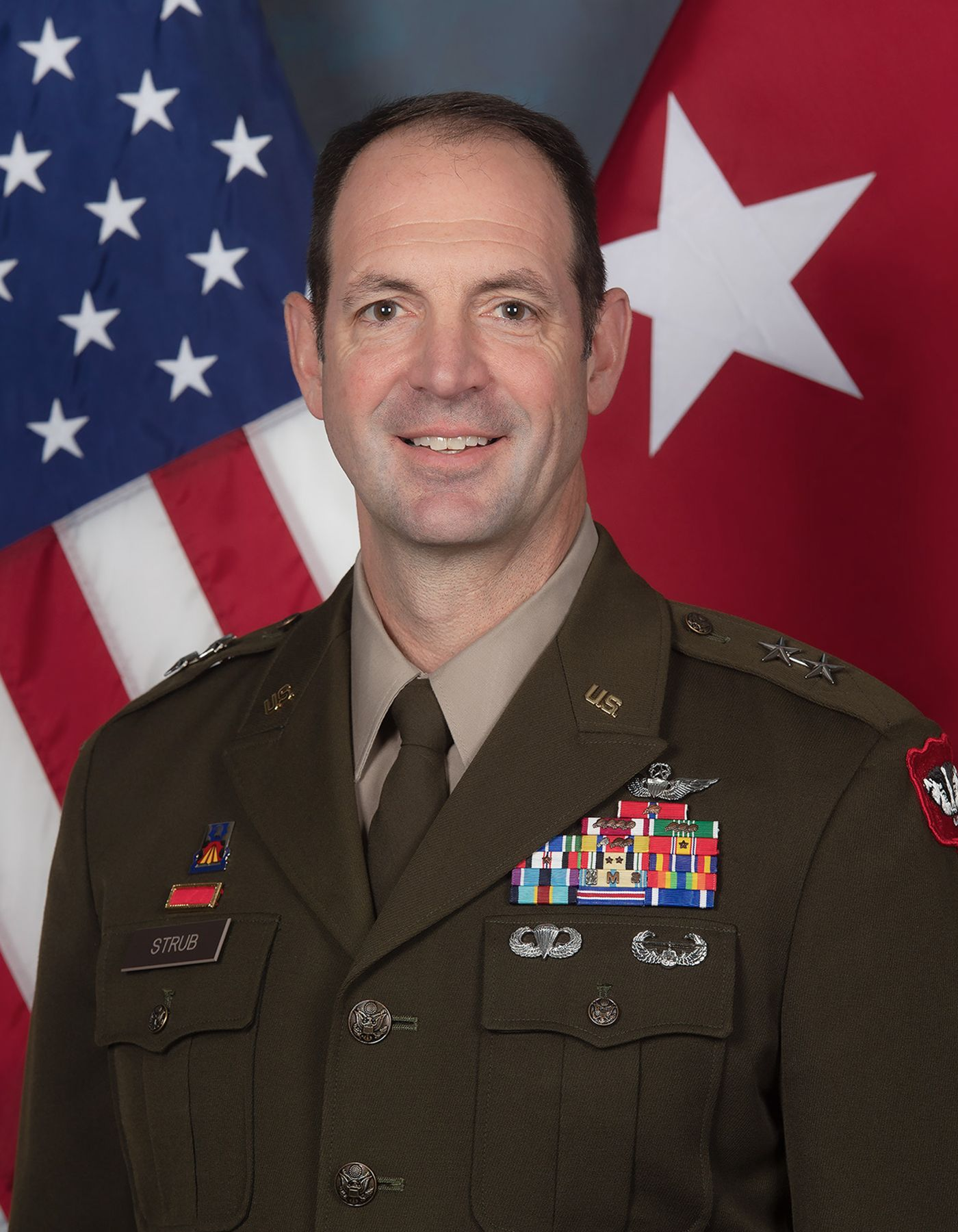
- Incumbent; Major General Matthew J. Strub since April 18, 2025; 1 year, 5 months and 3 days
- Term length: 5 years, may be appointed to successive terms
- Deputy: Brion J. Aderman
- Website: https://dma.wi.gov/leadership/

The Adjutant General of Wisconsin is the commander of the Wisconsin National Guard which includes both the Wisconsin Army National Guard, the Wisconsin Air National Guard, and, when active, the Wisconsin State Defense Force and Wisconsin Naval Militia. The Adjutant General (or 'TAG') is responsible for all state, non-federalized military and reports directly to the Governor of Wisconsin. Wisconsin's TAG is appointed by the governor and currently serves a fix term of five years and may be appointed successively.

== Appointment ==
According to Wisconsin Statute §15.31 of the Wisconsin State Legislature the Adjutant General of Wisconsin must meet the following requirements:

1. Hold the rank of Colonel (O-6)
2. Except for those qualified under sub (4), be a current participating member of one of the following components:
  - The Wisconsin Army National Guard
  - The Army National Guard
  - The United States Army Reserve
  - The Wisconsin Air National Guard
  - The United States Air Force
3. Be fully qualified to receive federal recognition at the minimum rank of Brigadier General and have successfully completed a war college course or the military equivalent acceptable to the appropriate service.
4. If the applicant is already federally recognized they must meet the following requirements:
  - Be retired from active drilling status within the next two years
  - Basis of retired status was with one of the components noted in sub (2)
  - Be 62 years old or less
  - Continue to be eligible for federal recognition as a Major General.

The Adjutant General is appointed by the Governor of Wisconsin. There have been 34 people who have served as the Adjutant General of Wisconsin, four of which only held the office as an interim appointee. William L. Utley and Edwin E. Bryant are currently the only two Adjutant Generals of Wisconsin who were elected for two nonconsecutive terms. Utley served as the state's Adjutant General during the first few years of the American Civil War, while Edwin E. Bryant served during the reconstruction era. The longest serving Adjutant General of Wisconsin was Ralph Immell who served as Adjutant General of Wisconsin from June 1, 1923 to May 11, 1946, as well as serving in World War II.

== List of Adjutant Generals of Wisconsin ==
The following have served as Adjutant General of Wisconsin Territory:

No.	Image	Name	Took office	Left office	Appointed by (Governor)
1		William Rudolph Smith	July 20, 1839	April 1, 1851	Henry Dodge; James Duane Doty; Nathaniel P. Tallmadge; Nelson Dewey

The following have served as Adjutant General of Wisconsin:

No.	Image	Name	Took office	Left office	Appointed by (Governor)
2		William A. Barstow	April 1, 1851	April 1, 1852	Nelson Dewey
3		William L. Utley	April 1, 1852	April 1, 1854	Leonard J. Farwell
4		John McManman	April 1, 1854	April 1, 1856	William A. Barstow
5		Amasa Cobb	April 1, 1856	April 1, 1860	Coles Bashford
6		James A. Swain	April 1, 1860	April 25, 1861	Alexander Randall
7		William L. Utley	April 25, 1861	January 7, 1862	Alexander Randall
8		Augustus Gaylord	January 7, 1862	April 30, 1866	Louis P. Harvey
9		James Kerr Proudfit	April 30, 1866	March 28, 1868	Lucius Fairchild
10		Edwin E. Bryant	March 28, 1868	January 2, 1872	Lucius Fairchild
11		Robert Monteith	January 2, 1872	April 11, 1874	Cadwallader C. Washburn
12		Alfred C. Parkinson	April 11, 1874	January 11, 1876	William Robert Taylor
13		George A. Hannaford	January 11, 1876	May 9, 1876	Harrison Ludington
14		Edwin E. Bryant	May 9, 1876	January 2, 1882	Harrison Ludington; William E. Smith
15		Chandler P. Chapman	January 2, 1882	January 7, 1889	Jeremiah M. Rusk
16		George W. Burchard	January 7, 1889	January 5, 1891	William D. Hoard
17		Joseph Doe	January 5, 1891	December 15, 1893	George Wilbur Peck
18		Otto H. Falk	December 15, 1893	January 7, 1895	George Wilbur Peck
19		Charles King	January 7, 1895	January 4, 1897	William H. Upham
20		Charles R. Boardman	January 4, 1897	September 30, 1913	Edward Scofield.; Robert M. La Follette; James O. Davidson; Francis E. McGovern
21		Orlando Holway	October 1, 1913	February 3, 1923	Francis E. McGovern; Emanuel L. Philipp; John J. Blaine
-		John G. Salsman	February 3, 1923	June 1, 1923	Acting adjutant general
22		Ralph M. Immell	June 1, 1923	May 11, 1946	John J. Blaine
-		Alvin A. Kuechenmeister	October 10, 1942	September 25, 1946	Acting adjutant general while Immell was overseas
23		John F. Mullen	September 25, 1946	July 31, 1950	Walter Samuel Goodland
-		George Sherman	July 31, 1950	October 2, 1950	Acting adjutant general
24		Ralph J. Olson	October 2, 1950	January 29, 1969	Oscar Rennebohm
25		James Jay Lison Jr.	January 29, 1969	February 14, 1977	Warren P. Knowles
26		Hugh Simonson	February 14, 1977	April 24, 1979	Patrick Lucey
27		Raymond Matera	April 24, 1979	December 21, 1989	Lee S. Dreyfus
28		Jerald D. Slack	December 21, 1989	January 12, 1996	Tommy Thompson
29		Jerome J. Berard	January 12, 1996	August 8, 1997	Tommy Thompson
30		James G. Blaney	August 8, 1997	August 9, 2002	Tommy Thompson
31		Albert H. Wilkening	August 9, 2002	August 3, 2007	Scott McCallum
32		Donald P. Dunbar	August 3, 2007	December 31, 2019	Jim Doyle; Scott Walker
-		Gary L. Ebben	December 31, 2019	February 24, 2020	Acting adjutant general
33		Paul E. Knapp	February 24, 2020	June 6, 2024	Tony Evers
-		David W. May	June 6, 2024	April 17, 2025	Acting adjutant general
34		Matthew J. Strub	April 17, 2025	Incumbent	Tony Evers

== See also ==
- Wisconsin Department of Military Affairs
- Politics of Wisconsin
- Wisconsin National Guard
- Wisconsin Army National Guard
- Wisconsin Air National Guard
- Wisconsin State Defense Force
- Wisconsin Naval Militia
