= Wisconsin Department of Military Affairs =

Wisconsin state government agency of military affairs

Agency overview
- Formed: August 1, 1967; 59 years ago
- Jurisdiction: Wisconsin
- Headquarters: 2400 Wright St. Madison, Wisconsin
- Employees: 556.5 (2021)
- Annual budget: $283,263,900 (2021)
- Agency executives: Tony Evers, Commander-in-Chief; Major General Matthew J. Strub, Adjutant General
- Website: dma.wi.gov

The Wisconsin Department of Military Affairs (DMA) is an agency of the Wisconsin state government responsible for maintaining Wisconsin's armed military force and responding to state or national emergencies. The department oversees the Wisconsin Army National Guard, the Wisconsin Air National Guard, Wisconsin Emergency Management, and, when organized, the Wisconsin State Defense Force.

The department headquarters are located at 2400 Wright Street, in Madison, on the grounds of the Dane County Regional Airport. The commander-in-chief of the department is the Governor of Wisconsin, but the department is overseen by an adjutant general appointed by the governor. The current commander-in-chief is Tony Evers, the current adjutant general is Major General Matthew J. Strub.

== History ==
The Department of Military Affairs was created by the 1967 Wisconsin government reorganization act, sponsored by governor Warren P. Knowles (1967 Wisconsin Act 75). At the time, the agency was established to unify command of National Guard and the state Armory Board. In 1989, the division of Emergency Management (also known as Wisconsin Emergency Management) was transferred to the Department of Military Affairs from the Department of Administration.

== Adjutant generals of Wisconsin ==
#	General	Took office	Left office	Notes
1	William Rudolph Smith	July 20, 1839	April 1, 1851	Appointed by Henry Dodge. Reappointed by James Duane Doty, Nathaniel P. Tallmadge, Henry Dodge. Reappointed by Nelson Dewey.
2	William A. Barstow	April 1, 1851	April 1, 1852	Appointed by Nelson Dewey.
3	William L. Utley	April 1, 1852	April 1, 1854	Appointed by Leonard J. Farwell.
4	John McManman	April 1, 1854	April 1, 1856	Appointed by William A. Barstow.
5	Amasa Cobb	April 1, 1856	April 1, 1860	Appointed by Coles Bashford.
6	James A. Swain	April 1, 1860	April 25, 1861	Appointed by Alexander Randall. Resigned to accept commission in Union Army.
7	William L. Utley	April 25, 1861	January 7, 1862	Appointed by Alexander Randall. Resigned to accept commission as colonel of the 22nd Wisconsin Infantry Regiment.
8	Augustus Gaylord	January 7, 1862	April 30, 1866	Appointed by Louis P. Harvey.
9	James Kerr Proudfit	April 30, 1866	March 28, 1868	Appointed by Lucius Fairchild.
10	Edwin E. Bryant	March 28, 1868	January 2, 1872	Appointed by Lucius Fairchild.
11	Robert Monteith	January 2, 1872	April 11, 1874	Appointed by Cadwallader C. Washburn.
12	Alfred C. Parkinson	April 11, 1874	January 11, 1876	Appointed by William Robert Taylor.
13	George A. Hannaford	January 11, 1876	May 9, 1876	Appointed by Harrison Ludington.
14	Edwin E. Bryant	May 9, 1876	January 2, 1882	Appointed by Harrison Ludington. Reappointed by William E. Smith.
15	Chandler P. Chapman	January 2, 1882	January 7, 1889	Appointed by Jeremiah M. Rusk.
16	George W. Burchard	January 7, 1889	January 5, 1891	Appointed by William D. Hoard.
17	Joseph Doe	January 5, 1891	December 15, 1893	Appointed by George Wilbur Peck.
18	Otto H. Falk	December 15, 1893	January 7, 1895	Appointed by George Wilbur Peck.
19	Charles King	January 7, 1895	January 4, 1897	Appointed by William H. Upham.
20	Charles R. Boardman	January 4, 1897	September 30, 1913	Appointed by Edward Scofield. Reappointed by Robert M. La Follette. Reappointed by James O. Davidson. Reappointed by Francis E. McGovern.
21	Orlando Holway	October 1, 1913	February 3, 1923	Appointed by Francis E. McGovern. Reappointed by Emanuel L. Philipp. Reappointed by John J. Blaine. Died in office.
-	John G. Salsman	February 3, 1923	June 1, 1923	Acting adjutant general.
22	Ralph M. Immell	June 1, 1923	May 11, 1946	Appointed by John J. Blaine. Took leave from office to serve overseas in World War II.
-	Alvin A. Kuechenmeister	October 10, 1942	September 25, 1946	Acting adjutant general while Immell was overseas.
23	John F. Mullen	September 25, 1946	July 31, 1950	Appointed by Walter Samuel Goodland.
-	George Sherman	July 31, 1950	October 2, 1950	Acting adjutant general.
24	Ralph J. Olson	October 2, 1950	January 29, 1969	Appointed by Oscar Rennebohm. Died in a plane crash at Milwaukee Mitchell International Airport.
25	James Jay Lison Jr.	January 29, 1969	February 14, 1977	Acting adjutant general until February 5, 1969. Appointed by Warren P. Knowles. Resigned.
26	Hugh Simonson	February 14, 1977	April 24, 1979	Appointed by Patrick Lucey.
27	Raymond Matera	April 24, 1979	December 21, 1989	Appointed by Lee S. Dreyfus.
28	Jerald D. Slack	December 21, 1989	January 12, 1996	Appointed by Tommy Thompson.
29	Jerome J. Berard	January 12, 1996	August 8, 1997	Appointed by Tommy Thompson.
30	James G. Blaney	August 8, 1997	August 9, 2002	Appointed by Tommy Thompson.
31	Albert H. Wilkening	August 9, 2002	August 3, 2007	Appointed by Scott McCallum.
32	Donald P. Dunbar	August 3, 2007	December 31, 2019	Appointed by Jim Doyle. Reappointed by Scott Walker.
-	Gary L. Ebben	December 31, 2019	February 24, 2020	Acting adjutant general
33	Paul E. Knapp	February 24, 2020	June 6, 2024	Appointed by Tony Evers.
-	David W. May	June 6, 2024	April 17, 2025	Acting adjutant general.
34	Matthew J. Strub	April 17, 2025	Current	Appointed by Tony Evers

== See also ==
- Wisconsin National Guard
- Wisconsin Army National Guard
- Wisconsin Air National Guard
- Wisconsin Emergency Management
- Wisconsin State Defense Force
