= Paul E. Knapp =

United States Air Force general

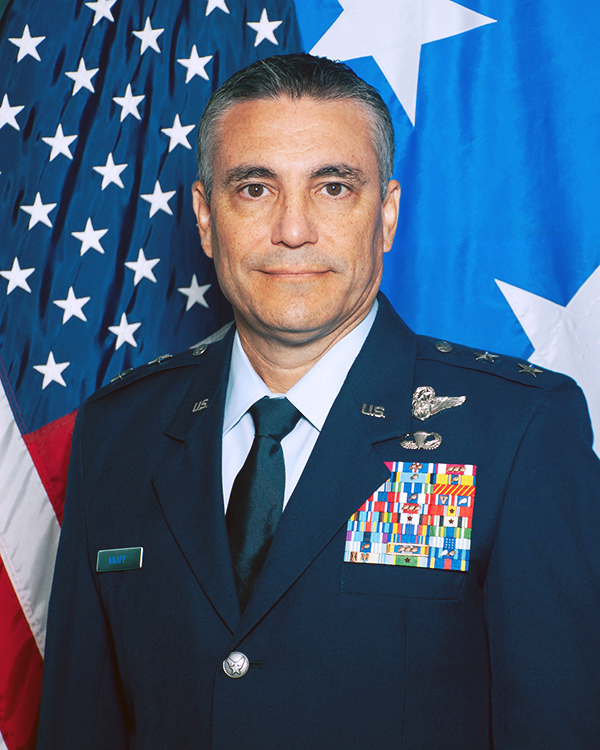

33rd Adjutant General of Wisconsin
- In office February 24, 2020 – June 6, 2024
- Governor: Tony Evers
- Preceded by: Gary L. Ebben
- Succeeded by: David W. May

Personal details
- Born: Antigo, Wisconsin, U.S.
- Spouse: Renee Knapp
- Children: 2
- Education: United States Air Force Academy

Military service
- Allegiance: United States
- Branch/service: Wisconsin Air National Guard
- Rank: Major general
- Commands: Wisconsin National Guard
- Awards: Legion of Merit; Distinguished Flying Cross (3); Meritorious Service Medal (4); Air Medal (6)

Paul E. Knapp is a major general in the Wisconsin Air National Guard. He resigned from his position as the adjutant general of the Wisconsin National Guard on June 6, 2024.

== Career ==
Maj. Gen. Knapp commissioned into the Air Force in 1992 as a graduate of the U.S. Air Force Academy. He started on active duty as a Special Agent for the Air Force Office of Special Investigations. He then attended navigator training at Randolph AFB, Texas, and Pensacola Naval Air Station, Florida. After completing training, Knapp served two operational tours as an F-15E Strike Eagle weapon systems officer and one as an air liaison officer to the U.S. Army in South Korea. In August 2003 Knapp separated from active duty and joined the 95th Airlift Squadron of the 440th Airlift Wing, General Mitchell Air Reserve Station, Milwaukee, Wisconsin, flying the C-130H Hercules. He maintained various positions there until 2008. In February 2019, Knapp became the Mobilization Assistant to the Commander of Air Force Nuclear Weapons Center at Kirtland Air Force Base, New Mexico. There he directed the Air Force's nuclear modernization, acquisition and sustainment programs with more than 1,300 personnel at 18 locations worldwide.

On March 5, 2020, Knapp was appointed Adjutant General of the Wisconsin National Guard by Governor Tony Evers. The position has a five-year term and a promotion to major general. Knapp took the command from Brig. Gen. Joane Mathews and Brig. Gen. Gary L. Ebben who both took turns serving as interim adjutants general since the dismissal of former state adjutant Maj. Gen. Donald P. Dunbar by Governor Evers. On November 18, 2020, Knapp was nominated for federal recognition and United States Senate confirmation of his promotion to major general. On December 14, 2020, his promotion was confirmed by voice vote of the full Senate.

Knapp has served as an instructor, evaluator, flight commander, squadron commander, deputy operations group commander and vice wing commander. He has 681 combat hours, more than 262 combat sorties supporting operations Allied Force, Northern Watch, Southern Watch, Enduring Freedom, Iraqi Freedom and Joint Task Force Horn of Africa. Flying in 21 different aircraft, Knapp has over 3,000 flying hours.

== Education ==
- Bachelor of Science, Political Science, Japanese minor, U.S. Air Force Academy
- Master of Science, Technology Management, University of Maryland, College Park
- Air War College

== Personal life ==
Knapp is a native of Antigo, Wisconsin. He currently resides in Whitefish Bay, Wisconsin, with his wife, Dr. Renee Knapp and their two children.

== Awards and badges ==
US Air Force Command Pilot Badge
Parachutist Badge

Legion of Merit
Distinguished Flying Cross with two oak leaf clusters
Meritorious Service Medal with three oak leaf clusters
Air Medal with silver oak leaf cluster
Aerial Achievement Medal with oak leaf cluster
Air Force Commendation Medal with oak leaf cluster
Air Force Combat Action Medal
Gallant Unit Citation
Air Force Outstanding Unit Award with Valor device and silver oak leaf cluster
Combat Readiness Medal with three oak leaf clusters
National Defense Service Medal with bronze star
Armed Forces Expeditionary Medal
Afghanistan Campaign Medal with bronze star
Iraq Campaign Medal with bronze star
Global War on Terrorism Expeditionary Medal
Global War on Terrorism Service Medal
Korean Defense Service Medal
Humanitarian Service Medal
Nuclear Deterrence Operations Service Medal

== Dates of rank ==
Knapp commissioned into the Air Force in 1992. His current rank is major general in the Wisconsin National Guard.

Insignia	Rank	Date
	Second Lieutenant	May 27, 1992
	First Lieutenant	May 27, 1994
	Captain	May 27, 1996
	Major	Dec. 1, 2002
	Lieutenant Colonel	Aug. 2, 2007
	Colonel	June 2, 2012
	Brigadier General	Dec. 12, 2018
	Major General	Mar. 5, 2020
