= David Dziobkowski =

American lawyer (born 1963)

David Michael Dziobkowski
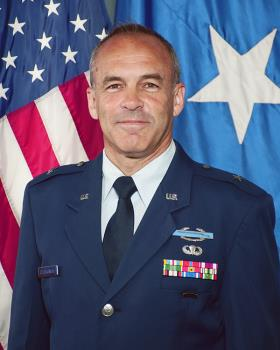
- Born: June 10, 1963 (age 61); Milwaukee, WI
- Education: United States Military Academy at West Point (B.A); William Mitchell College of Law (J.D)
- Occupation(s): Military Officer, Lawyer
- Years active: 1985–2021
- Organization(s): United States Army; Wisconsin Air National Guard
- Height: 5 ft 7 in (170 cm)
- Children: Samuel Dziobkowski

David Dziobkowski is a brigadier general in the Wisconsin Air National Guard.

== Career ==
Dzibokowski graduated from the United States Military Academy and served in the Gulf War as a member of the United States Army. He later earned a J.D. degree at William Mitchell College of Law as a civilian before joining the Wisconsin Air National Guard. Dzibkowski's positions have included serving as Judge Advocate General of the Wisconsin National Guard.
