= Albert H. Wilkening =

American major general (1946–2020)

Major General Albert H. Wilkening
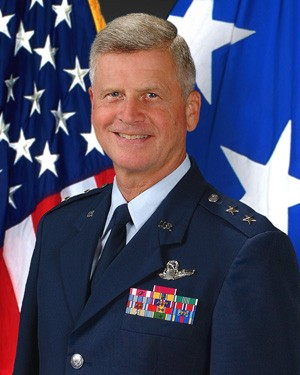
- Born: February 1, 1946; Freeport, New York, U.S.
- Died: April 8, 2020 (aged 74); Brooklyn, Wisconsin, U.S.
- Military career
- Allegiance: United States
- Branch: Air National Guard
- Service years: 1968–2007
- Rank: Major general
- Commands: Wisconsin Air National Guard; Wisconsin Department of Military Affairs
- Awards: See below

Albert H. Wilkening (February 1, 1946 – April 8, 2020) was the adjutant general of Wisconsin from 2002 to 2007, when he was succeeded by Donald P. Dunbar. He was responsible for both the federal and state missions of the Wisconsin Army and Air National Guard and the Wisconsin Division of Emergency Management. In March 2003 Wilkening was appointed by Governor Jim Doyle to head a new Homeland Security Council in Wisconsin and to be the governor's homeland security advisor. He died of pancreatic cancer in 2020, at the age of 74.

== Military career ==
Wilkening enlisted in the United States Air Force in 1968 and was commissioned a second lieutenant on March 28 of that year. Following pilot training at Webb Air Force Base, Texas, he served as a flight training instructor at Columbus Air Force Base, Mississippi until May, 1973. In August, 1973, he joined the Wisconsin Air National Guard. He has served in a variety of command and staff positions, including as commander of the 176th Tactical Fighter Squadron and deputy commander for Operations, 128th Tactical Fighter Wing. From December, 1990 to August, 2002, he served as deputy adjutant general for air, and commander of the Wisconsin Air National Guard. He was named adjutant general by Governor Scott McCallum and assumed office on September 1, 2002. Wilkening was a command pilot with more than 3,300 flying hours in the T-41, T-37, T-38, O-2A, OA-37, and A-10 aircraft.

== Education ==
- 1967 Bachelor of Arts degree in Psychology, Long Island University, New York
- 1973 Masters Degree in Guidance Counseling and Personnel, Mississippi State University, Mississippi
- 1976 Squadron Officer School
- 1979 Air Command and Staff College
- 1989 National Security Management Course

== Flight information ==
- Rating: Command Pilot
- Flight Hours: more than 3,300
- Aircraft Flown: T-41, T-37, T-38, O-2A, OA-37, A-10

== Awards and decorations ==
US Air Force Command Pilot Badge

Personal decorations
Width-44 crimson ribbon with a pair of width-2 white stripes on the edges	Legion of Merit
	Meritorious Service Medal with bronze oak leaf cluster
	Air Force Commendation Medal with bronze oak leaf cluster
Width-44 myrtle green ribbon with width-3 white stripes at the edges and five width-1 stripes down the center; the central white stripes are width-2 apart	Army Commendation Medal
	Air Force Achievement Medal
Unit awards
	Air Force Outstanding Unit Award with three bronze oak leaf clusters
	Air Force Organizational Excellence Award
Service awards
	Combat Readiness Medal with two bronze oak leaf clusters
Campaign and service medals
Width=44 scarlet ribbon with a central width-4 golden yellow stripe, flanked by pairs of width-1 scarlet, white, Old Glory blue, and white stripes	National Defense Service Medal with two bronze service stars
Service, training, and marksmanship awards
	Air Force Longevity Service Award with four bronze oak leaf clusters
	Armed Forces Reserve Medal with gold hourglass
	Small Arms Expert Marksmanship Ribbon with one bronze service star
	Air Force Training Ribbon

=== Other achievements ===
Board of directors, National Guard Association

== Effective dates of promotion ==
Promotions
Insignia	Rank	Date
	Major General	28 January 2004
	Brigadier General	12 August 1992
	Colonel	27 June 1989
	Lieutenant Colonel	16 November 1984
	Major	4 November 1978
	Captain	28 March 1971
	First Lieutenant	28 September 1969
	Second Lieutenant	28 March 1968
