= 128th Air Control Squadron =

- Active: 1947–present
- Country: United States
- Allegiance: Wisconsin
- Branch: Air National Guard
- Type: Squadron
- Role: Air Control
- Part of: Wisconsin Air National Guard
- Garrison/HQ: Volk Field Air National Guard Base, Wisconsin
- Motto(s): Strength Through Vigilance
- Decorations: Air Force Outstanding Unit Award

Commanders
- Current commander: Colonel Shonn Breton

The 128th Air Control Squadron (ACS) is one of the units of the Wisconsin Air National Guard based at Volk Field Air National Guard Base, located in Camp Douglas, WI. Originally established as the 128th Aircraft Control and Warning Squadron in 1947 at General Billy Mitchell Field, it was subsequently re-designated as a Control and Reporting Post, and a Forward Air Control Post-Heavy. In October 1991, the unit was transferred to its current base as the 128 Air Control Squadron.

The 128th ACS may be deployed worldwide to provide tactical air control, data links, and data transfer in the Theater Battle Management arena. The squadron provides picture from multiple sensors to the commander, including radar control, early warning, and deduction and tracking of surveillance data.

In 2016, the 128th ACS received an award as the best in the Air Force from fall 2011 to fall 2013, the fifth in their history. The unit was selected for exceptional command and control operations when in the Middle East, supporting Operation Enduring Freedom. They provided airspace surveillance, threat warning capabilities, and theater command and control. During this period, the unit also received the Air Force's First Sergeant of the Year.
