= List of Wisconsin state agencies =

This is a list of Wisconsin state agencies.

- Department of Administration
  - Division of Energy, Housing and Community Resources
  - Division of Personnel Management
- Department of Agriculture, Trade and Consumer Protection
- Department of Children and Families
- Department of Corrections
- Department of Employee Trust Funds
- Department of Financial Institutions
- Department of Health Services
- Department of Justice
- Department of Military Affairs
- Department of Natural Resources
- Department of Public Instruction
- Department of Revenue
- Department of Safety and Professional Services
- Department of Tourism
- Department of Transportation
- Department of Veteran Affairs
- Department of Workforce Development
- Housing and Economic Development Authority
- Public Service Commission
- University of Wisconsin System
- Economic Development Corporation
- Wisconsin Elections Commission
- Wisconsin Ethics Commission
- Wisconsin Technical College System
