= Volk Field Air National Guard Base =

Military airbase in Wisconsin, USA

- Camp Douglas, Wisconsin in the United States
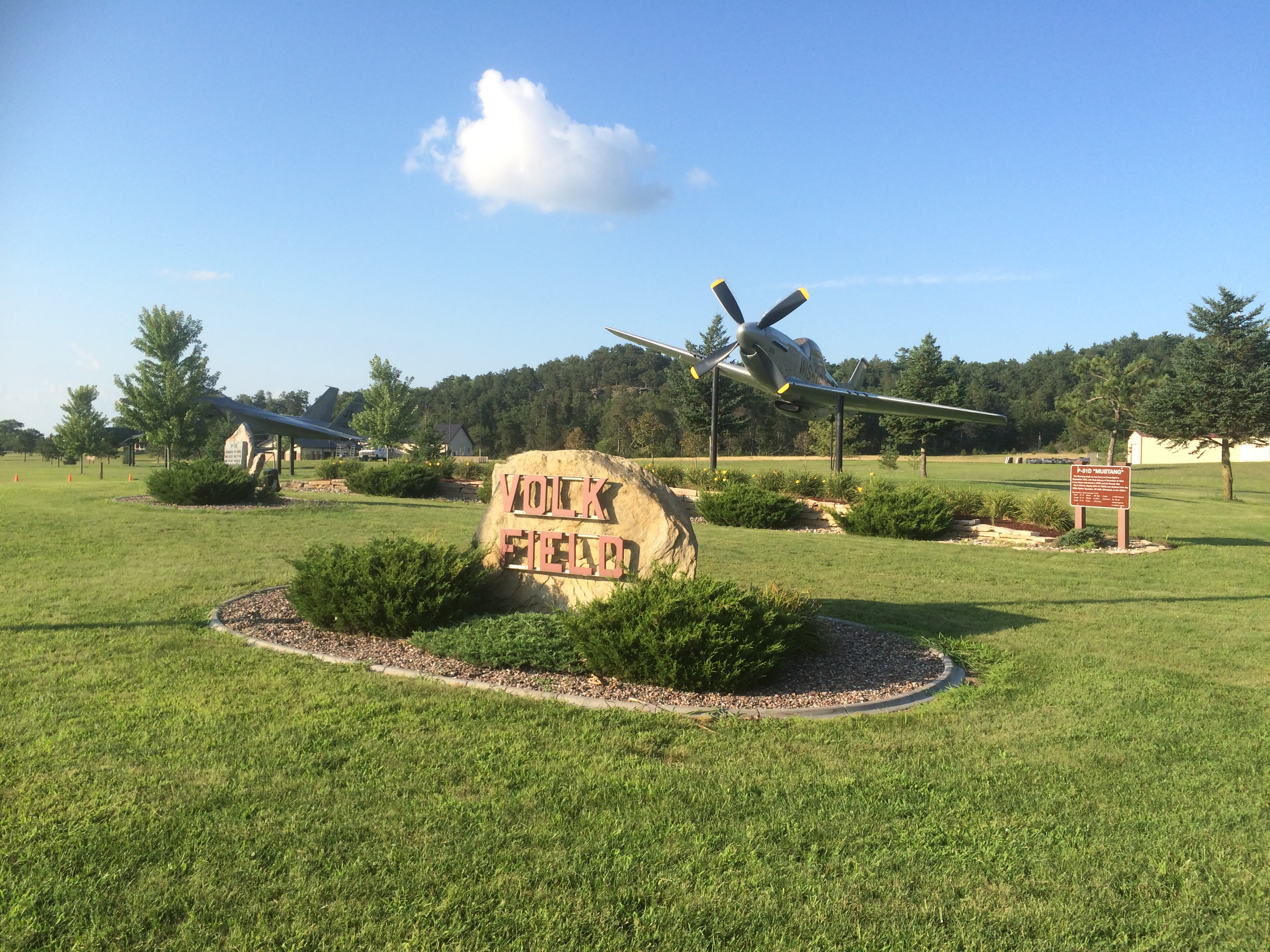
- The main entrance to Volk Field ANGB with a former Wisconsin Air National Guard P-51D Mustang on display

Site information
- Type: Air National Guard Base
- Owner: Department of Defense
- Operator: US Air Force (USAF)
- Controlled by: Wisconsin Air National Guard (ANG)
- Condition: Operational
- Website: www.volkfield.ang.af.mil

Location
- Location in the United States
- Coordinates: 43°56′20″N 090°15′13″W

Site history
- Built: 1888
- In use: 1888 – present

Garrison information
- Garrison: Volk Field Combat Readiness Training Center

Airfield information
- Identifiers: IATA: VOK, ICAO: KVOK, FAA LID: VOK, WMO: 726436
- Elevation: 277.9 metres (912 ft) AMSL
Runways
Direction	Length and surface
09/27	2,743.2 metres (9,000 ft) Asphalt/concrete

Volk Field Air National Guard Base (IATA: VOK, ICAO: KVOK, FAA LID: VOK) is a military airport located near the village of Camp Douglas, in Juneau County, Wisconsin, United States. It is also known as the Volk Field Combat Readiness Training Center (CRTC). The base also houses Camp Williams, which is supported by the Wisconsin Army National Guard.

== History ==
=== Early history ===
The origin of the Volk Field Combat Readiness Training Center (CRTC) can be traced back to 1888 when the state adjutant general, General Chandler Chapman, purchased a site for a rifle range and offered it to the state for a camp. In 1889 the state legislature authorized the governor to purchase land near the site for a permanent training site to include a dedicated pistol, rifle, and artillery training range for the Wisconsin National Guard.

By 1903 the camp had expanded to more than 800 acres (3.2 km^{2}) and was used for training by the then reorganized National Guard. In 1917 the site served as a major mobilization and training post for the 32nd Infantry Division which was made up almost exclusively of the Wisconsin and Michigan National Guard prior to its shipping to France as part of World War I.

The site was named Camp Williams in 1927 in honor of Lieutenant Colonel Charles R. Williams, the chief quartermaster of the post from 1917 until his death in 1926. Camp Williams grew slowly following the First World War, but with the development of the airplane, the first hard-surface runways were constructed in 1935 and 1936.

During World War II Camp Williams and Volk served as a mobilization and training station for elements of the 32nd Infantry Division which was made up almost exclusively of the Wisconsin and Michigan National Guard.

In 1954 the federal government leased the field from the state of Wisconsin for use as a permanent field training site. That same year work began on the air-to-ground gunnery range near Finley, Wisconsin. In 1957, the Wisconsin legislature officially designated the facility a permanent field training site and named it in memory of 1st Lieutenant Jerome A. Volk, the first Wisconsin Air National Guard pilot killed in combat in the Korean War.

A small graveyard near the front gate contains three burial plots, those of Lt. Col. Charles R. Williams, Camp Williams' namesake; his son, Private Robert W. Williams, who died in France during World War I; and Brigadier General Hugh M. Simonson, Adjutant General of the Wisconsin National Guard from 1977 until 1979. It also contains a memorial marker for Lt. Jerome Volk, for whom the installation was named, as his body was never recovered after being shot down over North Korea in 1951.

=== False alarm incident ===
During the Cuban Missile Crisis, staff at the base were on the lookout for sabotage operations that might precede any Soviet nuclear first strike. Around midnight on 25 October 1962, a guard at the Duluth Sector Direction Center 300 miles (480 km) west saw a figure climbing the security fence. He shot at it, and activated the sabotage alarm. This automatically set off similar alarms at all bases in the area. At Volk Field, the alarm was incorrectly wired, and the klaxon sounded, which ordered Air Defense Command (ADC) nuclear-armed F-106A interceptors to take off. The pilots had been told there would be no practice alert drills due to DEFCON 3 status, and, according to political scientist Scott D. Sagan, they "fully believed that a nuclear war had just started".

Since Volk Field did not have a control tower, its aircraft were dispatched from Duluth. Before the planes were able to take off, the base commander contacted Duluth and learned of the error. An officer in the command center drove his car onto the runway, flashing his lights and signaling to the aircraft to stop. The intruder was later identified as a black bear, instead of the expected Soviet Spetsnaz saboteurs.

Sagan writes that the incident had raised the possibility of an ADC interceptor accidentally shooting down a Strategic Air Command (SAC) bomber. ADC interceptor crews had not been given full information by the SAC of plans to move bombers to dispersal bases (such as Volk Field) or the classified routes flown by bombers on continuous alert as part of Operation Chrome Dome. Declassified ADC documents later revealed that "the incident led to changes in the alert klaxon system [...] to prevent a recurrence".

=== Recent history ===
In 1989 the site was re-designated a Combat Readiness Training Center (CRTC). During the 1990 Persian Gulf War, Volk Field was the primary point of embarkation for soldiers and equipment from nearby Fort McCoy, Wisconsin.

The 128th Air Control Squadron, Air Combat Maneuvering Instrumentation system (ACMI), Air Base Operability and Ability to Survive and Operate (ATSO) training missions were added in 1991.

Since 2006 Volk Field, along with Fort McCoy, has served as the primary location for Patriot Warrior, the largest annual training exercise for Air Force Reserve Command.

== Facilities ==
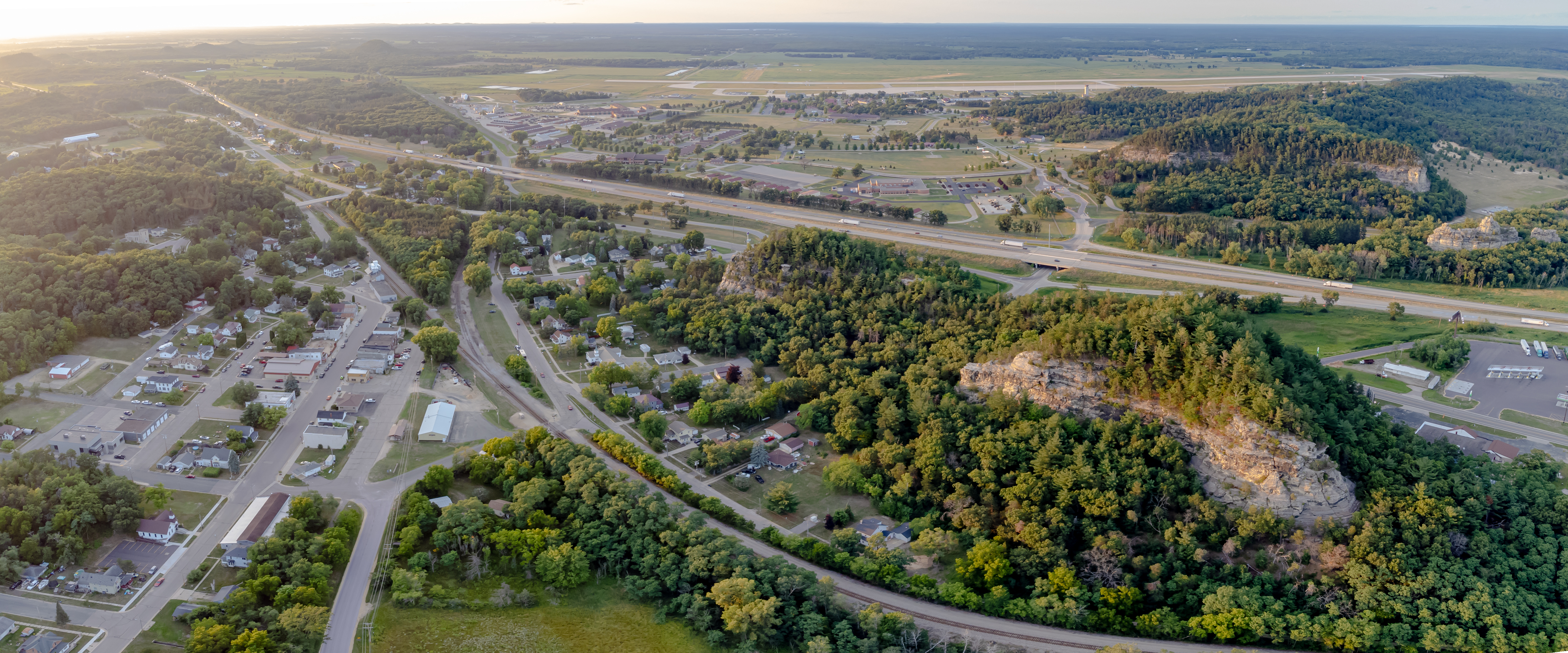
Camp Douglas, Wisconsin with Volk Field in the background

Volk Field has one asphalt / concrete paved runway (9/27) measuring 9,000 x 150 ft (2,743 x 46 m).

The Runway's Edge is the installation's all ranks club and provides hot food and drinks.

The Wisconsin National Guard Museum is located at Volk Field. It contains aircraft, helicopters, artillery, and armored vehicles used by the Wisconsin National Guard over its existence.

Camp Williams is the home of the United States Property & Fiscal Office for the State of Wisconsin, as well as the Army National Guard's Consolidated State Maintenance Facility.

== Wisconsin National Guard Museum ==
Wisconsin National Guard Museum
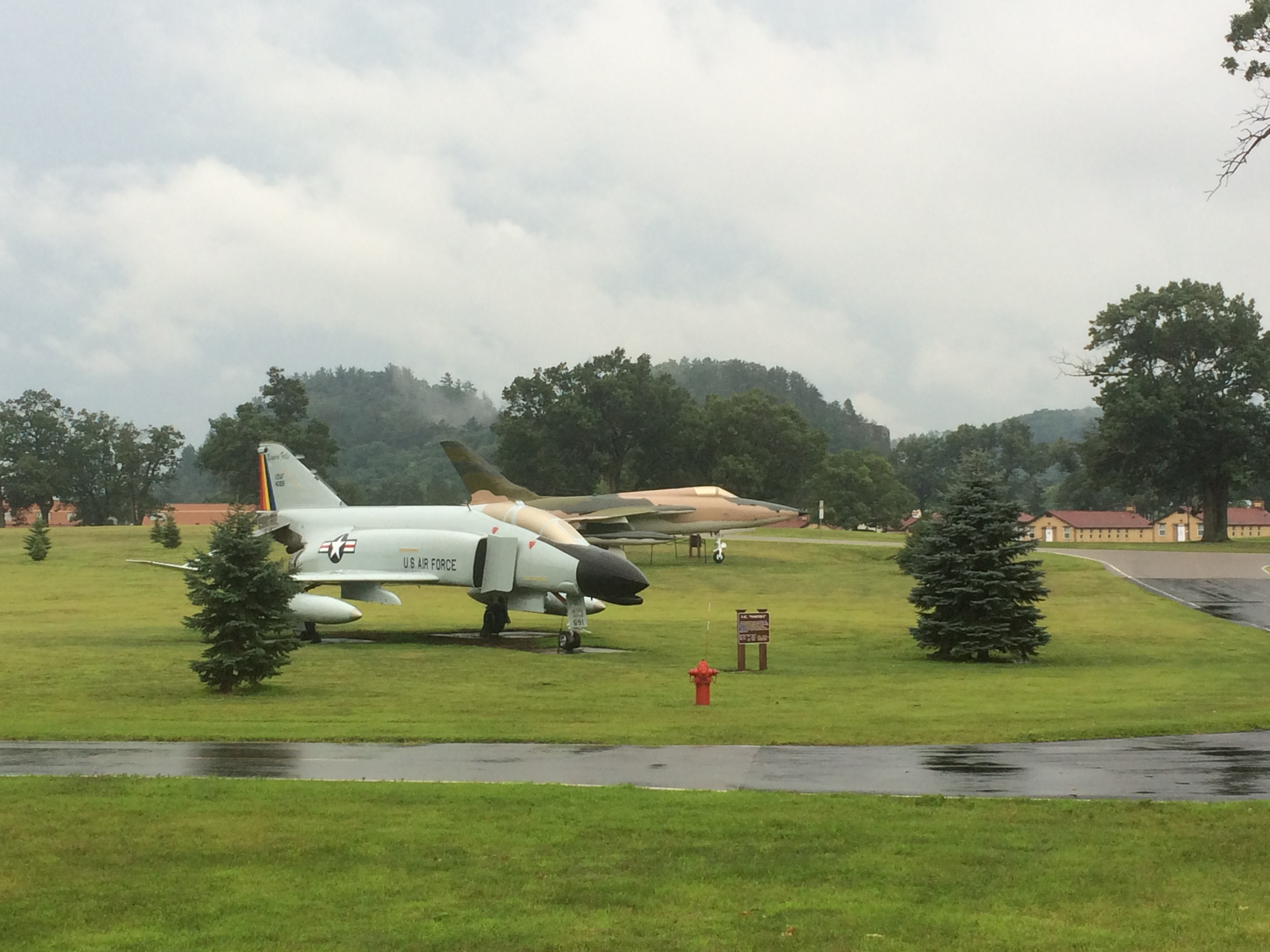
- Location: 101 Independence Dr, Camp Douglas, WI 54618
- Type: Aviation Military History

The Wisconsin National Guard Museum is located at Volk. It is housed in one of the former Officer's Quarters built in the late 19th-Century. The museum is open to the public five days a week. It also hosts a large air park with many former Air National Guard aircraft from several states, as well as artillery, helicopters, and tanks formerly of the Wisconsin National Guard.

- F-4C Phantom II – ex- New York Air National Guard aircraft, last serving with the 107th Fighter Wing at Niagara Falls Air National Guard Base. S/N 63-7594
- F-105B Thunderchief – "Xanadu" ex- 486th Fighter Squadron (Air Force Reserve) aircraft. The last F-105B to fly. S/N 57-5838.
- A-7D Corsair II – ex-Puerto Rico Air National Guard. Developed cracks in the wing spar while on a training mission to Volk in 1991 and left behind when the 156th Tactical Fighter Wing redeployed back to Puerto Rico. S/N 70-0982.
- F-84F Thunderstreak – ex-Illinois Air National Guard last flown by the 183rd Tactical Fighter Wing. S/N 51-9365
- F-86H Sabre – ex- New York Air National Guard aircraft with the 174th Tactical Fighter Group. Displayed in colors of Wisconsin Air National Guard's 176th Interceptor Squadron. S/N 53-1358
- P-51D Mustang ex-Wisconsin Air Guard aircraft. Last flew with the 109th Fighter Squadron. Served with the 8th Air Force during World War II. S/N 44-72989
- F-100C Super Sabre ex-Iowa Air National Guard aircraft. Last flew with the 132nd Tactical Fighter Wing. S/N 54-2106
- F-15B Eagle ex- Louisiana Air National Guard aircraft. Last flew with the 159th Fighter Wing. S/N 77-0159
- A-10A Thunderbolt II ex- Air Force Reserve aircraft. Last flew with the 434th Tactical Fighter Wing. S/N 77-0244
- F-102A Delta Dagger ex-Wisconsin Air National Guard aircraft. Last flew with the 176th Fighter Interceptor Squadron. S/N 56-1273
- TF-102A Delta Dagger ex-Wisconsin Air National Guard aircraft. Last flew with the 176th Fighter Interceptor Squadron. S/N 56-2353
- KC-97G ex-Wisconsin Air National Guard aircraft. Last flew with the 128th Air Refueling Wing. S/N 52-0905
- AH-1G Cobra ex- 8th Cavalry aircraft. S/N 70-16000
- UH-1H Huey ex- Wisconsin Army National Guard aircraft. Served in Vietnam with the 361st Aviation Company. S/N 66-16171
- M4A3 (75mm) Sherman R/N 3055802
- M48 Patton S/N 3748
- M60A3 R/N 09A06670, S/N 3688A

== See also ==
- List of nuclear close calls
- Wisconsin World War II Army Airfields
