= Wisconsin Emergency Management =

Wisconsin state government agency

Agency overview
- Formed: August 1, 1951; 75 years ago
- Preceding agency: State Council on Civil Defense (1940–1945)
- Jurisdiction: Wisconsin
- Headquarters: 2400 Wright St. Madison, Wisconsin
- Agency executive: Greg Engle, Administrator
- Website: wem.wi.gov

Wisconsin Emergency Management (WEM) (also known as the Division of Emergency Management) is an agency of the Wisconsin state government responsible for preparing and carrying out state emergency response plans, and assisting local jurisdictions in developing their own emergency plans. The division is also responsible for administering the Wisconsin Disaster Fund, as well as private or federal emergency relief funds. Wisconsin Emergency Management is a subordinate division of the Wisconsin Department of Military Affairs.

The division headquarters are located at 2400 Wright Street, in Madison, on the grounds of the Dane County Regional Airport. The administrator of the division is appointed by the Governor of Wisconsin with the advice and consent of the Wisconsin Senate. The current administrator is Greg Engle, appointed by Governor Tony Evers in August 2022.

== History ==
Wisconsin Emergency Management traces its history back to the establishment of the Office of Civil Defense, created by a 1951 act of the Wisconsin Legislature (1951 Wisconsin Act 443). At that time, the office was established within the Office of the Governor, and was primarily tasked with developing emergency plans in case of war. The director at that time was the adjutant general of Wisconsin.

In 1959, the office was renamed as the Bureau of Civil Defense and new responsibilities were added to the agency for natural and human-caused disasters. The 1967 Wisconsin government reorganization renamed it the Division of Emergency Government, and made it a part of the new Department of Local Affairs and Development. That division was then transferred to the Wisconsin Department of Administration in 1979. In 1989, the division was transferred to the Wisconsin Department of Military Affairs, and it was renamed to the Division of Emergency Management in 1995. Since 1997, the division was also tasked with responsibilities for hazardous chemical substances and spills.
