= Wisconsin Naval Militia =

Currently inactive naval militia of the state of Wisconsin

The Wisconsin Naval Militia is the currently inactive naval militia of the state of Wisconsin. The Wisconsin Naval Militia served as a military reserve force for the state of Wisconsin, and was organized as a naval parallel to the Wisconsin National Guard.

== History ==
The Wisconsin Naval Militia was first created on 28 April 1909 when the Wisconsin Legislature authorized a naval militia consisting of one battalion of four companies. The naval militia maintained units at Ashland and Bayfield until World War I. By 1914, the naval militia had reached a strength of 160 men organized into three companies.

In 1916, the naval militia was temporarily disbanded due to the inability of the state to procure a ship to be used for training purposes; however, new units were immediately reorganized in different parts of the state, funded with money raised by private donors. Most of its members joined the U.S. Navy due to the outbreak of World War One.

The naval militia was reorganized in 1927 with units in Milwaukee and Madison.

The Wisconsin Naval Militia was officially disbanded in 1955.

== Legal status ==
The right of states to organize and maintain naval militias is recognized by the federal government of the United States under 10 U.S. Code §7851. Any naval militia may receive access to vessels, material, armament, equipment, and other facilities of the Navy and the Marine Corps which are available to the Navy Reserve and the Marine Corps Reserve if 95% or more of the naval militia's manpower is recruited from the United States Navy Reserve or the United States Marine Corps Reserve.

== Reactivation effort ==
In the spring of 2001, the Wisconsin Department of Military Affairs announced the findings of a year-long study which found that reactivating the Wisconsin Naval Militia would likely prove to be a cost-effective enhancement to Wisconsin's emergency medical response capability. A bill which would have reactivated the naval militia passed the assembly of the Wisconsin Legislature by a wide margin but failed in the senate. Subsequent bills intended to reactivate the naval militia have also failed.

== See also ==
- State defense force
- United States Coast Guard Auxiliary
- United States Naval Sea Cadet Corps
- United States Power Squadrons
- Wisconsin National Guard
- Wisconsin State Defense Force
- Wisconsin Wing Civil Air Patrol
