= David W. May =

United States Air Force officer

David W. May is a retired Major General in the United States Air Force and former Adjutant General of the Wisconsin National Guard.

== Career ==
David W. May was commissioned as an officer in the U.S. Air Force in 1996. Among his early assignments was being stationed at Misawa Air Base in Japan with the 301st Intelligence Squadron. After returning to the United States, he was eventually named Executive Officer of the 737th Training Group at Lackland Air Force Base.

From 2005 to 2007, May was assigned to The Pentagon. Later, he served with United States Transportation Command before joining the Wisconsin Air National Guard.

With the Wisconsin Air National Guard, May was the Commanding Officer of the 54th Civil Support Team from 2011 until 2015, later followed by other titles including Assistant Adjutant General. In 2024, he became the Interim Adjutant General of Wisconsin.

May retired from the military in 2025. Decorations he received during his career include the Legion of Merit with oak leaf cluster, the Meritorious Service Medal with three oak leaf clusters, the Joint Service Commendation Medal, the Air and Space Commendation Medal with three oak leaf clusters, the Joint Service Achievement Medal and the Air and Space Achievement Medal with two oak leaf clusters.

== Education ==
- Kent State University
- University of Michigan
- Capella University
- Squadron Officer School
- Air Command and Staff College
- United States Army Command and General Staff College
- USAF Air War College
- Naval Postgraduate School
