= United States Property and Fiscal Officer =

The United States Property and Fiscal Officer (USPFO) position was created as part of the National Defense Act of 1916, Pub.L. 64–85, 39 Stat. 166, enacted June 3, 1916, a federal law that updated the Militia Act of 1903, which related to the organization of the military, particularly the National Guard. The USPFO is the single T-10 NG Officer through which all federal resources flow to the State Military Department in support of the Army and Air National Guard of that state.

== Selection and assignment ==
According to Title 32, §708 of the United States Code:

(a) The Governor of each State, the Commonwealth of Puerto Rico, Guam, and the Virgin Islands, and the commanding general of the National Guard of the District of Columbia, shall appoint, designate or detail, subject to the approval of the Secretary of the Army and the Secretary of the Air Force, a qualified commissioned officer of the National Guard of that jurisdiction who is also a commissioned officer of the Army National Guard of the United States or the Air National Guard of the United States, as the case may be, to be the property and fiscal officer of that jurisdiction. If the officer is not on active duty, the President may order him to active duty, with his consent, to serve as property and fiscal officer. Actual appointment authority rest of the Chief, National Guard Bureau.

(b) Each Property and Fiscal Officer shall—

(1) Receipt and account for all funds and property of the United States in the possession of the State National Guard for which he/she is Property and Fiscal Officer.

(2) Make returns and reports concerning those funds and that property, as required by the Army and Air Force Secretaries.

(3) When he ceases to hold that assignment, the property and fiscal officer resumes his/her status as an officer of the National Guard.

(c) The United States Property and Fiscal Officers. Serve as the single point of contact for all agencies both internal and external to the National Guard Bureau, for all matters relative to the United States Property and Fiscal Officers. Advise the Chief of the National Guard Bureau and the Assistant Chief of the National Guard Bureau in all matters relative to the United States Property and Fiscal Officers. Serve as the Office of Primary Responsibility for all inquiries, investigations, and any other actions that impact the United States Property and Fiscal Officers.

== Grants Officer ==
The United States Property and Fiscal Officer (grantor), serves as the grants officer (appointed by the Chief, National Guard Bureau), and is responsible for: Accounting for the proper obligation and expenditure of all Federal funds provided to the State/Territory through the Cooperative Agreement(s) (CA). Making returns and reports concerning those funds and that property, as required by the Secretary concerned. (32 U.S.C. Section 708). Ensuring Federal funds are expended on authorized projects, activities, or programs as set forth in the agreement or appendices. Must ensure adequate management and internal controls are in place to protect Federal interests. Coordinating and conducting, in conjunction with the State Military Department, periodic State/Territory level CA training related to the administration and execution of the CA program. (5) Reviewing and approving/disapproving State requests for advance payments. Granting an extension of the CA beyond the required fiscal year close-out date. Appointing a grants officer Representative (GOR). Appointing, on a DD 577, an ARNG CA Program Manager for each ARNG Appendix as the designated Federal employee to perform agreement duties outlined on the DD 577. Appointing, on a DD 577, an ANG CA Program Manager for each ANG Appendix as the designated Federal employee to perform day-to-day administrative duties outlined on the DD 577. This ANG appointment will exclude the fund's certification authorization which rests solely with the Assistant USPFO Air (Fiscal), normally the Wing Comptroller. Making the final decision on all matters pertaining to the Cooperative Agreement(s). The 2016 NG budget is approximately 25 Billion with 3.5 Billion reimbursed by the USPFOs to the 54 States/Territories.

== USPFO as the Real Property Accountable Officer (RPAO) ==
The USPFO serves as the RPAO for his or her state but normally delegates RPAO duties to the Construction and Facilities Management Officer (CFMO) for Army-funded real properties and The Base Civil Engineer for Air Force funded real properties. Ultimately the USPFO has the responsibility to ensure that the individual real property asset(s) is/are accurately captured in the real property inventory. The RPAO has the primary responsibility for the acceptance and accountability of individual real property assets into the real property inventory. The RPAO is responsible for real property custody, safekeeping, and the efficient and effective use of all lands, facilities, and space under their purview. The RPAO must ensure the documentation is retained in accordance with applicable laws, regulations, and instructions. The RPAO ensures that at least one RPUID is provided to the construction agent, no later than the time both design and funding authorizations are received. All other necessary RPUIDs will be provided to the construction agent for the completion of acceptance documentation. For construction projects, the RPAO or delegated representative accepts the facility into the inventory at placement in service by signing and dating the interim DD Form 1354 in block 24. A copy of the executed DD Form 1354 will be provided to the sponsoring entity at the acceptance transaction. For transfers of real property, the losing organization prepares the DD Form 1354. A carrying Memorandum between Deputy Assistant Secretaries of the losing and gaining Services is required for transfers of real property. UFC 1-300-08 16 April 2009 Change 2, August 2011. For assets found on site, the RPAO ensures the DD Form 1354 and appropriate supporting documentation are prepared and entered into the real property inventory. The USPFO must sign the state Real Property annually as validation the real properties listed are reimbursed correctly for NG use.
