= Joseph Doe =

American lawyer

Joseph Bodwell Doe Jr. (1855-1925) was a military officer, politician and baseball player.

== Biography ==
Joseph Bodwell Doe, Jr. was born on March 8, 1855, in Janesville, Wisconsin. He attended Racine College. Doe died on October 19, 1925, in Milwaukee, Wisconsin. His parents were Joseph Bodwell Doe Sr (1818-1890) and Anna Jane Marcher (1820-1898)

=== Baseball career ===
Doe played throughout the region as a catcher and second baseman. He held the world record for distance throwing for 20 years.

=== Military career ===
In 1878, Doe enlisted in the Wisconsin National Guard. He eventually became an officer, rising to the rank of captain before becoming Adjutant General. In 1891, Governor George Wilbur Peck appointed him Adjutant General of Wisconsin. Doe resigned in December 1893.

=== Political career ===
From 1888 to 1890, Doe was City Attorney of Janesville. Doe's father, Joseph P Doe, Sr had been the Mayor. Following his resignation as Adjutant General, he became the United States Assistant Secretary of War under President Grover Cleveland in 1893. He held the position until March 22, 1897. In August 1899, Doe became Special Counsel of Milwaukee, Wisconsin.
