= Wisconsin Wing Civil Air Patrol =

- Wisconsin Wing of Civil Air Patrol

Associated branches
- United States Air Force

Command staff
- Commander: Col Jeffrey Thomas
- Deputy Commander: Lt Col Joshua Cunningham / Maj Joseph Lange

Current statistics
- Cadets: 441
- Seniors: 608
- Total Membership: 1,049
- Website: wiwg.cap.gov
- Statistics as of 13 August 2026

The Wisconsin Wing of the Civil Air Patrol (CAP) is the highest echelon of Civil Air Patrol in the state of Wisconsin. Wisconsin Wing headquarters are located in Madison, Wisconsin. The Wisconsin Wing consists of over 1000 cadet and adult members at multiple locations across the state of Wisconsin.

== Mission ==
The Wisconsin Wing performs the three missions of the Civil Air Patrol: providing emergency services; offering cadet programs for youth; and providing aerospace education for both CAP members and the general public.

=== Emergency services ===
The Civil Air Patrol performs emergency services missions, including search and rescue (SAR) missions directed by the Air Force Rescue Coordination Center. Aircrews can perform visual and electronic searches, while ground teams home in on the search target with direction finding equipment. After a disaster, Civil Air Patrol personnel provide humanitarian support, including air/ground transportation, as well as an extensive communications network.

During the annual EAA AirVenture Oshkosh airshow, the wing is responsible for ES operations near and around the airshow, with members based at five airports in central Wisconsin, to provide search support and other assistance during the event. Emergency Services on the grounds of Wittman Regional Airport and AirVenture are the responsibility of National Blue Beret, a National Cadet Special Activity in CAP which includes flight marshaling operations on the taxiways around runway 27, crowd control in sensitive area of the airshow, monitoring for and tracking down errant radio signals, and recording the arrivals of inbound aircraft.

=== Cadet programs ===
The Civil Air Patrol offers cadet programs for youth aged 12 to 21. Cadets participate in CAP activities, practice leadership skills, and learn academic material. The curriculum of the cadet program is composed of physical fitness, leadership development, character development and aerospace education. Cadets may earn promotions and more advanced leadership positions as they progress through the program.

=== Aerospace education ===
The Civil Air Patrol offers aerospace education to both its own members and the general public.

The Civil Air Patrol provides aerospace education for CAP cadets and senior members by providing trips to conventions, airports, military bases, and other related places of aerospace interest.

To educate the public, the CAP informs the general public about aviation and space activities and supports thousands of aerospace education workshops for teachers at colleges and universities around the country. The Civil Air Patrol also maintains working relationships with local education agencies and several national organizations such as the FAA, NASA and the Air Force Association to facilitate aerospace education in schools.

== Organization ==
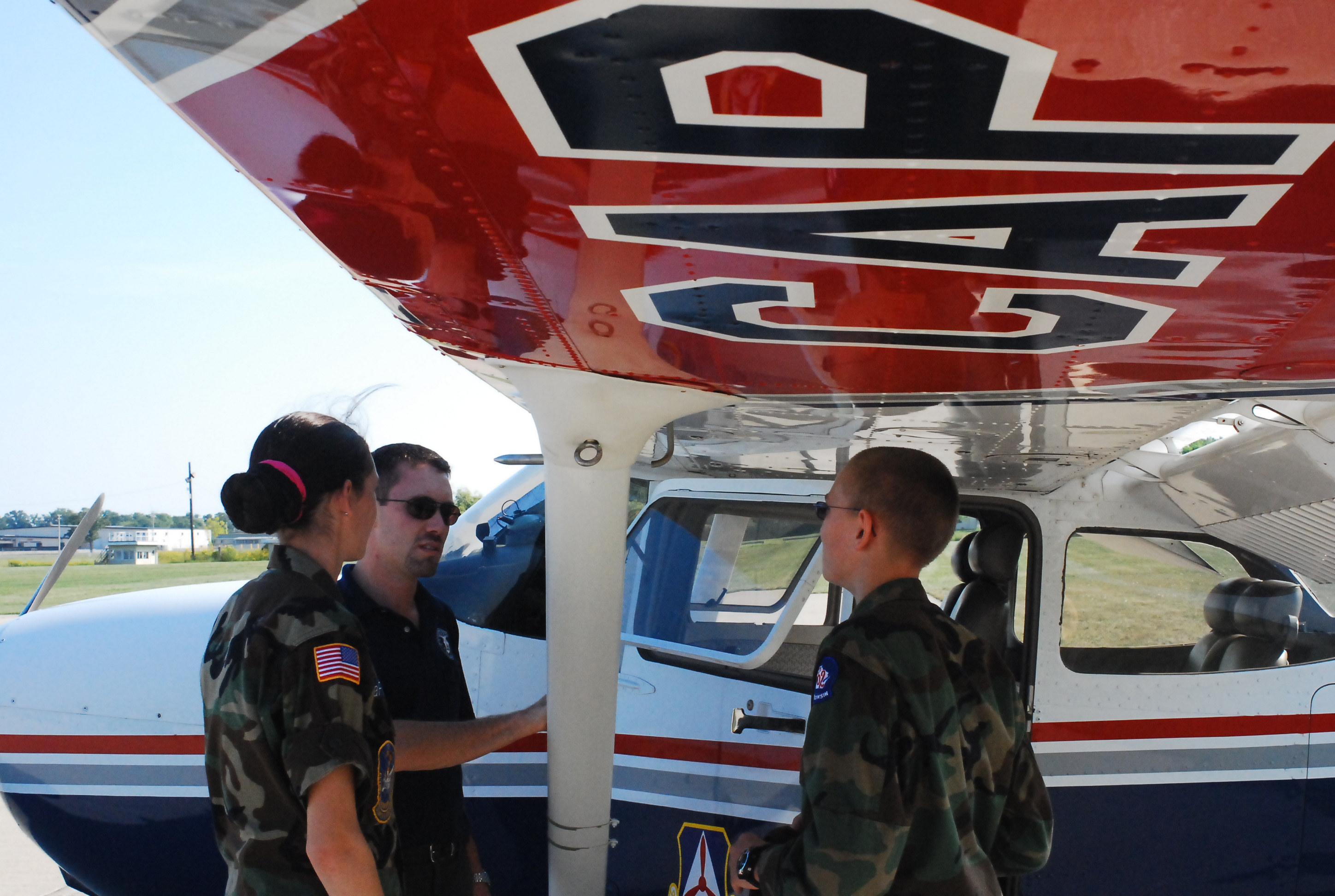
Civil Air Patrol cadets stand under the wing of a CAP aircraft at Wittman Regional Airport.

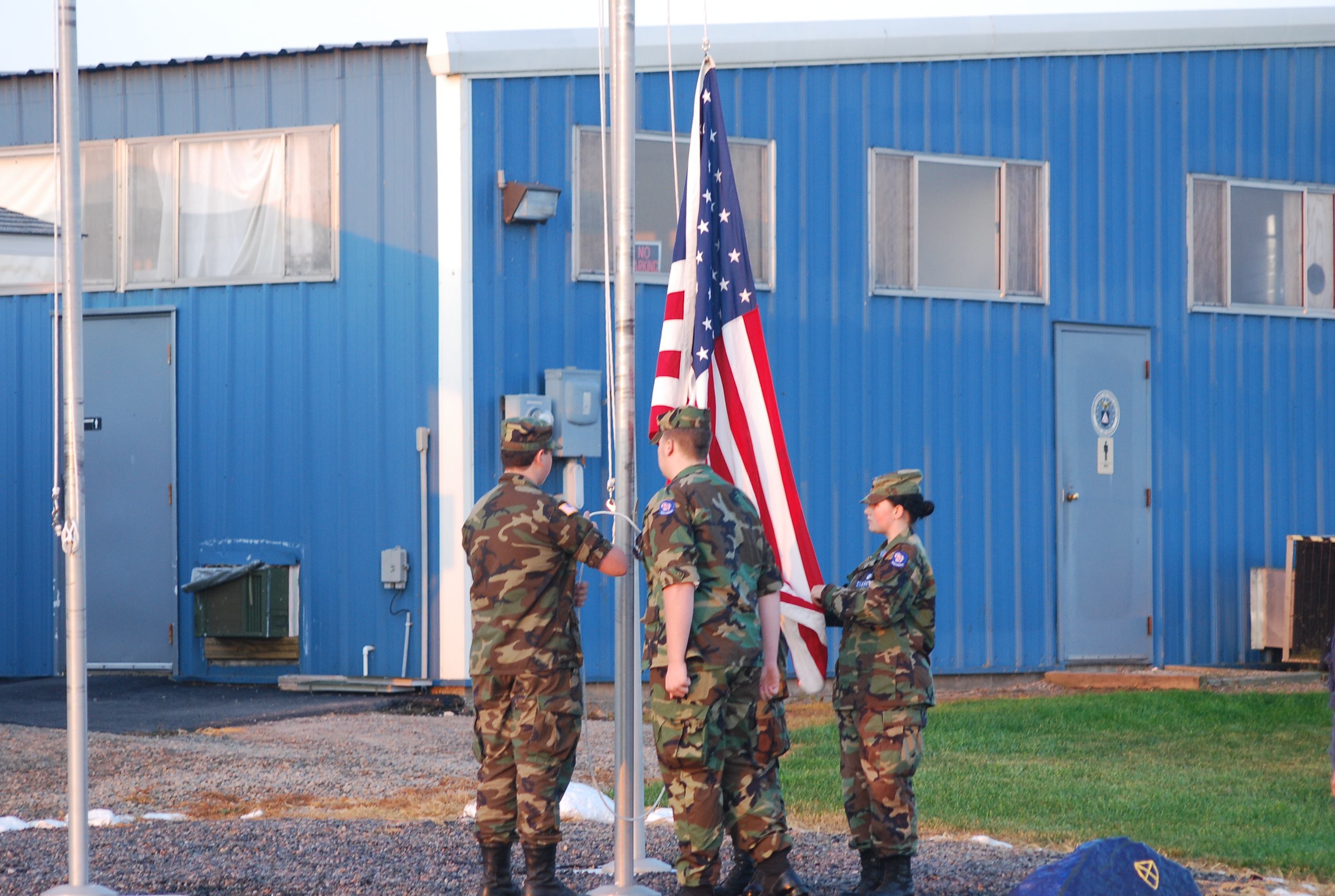
Wisconsin CAP cadets raise the American flag at Wittman Regional Airport.

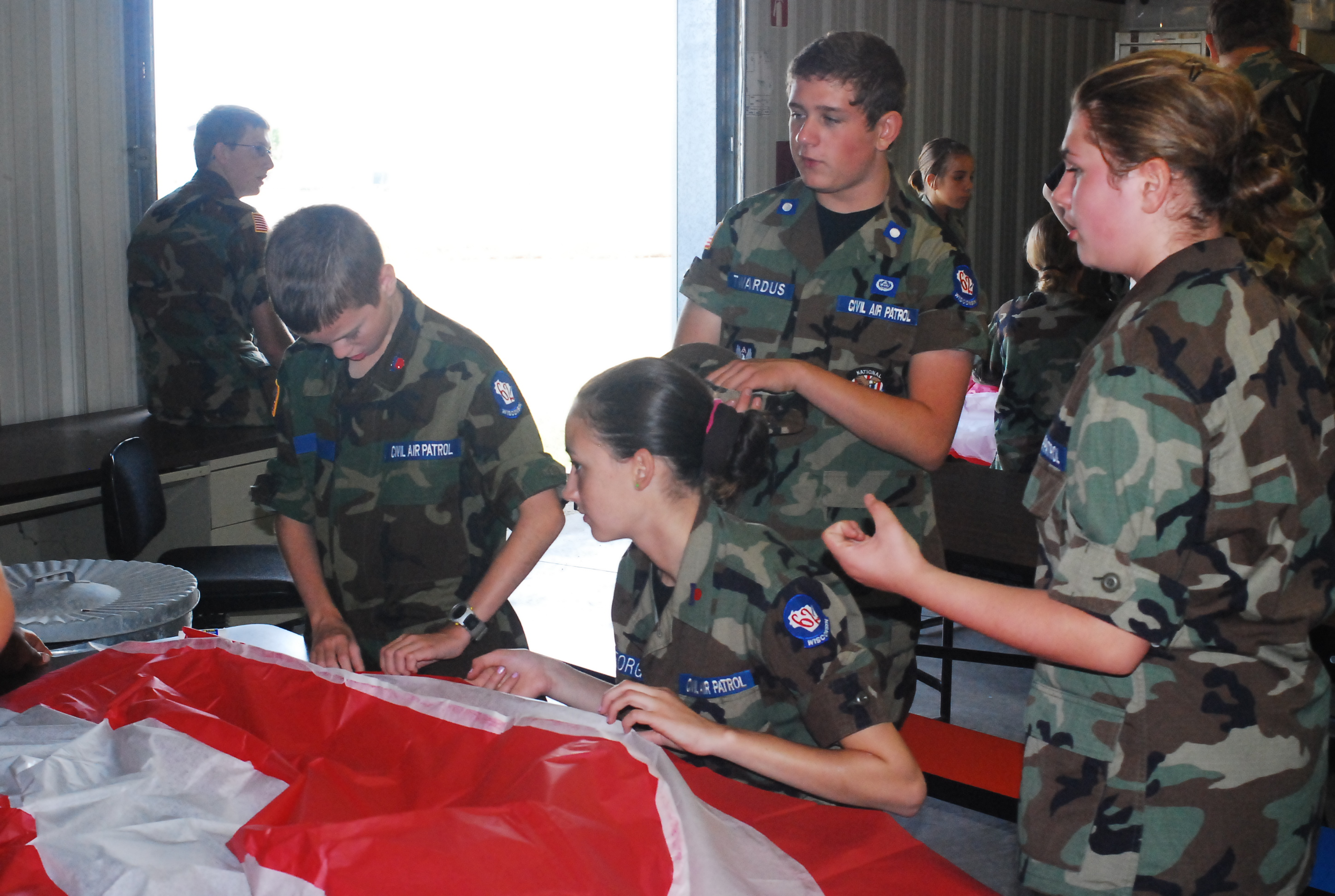
CAP cadets work together at the Wittman Regional Airport in Winnebago County, Wisconsin.

The Wisconsin Wing is divided into six groups across the state, with each squadron being assigned as a component of a group based on its geographical location.

Squadrons of the Wisconsin Wing
Group	Designation	Name	Location	Notes
	WI000	Wisconsin Wing Reserve Squadron	Madison	
North West Group	WI037	La Crosse Composite Squadron	La Crosse	
	WI053	Wild Rivers Composite Squadron	Hayward	
	WI058	R.I. Bong Senior Squadron	Superior	
	WI161	Eau Claire Composite Squadron	Eau Claire	
	WI135	Eagle River Composite Squadron	Eagle River	
North East Group	WI049	Tri-County Composite Squadron	Menominee	
	WI055	Fox Cities Composite Squadron	Appleton	
	WI183	Stevens Point Composite Squadron	Stevens Point	
	WI169	Brown County Senior Squadron	De Pere	
	WI197	Door County Composite Squadron	Sturgeon Bay	
East Central Group	WI002	Timmerman Composite Squadron	Milwaukee	
	WI013	Sheboygan Composite Squadron	Sheboygan Falls	
	WI046	West Bend Composite Squadron	West Bend	
	WI086	Milwaukee Senior Support Squadron 10	Milwaukee	
	WI144	Ozaukee Composite Squadron	Grafton	
South East Group	WI048	Waukesha Composite Squadron	Waukesha	
	WI059	Racine Senior Support Squadron	Racine	
	WI061	Milwaukee Composite Squadron 5	Milwaukee	
	WI184	Walco Composite Squadron	Elkhorn	
South West Group	WI057	Colonel R.C. Jaye Memorial Composite Squadron	Watertown	
	WI151	Green County Flight	Oregon	
	WI153	Madison Composite Squadron	Madison	

== Legal protection ==
Employers within the borders of Wisconsin are required by law to give their employees who are members of the Civil Air Patrol up to fifteen days annually (though no more than five consecutive days at a time) of unpaid leave if those employees are called to respond to an emergency as a part of the Civil Air Patrol. Employers are forbidden from discriminating against a potential employee due to their membership in the Civil Air Patrol.

== See also ==
- Awards and decorations of the Civil Air Patrol
- Wisconsin Air National Guard
- Wisconsin State Defense Force
