= Gary L. Ebben =

United States Air Force general

Brig. Gen. Gary L. Ebben
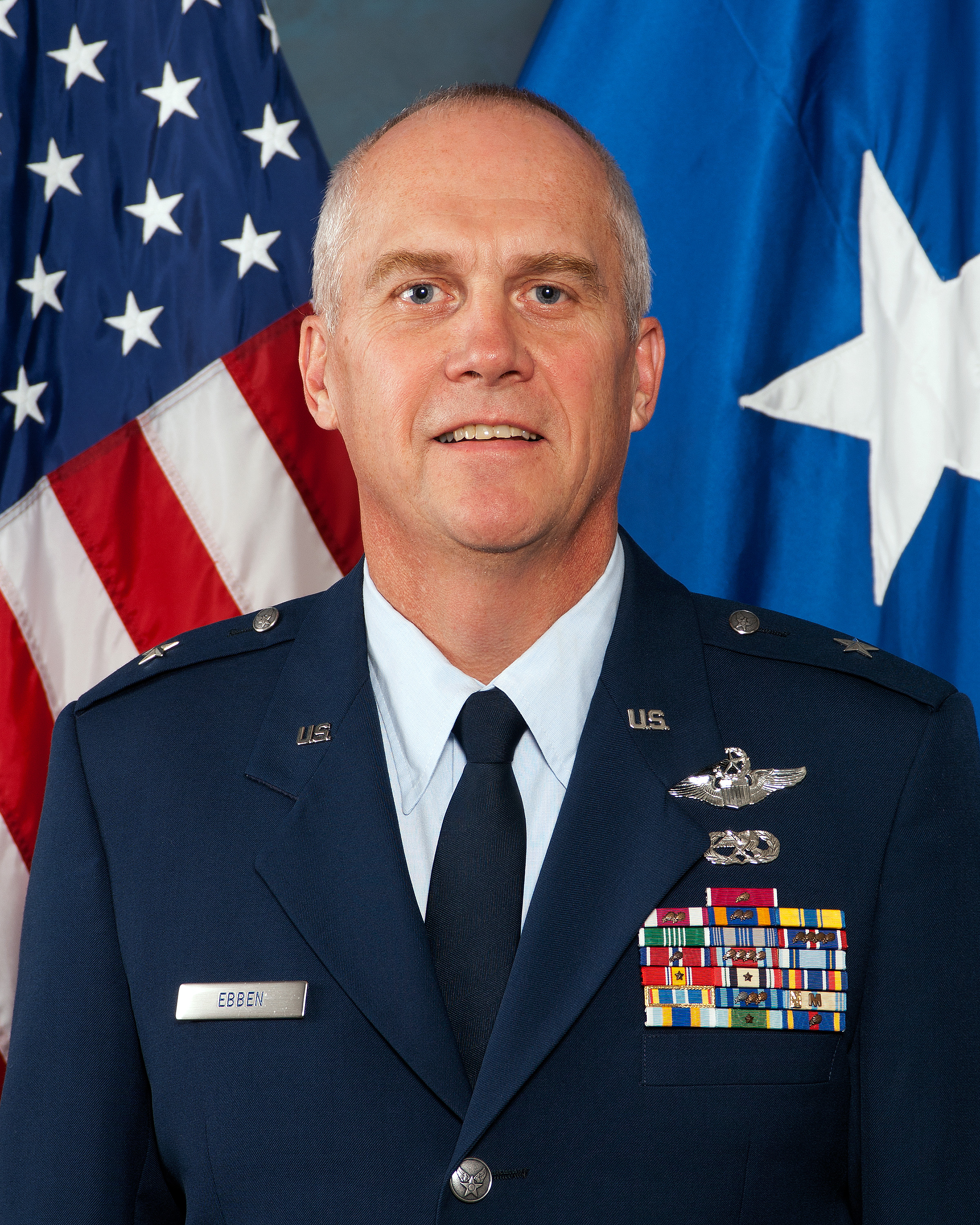
- Military career
- Allegiance: United States
- Branch: Wisconsin Air National Guard
- Service years: 1982–2020
- Rank: Brigadier general
- Commands: Interim Adjutant General of the Wisconsin National Guard, Deputy Adjutant General Wisconsin Air National Guard

Gary L. Ebben is a retired brigadier general in the Wisconsin Air National Guard. He served as the interim adjutant general of the Wisconsin National Guard prior to his retirement.

== Career ==
Ebben received his commission in 1982. He received his pilot wings at Williams Air Force Base and was stationed at Holloman Air Force Base and Barksdale Air Force Base. In 1984, he joined the 176th Tactical Fighter Squadron at Truax Field as a Fairchild Republic A-10 Thunderbolt II aircraft commander. Four years later, he became an A-10 instructor pilot with the squadron. From 1991 to 1995, he was assigned to the 128th Tactical Fighter Wing.

In 2002, Ebben became vice commander of what had been the 128th Tactical Fighter Wing, now called the 115th Fighter Wing. He remained in this position until 2008, when he became chief of staff of the Wisconsin Air National Guard. The following year, Ebben assumed command of the Combat Readiness Training Center at Volk Field Air National Guard Base. In 2012, he became assistant adjutant general – air of the Wisconsin Air National Guard.

Awards he has received include the Legion of Merit, the Meritorious Service Medal with two oak leaf clusters, the Air Medal with two oak leaf clusters, the Air Force Commendation Medal, the Army Commendation Medal, the Air Force Achievement Medal, the Outstanding Unit Award with four oak leaf clusters, the Organizational Excellence Award with oak leaf cluster, the Combat Readiness Medal with four oak leaf clusters, the Air Reserve Forces Meritorious Service Medal, the National Defense Service Medal with service star, the Iraq Campaign Medal with service star, the Global War on Terrorism Service Medal, the Air Force Expeditionary Service Ribbon with gold frame, the Air Force Longevity Service Award with silver and bronze oak leaf cluster and the Armed Forces Reserve Medal.

== Education ==
- University of Wisconsin-Madison
- Squadron Officer School
- Air Command and Staff College
- Air War College

== Dates of rank ==
Ebben received his commission and has been in the military since 1982. His current rank is brigadier general.

| Insignia | Rank | Date |
|---|---|---|
| | Second lieutenant | August 19, 1982 |
| | First lieutenant | August 19, 1984 |
| | Captain | September 8, 1986 |
| | Major | August 25, 1990 |
| | Lieutenant colonel | April 18, 1995 |
| | Colonel | March 30, 2001 |
| | Brigadier general | November 19, 2012 |
