= Matthew J. Strub =

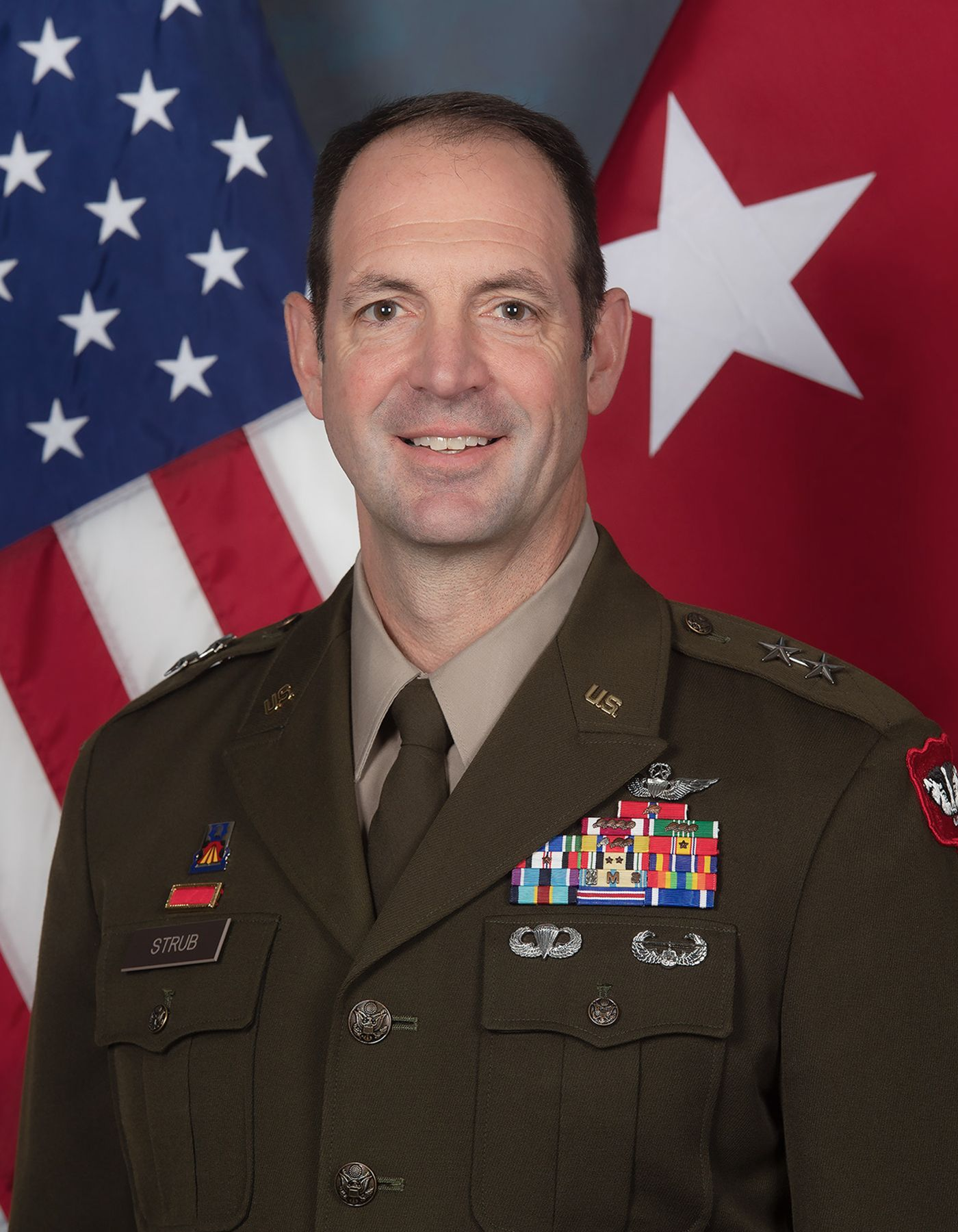

Adjutant General of Wisconsin

Personal details
- Born: Matthew J. Strub; 1969 (age 56–57)
- Education: University of Minnesota (ROTC)

Military service
- Allegiance: United States of America
- Branch/service: United States Army Reserve (1986 - 1995); Wisconsin Army National Guard (1995 - Present)
- Years of service: 1986 - Present
- Commands: 641st Troop Command Battalion; 147th Aviation Regiment (1st Battalion); 1st Combat Aviation Brigade

Matthew J. Strub is a Major General in the United States Army and the Adjutant General of the Wisconsin National Guard.

== Career ==
Matthew J. Strub originally enlisted in the U.S. Army in 1986 and was commissioned as an officer four years later. He went on to join the Wisconsin Army National Guard in 1995. Throughout his career he has commanded the 641st Troop Command Battalion, the 1st Battalion of the 147th Aviation Regiment, and was deputy commander of the Combat Aviation Brigade, 1st Infantry Division.

Strub was deployed to serve in the Iraq War and the War in Afghanistan, as well as for relief in the aftermath of Hurricane Katrina. In 2025, he was appointed as the Adjutant General of Wisconsin by Governor Tony Evers. Decorations Strub has received include the Bronze Star Medal with oak leaf cluster, the Meritorious Service Medal with three oak leaf clusters,the Army Commendation Medal with three oak leaf clusters and the Army Achievement Medal.
