= Wisconsin Army National Guard =

Component of the US Army and military of the U.S. state of Wisconsin

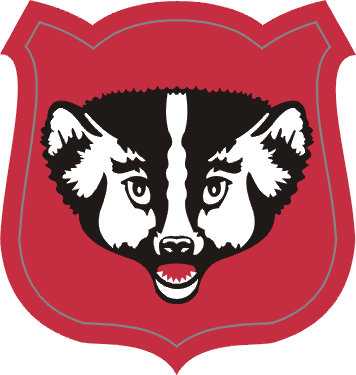
- Shoulder sleeve insignia of the Wisconsin Army National Guard
- Active: 1879–present
- Country: United States
- Allegiance: Wisconsin
- Branch: Army National Guard
- Size: 7,198
- Motto: Forward
- Mascot: Badger

Commanders
- Commander in Chief: Governor Tony Evers
- Adjutant General: Major General Matthew J. Strub
- Deputy Adjutant General - Army: Brigadier General Brion J. Aderman

Insignia
- Wisconsin Army National Guard Crest

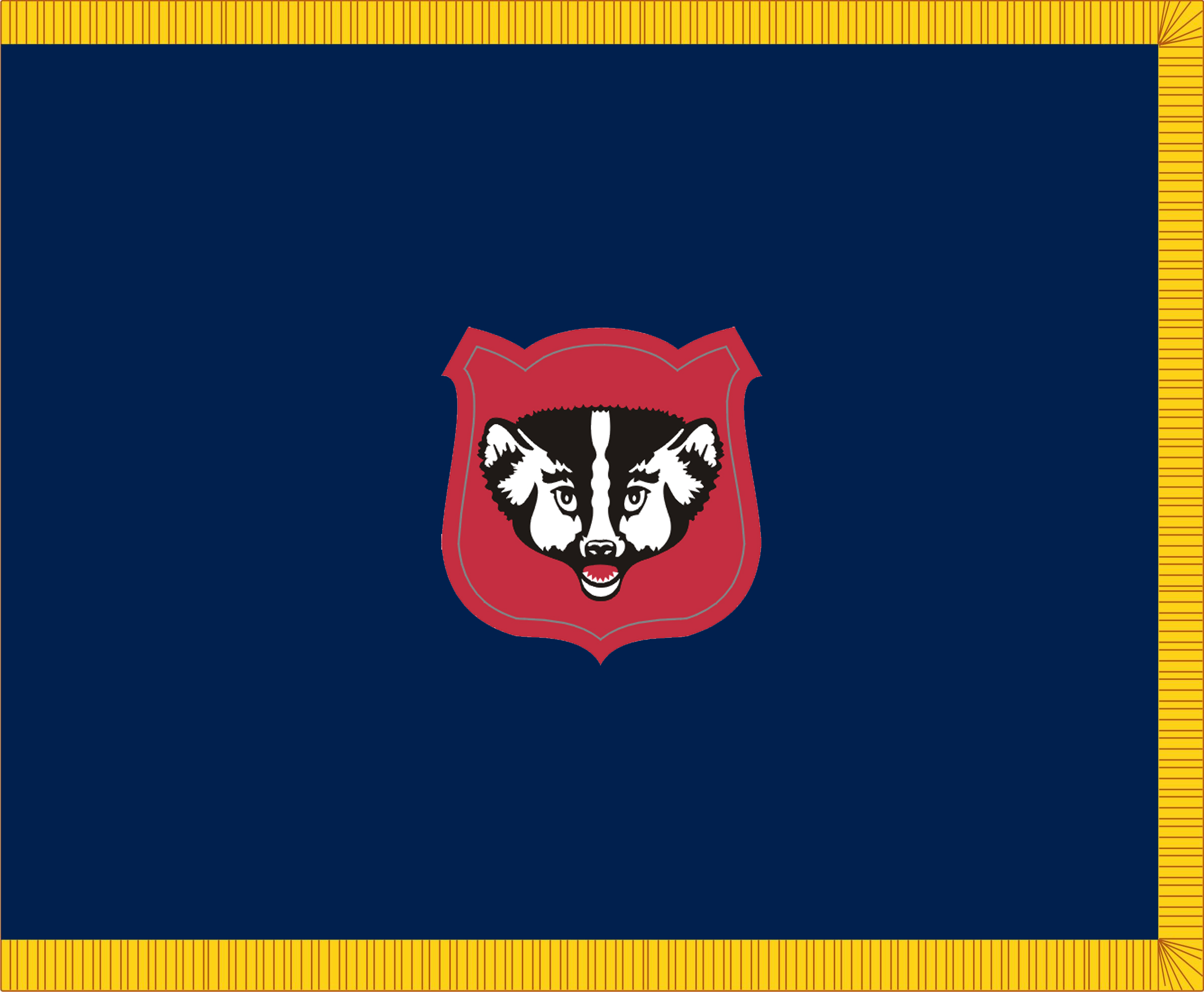
- Wisconsin Army National Guard Headquarters Flag

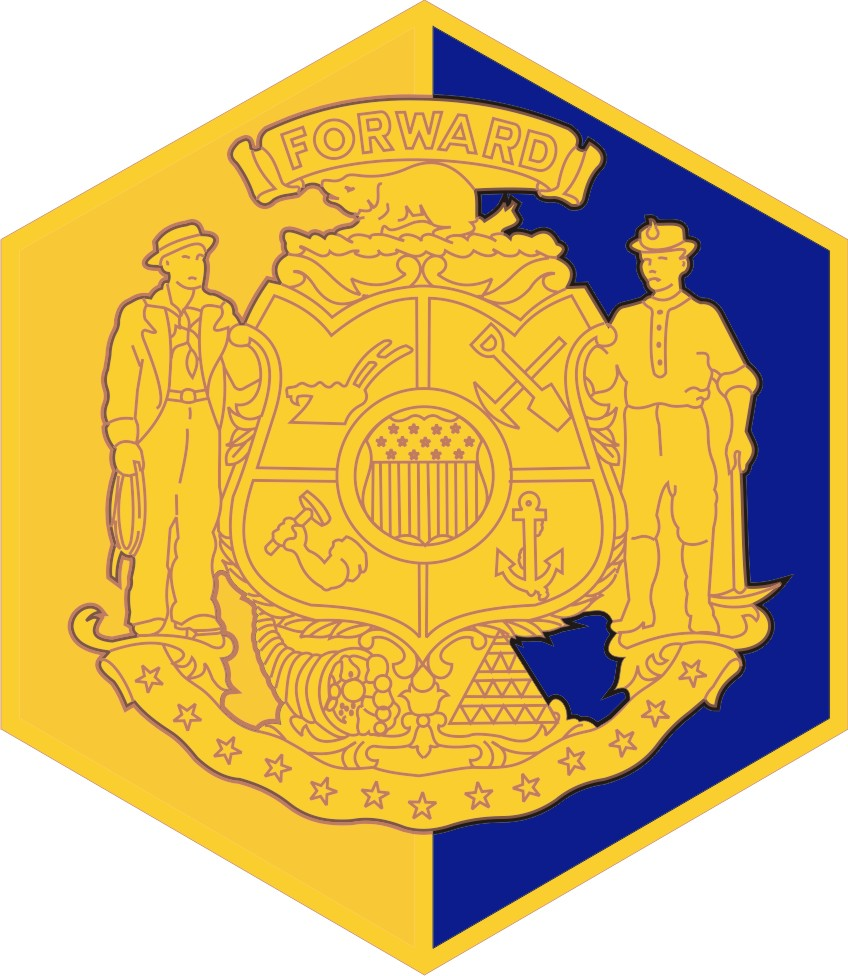
- Wisconsin Army National Guard STARC DUI

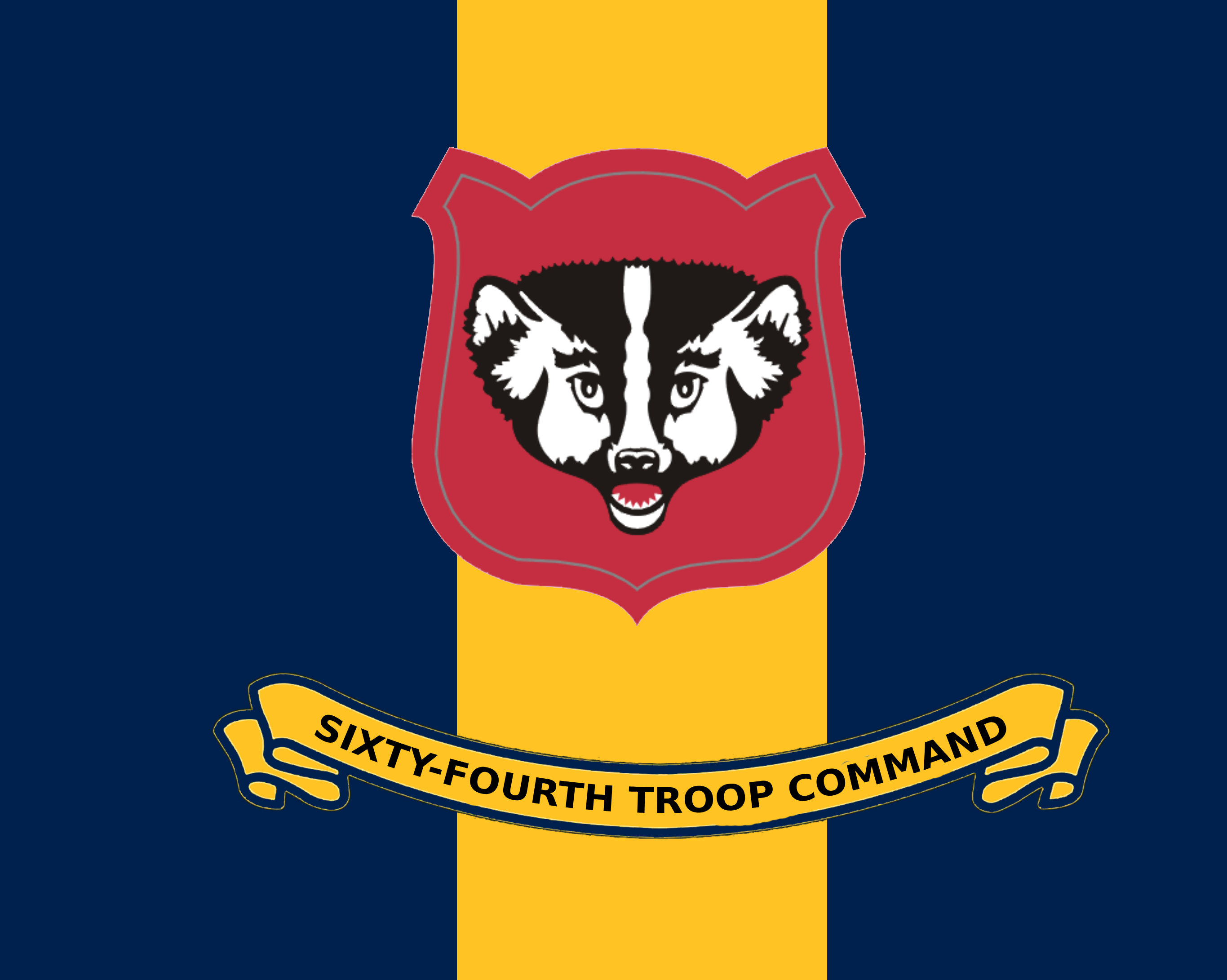
- Wisconsin Army National Guard 64th Troop Command Flag

The Wisconsin Army National Guard has dual state and federal roles, and is jointly funded and maintained by both governments. Its federal mission is to provide trained units to the United States Army in time of war or national emergency. Its state mission is to help civil authorities protect life and property and preserve peace, order, and public safety in times of natural or human-caused emergencies. The governor, who is the commander in chief of the Guard when it is not activated for federal service, appoints the adjutant general who directs the Wisconsin Department of Military Affairs, of which the Guard is a part. Members of the National Guard are typically part-time soldiers who attend unit drills one weekend per month and serve a two-week annual tour of active duty. All officers and enlisted personnel must meet the same physical, education, and other eligibility requirements as members of the active-duty services.

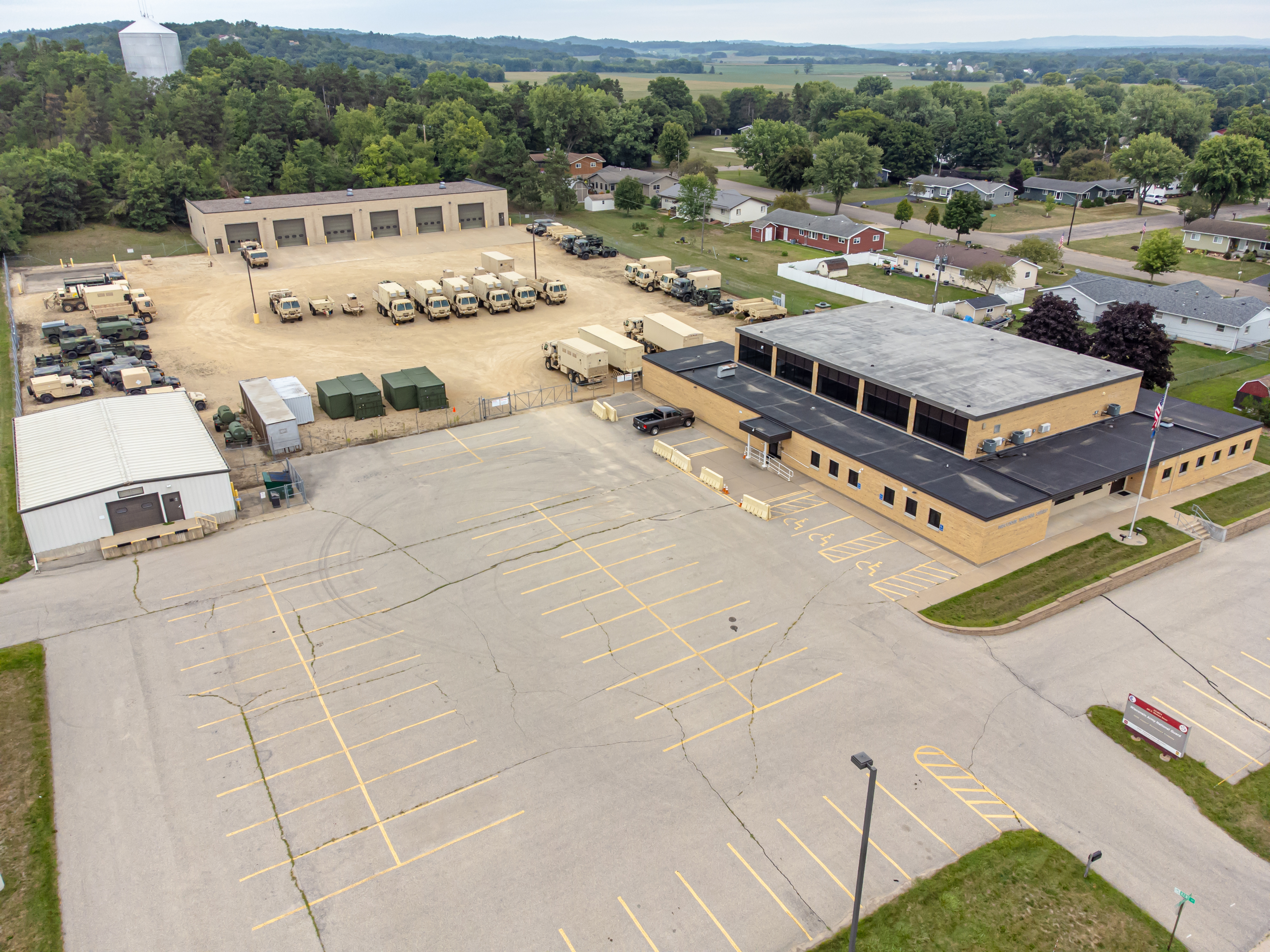
Sparta, Wisconsin

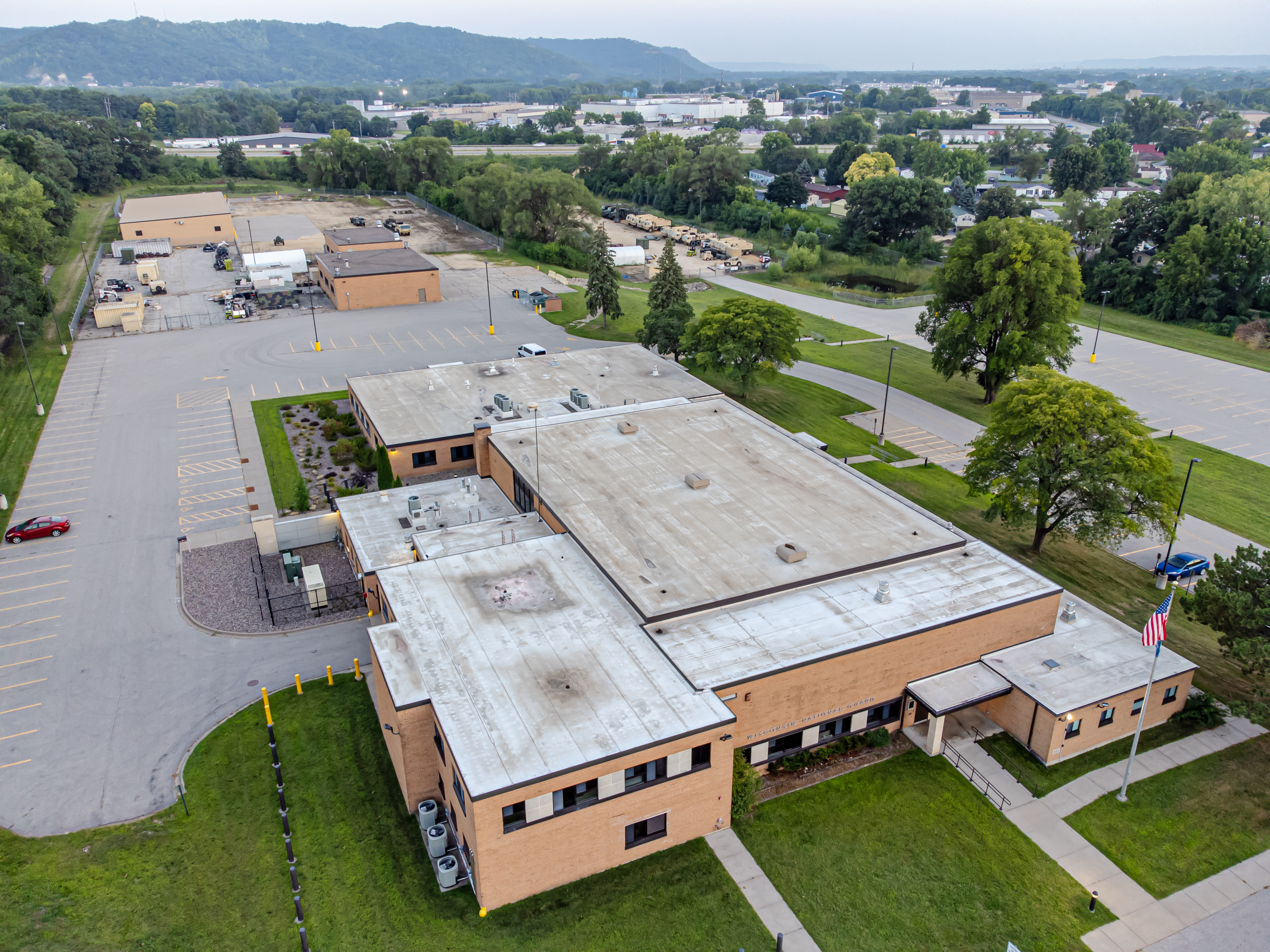
Onalaska, Wisconsin

Wisconsin Army National Guard facilities

== History ==
In 1848, the first session of the Wisconsin Legislature provided for the distribution of federal arms and military equipment. Wisconsin Guard troops fought in the Civil War, the Spanish–American War, both the First and Second World Wars, and the Korean War. Guard members have been activated on numerous other occasions, including for the Berlin Crisis, the Persian Gulf War, peacekeeping operations in the Balkans, and current operations in Afghanistan and Iraq.

=== Pre–World War I ===
Charge of the Iron Brigade, ancestor to the 32nd Infantry Division, at the Battle of Antietam, 17 September 1862

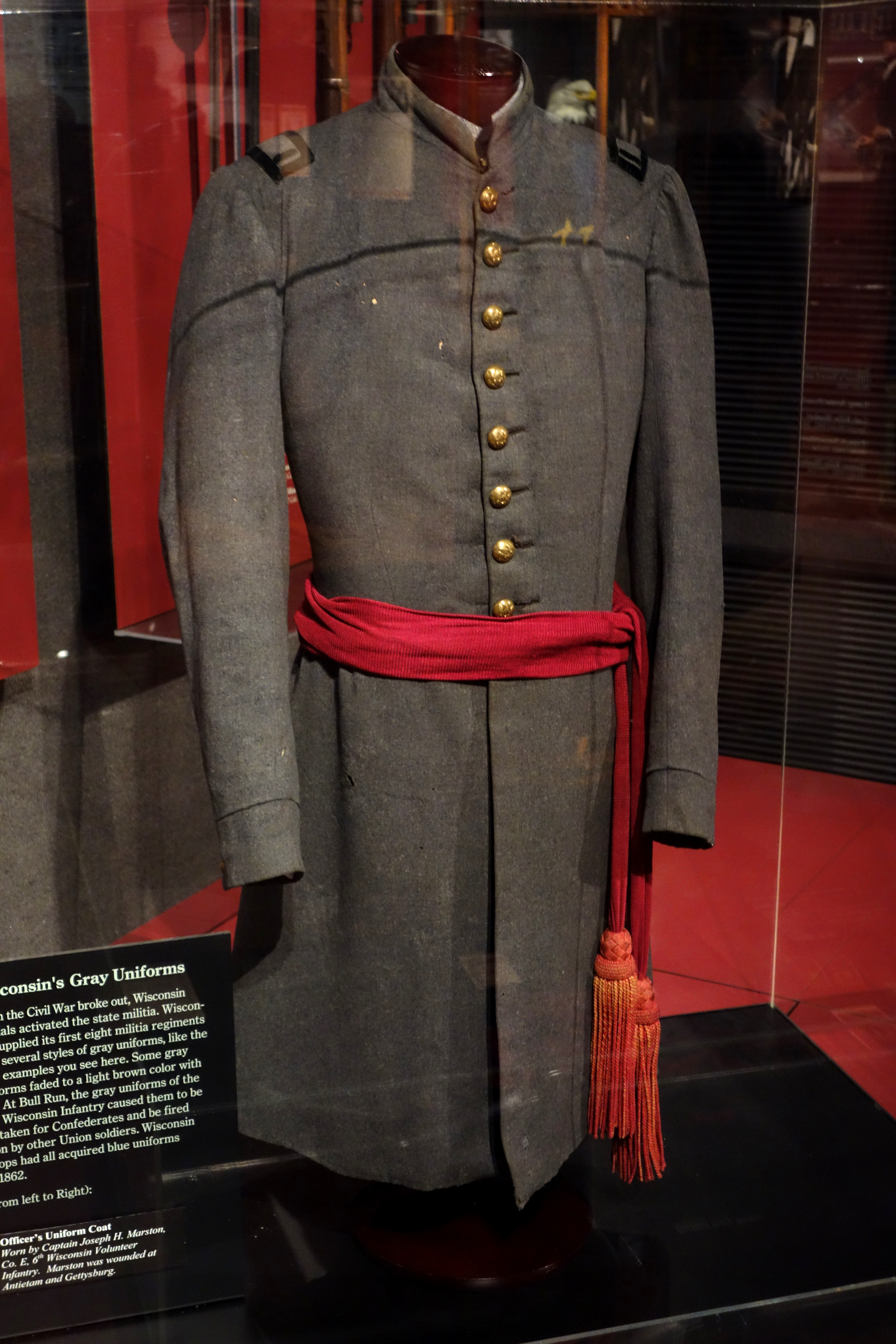
Wisconsin State Militia, Civil War Officer's Uniform.

Called the State Militia until 1879, the Wisconsin National Guard was appointed by the first adjutant general of the Wisconsin Territory in 1839. The modern history of the division originated in the spring of 1861 with the 1st Battalion, 128th Infantry and the 2nd Regiment, 1st Wisconsin Cavalry. They were made up of independent companies recruited from throughout Wisconsin and was organized and activated into Federal service. The 2nd Wisconsin was joined by several other regiments to form the famous Iron Brigade, which soon became one of the most feared and respected units on either side in the Civil War for its performance in such battles as Antietam and Gettysburg. It was nicknamed the Iron Jaw Division for its toughness in combat.

The 4th Infantry Battalion, Wisconsin National Guard, was organized on 25 April 1884 from Milwaukee companies. They were expanded and in 1890 redesignated as the 4th Infantry Regiment which was activated for Federal service in the war with Spain. They were reorganized on 10 June 1899 as the 1st, 2nd, and 3rd Infantry Regiments in the Wisconsin National Guard.

In 1916, Troop A was stationed at the Mexican border under General John Pershing to guard against the raiding Mexican General Pancho Villa during the Pancho Villa Expedition. Troop B was ordered to Camp Wilson near San Diego, California, and on arrival were assigned as the Divisional Headquarters Troop of the 12th Provisional Division until the final breaking up of that division.

The 1st, 2nd, and 3rd Infantry Regiments were mustered into Federal service on 30 June 1916 for Mexican Border service. The Guard unit's Troop A and Troop B were mustered out of Federal Service on 20 October 1916 and 6 March 1917, respectively. The regiments were mustered out at Fort Sheridan, Illinois, on 19 January 1917 (1st), 28 February 1917 (2nd), and 14 December 1916 (3rd).

=== World War I ===
When the United States declared war on Germany on 11 April 1917, the Wisconsin Adjutant General ordered the Milwaukee Troops to add a squadron, and Troop C and Troop D were added. The Guard units' Troop A and Troop B had been mustered out of Federal Service less than a year earlier on 20 October 1916 and 6 March 1917, respectively. The Adjutant General then directed the unit to add a new regiment, and the Second and Third Squadrons were formed as the First Wisconsin Cavalry, with units organized in various cities. Troop E commanded by Captain John S. Coney was formed in Kenosha on 10 May 1917, and the Wisconsin Cavalry was officially formed on 29 May 1917.

Only two months later, the 32nd Division was activated in July 1917 at Camp MacArthur, Waco, Texas of National Guard units from Wisconsin and Michigan. Wisconsin furnished approximately 15,000 men, and another 8,000 troops came from Michigan. The division was made up of the 125th and 126th Infantry Regiments (63rd Infantry Brigade) and the 127th and 128th Infantry Regiments (64th Infantry Brigade), as well as three artillery regiments within the 57th Field Artillery Brigade. On 4 August 1917, Battery F, 121st Field Artillery regiment was the first unit to arrive at Camp MacArthur. The remainder arrived as soon as trains could be mustered for transportation.

While the Wisconsin National Guard was deployed abroad, the Wisconsin State Guard was organized to temporarily replace the Wisconsin National Guard as the designated militia of Wisconsin and to assume the duties of the National Guard units until the National Guard units returned.

== Structure ==
There are currently about 9,600 members in the Wisconsin National Guard. They reside in all of the state's 72 counties, ranging from fewer than ten in several lightly populated counties in the northeastern part of the state to about 1,100 each in Dane and Milwaukee counties. Over 600 live in other states, with 70 percent of those residing in Illinois and Minnesota. The approximately 7,400 Army Guard soldiers train in armories located in 67 communities throughout the state. Most of the units are assigned to one of three major commands: the 32nd Infantry Brigade, headquartered at Camp Douglas; the 64th Troop Command, headquartered at Madison; and the 157th Maneuver Enhancement Brigade, headquartered at Milwaukee, Wisconsin. In addition, the 426th Regiment (Regional Training Institute) is also active, heir to the traditions of the 426th Infantry Regiment.

=== 32nd Infantry Brigade Combat Team ===
The 32nd Infantry Brigade is the largest unit in the Wisconsin National Guard. Formed in 1967 from the inactivated 32nd Infantry Division, the Red Arrow Brigade consists of three battalions of light infantry, one squadron of cavalry, as well as support and engineer units.

=== 157th Maneuver Enhancement Brigade ===
The 157th Maneuver Enhancement Brigade is based at Milwaukee, Wisconsin. It was formed from the inactivated 57th Field Artillery Brigade and 264th Engineer Group.

=== 64th Troop Command ===
The 64th Troop Command provides administrative, training and logistical support to unique, specialized or smaller Wisconsin Army National Guard units that are not part of other major deployable units. The command includes aviation, sustainment and support, personnel, CBRN, band, transportation, maintenance, public affairs, rear area operations command, and medical units.

== Historic units ==
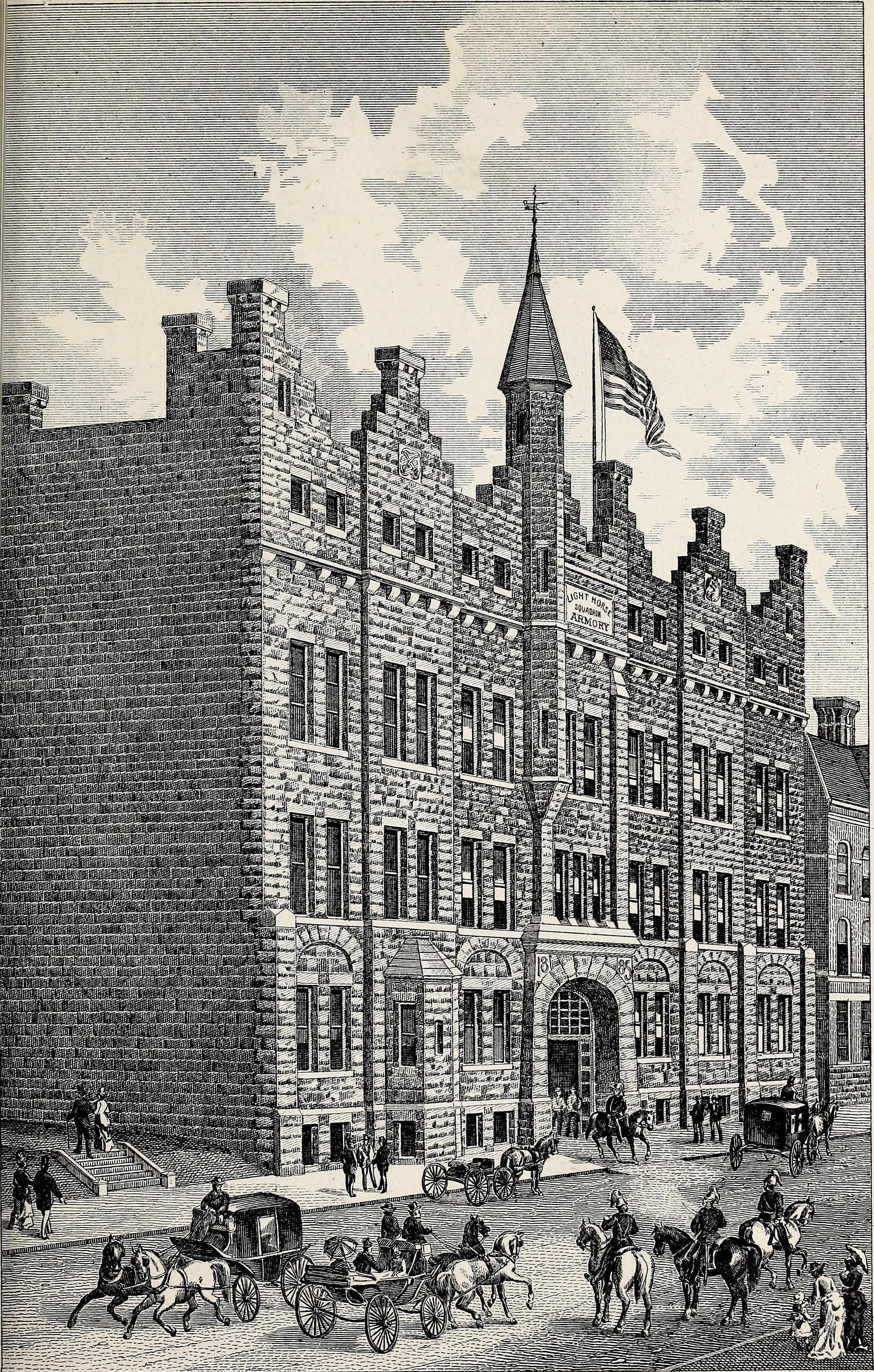
The Light Horse Squadron Armory (State Arsenal) in Milwaukee, 1893

- 127th Infantry Regiment
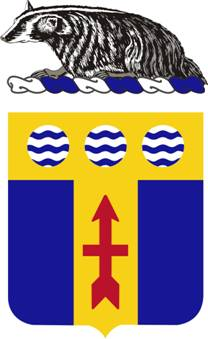
- 128th Infantry Regiment
- 120th Field Artillery Regiment
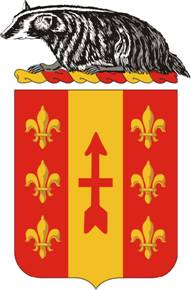
- 121st Field Artillery Regiment
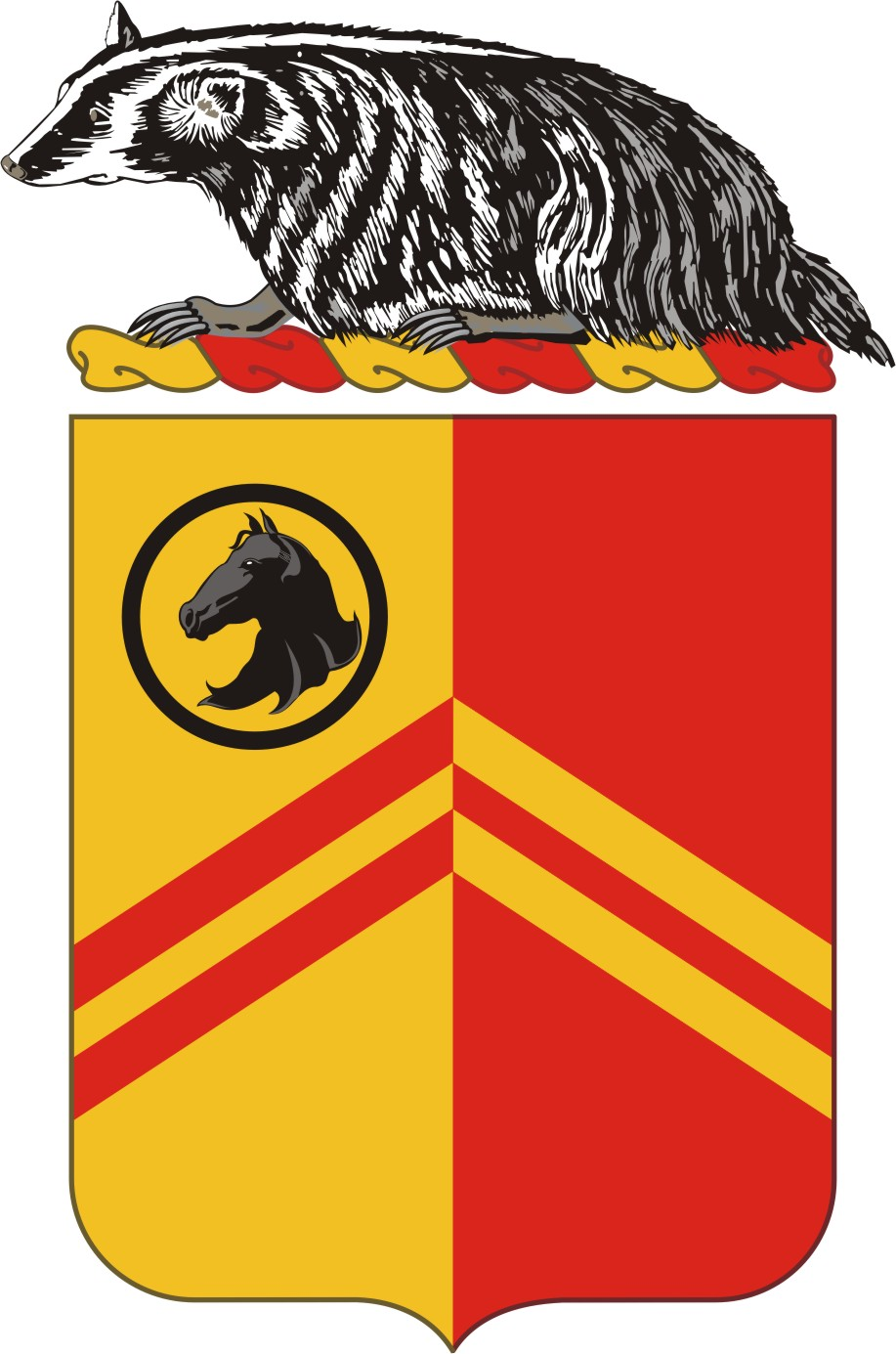
- 126th Field Artillery Regiment

== See also ==
- Wisconsin State Defense Force
