= Donald P. Dunbar =

United States Air Force general

Maj. Gen. Donald P. Dunbar
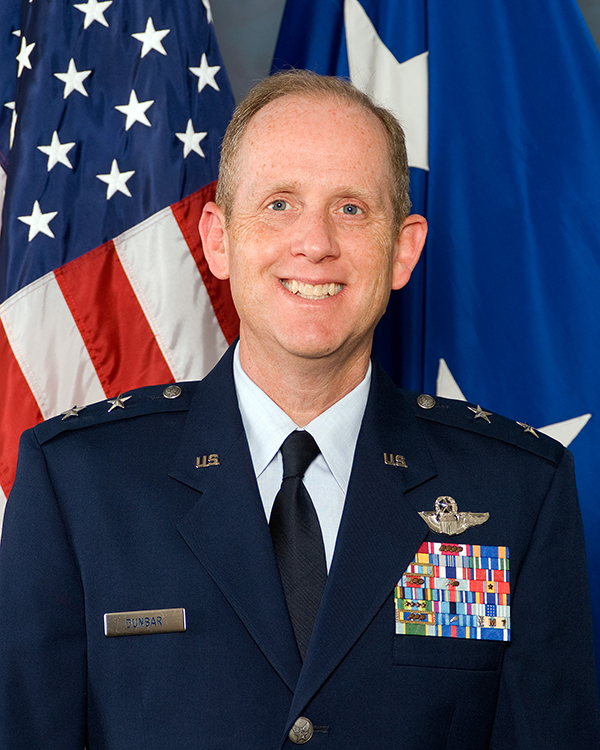
- Military career
- Allegiance: United States
- Branch: Wisconsin Air National Guard
- Service years: 1983–2019
- Rank: Major general
- Commands: Adjutant General of the Wisconsin National Guard
- Awards: Legion of Merit

Major General Donald P. Dunbar is Wisconsin's former Adjutant General. He commanded the Wisconsin National Guard and is in the United States Air National Guard. Dunbar was responsible for Emergency Management in the state. He also served as Wisconsin's Homeland Security Advisor, chairs the Homeland Security Council, and served as the senior state official for cyber matters. Dunbar also served on the executive committees of the Governor's Homeland Security Advisors Council (GHSAC) and the Adjutants General Association of the United States (AGAUS), and is a member of the Federal Emergency Management Agency (FEMA) National Advisory Council. With the retirement of Major General Thaddeus J. Martin of the Connecticut National Guard on June 30, 2018, General Dunbar became the longest serving Adjutant General in the United States. At the request of Governor Tony Evers, Dunbar resigned his post in the Wisconsin National Guard on December 9, 2019, for intentionally ignoring orders requiring outside investigations into claims of sexual assault and harassment as required by state and federal law and U.S. Department of Defense regulations.

== Career ==
Dunbar joined the Air Force in August 1983 and trained at Reese Air Force Base. Later he would compile over 3,000 flying hours, flying in a Boeing B-52 Stratofortress, Boeing KC-135 Stratotanker, Fairchild C-26 Metroliner, McDonnell Douglas DC-10, Cessna T-37 Tweet, Northrop T-38 Talon, and Cessna T-41 Mescalero. He first came to Wisconsin in March 2005 to command the 128th Air Refueling Wing of the Wisconsin Air National Guard. Following a tour of duty in the Iraq War, Dunbar was named Adjutant General of Wisconsin by Jim Doyle in 2007.

Dunbar was asked to resign in December 2019 by Governor Evers after a scathing federal report found the Wisconsin National Guard had been grossly mishandling soldiers' sexual assault and harassment complaints for years. In particular, Paul Fisk, the chair of the American Legion Wisconsin's legislative council stated that the incidents in which brought about the report "...shows a lack of leadership on the part of the military structure." Investigators further discovered that Dunbar was actively violating the same federal laws by continuing to launch internal investigations of sexual misconduct as he was being investigated for such violations.

In 2023, the federal government sued (and came to a resolution) with the Wisconsin Department of Military Affairs for a 2016 glaring violation of Title VII regarding pay discrimination on the basis of sex. Dunbar had offered a salary below the posted salary range to a highly qualified female candidate (the most qualified candidate) for a position within Wisconsin Emergency Management. This was 11% below that of the outgoing male employee in that position. After the woman turned down the position and it was reposted, Dunbar offered three men in succession more than $8,000 more than the woman, all three being less qualified than her.

Awards Dunbar has received include the Legion of Merit, the Meritorious Service Medal with four oak leaf clusters, the Air Medal, the Air Force Commendation Medal, the Air Force Achievement Medal, the Army Achievement Medal, the Joint Meritorious Unit Award, the Meritorious Unit Award, the Air Force Organization Excellence Award the Combat Readiness Medal with one silver oak leaf cluster and two bronze oak leaf clusters, the Air Force Recognition Ribbon, the National Defense Service Medal with service star, the Armed Forces Expeditionary Medal with two service stars, the Global War on Terrorism Expeditionary Medal, the Global War on Terrorism Service Medal, the Armed Forces Service Medal with four bronze service stars, the Humanitarian Service Medal, the Air Force Overseas Ribbon, the Air Force Expeditionary Service Ribbon with gold border and three oak leaf clusters, the Air Force Longevity Service Award with oak leaf cluster, the Armed Forces Reserve Medal with hourglass device and mobilization device with a 7 award numeral, the Small Arms Expert Marksmanship Ribbon, the Air Force Training Ribbon, and the NATO Medal.

== Education ==
- B.D., College of Insurance
- M.B.A., City University of Seattle
- J.D., University of Maryland School of Law
- Distinguished Graduate, Squadron Officer School
- Graduate, Air Command and Staff College
- Distinguished Graduate, National War College
- M.S., National War College
- Fellow, CAPSTONE Military Leadership Program

== Dates of rank ==
From 1984 to present, Dunbar has achieved eight different rank promotions.

| Insignia | Rank | Date |
|---|---|---|
| | Second lieutenant | January 13, 1984 |
| | First lieutenant | January 12, 1986 |
| | Captain | January 12, 1988 |
| | Major | April 1, 1996 |
| | Lieutenant colonel | April 3, 2000 |
| | Colonel | February 27, 2004 |
| | Brigadier general | August 1, 2008 |
| | Major general | August 5, 2010 |
