= Wisconsin State Defense Force =

- The shoulder patch worn by Wisconsin State Guard soldiers during World War II.
- Active: 1917 - 1945
- Country: United States
- Allegiance: Wisconsin
- Type: State defense force
- Role: Military reserve force

Commanders
- Civilian leadership: Governor of Wisconsin

The Wisconsin State Defense Force (WSDF) is the currently inactive state defense force of the State of Wisconsin authorized by Wisconsin law. As a state defense force, the Wisconsin State Defense Force, alongside the Wisconsin National Guard, is organized under the Wisconsin Department of Military Affairs as a part of the military forces of Wisconsin. However, unlike the National Guard, the State Defense Force is a purely state-controlled organization and cannot be deployed outside the state of Wisconsin. When any part of the Wisconsin National Guard is called into service of the United States, the adjutant general (who is appointed by the governor) may recruit volunteers to the WSDF to serve within the borders of Wisconsin.

== History ==
=== Wisconsin home guards ===
The military of the United States during the American Civil War was composed of a smaller professional army supported by various state militia volunteer units. Wisconsin provided multiple units to fight in the war. Initially, the War Department only requested one volunteer regiment from Wisconsin, leaving thousands of men eager to serve militarily but unable to enter the war until much later as the conflict continued longer than the federal government had anticipated. The desire of these men to serve, along with a fear of domestic unrest caused by Confederate sympathizers, caused the Wisconsin Legislature and Governor Louis P. Harvey to create a legal framework for local militia companies to organize, drill, and serve as a home guard unit capable of handling state emergencies.

=== World War I ===
During World War I, when the National Guard was federalized and deployed, the state of Wisconsin created a state guard of volunteers, officially titled the Wisconsin State Guard. Members of the Wisconsin State Guard served solely as state soldiers, unlike members of the National Guard who had dual federal and state responsibilities. While the Wisconsin State Guard could not be federalized, individual members of the guard were still eligible to be drafted into federal service. Many of those who first served in the Wisconsin State Guard were inducted into the federal military at a higher rank than those enlisted who had not served any state duty. Unlike many other state defense forces, the Wisconsin State Guard was trained and equipped by the state of Wisconsin rather than relying on the War Department for donated surplus equipment. The Wisconsin State Guard consisted of several infantry regiments and drilled at National Guard bases across the state, including Camp Douglas.

=== World War II ===
The Wisconsin State Guard was again called into service during World War II for homeland security purposes while the Wisconsin National Guard was deployed abroad.

== Legal status ==
State defense forces are authorized by the federal government under Title 32, Section 109 of the United States Code. Wisconsin law also allows the governor to reactivate the Wisconsin State Defense Force at any time when any part of the Wisconsin National Guard is called into federal service. Therefore, the WSDF can be reactivated either by an act of legislature or by an executive order by the Governor of Wisconsin.

== Legal protection ==
Under Wisconsin law, members of the state defense force who are activated during an emergency are guaranteed a leave of absence from their place of employment, and must be reinstated to their former position when their deployment ends, without loss of pay, seniority, health insurance coverage, or other benefits.

== See also ==
- Wisconsin Department of Military Affairs
- Wisconsin Naval Militia
- Wisconsin Wing Civil Air Patrol
