= Wisconsin National Guard =

Militia of the U.S. state of Wisconsin

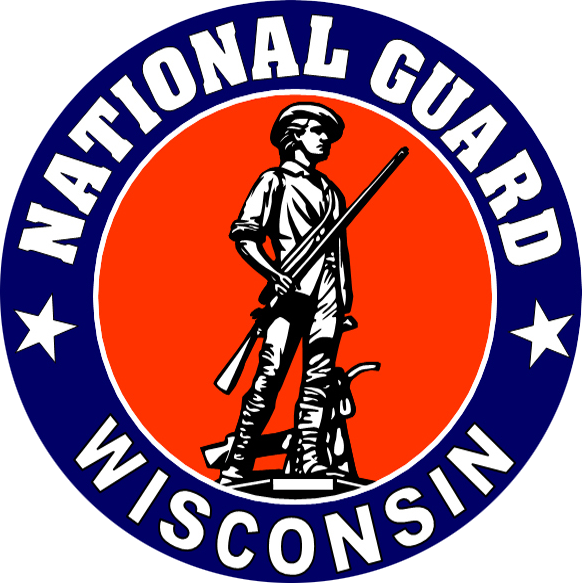
- Seal of the Wisconsin National Guard
- Active: 1848-Present
- Country: United States
- Allegiance: Wisconsin
- Type: Militia
- Size: 7,198 (Army National Guard); 1,944 (Air National Guard)
- Headquarters: Madison, WI

Commanders
- Governor and Commander-in-Chief: Tony Evers
- Adjutant General: Brigadier General David W. May (interim)

The Wisconsin National Guard consists of the Wisconsin Army National Guard and the Wisconsin Air National Guard. It is a part of the government of Wisconsin under the control of the Wisconsin Department of Military Affairs. The Wisconsin National Guard dates back to 1848 when it was commissioned by the State as the "Wisconsin State Militia". In 1879, the organization's name was changed to its current title.

== Adjutant general ==
The interim adjutant general is Brigadier General David W. May. On June 6, 2024, Major General Paul E. Knapp resigned. Knapp had previously assumed command from interim Adjutants General Brigadier General Joane K. Mathews and Brigadier General Gary L. Ebben. Ebben took command from Major General Donald P. Dunbar following the latter's resignation after a federal report found he had "willfully ignored sexual assault allegations" in the Wisconsin National Guard. Prior to the change in command, Ebben was the deputy adjutant for the Wisconsin Air National Guard. He continued this role concurrently with the interim position. Major General Dunbar had been the state adjutant general since 2007.

== Gallery ==
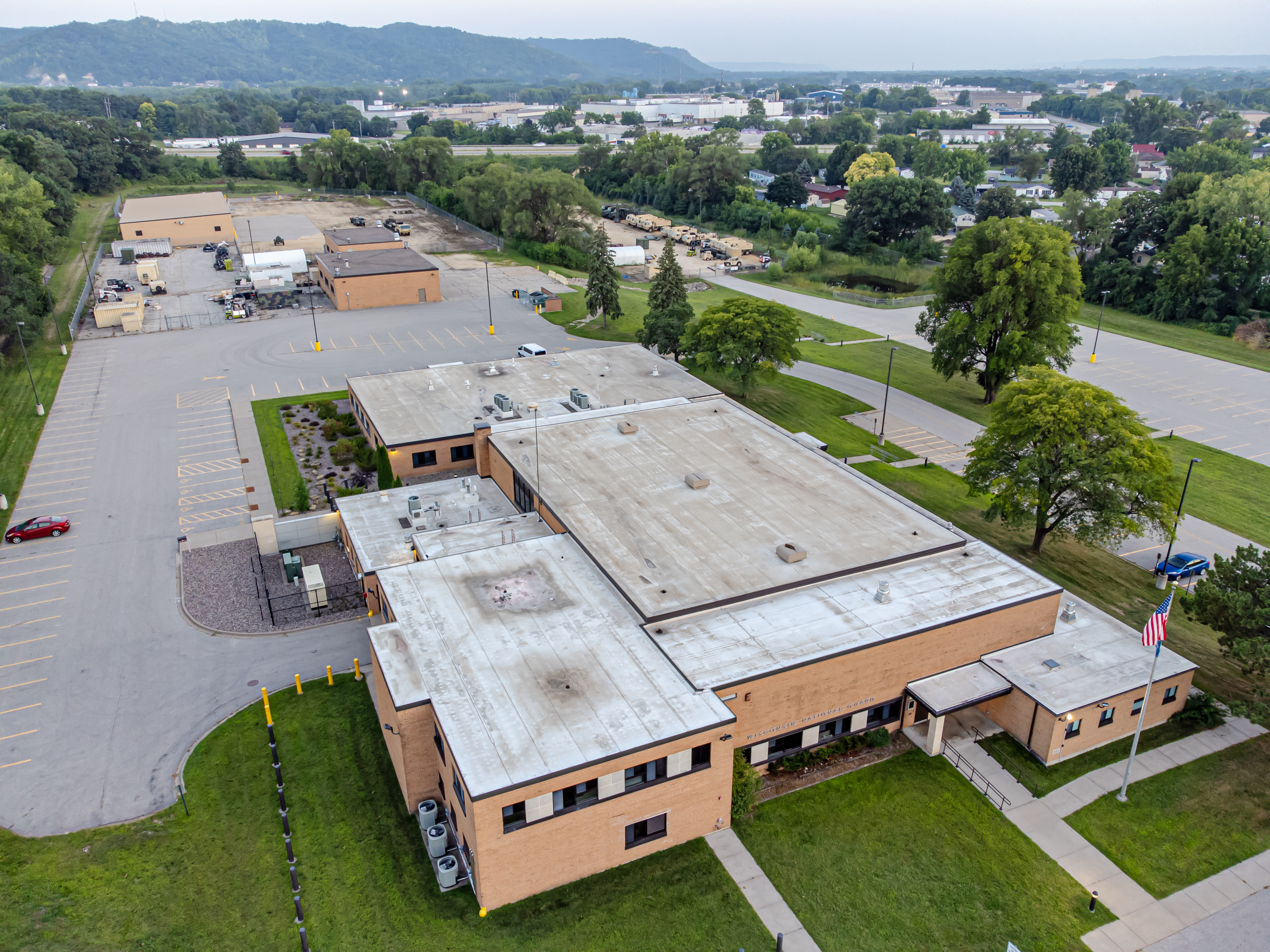
National Guard in Onalaska

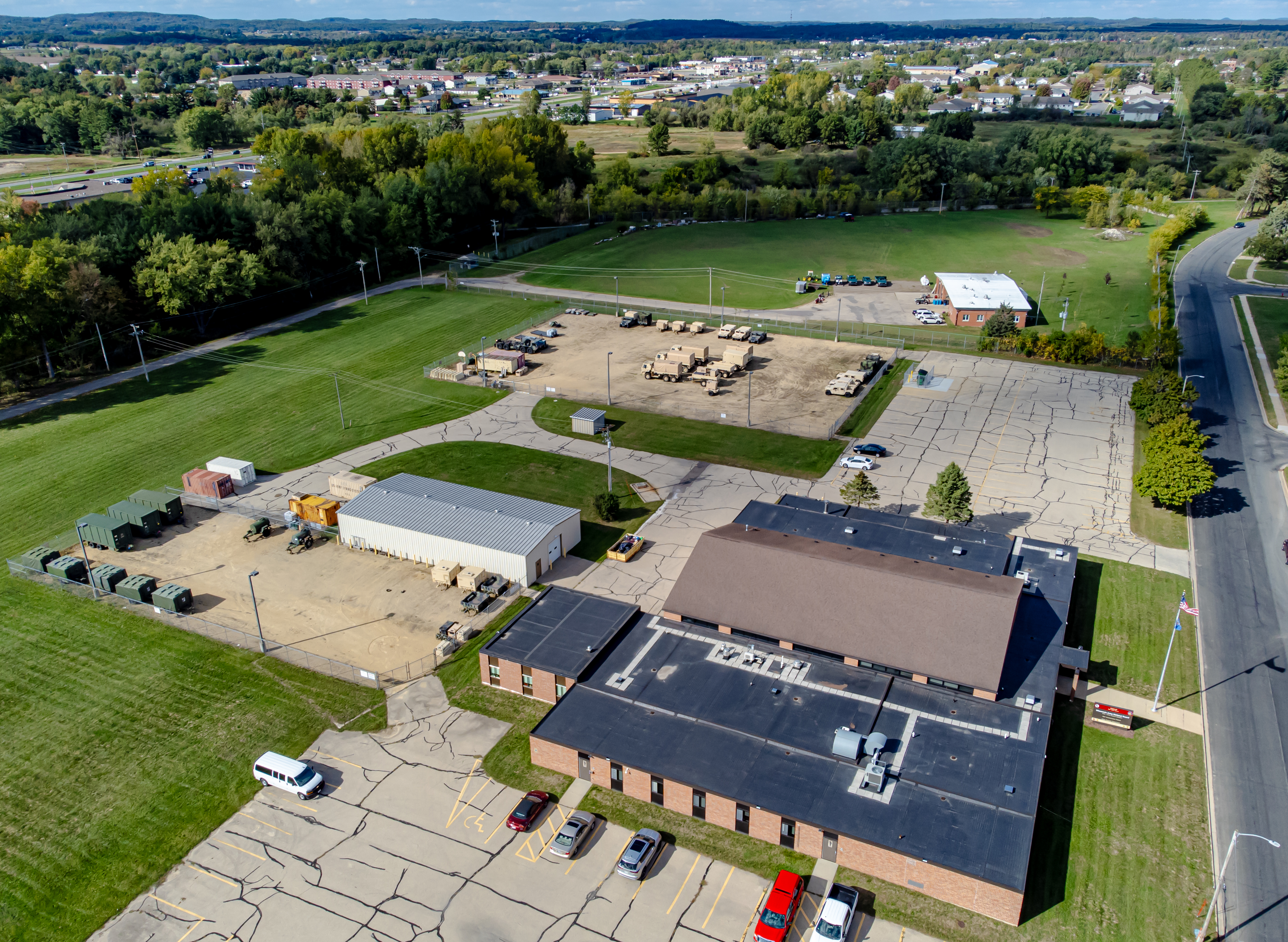
National Guard in Tomah

== See also ==
- Wisconsin State Defense Force
- Wisconsin Naval Militia
