= Wisconsin Air National Guard =

- Wisconsin Air National Guard emblem
- Active: November 12, 1940 – present
- Country: United States
- Allegiance: Wisconsin
- Branch: Air National Guard
- Type: State militia, military reserve force
- Role: "To meet state and federal mission responsibilities."
- Part of: Wisconsin Department of Military Affairs; United States National Guard Bureau
- Garrison/HQ: Wisconsin Air National Guard, 2400 Wright St., Madison, Wisconsin, 53708

Commanders
- Civilian leadership: President Donald Trump (Commander-in-Chief); Troy Meink (Secretary of the Air Force); Governor Tony Evers (Governor of the State of Wisconsin)
- State military leadership: Brigadier General Matthew J. Strub (Adjutant General); Brigadier General Erik A. Peterson (Interim Deputy Adjutant General-Air)

Insignia
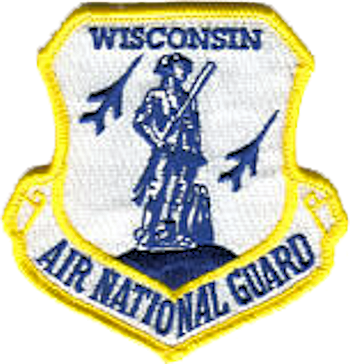
- Alternate Wisconsin Air Guard patch

Aircraft flown
- Fighter: F-35 Lightning II
- Tanker: KC-135R Stratotanker

The Wisconsin Air National Guard (WI ANG) is the aerial militia of the State of Wisconsin, United States of America. It is a reserve of the United States Air Force and along with the Wisconsin Army National Guard, an element of the Wisconsin National Guard, National Guard and United States National Guard Bureau.

As state militia units, the units in the Wisconsin Air National Guard are not in the normal United States Air Force chain of command. They are under the jurisdiction of the governor of Wisconsin through the office of the Wisconsin Adjutant General unless they are federalized by order of the president of the United States. The Wisconsin Air National Guard is headquartered in Madison.

== Overview ==
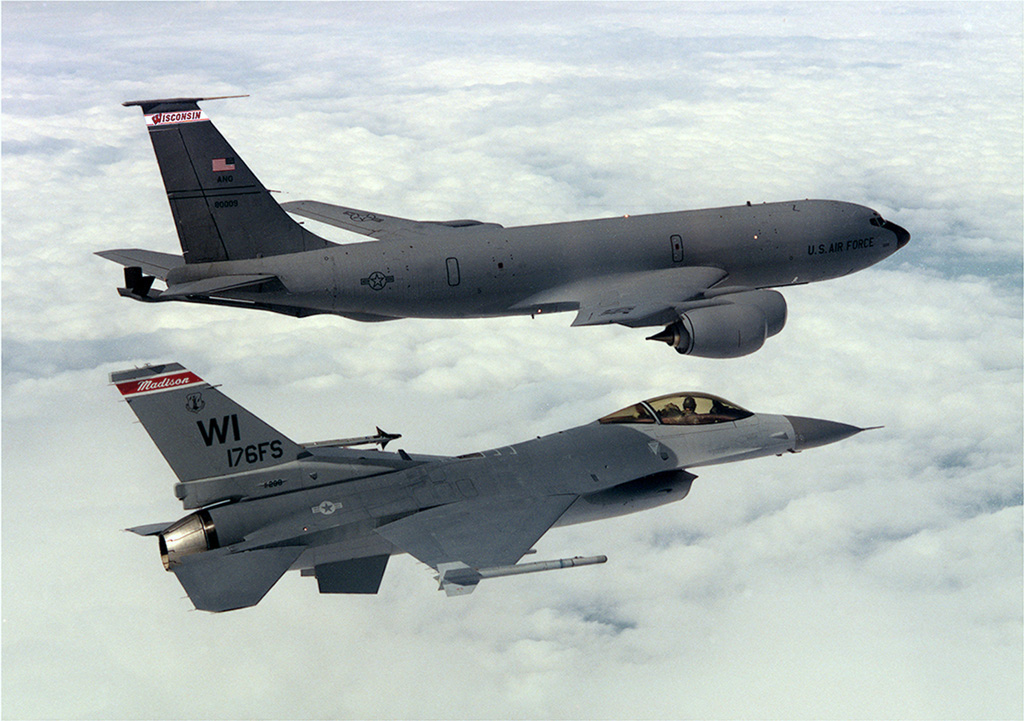
KC-135R Stratotanker from the 128th Air Refueling Squadron, General Mitchell AGB, and an F-16C from the 176th Fighter Squadron, Truax Field AGB

Under the "Total Force" concept, Wisconsin Air National Guard units are considered to be Air Reserve Components (ARC) of the United States Air Force (USAF). Wisconsin ANG units are trained and equipped by the Air Force and are operationally gained by a major command of the USAF if federalized. In addition, the Wisconsin Air National Guard forces are assigned to Air Expeditionary Forces and are subject to deployment tasking orders along with their active duty and Air Force Reserve counterparts in their assigned cycle deployment window.

Along with their federal reserve obligations, as state militia units the elements of the Wisconsin ANG are subject to being activated by order of the governor to provide protection of life and property, and preserve peace, order and public safety. State missions include disaster relief in times of earthquakes, hurricanes, floods and forest fires, search and rescue, protection of vital public services, and support to civil defense.

== Components ==
The Wisconsin Air National Guard consists of the following major units:

- 115th Fighter Wing

Established 6 October 1948 (as: 176th Fighter Squadron); operates: Lockheed Martin F-35 Lightning II
Stationed at: Truax Field Air National Guard Base, Madison
Gained by: Air Combat Command
The 115th Fighter Wing provides multi-role fighter support including air-to-air, close air support and precision guided bombing. The wing currently operates the latest generation of munitions such as the JDAM series bombs and the AIM-9X air-to-air missile.

- 128th Air Refueling Wing

Established 30 July 1940 (as: 126th Observation Squadron); operates: KC-135R Stratotanker
Stationed at: General Mitchell Air National Guard Base, Milwaukee
Gained by: Air Mobility Command
The 128th Air Refueling Wing principal mission is air refueling. The wing enhances the Air Force's capability to accomplish its primary missions of Global Reach and Global Power.

Support Unit Functions and Capabilities:

- 128th Air Control Squadron

Maintains and operates a transportable extension of the Theater Air Control System. In this role the unit provides: (1) An air picture via data links from multiple sensors to the theater commander, (2) Radar control for offensive and defensive air operations, (3) Early warning, detection and tracking of surveillance data, (4) Personnel training and equipment maintenance to sustain a state of readiness for worldwide deployment.

- Volk Field Combat Readiness Training Center

Provides a year-round integrated training environment (airspace, facilities, equipment) for units to enhance their combat capabilities and readiness.

== History ==
The Militia Act of 1903 established the present National Guard system, units raised by the states but paid for by the Federal Government, liable for immediate state service. If federalized by presidential order, they fall under the regular military chain of command. On 1 June 1920, the Militia Bureau issued Circular No.1 on organization of National Guard air units.

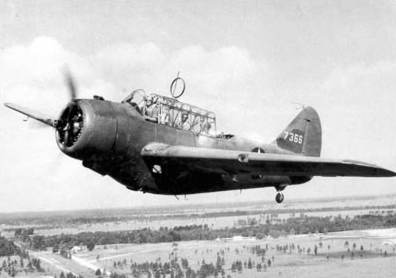
A U.S. Army Air Forces North American O-47A from the 126th Observation Squadron, Wisconsin National Guard. Unlike prewar observation squadrons, the 126th was not assigned to a National Guard division, rather it was assigned directly in support of the II Army Corps and performed various duties, including photographing portions of the Carolina Maneuvers in the autumn of 1941.

The Wisconsin Air National Guard origins date to 30 July 1940 with the establishment of the 126th Observation Squadron and is the oldest unit of the Wisconsin Air National Guard. It is one of the 29 original National Guard Observation Squadrons of the United States Army National Guard formed before World War II. The 126th Observation Squadron was ordered into active service on 2 June 1941 as part of the buildup of the Army Air Corps prior to the United States entry into World War II.

On 24 May 1946, the United States Army Air Forces, in response to dramatic postwar military budget cuts imposed by President Harry S. Truman, allocated inactive unit designations to the National Guard Bureau for the formation of an Air Force National Guard. These unit designations were allotted and transferred to various State National Guard bureaus to provide them unit designations to re-establish them as Air National Guard units.

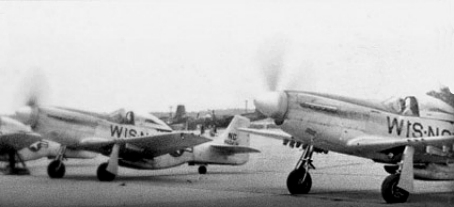
F-51 Mustangs of the Wisconsin Air National Guard, circa 1950

The modern Wisconsin ANG received federal recognition on 25 June 1947 as the 126th Fighter Squadron at General Mitchell Field, Milwaukee. It was equipped with F-51D Mustangs and its mission was the air defense of the state. On 6 October 1948 the 176th Fighter Squadron was formed at Truax Field, Madison, also equipped with F-51D Mustangs with an air defense mission. 18 September 1947, however, is considered the Wisconsin Air National Guard's official birth concurrent with the establishment of the United States Air Force as a separate branch of the United States military under the National Security Act.

On 23 June 1948, the 126th Fighter Squadron was authorized to expand to a group level and the 128th Fighter Group was federally recognized at Milwaukee. The 115th Fighter-Interceptor Group was federally recognized at Madison on 15 April 1956 when the 176th Fighter Squadron was expanded to a Group.

Today, the 128th Air Refueling Wing (128th ARW) provides aerial refueling support to Air Force, Navy and Marine Corps and allied nation aircraft. The 115th Fighter Wing (115 FW) flies the F-35A Lightning II fighter and is part of the USAF Air Combat Command attack forces performing air-interdiction and close air support (CAS).

After the September 11th, 2001 terrorist attacks on the United States, elements of every Air National Guard unit in Wisconsin have been activated in support of the global war on terrorism. Flight crews, aircraft maintenance personnel, communications technicians, air controllers and air security personnel were engaged in Operation Noble Eagle air defense overflights of major United States cities. Wisconsin Air National Guard units have also been deployed overseas as part of Operation Enduring Freedom in Afghanistan and Operation Iraqi Freedom in Iraq, as well as other locations.

== See also ==
- Wisconsin State Defense Force
- Wisconsin Wing Civil Air Patrol
