= 1925 Wisconsin elections =

- April 7, 1925

The 1925 Wisconsin elections were held April 7, 1925. Statewide contests on the ballot included a seat on the Wisconsin Supreme Court and an election for superintendent of public instruction. The election also featured Wisconsin circuit courts and local elections. In addition to the state and local elections held in April, a special election for U.S. Senate was held in Wisconsin on September 29.

== Federal offices ==
=== U.S. Senate ===
A special United States Senate election was held for Wisconsin's Class 1 United States Senate seat on September 29, 1925, to fill the vacancy caused by the death of Republican senator Robert M. La Follette. Robert M. La Follette Jr. was elected to a full six-year term. La Follette defeated Independent (and fellow Republican) former lieutenant governor of Wisconsin Edward Dithmar. Three other candidates also appeared on the general election ballot: John M. Work (Social-Democratic), William G. Bruce (Independent/Democratic), and George Bauman (Socialist Labor).

There were three other candidates in the Republican primary, former state senator from Eau Claire Roy P. Wilcox, Daniel C. Woodward, and former Governor of Wisconsin Francis E. McGovern.

1925 U.S. Senate election in Wisconsin
Party	Candidate	Votes	%	±%
Republican	Robert La Follette Jr.	237,719	67.51%	▼13.16
Independent Republican	Edward F. Dithmar	91,318	25.93%	N/A
Social-Democratic	John M. Work	11,130	3.16%	N/A
Independent Democratic	William G. Bruce	10,743	3.05%	▼0.18
Socialist Labor	George Bauman	795	0.23%	▼0.12
Write-in		430	0.12%	
Total votes		352,135	100.00%	
Republican hold				

== State offices ==
=== Executive ===
==== Superintendent of public instruction ====
1921 Wisconsin Superintendent of Public Instruction election
- April 7, 1925
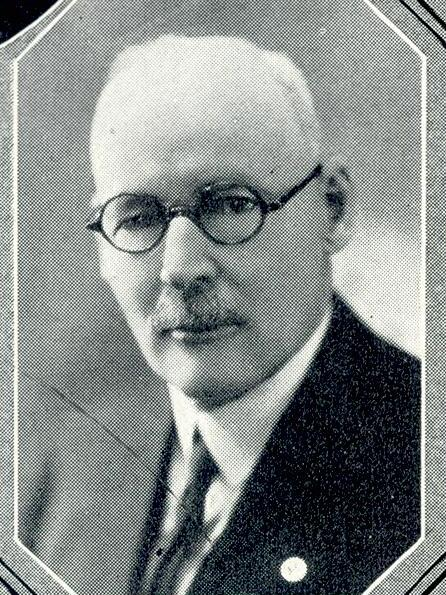
Candidate	John Callahan
Popular vote	342,691
Percentage	99.88%
Justice before election
John Callahan
Elected Justice
John Callahan

A regularly scheduled election for Superintendent of Public Instruction of Wisconsin was held on April 7, 1925. The incumbent superintendent John Callahan, first elected in 1921, was re-elected without opposition.

1925 Wisconsin Superintendent of Public Instruction election
Party	Candidate	Votes	%
General election, April 7, 1925
Nonpartisan	John Callahan (incumbent)	342,691	99.88
	Scattering	403	0.12
Plurality		342,691	99.88
Total votes		343,094	100

=== Judicial ===
==== State Supreme Court ====
1925 Wisconsin Supreme Court election
- April 7, 1925
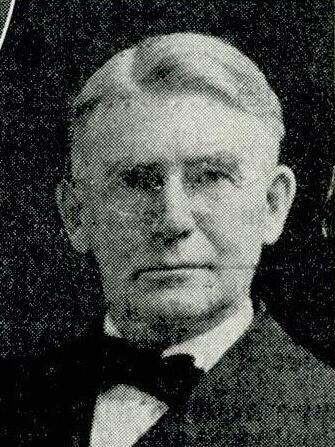

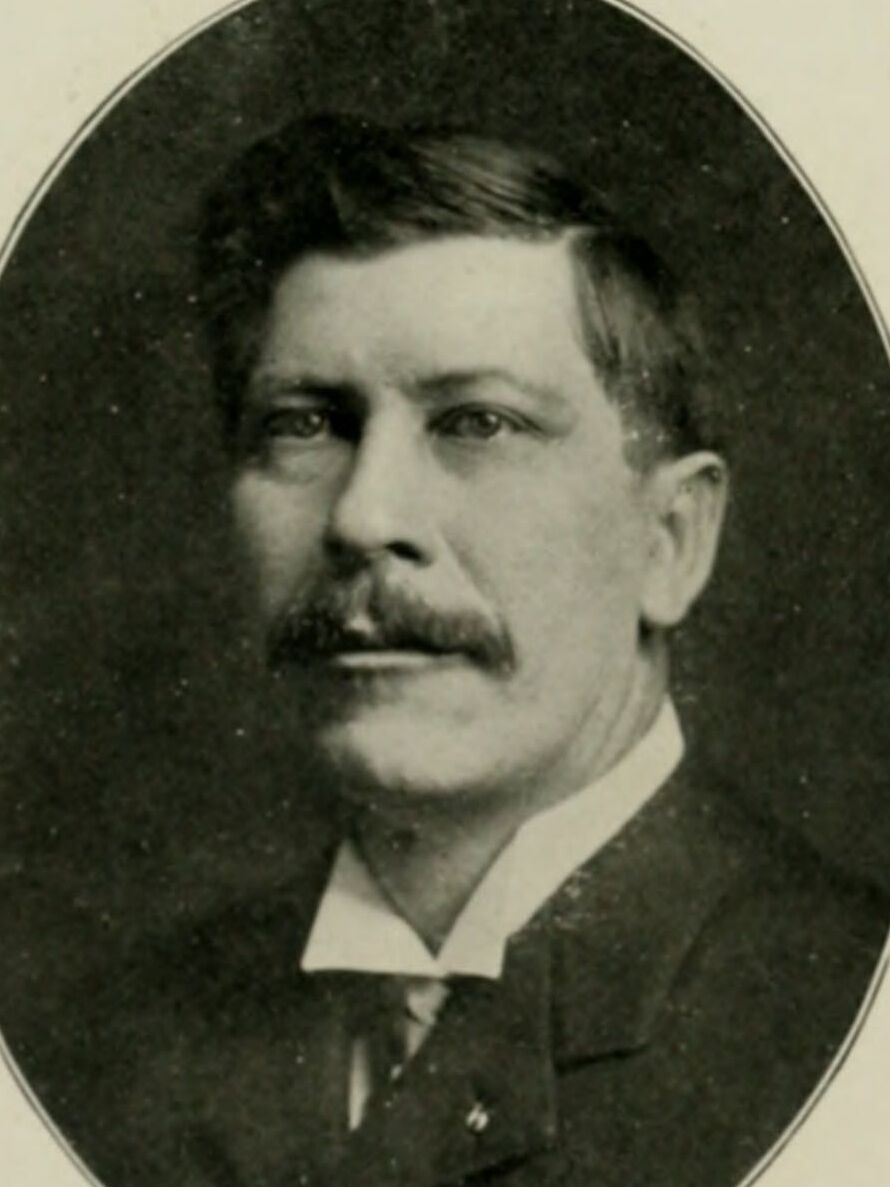
Candidate	E. Ray Stevens	John C. Kleist
Popular vote	256,431	133,164
Percentage	65.81%	34.17%
Justice before election
Burr W. Jones
Elected Justice
E. Ray Stevens

The 1925 Wisconsin Supreme Court election was held on Tuesday, April 7, 1925, to elect a justice to the Wisconsin Supreme Court for a ten-year term. The incumbent justice, Burr W. Jones, declined to seek re-election.

A regularly scheduled Wisconsin Supreme Court election was on the ballot for the general election on April 7, 1925, for a ten-year term on the court. The incumbent judge, Burr W. Jones, first appointed in 1920, declined to seek re-election. E. Ray Stevens (judge of the Wisconsin circuit court for the 9th circuit) defeated John C. Kleist (former district attorney of Calumet County).

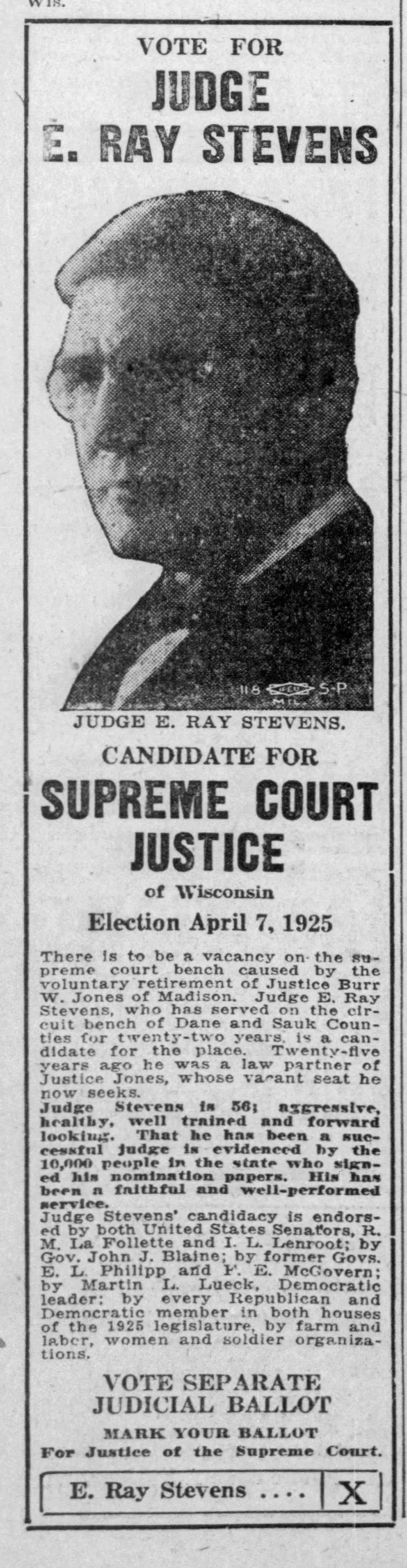
Newspaper advertisement for Stevens' candidacy

Prior to both of their judicial careers, from 1896 to 1903, Jones and Stevens had been law partners in Madison, running the law firm Jones & Stevens. Stevens' campaign advertised endorsements from both of the state's incumbent U.S. senators (Robert M. La Follette Sr. and Irvine Lenroot); incumbent governor John J. Blaine and former governors Emanuel L. Philipp and Francis E. McGovern. In addition to these Republican state leaders, the endorsement of Martin L. Lueck's (a prominent Democratic politician in the state) was also touted. The campaign's advertisements also claimed that each Republican and Democrat in the 57th Wisconsin Legislature had endorsed his candidacy, and also touted supported from "farm and labor, women and soldier organizations."

Kleist, then a lawyer who resided in Milwaukee, had previously served for two-terms as the elected district attorney of Calumet County in the 1880s. He had since his tenure as district attorney run for various judicial and political offices, losing each campaign. He ran several times for seats on the Wisconsin circuit courts in Milwaukee County, but lost all of them. He first ran in 1910 for a seat on the Wisconsin Circuit Courts but lost to Franz C. Eschweiler. He later was the nominee of the Social-Democratic Party of Wisconsin in the 1911 United States Senate election in Wisconsin. Prior to his 1925 campaign, he had run for the same seat on Wisconsin Supreme Court in 1922, losing to Jones.

During the campaign, The Capital Times described Kleist as being the "candidate of the Ku Klux Klan". In 1924, he had been expelled from the Social–Democratic Party over his alleged ties to the Klan. During his campaign, he was supported by the Anti-Saloon League, which promoted his candidacy in the Wisconsin edition of The American Issue.

1925 Wisconsin Supreme Court election
Party	Candidate	Votes	%
General election, April 7, 1925
Nonpartisan	E. Ray Stevens	256,431	65.81
Nonpartisan	John C. Kleist	133,164	34.17
	Scattering	73	0.02
Plurality		123,267	31.63
Total votes		389,668	100

==== Circuit courts ====
Several elections to the Wisconsin circuit courts were contested in 1925, including elections for judgeships on newly created branches of the court in Milwaukee County, Dane County, and Sauk County

Among the notable results in circuit court races was the election of Charles L. Aarons over Henry Cummings for branch number 8 in Milwaukee County.

== Local offices ==
Many local elections were also held coinciding with state elections.

=== Milwaukee County ===
==== Milwaukee ballot propositions ====
Milwaukee voted on local propositions (defeating a proposal for a civic center; defeating a proposal to fund the streetcar services of The Milwaukee Electric Railway and Light Company at-cost, approving a $1 million bond issue for improvements to public schools, and approving a $500,000 bond issue to construct a garbage disposal plant).

==== Milwaukee municipal court ====
The city also elected three judges to its municipal court.

=== Manitowoc County ===
==== Manitowoc mayor ====
Manitowoc re-elected incumbent mayor Martin Georgenson (Socialist Labor Party) over challenger Frank E. Diebert.

==== Manitowoc city council ====
Social-Democrats also increased their representation on its city council by two seats.
