= Carl Habich =

19th century American politician

Member of the Wisconsin Senate from the 26th district
- In office January 6, 1868 – January 3, 1870
- Preceded by: James Kerr Proudfit
- Succeeded by: Romanzo E. Davis

Wisconsin Circuit Court Clerk for Dane County, Wisconsin
- In office January 1, 1863 – January 1, 1865
- Preceded by: J. J. Starks
- Succeeded by: H. A. Lewis

Personal details
- Born: November 13, 1824 Darmstadt, Grand Duchy of Hesse
- Died: May 29, 1901 (aged 76) Indianapolis, Indiana, U.S.
- Resting place: Crown Hill Cemetery, Indianapolis
- Party: Democratic
- Children: 8
- Occupation: Merchant, lawyer

Charles "Carl" Habich Sr. (November 13, 1824 – May 29, 1901) was a German American immigrant, merchant, lawyer, and Democratic politician. He was a member of the Wisconsin Senate, representing western Dane County during the 1868 and 1869 sessions, and was the Democratic nominee for State Treasurer of Wisconsin in the 1857 election.

== Biography ==
Carl Habich was born in November 1824 in Darmstadt, in what is now western Germany. At the time of his birth, this was part of the Grand Duchy of Hesse. He was raised and educated in Germany and emigrated to the United States in 1847. He found work in Wisconsin as a surveyor and worked on surveys in several different areas of the state. He eventually settled in the town of Madison, Wisconsin, where he operated a daguerreotype studio for a number of years. While living there, he became involved in politics with the Democratic Party. He was first elected treasurer of the town of Madison, and was soon after hired as a clerk in the office of the state treasurer under state treasurer Edward H. Janssen. He rose within the treasurer's office, and was deputy treasurer under Janssen's successor, Charles Kuehn.

In 1857, he was nominated by the Democratic Party as their candidate for State Treasurer of Wisconsin. The 1857 election was close in all the statewide offices. Habich fell 400 votes short of Samuel D. Hastings, about the same margin by which Democratic gubernatorial candidate James B. Cross lost to Republican Alexander Randall. During the campaign and for a few years after, Habich was involved in several investigations of the treasurer's office over poor book-keeping practices and potential embezzlement. Testimony implied several state officers—including governors—over several administrations had potentially been appropriating money from the treasury without authorization, but no charges were ever brought against Habich or anyone else.

Though he lost his job with the office of the treasurer, Habich remained involved in public affairs. He was a census taker in Madison during the 1860 United States census, and in 1862, he was elected circuit court clerk for Dane County. During this time, he also became active as a grocer in Madison.

In 1867, he was the Democratic nominee for Wisconsin Senate in the 26th Senate district, which then comprised Madison and the western half of Dane County. He defeated Republican nominee Samuel Klauber, and went on to serve in the 1868 and 1869 legislative sessions. He did not run for re-election in 1869.

He was nominated again for circuit court clerk in 1870, but was defeated by L. D. Frost. Shortly after the election, he moved to Cincinnati, Ohio, and a year later settled in Indianapolis, Indiana. In Indiana, Habich was again active with the state Democratic Party, and was appointed a deputy in the office of the county clerk in Marion County. Although late in life, he decided to study to become a lawyer, was admitted to the practice, and worked for several years as a junior partner to Henry W. Harrington, as well as serving eight years as a justice of the peace.

Habich died at his home in Indianapolis on May 29, 1901, about a week after suffering a stroke. He was survived by his wife and eight children. In addition to his political work, Habich was active with the German Pioneers' Association.

== Electoral history ==
=== Wisconsin State Treasurer (1857) ===
Wisconsin State Treasurer Election, 1857
Party	Candidate	Votes	%	±%
General Election, November 3, 1857
Republican	Samuel D. Hastings	44,699	50.23%	
Democratic	Carl Habich	44,298	49.77%	−3.88%
Plurality		401	0.45%	-6.86%
Total votes		88,997	100.0%	+25.47%

Party political offices
Preceded by Charles Kuehn	Democratic nominee for State Treasurer of Wisconsin; 1857	Succeeded by Lion Silverman
Wisconsin Senate
Preceded by James Kerr Proudfit	Member of the Wisconsin Senate from the 26th district January 6, 1868 – January 3, 1870	Succeeded by Romanzo E. Davis
Legal offices
Preceded by J. J. Starks	Wisconsin Circuit Court Clerk for Dane County, Wisconsin; January 1, 1863 – January 1, 1865	Succeeded by H. A. Lewis
