= 1925 Wisconsin Supreme Court election =

- April 7, 1925

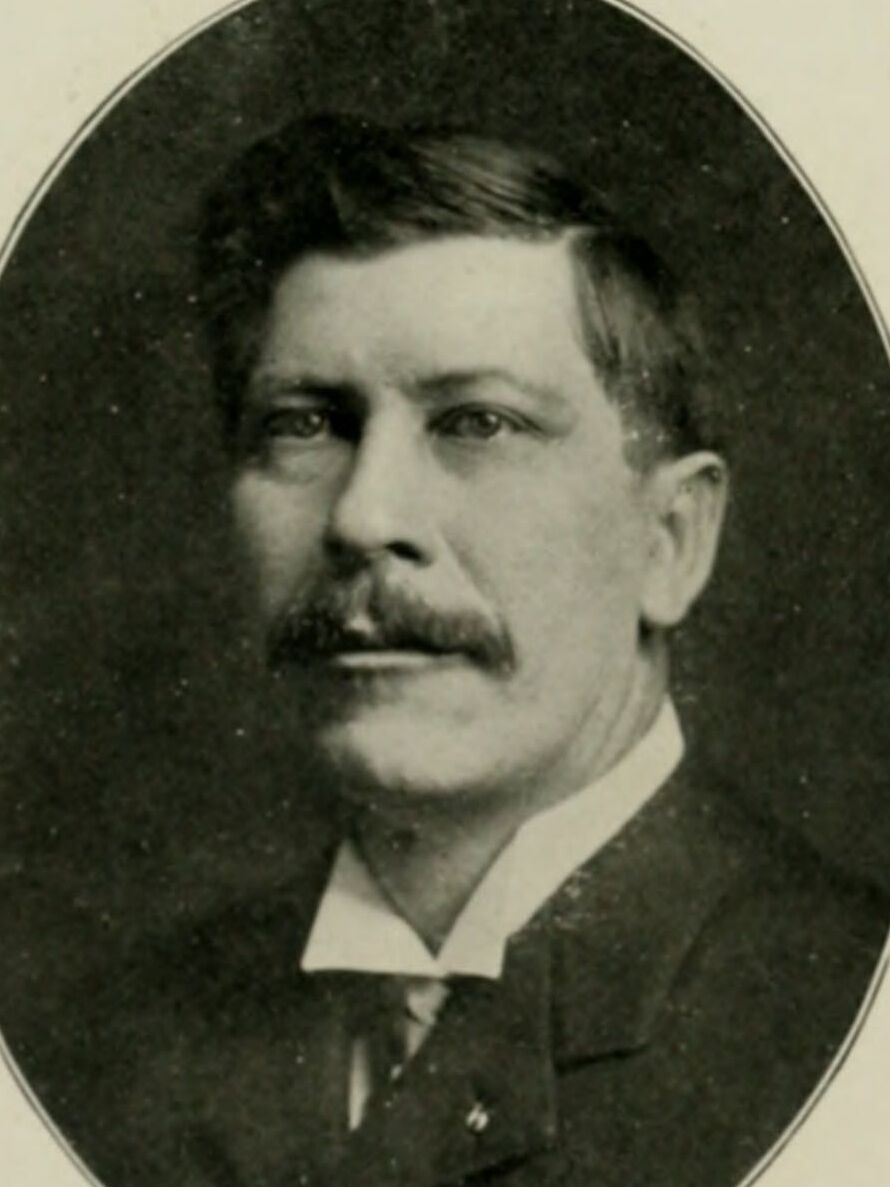
| Candidate | E. Ray Stevens | John C. Kleist |
| Popular vote | 256,431 | 133,164 |
| Percentage | 65.81% | 34.17% |
Justice before election
Burr W. Jones
Elected Justice
E. Ray Stevens

The 1925 Wisconsin Supreme Court election was held on Tuesday, April 7, 1925, to elect a justice to the Wisconsin Supreme Court for a ten-year term. The incumbent justice, Burr W. Jones, declined to seek re-election.

== Background ==
A regularly-scheduled election for a full term, the election was part of the spring general election held on April 7, 1925, for a ten-year term on the court. The incumbent judge, Burr W. Jones, first appointed in 1920, declined to seek re-election. E. Ray Stevens (judge of the Wisconsin circuit court for the 9th circuit) defeated John C. Kleist (former district attorney of Calumet County).

== Candidates ==
- John C. Kleist, Milwaukee attorney and former district attorney of Calumet County (1885–1889)
- E. Ray Stevens, Wisconsin circuit court judge

== Campaign ==
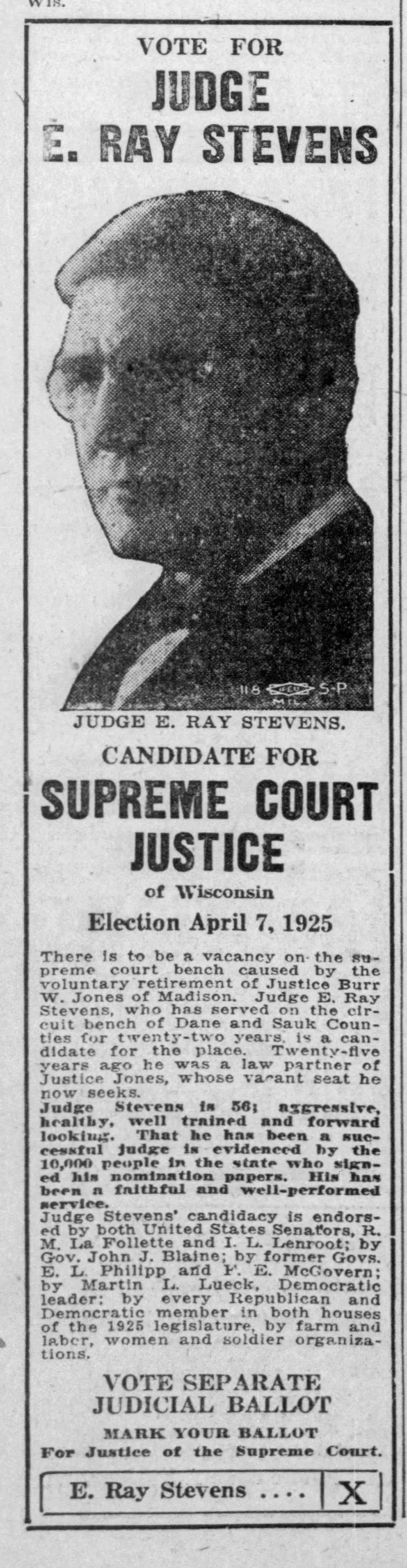
Newspaper advertisement for Stevens' candidacy

Prior to both of their judicial careers, from 1896 to 1903, the retiring incumbent, Burr Jones, and candidate, E. Ray Stevens, had been law partners in Madison, running the law firm Jones & Stevens. Stevens' campaign advertised endorsements from both of the state's incumbent U.S. senators (Robert M. La Follette Sr. and Irvine Lenroot); incumbent governor John J. Blaine and former governors Emanuel L. Philipp and Francis E. McGovern. In addition to these Republican state leaders, an endorsement was also touted from Martin L. Lueck (a prominent Democratic politician in the state). The campaign's advertisements also claimed that each Republican and Democrat in the 57th Wisconsin Legislature had endorsed his candidacy, and also touted supported from "farm and labor, women and soldier organizations."

Kleist, then a lawyer who resided in Milwaukee, had previously served for two-terms as the elected district attorney of Calumet County in the 1880s. He had since his tenure as district attorney run for various judicial and political offices, losing each campaign. He ran several times for seats on the Wisconsin circuit courts in Milwaukee County, but lost all of them. He first ran in 1910 for a Wisconsin circuit court seat but lost to Franz C. Eschweiler. He later was the nominee of the Social-Democratic Party of Wisconsin in the 1911 United States Senate election in Wisconsin. Prior to his 1925 campaign, he had run for the same seat on the Wisconsin Supreme Court in 1922, losing to Jones.

During the campaign, The Capital Times described Kleist as being the "candidate of the Ku Klux Klan". In 1924, he had been expelled from the Social–Democratic Party over his alleged ties to the Klan. During his campaign, he was supported by the Anti-Saloon League, which promoted his candidacy in the Wisconsin edition of The American Issue.

== Results ==
1925 Wisconsin Supreme Court election
| Party | Candidate | Votes | % |
|---|---|---|---|
General election, April 7, 1925
| Nonpartisan | E. Ray Stevens | 256,431 | 65.81 |
| Nonpartisan | John C. Kleist | 133,164 | 34.17 |
| | Scattering | 73 | 0.02 |
| Plurality | | 123,267 | 31.63 |
| Total votes | | 389,668 | 100 |
