= Senator Proudfit =

Senator Proudfit may refer to:

- Andrew Proudfit (1820–1883), Wisconsin State Senate
- James Kerr Proudfit (1831–1917), Wisconsin State Senate
