= Edwin E. Bryant =

American lawyer (1835–1903)

E. E. Bryant
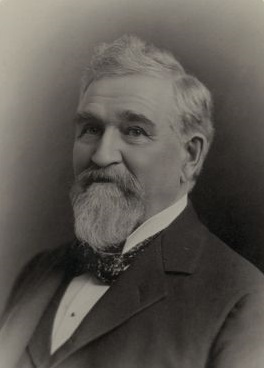

10th & 14th Adjutant General of Wisconsin
- In office May 9, 1876 – January 2, 1882
- Governor: Harrison Ludington; William E. Smith
- Preceded by: George A. Hannaford
- Succeeded by: Chandler P. Chapman
- In office March 28, 1868 – January 2, 1872
- Governor: Lucius Fairchild
- Preceded by: James Kerr Proudfit
- Succeeded by: Robert Monteith

Member of the Wisconsin State Assembly from the Dane 2nd district
- In office January 7, 1878 – January 6, 1879
- Preceded by: Phineas Baldwin
- Succeeded by: Buel Hutchinson

Personal details
- Born: January 10, 1835 Milton, Vermont, U.S.
- Died: August 11, 1903 (aged 68) Ontario, Canada
- Resting place: Forest Hill Cemetery, Madison, Wisconsin
- Party: Republican
- Spouse: Louise Stephens Boynton (died 1905)
- Children: Frances Estell Bryant^{(b. 1860; died 1864)}; Elva (Doolittle)^{(b. 1863; died 1940)}; Clark Chandler Bryant^{(b. 1865; died 1867)}; William Vilas Bryant^{(b. 1876; died 1937)}

Military service
- Allegiance: United States
- Branch/service: United States Army; Union Army; Wisconsin National Guard
- Years of service: 1861–1865 (USV); 1868–1872 (ARNG); 1876–1882 (ARNG)
- Rank: Lt. Colonel, USV; Brig. General, ARNG
- Unit: 3rd Reg. Wis. Vol. Infantry; 50th Reg. Wis. Vol. Infantry
- Battles/wars: American Civil War: Battle of Bolivar Heights; First Battle of Winchester; Northern Virginia Campaign; Battle of Cedar Mountain; Maryland campaign; Battle of Antietam; Chancellorsville campaign; Battle of Chancellorsville; Gettysburg campaign; Battle of Gettysburg; Battle of Williamsport

Edwin Eustace Bryant (January 10, 1835 – August 11, 1903) was an American lawyer, Republican politician, and Union Army officer. He was dean of the University of Wisconsin Law School, served as a private secretary to Wisconsin Governor Lucius Fairchild, and was appointed an assistant attorney general for the United States Postal Service by President Grover Cleveland.

== Early life ==
Edwin Bryant was born in Milton, Vermont, in 1835. He received an academic education and attended the New Hampton Institute for two years. In 1856 he moved to Buffalo, New York, and, the following year, moved to Janesville, Wisconsin, where he was admitted to the State Bar of Wisconsin. Shortly thereafter, he moved to Monroe, Wisconsin, where he practiced law and became part-owner and editor of the Monroe Sentinel.

== Civil War service ==
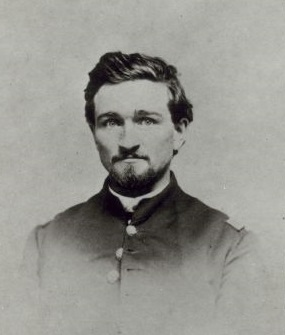
Edwin Bryant photographed during his Civil War service.

At the outbreak of the American Civil War, Bryant volunteered for service with a Wisconsin militia company and was enrolled in the 3rd Wisconsin Infantry Regiment. He declined an officer's commission, but at the organization of the regiment, he was appointed sergeant major. Within a year, he received a commission anyway and was appointed adjutant to the regiment's colonel, Thomas H. Ruger. With the 3rd Wisconsin Infantry, Bryant participated in many of the significant battles of the eastern theater of the war, including Antietam, Chancellorsville, and Gettysburg. In August 1863, he was with the brigade sent to quell the New York City draft riots.

In the fall of 1863, he returned to Wisconsin as commissioner of the draft board and served in that capacity for a year. In the spring of 1865, he was commissioned lieutenant colonel of the 50th Wisconsin Infantry Regiment and returned to federal service. After re-entering federal service, Colonel Bryant was detailed from his regiment to a military commission—he worked as a judge advocate in Missouri for the next year.

== Postbellum career ==
Bryant resigned from military service in 1866 and returned to Monroe, Wisconsin, where he resumed his law practice and became president of the board of directors of Monroe public schools. In 1868, however, he was called to Madison, Wisconsin, to serve as adjutant general of the Wisconsin National Guard and private secretary to Governor Lucius Fairchild. In Madison, Bryant became closely associated with John Coit Spooner and William Freeman Vilas, both of whom later went on to become United States senators. After the end of the Fairchild administration in 1872, Bryant and Vilas were appointed by the Wisconsin Supreme Court to revise and annotate 18 volumes of the Wisconsin reports (Supreme Court decisions). At the same time, Bryant and Vilas entered into a law partnership which would continue for the next decade.

In 1874, Bryant was the Republican nominee for district attorney of Dane County, but was defeated by the Democratic incumbent, Burr W. Jones. In May 1876, Bryant was re-appointed adjutant general of Wisconsin by Governor Harrison Ludington, and was retained in that office by Ludington's successor, William E. Smith. While serving as adjutant general, in 1877, Bryant was elected to one term in the Wisconsin State Assembly from Dane County's 2nd Assembly district (at the time this district comprised the city of Madison and southeast Dane County).

After his term as adjutant general expired in 1882, he was appointed chief clerk of the U.S. House Committee on Public Lands, under the chairmanship of Wisconsin congressman Thaddeus C. Pound, and moved to Washington, D.C. A year later, however, Bryant returned to Madison, purchased a one-third stake in the ownership of the Madison Democrat, and converted his political affiliation to the Democratic Party.

In the 1884 United States presidential election, Bryant campaigned extensively for Grover Cleveland. After his election, Cleveland appointed Bryant assistant attorney general for the United States Postal Service. His longtime friend and colleague, William F. Vilas, was appointed U.S. Postmaster General. He ultimately served in that role for the entire Cleveland administration.

In 1889, Bryant returned to Madison and was appointed dean of the University of Wisconsin Law School, where he served until his death in 1903. Bryant also served as chairman of the Fish Commission of Wisconsin. He also wrote about national law and Wisconsin.

He died on a train near Toronto while traveling to visit his birthplace in Vermont.

== Published works ==
- Bryant, Edwin E. (1891). History of the Third Regiment of Wisconsin Veteran Volunteer Infantry, 1861-1865. Veteran Association of the 3rd Wisconsin Infantry Regiment. OCLC 3525263.
- Bryant, Edwin E. (1899). The Law of Pleading Under the Codes of Civil Procedure. Boston, Little, Brown. OCLC 2045554.
- Bryant, Edwin E. (1901). The Constitution of the United States: with notes of the decisions of the Supreme Court thereon, from the organization of the court till October, 1900. Hein. OCLC 15432735.

== Electoral history ==
=== Dane County District Attorney (1874) ===
Dane County District Attorney Election, 1874
Party	Candidate	Votes	%	±%
General Election, November 3, 1874
Democratic	Burr W. Jones (incumbent)	4,931	53.89%	
Republican	Edwin E. Bryant	4,219	46.11%	
Plurality		712	7.78%	
Total votes		9,150	100.0%	
Democratic hold				

=== Wisconsin Assembly (1877) ===
Wisconsin Assembly, Dane 2nd District Election, 1877
Party	Candidate	Votes	%	±%
General Election, November 6, 1877
Republican	Edwin E. Bryant	1,643	50.06%	
Democratic	John Lamont	1,477	45.00%	
Greenback	H. A. Colburn	162	4.94%	
Plurality		166	5.06%	
Total votes		3,282	100.0%	
Republican hold				

Military offices
Preceded by James Kerr Proudfit	Adjutant General of Wisconsin; March 28, 1868 – January 2, 1872	Succeeded by Robert Monteith
Preceded by George A. Hannaford	Adjutant General of Wisconsin; May 9, 1876 – January 2, 1882	Succeeded by Chandler P. Chapman
Wisconsin State Assembly
Preceded by Phineas Baldwin	Member of the Wisconsin State Assembly from the Dane 2nd district January 7, 1878 – January 6, 1879	Succeeded by Buel Hutchinson
