= 1925 United States Senate special election in Wisconsin =

- September 29, 1925
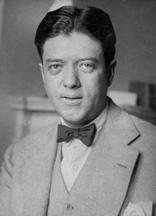

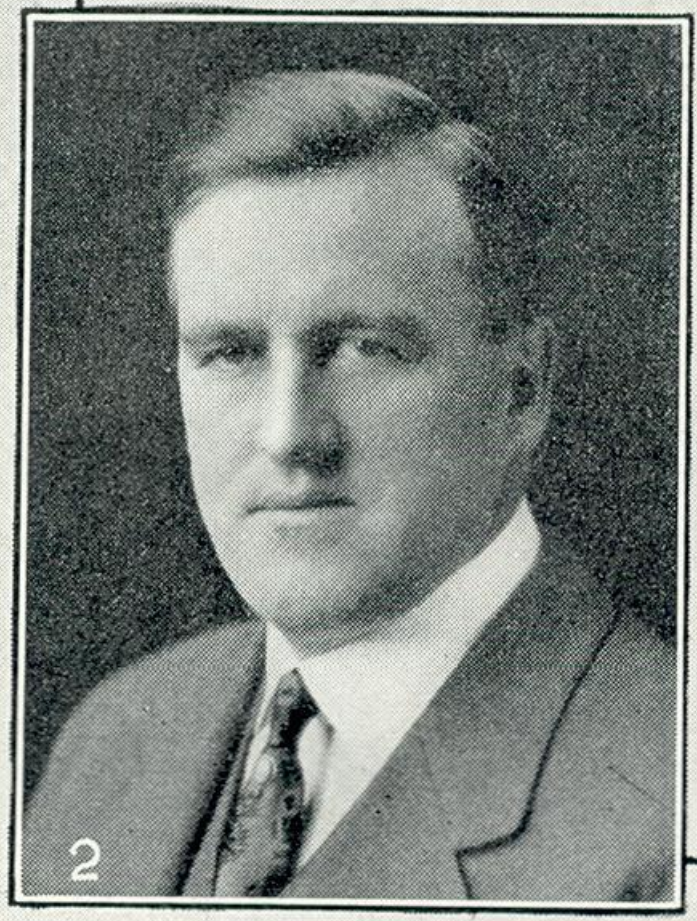
Nominee	Robert La Follette Jr.	Edward F. Dithmar
Party	Republican	Independent Republican
Popular vote	237,719	91,318
Percentage	67.51%	25.93%
- County results La Follette Jr.: 40–50% 50–60% 60–70% 70–80% 80–90% Dithmar: 50–60%
U.S. senator before election
Robert M. La Follette
Republican
Elected U.S. Senator
Robert M. La Follette Jr.
Republican

The 1925 United States Senate election in Wisconsin was held on September 29, 1925, to complete the unexpired term of U.S. Senator Robert La Follette, who died on June 18.

The seat was won by La Follette's son and personal secretary, Robert M. La Follette Jr. over mostly Republican opposition. He defeated three candidates in the Republican primary and overcame a challenge from fellow Republican Edward F. Dithmar, running on a "Coolidge & Dawes Platform" ticket.

== Republican primary ==
=== Candidates ===
- Robert M. La Follette Jr., son and personal secretary of late Senator Robert M. La Follette
- Francis E. McGovern, former governor of Wisconsin (1911–15)
- Roy P. Wilcox, former state senator from Eau Claire and candidate for governor in 1920 and 1924
- Daniel C. Woodward

=== Results ===
1925 Republican U.S. Senate primary
Party	Candidate	Votes	%
Republican	Robert M. La Follette Jr.	178,031	55.86%
Republican	Roy P. Wilcox	81,834	25.68%
Republican	Daniel C. Woodward	40,366	12.67%
Republican	Francis E. McGovern	18,478	5.80%
Total votes		318,709	100.00%

== Democratic primary ==
=== Candidates ===
- Willam G. Bruce, former chair of the Milwaukee Democratic Party
- Rogers

=== Results ===
1925 Democratic U.S. Senate primary
Party	Candidate	Votes	%
Democratic	William G. Bruce	7,393	95.07%
Democratic	Rogers	383	4.93%
Total votes		7,776	100.00%

== Social-Democratic primary ==
=== Candidates ===
- John M. Work, candidate for Governor of Iowa in 1903 and 1910

=== Results ===
1925 Social-Democratic U.S. Senate primary
Party	Candidate	Votes	%
Social-Democratic	John M. Work	5,950	100.00%
Total votes		5,950	100.00%

== General election ==
=== Candidates ===
- John M. Work, candidate for Governor of Iowa in 1903 and 1910 (Social-Democratic)
- Robert M. La Follette Jr., son of late senator La Follette (Republican)
- Edward F. Dithmar, former lieutenant governor of Wisconsin (Independent Republican)
- George Bauman (Socialist Labor)
- William G. Bruce, former chair of the Milwaukee Democratic Party (Independent Democratic)

=== Results ===
1925 U.S. Senate election in Wisconsin
Party	Candidate	Votes	%	±%
Republican	Robert La Follette Jr.	237,719	67.51%	▼13.16
Independent Republican	Edward F. Dithmar	91,318	25.93%	N/A
Social-Democratic	John M. Work	11,130	3.16%	N/A
Independent Democratic	William G. Bruce	10,743	3.05%	▼0.18
Socialist Labor	George Bauman	795	0.23%	▼0.12
Write-in		430	0.12%	
Total votes		352,135	100.00%	
Republican hold				

== See also ==
- 1926 United States Senate elections
- 1925 Wisconsin elections
