= 1918 Wisconsin gubernatorial election =

- November 5, 1918
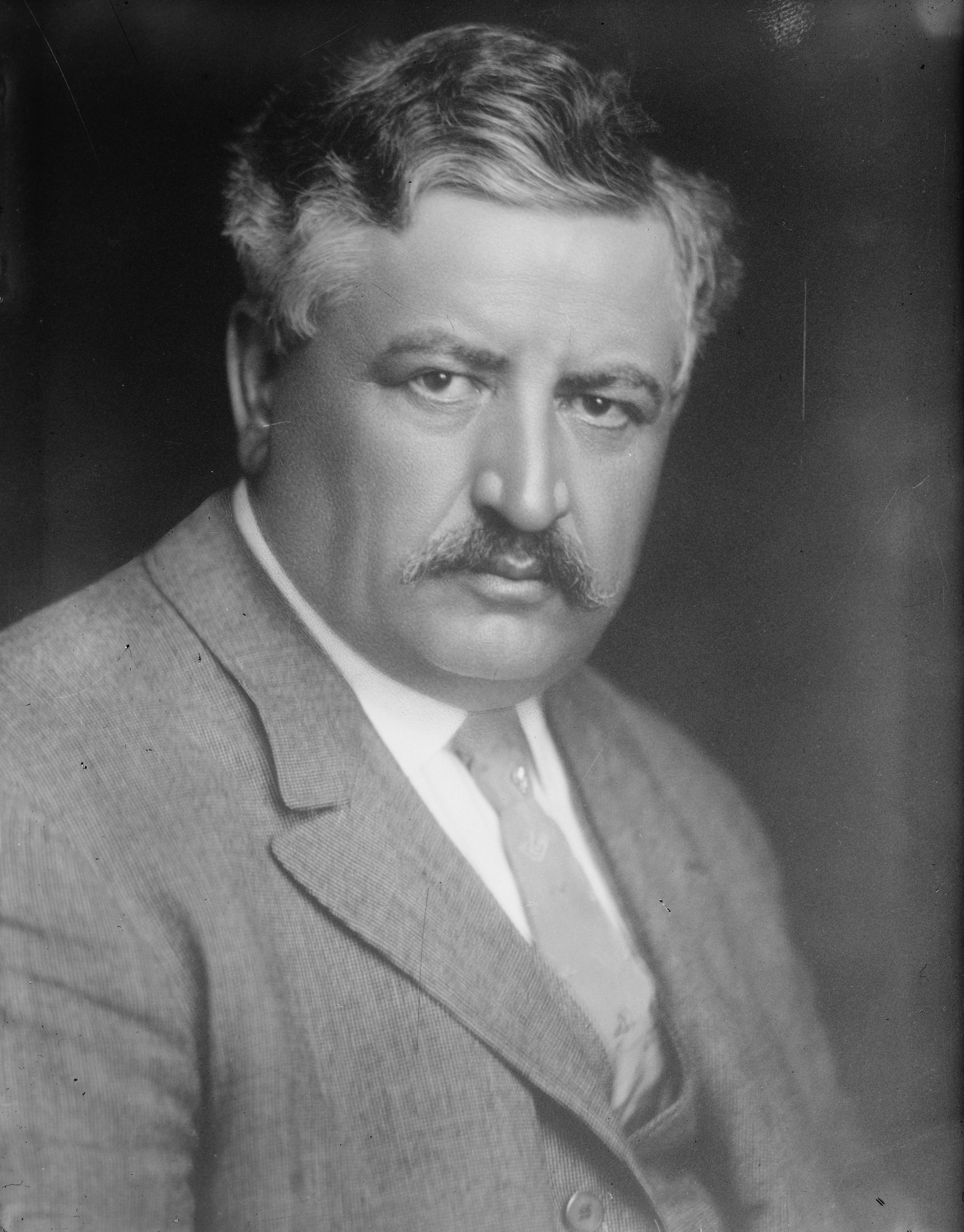

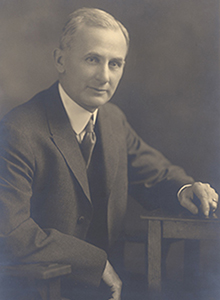

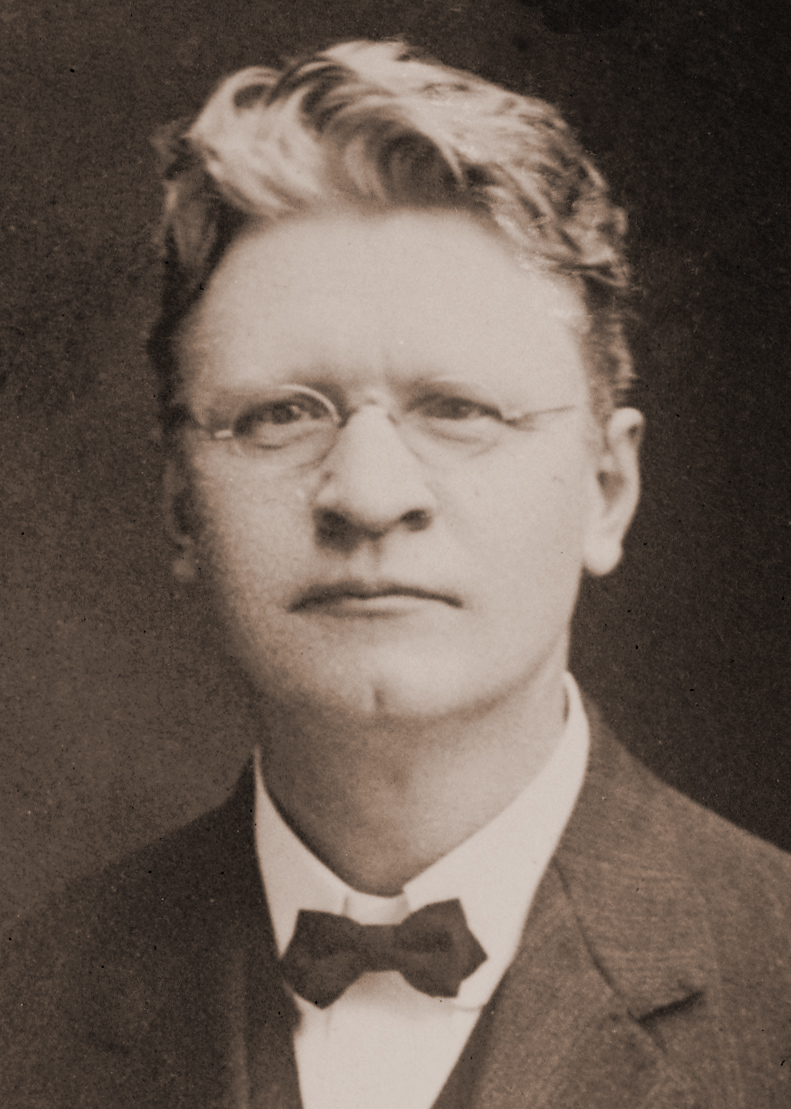
Nominee	Emanuel Lorenz Philipp	Henry A. Moehlenpah	Emil Seidel
Party	Republican	Democratic	Social-Democratic
Popular vote	155,799	112,576	57,523
Percentage	46.99%	33.95%	17.35%
- County results Philipp: 30–40% 40–50% 50–60% 60–70% 70–80% Moehlenpah: 40–50% 50–60% Seidel: 30–40% 40–50%
Governor before election
Emanuel L. Philipp
Republican
Elected Governor
Emanuel L. Philipp
Republican

The 1918 Wisconsin gubernatorial election was held on November 5, 1918. Primary elections were held on September 3, 1918.

Incumbent Republican Governor Emanuel L. Philipp won the election with 46.99% of the vote, winning his third and last term as governor. Philipp defeated Democratic Party candidate Henry A. Moehlenpah and Social-Democratic candidate Emil Seidel.

== Primary election ==
=== Republican party ===
==== Candidates ====
- Emanuel L. Philipp, incumbent Governor
- James N. Tittemore, president of the Wisconsin Society of Equity
- Roy P. Wilcox, incumbent State Senator

==== Results ====
Republican primary results
Party	Candidate	Votes	%
Republican	Emanuel L. Philipp (incumbent)	71,614	38.06%
Republican	Roy P. Wilcox	71,174	37.83%
Republican	James N. Tittemore	45,357	24.11%
Total votes		188,145	100.00%

=== Democratic party ===
==== Candidates ====
- Henry A. Moehlenpah, Democratic nominee for Wisconsin's 1st congressional district in 1908

==== Results ====
Democratic primary results
Party	Candidate	Votes	%
Democratic	Henry A. Moehlenpah	27,469	100.00%
Total votes		27,469	100.00%

=== Social-Democratic party ===
==== Candidates ====
- Emil Seidel, former Mayor of Milwaukee

==== Results ====
Social-Democratic primary results
Party	Candidate	Votes	%
Social-Democratic	Emil Seidel	22,103	100.00%
Total votes		22,103	100.00%

=== Prohibition party ===
==== Candidates ====
- Anthony J. Benjamin, Prohibition nominee for U.S. Senate in 1918 special election
- William C. Dean, Prohibition nominee for Secretary of State of Wisconsin in 1910, Social-Democratic candidate for the Wisconsin State Senate in 1916

==== Results ====
Prohibition primary results
Party	Candidate	Votes	%
Prohibition	William C. Dean	1,017	53.87%
Prohibition	Anthony J. Benjamin	871	46.13%
Total votes		1,888	100.00%

== General election ==
=== Results ===
1918 Wisconsin gubernatorial election (Note: One must exercise caution using the Blue Book as a source for Wisconsin election data for the period of 1890-1920 as it was unreliable during this period. For the 1918 election, the Blue Book has the correct totals although it does contain several mistakes in the county figures. The Blue Book also lists the military vote as a separate total, but those votes were actually tabulated by county.)
Party	Candidate	Votes	%	±%
Republican	Emanuel L. Philipp (incumbent)	155,799	46.99%	−5.94%
Democratic	Henry A. Moehlenpah	112,576	33.95%	−3.94%
Social-Democratic	Emil Seidel	57,523	17.35%	+10.29%
Prohibition	William C. Dean	5,296	1.60%	−0.52%
	Scattering	388	0.12%	
Majority		43,223	13.04%	
Total votes		331,582	100.00%	
Republican hold		Swing	-2.07%	

=== Results by county ===
Philipp was the first Republican to ever win Ozaukee County. Simultaneously, Moehlenpah was the first Democrat since 1857 to win Polk County, the first since 1886 to win Bayfield County, and the first since 1892 to win Ashland County.

County	Emanuel L. Philipp Republican		Henry A. Moehlenpah Democratic		Emil Seidel Social-Democratic		William C. Dean Prohibition		Scattering Write-in		Margin		Total votes cast (Note: These figures include the military vote, which was enumerated separately by county)
County	#	%	#	%	#	%	#	%	#	%	#	%	Total votes cast
Adams	554	53.07%	417	39.94%	43	4.12%	30	2.87%	0	0.00%	137	13.12%	1,044
Ashland	945	38.99%	1,255	51.77%	174	7.18%	46	1.90%	4	0.17%	-310	-12.79%	2,424
Barron	1,672	54.27%	1,143	37.10%	124	4.02%	130	4.22%	12	0.39%	529	17.17%	3,081
Bayfield	601	42.62%	666	47.23%	105	7.45%	38	2.70%	0	0.00%	-65	-4.61%	1,410
Brown	2,750	39.86%	3,791	54.95%	270	3.91%	88	1.28%	0	0.00%	-1,041	-15.09%	6,899
Buffalo	1,044	64.72%	380	23.56%	162	10.04%	23	1.43%	4	0.25%	664	41.17%	1,613
Burnett	671 (Note: The 1919 Blue Book mistakenly gives Philipp 861 in this county; the correct figure is 661 plus 10 military votes.)	57.65%	341	29.30%	119	10.22%	29	2.49%	4	0.34%	330	28.35%	1,164
Calumet	974	35.82%	592	21.77%	1,132	41.63%	17	0.63%	4	0.15%	-158 (Note: Seidel's margin over Philipp)	-5.81%	2,719
Chippewa	2,022	51.13%	1,741	44.02%	100	2.53%	73	1.85%	19	0.48%	281	7.10%	3,955
Clark	1,841	51.68%	1,040	29.20%	593	16.65%	82	2.30%	6	0.17%	801	22.49%	3,562
Columbia	2,319	51.38%	1,858	41.17%	255	5.65%	79	1.75%	2	0.04%	461	10.21%	4,513
Crawford	1,402	54.68%	1,035	40.37%	62	2.42%	63	2.46%	2	0.08%	367	14.31%	2,564
Dane	6,083	53.54%	4,604	40.52%	423	3.72%	230	2.02%	22	0.19%	1,479	13.02%	11,362
Dodge	4,741	53.50%	2,716	30.65%	1,315	14.84%	89	1.00%	0	0.00%	2,025	22.85%	8,861
Door	1,278	66.36%	486	25.23%	116	6.02%	43	2.23%	3	0.16%	792	41.12%	1,926
Douglas	2,233	48.92%	1,460	31.98%	603	13.21%	262	5.74%	7	0.15%	773	16.93%	4,565
Dunn	1,551	67.94%	576	25.23%	83	3.64%	55	2.41%	18	0.79%	975	42.71%	2,283
Eau Claire	2,082	53.28%	1,467	37.54%	246	6.29%	108	2.76%	5	0.13%	615	15.74%	3,908
Florence	319	73.84%	87	20.14%	17	3.94%	9	2.08%	0	0.00%	232	53.70%	432
Fond du Lac	3,940	48.21%	3,362	41.14%	760	9.30%	110	1.35%	0	0.00%	578	7.07%	8,172
Forest	419	54.06%	307	39.61%	30	3.87%	19	2.45%	0	0.00%	112	14.45%	775
Grant	3,115	59.41%	1,917	36.56%	54	1.03%	148	2.82%	9	0.17%	1,198	22.85%	5,243
Green	1,578	55.25%	1,092	38.24%	74	2.59%	110	3.85%	2	0.07%	486	17.02%	2,856
Green Lake	1,365	52.95%	928	36.00%	255	9.89%	30	1.16%	0	0.00%	437	16.95%	2,578
Iowa	1,749	55.88%	1,203	38.43%	32	1.02%	141	4.50%	5	0.16%	546	17.44%	3,130
Iron	706	73.24%	185	19.19%	50	5.19%	23	2.39%	0	0.00%	521	54.05%	964
Jackson	1,204	66.23%	501	27.56%	61	3.36%	48	2.64%	4	0.22%	703	38.67%	1,818
Jefferson	3,152	57.48%	1,840	33.55%	422	7.70%	70	1.28%	0	0.00%	1,312	23.92%	5,484
Juneau	1,539	58.94%	964	36.92%	65	2.49%	42	1.61%	1	0.04%	575	22.02%	2,611
Kenosha	2,919	55.01%	1,839 (Note: The 1919 Blue Book mistakenly gives Moehlenpah 1,896 in this county; the correct figure is 1,806 plus 33 military votes.)	34.66%	490	9.23%	55	1.04%	3	0.06%	1,080	20.35%	5,306
Kewaunee	1,247	50.14%	1,132	45.52%	86	3.46%	17	0.68%	5	0.20%	115	4.62%	2,487
La Crosse	3,214	58.71%	1,909	34.87%	260	4.75%	90	1.64%	1	0.02%	1,305	23.84%	5,474
Lafayette	1,693	49.40%	1,637	47.77%	19	0.55%	76	2.22%	2	0.06%	56	1.63%	3,427
Langlade	1,307	48.86%	1,243	46.47%	86	3.21%	38	1.42%	1	0.04%	64	2.39%	2,675
Lincoln	1,124	45.30%	733	29.54%	587	23.66%	37	1.49%	0	0.00%	391	15.76%	2,481
Manitowoc	2,312	30.79%	2,229	29.68%	2,924	38.94%	40	0.53%	4	0.05%	-612	-8.15%	7,509
Marathon	2,827	33.71%	1,949	23.24%	3,544	42.26%	66	0.79%	0	0.00%	-717	-8.55%	8,386
Marinette	1,796	50.99%	1,354	38.44%	288	8.18%	84	2.39%	0	0.00%	442	12.55%	3,522
Marquette	848	47.99%	692	39.16%	206	11.66%	21	1.19%	0	0.00%	156	8.83%	1,767
Milwaukee	26,182	35.60%	20,107	27.34%	26,943	36.64%	307	0.42%	2	0.00%	-761	-1.03%	73,541
Monroe	1,690	56.90%	1,038	34.95%	171	5.76%	67	2.26%	4	0.13%	652	21.95%	2,970
Oconto	1,665	50.14%	1,339	40.32%	275	8.28%	38	1.14%	4	0.12%	326	9.82%	3,321
Oneida	880	50.06%	723	41.13%	141 (Note: The 1919 Blue Book mistakenly gives Seidel 149 in this county; the correct figure is 140 plus 1 military vote.)	8.02%	13	0.74%	1	0.06%	157	8.93%	1,758
Outagamie	3,674	54.77%	2,250	33.54%	608	9.06%	104	1.55%	72	1.07%	1,424	21.23%	6,708
Ozaukee	1,311	45.94%	775	27.15%	753	26.38%	15	0.53%	0	0.00%	536	18.78%	2,854
Pepin	476	55.54%	338	39.44%	23	2.68%	19	2.22%	1	0.12%	138	16.10%	857
Pierce	1,148	56.03%	745	36.36%	71	3.47%	67	3.27%	18	0.88%	403	19.67%	2,049
Polk	1,145	41.10%	1,447	51.94%	132	4.74%	61	2.19%	1	0.04%	-302	-10.84%	2,786
Portage	1,845	44.16%	2,149	51.44%	116	2.78%	63	1.51%	5	0.12%	-304	-7.28%	4,178
Price	845	49.74%	631	37.14%	175	10.30%	44	2.59%	4	0.24%	214	12.60%	1,699
Racine	4,061	48.83%	3,216	38.67%	816	9.81%	217	2.61%	7	0.08%	845	10.16%	8,317
Richland	1,239	48.70%	1,092	42.92%	41	1.61%	169	6.64%	3	0.12%	147	5.78%	2,544
Rock	3,747	52.73%	3,079	43.33%	125	1.76%	154	2.17%	1	0.01%	668	9.40%	7,106
Rusk	664	57.49%	388	33.59%	71	6.15%	26	2.25%	6	0.52%	276	23.90%	1,155
Sauk	2,685	58.14%	1,556	33.69%	202	4.37%	166	3.59%	9	0.19%	1,129	24.45%	4,618
Sawyer	503	63.83%	222	28.17%	37	4.70%	26	3.30%	0	0.00%	281	35.66%	788
Shawano	1,645	45.57%	705	19.53%	1,187	32.88%	54	1.50%	19	0.53%	458 (Note: Philipp's margin over Seidel)	12.69%	3,610
Sheboygan	2,791	31.36%	2,181	24.50%	3,867	43.44%	53	0.60%	9	0.10%	-1,076	-12.09%	8,901
St. Croix	1,618	49.72%	1,469	45.14%	90	2.77%	70	2.15%	7	0.22%	149	4.58%	3,254
Taylor	772	39.94%	528	27.32%	592	30.63%	36	1.86%	5	0.26%	180	9.31%	1,933
Trempealeau	1,487	63.68%	766	32.81%	36	1.54%	46	1.97%	0	0.00%	721	30.88%	2,335
Vernon	1,478	60.50%	794	32.50%	64	2.62%	98	4.01%	9	0.37%	684	28.00%	2,443
Vilas	343	47.97%	309	43.22%	52	7.27%	11	1.54%	0	0.00%	34	4.76%	715
Walworth	2,526	55.54%	1,829	40.22%	86	1.89%	97	2.13%	10	0.22%	697	15.33%	4,548
Washburn	600	60.85%	318	32.25%	37	3.75%	28	2.84%	3	0.30%	282	28.60%	986
Washington	2,308	48.13%	1,085	22.63%	1,374	28.65%	28	0.58%	0	0.00%	934	19.48%	4,795
Waukesha	3,014	45.66%	2,937	44.49%	556	8.42%	94	1.42%	0	0.00%	77	1.17%	6,601
Waupaca	2,955	59.93%	1,284	26.04%	596	12.09%	88	1.78%	8	0.16%	1,671	33.89%	4,931
Waushara	1,420	62.09%	643	28.12%	155	6.78%	59	2.58%	10	0.44%	777	33.97%	2,287
Winnebago	4,209	50.46%	2,932	35.15%	1,049	12.57%	142	1.70%	10	0.12%	1,277	15.31%	8,342
Wood	1,737	46.92%	1,030	27.82%	847	22.88%	77	2.08%	11	0.30%	707	19.10%	3,702
Total	155,799	46.99%	112,576	33.95%	57,523	17.35%	5,296	1.60%	388	0.12%	43,223	13.04%	331,582

==== Counties that flipped from Democratic to Republican ====
- Dane
- Iowa
- Kewaunee
- La Crosse
- Ozaukee

==== Counties that flipped from Republican to Democratic ====
- Ashland
- Bayfield
- Brown
- Polk

==== Counties that flipped from Republican to Socialist ====
- Calumet
- Manitowoc
- Marathon
- Milwaukee
- Sheboygan

== Bibliography ==
- Gubernatorial Elections, 1787-1997. Washington, D.C.: Congressional Quarterly Inc. 1998. ISBN 1-56802-396-0.
- Glashan, Roy R. (1979). American Governors and Gubernatorial Elections, 1775-1978. Meckler Books. ISBN 0-930466-17-9.
- Hunter, Paul F., ed. (1919). The Wisconsin Blue Book, 1919. Madison, Wisconsin: Democrat Printing Co., State Printer.
