= Erasmus Richardson =

American banker and politician (1810–1892)

Erasmus D. Richardson

Member of the Wisconsin State Assembly from the Walworth 3rd district
- In office June 5, 1848 – January 1, 1849
- Preceded by: Position established
- Succeeded by: Samuel D. Hastings

Chairman of the Board of Supervisors of Walworth County
- In office April 1870 – April 1871
- Preceded by: William D. Chapin
- Succeeded by: Joseph F. Lyon

Village President of Geneva, Wisconsin
- In office April 1877 – April 1878
- Preceded by: B. O. Reynolds
- Succeeded by: G. E. Catlin
- In office April 1870 – April 1872
- Preceded by: T. C. Smith
- Succeeded by: S. H. Stafford
- In office April 1856 – August 1856
- Preceded by: Position established
- Succeeded by: Harrison Rich

Personal details
- Born: November 26, 1810 Burlington, New York
- Died: January 2, 1892 (aged 81) Lake Geneva, Wisconsin
- Resting place: Pioneer Cemetery; Lake Geneva, Wisconsin
- Party: Democratic
- Spouses: Elizabeth W. Spafford; (m. 1834; died 1841); Alma O. Spafford; (m. 1843)
- Children: Elizabeth (Buell)^{(b. 1841; died 1917)}
- Parents: Caleb Richardson (father); Clarissa (Knight) Richardson (mother)

Erasmus Darwin Richardson (November 26, 1810 – January 2, 1892) was an American banker in Geneva, Wisconsin, who served as a member of the 1st Wisconsin Legislature in the Wisconsin State Assembly, as well as holding various local offices.

== Background and personal life ==
Richardson was born February 26, 1810, in Burlington, New York, son of Caleb and Clarissa (Knight) Richardson. He attended the local public primary school, and taught school himself until the age of 21. At that time, he took charge of a small school in Cooperstown, New York, where he was assisted by Elizabeth "Betsy" W. Spafford for three years. Ill health forced him to leave the teaching profession. He married Spafford on October 23, 1834, in Cooperstown; they had one child, Elizabeth. He wandered in the unsettled western territories for a while, recovering his health; then returned to Cooperstown and worked some years as a bookkeeper. On August 30, 1841, Betsy died there.

In 1842, the widowed Richardson came to Walworth County, Wisconsin, settling on farmland in Hudson which was annexed by the village of Geneva in 1844. He soon found work at a store owned by the Spafford (sometimes spelled Spafard) family, and on February 16, 1843, he married Alma O. Spafford, sister of his first wife, Elizabeth, in Geneva. He was an Episcopalian, and in 1850 was one of the officers elected on the organization of an Episcopalian church in Geneva.

== Public office ==
Soon after coming to Walworth County, Richardson was elected a justice of the peace, a position he held for thirteen years. In 1845 and 1846, he was town clerk of Geneva. Richardson was a Democrat, and was elected from the Walworth County Assembly district that included the Towns of Bloomfield, Geneva, and Hudson (now Lyons). He was succeeded in the next session by Samuel D. Hastings, a Freesoiler. He was again elected town clerk in 1850, and became village president of the village of Geneva (now Lake Geneva) in 1856, although he left office early. (He was also for some time colonel of the local militia regiment, a position at that time more honorary than martial.)

In 1869, he was elected clerk of the village. In 1870, he served as chairman of the county board of supervisors. He was village president from 1870–71, and once more in 1877.

== Business activities ==
Richardon began his private Bank of Geneva in 1848, and continued as its sole proprietor until his death. In 1871, he was part of a group who obtained a charter for the State Line and Union Railway Company, which was soon absorbed into the Chicago and North Western system. When he died on January 2, 1892, it was discovered that his bank, which had survived the Panic of 1857, the 1871 loss to burglary of its entire cash holdings, and the Panic of 1873, was "somewhat involved" and partially insolvent. Given his history of safe and sound financial practices, the confusion was laid to the infirmities of old age in his final years.
