= Henry A. Moehlenpah =

American banker and politician (1867–1949)

Henry Moehlenpah
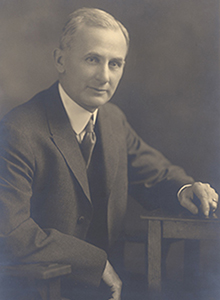

Member of the Federal Reserve Board
- In office November 10, 1919 – August 9, 1920
- Appointed by: Woodrow Wilson
- Preceded by: Frederic Adrian Delano
- Succeeded by: David C. Wills

Personal details
- Born: March 9, 1867 Joliet, Illinois, U.S.
- Died: November 9, 1944 (aged 77) Milwaukee, Wisconsin, U.S.
- Resting place: Clinton Cemetery, Clinton, Rock County, Wisconsin
- Party: Democratic
- Spouse: Alice Louise Hartshorn (m. 1896–1944)
- Education: Northwestern University (BA)
- Occupation: Banker

Henry A. Moehlenpah (March 9, 1867 – November 9, 1944) was an American banker and Democratic politician who served as a member of the Federal Reserve Board from 1919 to 1920. He had previously been an unsuccessful candidate for governor of Wisconsin and U.S. House of Representatives.

== Early life and education ==
Moehlenpah was born in Joliet, Illinois, on March 9, 1867. He graduated from Northwestern University.

== Career ==
He entered upon the career of banking in Joliet, Ill., in 1888, removing to Clinton, Wisconsin, in 1893, where he engaged in the banking business.

Moehlenpah was the Democratic nominee for United States House of Representatives in Wisconsin's 1st congressional district in 1908, but was defeated by the incumbent Henry Allen Cooper. He subsequently sought the Democratic nomination for Lieutenant Governor of Wisconsin in 1912, but lost the primary to Harry W. Bolens, who went on to lose the general election. Six years later, in the 1918 Wisconsin gubernatorial election, Moehlenpah was chosen as the Democratic nominee for Governor. He was defeated in the general election by the incumbent governor, Emanuel L. Philipp.

During these years, he was also prominent in state banking affairs and was president of the state bankers' association in 1913 and 1914. He was then president of the Bankers Joint Stock Land Bank from 1918 until his appointment to the Federal Reserve Board. At the time of his appointment he was also president of the Citizens Bank of Clinton, Wisconsin, president of the Wisconsin Mortgage & Security Co. of Milwaukee, Wisconsin, and director of the Rock County Savings & Mortgage Co.

Moehlenpah was nominated to serve on the Federal Reserve Board by President Woodrow Wilson on September 5, 1919, to fill the unexpired term of Mr. F. A. Delano. On September 23, the nomination was confirmed by the Senate. He ultimately started his term on the Federal Reserve Board on November 10, 1919, and served less than a year—he resigned on August 9, 1920.

After resigning from the Board, Moehlenpah moved to Milwaukee, Wisconsin, and started a new corporation, known as the Wisconsin Finance Corporation, in partnership with several other former state banking association presidents. He resided in Milwaukee for the rest of his life.

== Personal life and family ==
Henry Moehlenpah was a son of Frederick and Elizabeth Moehlenpah. He married Alice Hartshorn in 1896. They had at least one daughter together, and were members of the Methodist church.

Moehlenpah died at a Milwaukee hospital on November 9, 1944. He was buried at Clinton Cemetery, in Clinton, Wisconsin.

== Electoral history ==
=== U.S. House of Representatives (1908) ===
Wisconsin's 1st Congressional District Election, 1908
Party	Candidate	Votes	%	±%
General Election, November 3, 1908
Republican	Henry Allen Cooper (incumbent)	26,728	60.58%	−0.52%
Democratic	Henry A. Moehlenpah	14,018	31.77%	−1.43%
Social Democratic	William A. Jacobs	1,791	4.06%	−1.60%
Prohibition	J. H. Berkey	1,576	3.57%	
N/a	Scattering	4	0.01%	
Plurality		12,710	28.81%	+0.91%
Total votes		44,117	100.0%	+66.15%

=== Lieutenant Governor of Wisconsin (1912) ===
Wisconsin Lieutenant Gubernatorial Election, 1912
Party	Candidate	Votes	%	±%
Democratic Primary, September 3, 1912
Democratic	Harry W. Bolens	49,293	66.21%	
Democratic	Henry A. Moehlenpah	25,159	33.79%	
Plurality		24,134	32.42%	
Total votes		74,452	100.0%	

=== Wisconsin Governor (1918) ===
Wisconsin Gubernatorial Election, 1918
Party	Candidate	Votes	%	±%
General Election, November 5, 1918
Republican	Emanuel L. Philipp (incumbent)	155,799	46.99%	−5.94%
Democratic	Henry A. Moehlenpah	112,576	33.95%	−3.94%
Socialist	Emil Seidel	57,523	17.35%	+10.29%
Prohibition	William C. Dean	5,296	1.60%	−0.52%
N/a	Scattering	388	0.12%	
Plurality		12,710	28.81%	+0.91%
Total votes		44,117	100.0%	+66.15%

Party political offices
Preceded by Burt Williams	Democratic nominee for Governor of Wisconsin; 1918	Succeeded by Robert Bruce McCoy
Government offices
Preceded by Frederic Adrian Delano	Member of the Federal Reserve Board of Governors; 1919–1920	Succeeded by David C. Wills
