= Charles Kuehn =

19th century American politician

3rd Treasurer of Wisconsin
- In office January 7, 1856 – January 4, 1858
- Governor: William A. Barstow; Arthur MacArthur Sr. Coles Bashford
- Preceded by: Edward H. Janssen
- Succeeded by: Samuel D. Hastings

Member of the Wisconsin State Assembly from the Manitowoc County district
- In office January 1, 1849 – January 6, 1851
- Preceded by: Ezra Durgin
- Succeeded by: G. C. Oscar Malmros

Personal details
- Born: c.1818 Kingdom of Saxony
- Died: November 2, 1865 (aged 46–47) Two Rivers, Wisconsin, U.S.
- Cause of death: Stroke
- Party: Democratic
- Spouse: Henrietta K. L. Ebel (m. 1848–1865)
- Occupation: Merchant, banker

Charles Kuehn (c.1818 – November 2, 1865) was a German American immigrant, banker, and Democratic politician. He was the 3rd state treasurer of Wisconsin and served two terms in the Wisconsin State Assembly, representing Manitowoc County during the 1849 and 1850 legislative sessions.

== Biography ==
Charles Kuehn was born about 1818 in the Kingdom of Saxony.

He emigrated to the United States sometime before 1848. He settled in Two Rivers, Wisconsin, in Manitowoc County, where he operated a grocery and dry goods store for several years. He was elected without opposition to the Wisconsin State Assembly in 1848, running on the Democratic Party ticket. His district at the time comprised all of Manitowoc County. He ran for re-election in 1849, and won a second term, defeating Whig candidate James L. Kyle.

In 1854, he was the Democratic nominee for Wisconsin Senate in the 1st State Senate district, but was defeated in the general election by David Taylor of Sheboygan.

The following year, Kuehn received the Democratic nomination for State Treasurer of Wisconsin. He was the only candidate on the statewide Democratic slate that year who was not tainted by the corruption scandals of the Barstow administration, and was narrowly elected over Republican nominee Charles Roeser. He served two years and was not a candidate for re-election in 1857.

Kuehn's term as treasurer was controversial. He started his own bank in Manitowoc during his term as treasurer, and was accused of transferring all the gold currency from the treasury to his own bank, in exchange for his own wildcat currency.

In the pivotal 1860 United States presidential election, Kuehn was one of a small portion of Wisconsin Democrats who supported the Southern Democratic candidate John C. Breckinridge.

Kuehn's banks prospered for a short time, but in the midst of the American Civil War, Kuehn made the fateful decision to invest his own money as well as the banks' in Confederate bonds. The defeat of the Confederacy was a financial disaster for him and his banks, eventually resulting in their failure, able to pay out only 45 cents on the dollar to their depositors. Kuehn died just a few months after the war's end, in November 1865, but before his bank's imminent failure became known to the public. At the time, his death was reported as a stroke, but later reports describe that he committed suicide by taking a fatal dose of morphine.

== Personal life and family ==
He married Henrietta K. L. Ebel in Milwaukee, in April 1845, but had no known children. After Kuehn's death in 1865, his bank's creditors hounded his widow trying to recoup their losses. She was forced to sell their mansion and moved to Salt Lake City, Utah. Eventually, she would remarry with her sister's widower, Union Army general Frederick Salomon.

== Electoral history ==
=== Wisconsin Assembly (1848, 1849) ===
Wisconsin Assembly, Manitowoc District Election, 1849
Party	Candidate	Votes	%	±%
General Election, November 6, 1849
Democratic	Charles Kuehn (incumbent)	182	57.96%	
Whig	James L. Kyle	132	42.04%	
Plurality		50	15.92%	
Total votes		314	100.0%	
Democratic hold				

=== Wisconsin Treasurer (1855) ===
Wisconsin State Treasurer Election, 1855
Party	Candidate	Votes	%	±%
General Election, November 6, 1855
Democratic	Charles Kuehn	38,057	53.66%	−3.90%
Republican	Charles Roeser	32,872	46.34%	
Plurality		5,185	7.31%	-12.81%
Total votes		70,929	100.0%	+27.61%
Democratic hold				

Party political offices
Preceded by Edward H. Janssen	Democratic nominee for Treasurer of Wisconsin; 1855	Succeeded by Carl Habich
Wisconsin State Assembly
Preceded by Ezra Durgin	Member of the Wisconsin State Assembly from the Manitowoc County district January 1, 1849 – January 6, 1851	Succeeded by G. C. Oscar Malmros
Political offices
Preceded by Edward H. Janssen	Treasurer of Wisconsin; January 7, 1856 – January 4, 1858	Succeeded by Samuel D. Hastings
