= E. Ray Stevens =

American judge

- portrait of Stevens as a Supreme Court justice

Justice of the Wisconsin Supreme Court
- In office January 1, 1926 – August 25, 1930
- Preceded by: Burr W. Jones
- Succeeded by: George B. Nelson

Wisconsin Circuit Court Judge for the 9th circuit
- In office April 9, 1903 – December 31, 1925
- Appointed by: Robert M. La Follette
- Preceded by: Robert G. Siebecker
- Succeeded by: Herman W. Sachtjen

Member of the Wisconsin State Assembly from the Dane 1st district
- In office January 7, 1901 – January 5, 1903
- Preceded by: George E. Bryant
- Succeeded by: Matthew S. Dudgeon

Personal details
- Born: June 20, 1869 Lake County, Illinois, U.S.
- Died: August 25, 1930 (aged 61) Madison, Wisconsin, U.S.
- Resting place: Forest Hill Cemetery, Madison, Wisconsin
- Party: Republican
- Spouse: Kate S. Sabin (m. 1898–1930)
- Children: Ellen Stevens^{(b. 1900; died 1911)}; Myron R. Stevens^{(b. 1902; died 1994)}; Henry S. Stevens
- Education: University of Wisconsin Law School
- Profession: Lawyer

Edmund Ray Stevens (June 20, 1869 – August 25, 1930) was an American lawyer and judge. He was a justice of the Wisconsin Supreme Court from 1926 until his death in 1930. He previously served 23 years as a Wisconsin circuit court judge and was a member of the Wisconsin State Assembly, representing the city of Madison in the 1901 session.

== Biography ==
Stevens was born Edmund Ray Stevens on June 20, 1869, in Lake County, Illinois. His family later moved to Janesville, Wisconsin. He graduated from the University of Wisconsin Law School in 1895. As a young man, he was a prolific writer on the problems of government and pushing for progressive solutions. He also worked as a special correspondent for the Milwaukee Sentinel, making trips to Europe to report on the urban European perspective.

== Career ==
From 1896 to 1903, Stevens and future U.S. Representative Burr W. Jones operated the law firm Jones & Stevens. Additionally, Stevens was elected to the Wisconsin State Assembly in 1900. In 1903, Stevens was appointed a Wisconsin circuit court judge by Governor Robert M. La Follette. He was elected to the Supreme Court in 1925 and served as a member until his death. During his time with the Supreme Court, he was also a lecturer at the University of Wisconsin Law School.

Stevens died at his home in the Nakoma neighborhood, in Madison, Wisconsin, on the morning of August 25, 1930. He suffered a brief illness that resulted in a heart attack.

== Personal life and family ==
Stevens married Kate Sabin of Windsor, Wisconsin. Sabin was a leading Wisconsin educator; she graduated from the University of Wisconsin in 1893, served as Dane County superintendent of schools, and was the first female Regent of the University of Wisconsin. She also worked as a high school teacher in Stevens Point, Wisconsin, and taught at the Milwaukee-Downer College, where her sister, Ellen Clara Sabin was president. They had three children together, though one died young.

== Electoral history ==
=== Wisconsin Assembly (1900) ===
Wisconsin Assembly, Dane 1st District Election, 1900
Party	Candidate	Votes	%	±%
General Election, November 6, 1900
Republican	E. Ray Stevens	3,468	56.32%	+6.29%
Democratic	George W. Levis	2,569	41.72%	−8.25%
Prohibition	Charles H. Parr	121	1.96%	
Plurality		899	14.60%	+14.54%
Total votes		6,158	100.0%	+28.96%
Republican hold				

=== Wisconsin Supreme Court (1925) ===
1925 Wisconsin Supreme Court election
Party	Candidate	Votes	%	±%
General Election, April 7, 1925
Nonpartisan	E. Ray Stevens	256,431	65.81	
Nonpartisan	John C. Kleist	133,164	34.17	
	Scattering	73	0.02	
Plurality		123,267	31.63	
Total votes		389,668	100	

Wisconsin State Assembly
Preceded by George E. Bryant	Member of the Wisconsin State Assembly from the Dane 1st district January 7, 1901 – January 5, 1903	Succeeded by Matthew S. Dudgeon
Legal offices
Preceded by Robert G. Siebecker	Wisconsin Circuit Court Judge for the 9th circuit April 9, 1903 – December 31, 1926	Succeeded by Herman W. Sachtjen
Preceded by Burr W. Jones	Justice of the Wisconsin Supreme Court; January 1, 1926 – August 25, 1930 (death)	Succeeded by George B. Nelson
