= Romanzo E. Davis =

19th century American politician

Member of the Wisconsin Senate from the 26th district
- In office January 3, 1870 – January 7, 1878
- Preceded by: Carl Habich
- Succeeded by: Matthew Anderson

Personal details
- Born: April 8, 1831 Varysburg, New York, U.S.
- Died: October 31, 1908 (aged 77) Middleton, Wisconsin, U.S.
- Resting place: Middleton Junction Cemetery, Middleton, Wisconsin
- Party: Democratic (after 1877); Reform (1876–1877); Liberal Rep. (1875–1876); Republican (before 1875)
- Spouse: Emrette M. Miltimore (m. 1861–1908)

Romanzo Ellis Davis (April 8, 1831 – October 31, 1908) was an American farmer, politician, and Wisconsin pioneer. He was a member of the Wisconsin Senate for eight years, representing Dane County from 1870 through 1878. He was a Republican, who transitioned to the Liberal Republican faction, and eventually became a Democrat.

== Background ==
Romanzo Davis was born on April 8, 1831, in Varysburg, New York. He was raised and educated there, and moved to Attica in Green County, Wisconsin Territory, in 1846 with his parents. He attended the University of Wisconsin for three years, graduating in 1851, and then later spent some time in business in Cole County, Missouri. He returned to Wisconsin in 1861, first to Cross Plains, where he became a farmer and grain merchant. He moved to Middleton in 1856, becoming active in the shipping of produce and grain from 1863 to 1873.

== Elective office ==
Davis was an unsuccessful independent candidate for the Wisconsin State Assembly in 1864, running in what was then Dane County's 3rd Assembly district.

In 1869 he was elected as a Republican to the Senate's 26th District (the Dane County Towns of Berry, Black Earth, Blue Mounds, Cross Plains, Dane, Fitchburg, Maxomanie, Middleton, Montrose, Perry, Primrose, Roxbury, Springdale, Verona, Vermont and Westport). He was re-elected in 1871. In 1873 he changed his affiliation to Liberal Republican, and was re-elected with 2,019 votes to 1,668 for Republican Assemblyman Phineas Baldwin. He was re-elected once more in 1875 as a member of the Liberal Reform Party, a short-lived coalition of Democratic, reform and Liberal Republicans, and Grangers, receiving 2,662 votes against 1,667 for Republican Assemblyman Sereno W. Graves.

In 1877, Davis was the Democratic nominee (the Liberal Reform coalition having collapsed) for Lieutenant Governor of Wisconsin, but lost his race (although he did better than any other Democratic candidate for state office) to James M. Bingham. The next year, he was the Democratic nominee for the United States House of Representatives in Wisconsin's 2nd congressional district. He lost to incumbent Lucien B. Caswell, a Republican, who polled 12,607 votes to Davis' 9502 and Greenback Horace A. Tenney's 2,376 (Tenney was a former Republican Assemblyman). He was succeeded in the Senate by Matthew Anderson, also a Democrat.

He also served on the board of trustees for the Wisconsin Hospital for the Insane through April 1879.

== After the Senate ==
Davis opened a general store in Middleton in 1879, which he operated until retiring in 1887. He was active in the International Order of Odd Fellows and as a Freemason. Davis died in 1908 and is buried in Middleton.

== Electoral history ==
=== Wisconsin Senate (1869–1875) ===
| Year | Date | Elected | | | | Defeated | | | | Total | Plurality |
|---|---|---|---|---|---|---|---|---|---|---|---|
| 1869 | November 2 | Romanzo E. Davis | Republican | 2,256 | 51.25% | Levi Baker Vilas | Dem. | 2,146 | 48.75% | 4,402 | 110 |
| 1871 | November 7 | Romanzo E. Davis (inc) | Lib. Rep. | 2,021 | 52.85% | Matthew Anderson | Dem. | 1,803 | 47.15% | 3,824 | 218 |
| 1873 | November 4 | Romanzo E. Davis (inc) | Lib. Rep. | 2,019 | 54.76% | Phineas Baldwin | Dem. | 1,668 | 45.24% | 3,687 | 351 |
| 1875 | November 2 | Romanzo E. Davis (inc) | Lib. Rep. | 2,662 | 61.49% | S. W. Graves | Dem. | 1,667 | 38.51% | 4,329 | 995 |

=== Wisconsin Lieutenant Governor (1877) ===
Wisconsin Lieutenant Gubernatorial Election, 1877
| Party | Candidate | Votes | % | ±% |
|---|---|---|---|---|
General Election, November 6, 1877
| Republican | James M. Bingham | 77,926 | 43.12% | −5.84% |
| Democratic | Romanzo E. Davis | 74,656 | 41.31% | −8.34% |
| Greenback | E. H. Benton | 25,745 | 14.25% | |
| Plurality | | 3,270 | 1.81% | +1.11% |
| Total votes | | 180,720 | 100.0% | +5.03% |
| Republican gain from Democratic | | | | |

=== U.S. House of Representatives (1878) ===
Wisconsin's 2nd Congressional District Election, 1878
| Party | Candidate | Votes | % | ±% |
|---|---|---|---|---|
General Election, November 5, 1878
| Republican | Lucien B. Caswell (incumbent) | 12,607 | 51.49% | +1.02% |
| Democratic | Romanzo E. Davis | 9,502 | 38.81% | −10.72% |
| Greenback | Horace A. Tenney | 2,376 | 9.70% | |
| Plurality | | 3,105 | 12.68% | +11.74% |
| Total votes | | 24,485 | 100.0% | +113.67% |
| Republican hold | | | | |

Party political offices
| Preceded by Charles D. Parker | Democratic nominee for Lieutenant Governor of Wisconsin; 1877 | Succeeded by George H. King |
Wisconsin Senate
| Preceded by Carl Habich | Member of the Wisconsin Senate from the 26th district January 3, 1870 – January 7, 1878 | Succeeded by Matthew Anderson |
