= James Kerr Proudfit =

American military officer and politician (1831–1917)

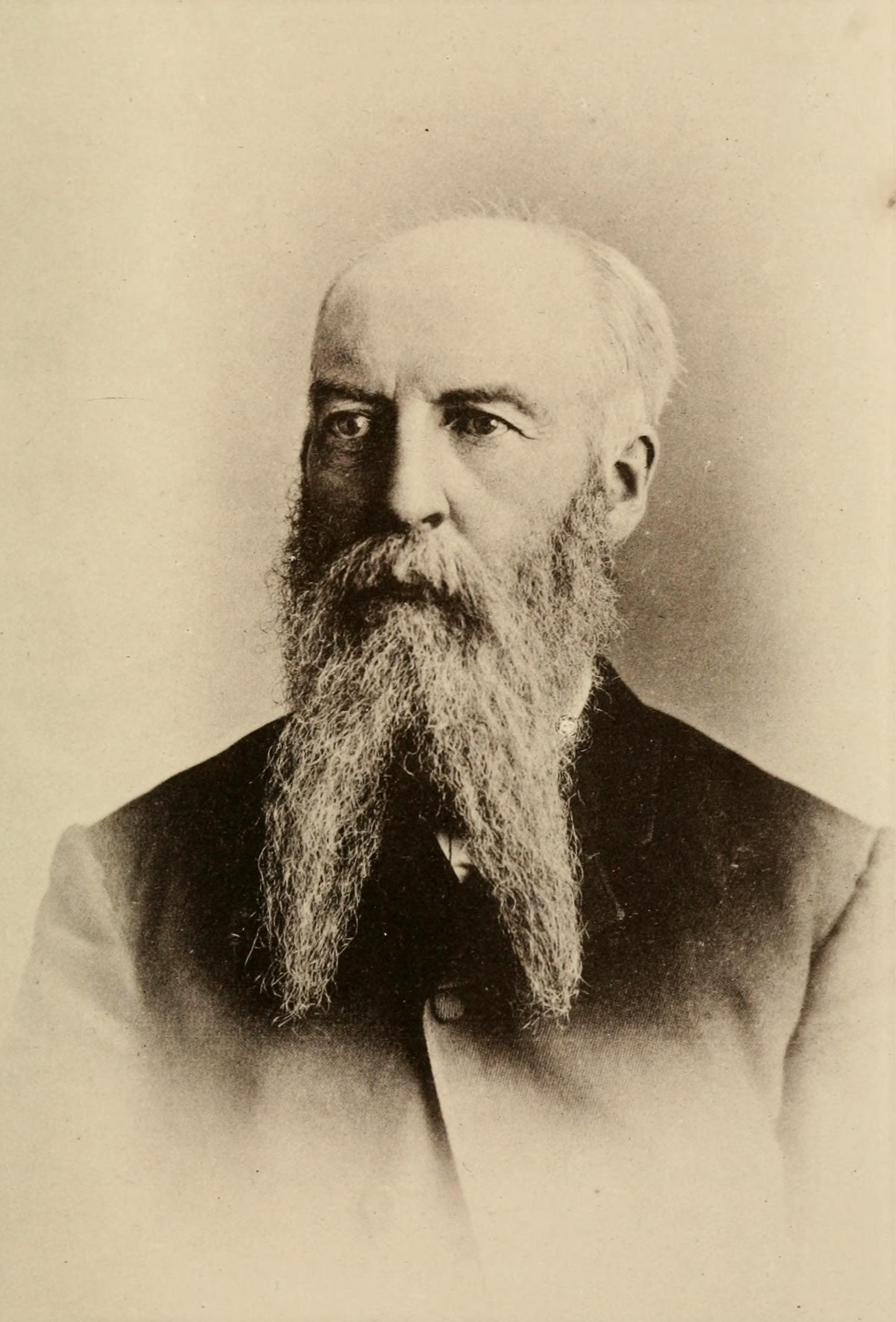
- Portrait from Story of the Service of Company E and the Twelfth Wisconsin Regiment, Veteran Volunteer Infantry, in the War of the Rebellion (1893)

9th Adjutant General of Wisconsin
- In office May 1, 1866 – March 28, 1868
- Governor: Lucius Fairchild
- Preceded by: Augustus Gaylord
- Succeeded by: Edwin E. Bryant

Member of the Wisconsin Senate from the 26th district
- In office January 1, 1866 – January 6, 1868
- Preceded by: Thomas Hood
- Succeeded by: Carl Habich

Personal details
- Born: July 24, 1831 Argyle, New York, U.S.
- Died: May 30, 1917 (aged 85) Kansas City, Kansas, U.S.
- Resting place: Woodlawn Cemetery, Kansas City
- Party: Natl. Union
- Spouse: Emelie Teresa Kreuz (m. 1855; died 1884)
- Children: Theresa (Newhall)^{(b. 1856; died 1935)}; James Delamark Proudfit^{(b. 1858; died 1894)}; Herbert Kerr Proudfit^{(b. 1860; died 1942)}; Isabelle (Miller)^{(b. 1863; died 1940)}; Grace (Gerdes)^{(b. 1869; died 1943)}; Julia Proudfit^{(b. 1871; died 1892)}; 4 others
- Relatives: Andrew Proudfit (brother); Orrin L. Miller (son-in-law)

Military service
- Allegiance: United States
- Branch/service: United States Volunteers; Union Army
- Years of service: 1861–1865
- Rank: Colonel, USV; Brevet Brig. Gen., USV
- Unit: 1st Reg. Wis. Vol. Infantry
- Commands: 12th Reg. Wis. Vol. Infantry
- Battles/wars: American Civil War; Vicksburg campaign; Meridian campaign; Atlanta campaign; Savannah campaign; Carolinas campaign

James Kerr Proudfit (July 24, 1831 – May 30, 1917) was an American military officer, politician, and pioneer of Wisconsin, New Mexico and Kansas. He served in the Union Army throughout the American Civil War, rising to the rank of colonel, and earned an honorary brevet to the rank of brigadier general after the conclusion of the war. He later served as a member of the Wisconsin Senate, adjutant general of Wisconsin, and surveyor general of New Mexico; he was also one of the founders of the Grand Army of the Republic, serving as the first department commander for Wisconsin.

His elder brother, Andrew Proudfit, was also a Wisconsin state senator and the 9th mayor of Madison, Wisconsin. James Proudfit's daughter Isabelle married Orrin L. Miller, who went on to become a U.S. representative and judge in Kansas.

== Early life ==
James Kerr Proudfit was born July 24, 1831, in Argyle, New York. He received his early education in that region of New York. After his father's death in 1839, his elder brother, Andrew Proudfit, took responsibility for the family. Andrew brought the family west to the Wisconsin Territory in 1842, where he obtained a small farm in the town of Brookfield. In 1846, the family moved to Delafield, Wisconsin, where Andrew built a flour mill. James went to work in 1850 as a store clerk in Milwaukee; over the next several years he traveled around the region, working in Manitowoc, Appleton, and Waupun, before returning to Delafield.

In the spring of 1855, he moved to Madison, Wisconsin, where his brother, Andrew, had gone a year earlier. In Madison, Proudfit partnered with Elias A. Calkins to purchase the Argus and Democrat newspaper from Beriah Brown. Proudfit remained only two years with the paper, however, selling his share of the company to George Webb in May 1857.

In 1857, Proudfit's elder brother was elected to the Wisconsin Senate. The following spring, James Proudfit was elected to his first public office, when he was elected city treasurer of Madison.

== Civil War service ==
In the lead-up to the American Civil War, Proudfit became active in the "Governor's Guard", a militia company composed of several of leading Madisonians, including Lucius and Cassius Fairchild. When war broke out in 1861, the Governor's Guard volunteered for service in the Union Army and was enrolled as Company K in the 1st Wisconsin Infantry Regiment; Proudfit was mustered as the company's third ranking officer (referred to as an "ensign" in this case, later referred to as second lieutenant).

The 1st Wisconsin Infantry was sent east to Pennsylvania, then deployed to the vicinity of Hagerstown, Maryland, where they engaged Stonewall Jackson's brigade of Confederate militia at the Battle of Hoke's Run. In this early skirmish, casualties were light and the fighting was indecisive. As the 1st Wisconsin Infantry had only been mustered on a three-month enlistment, they were dismissed back to Wisconsin and mustered out on August 22, 1861.

After returning to Wisconsin, Proudfit re-enlisted for a three year term and was commissioned adjutant of the 12th Wisconsin Infantry Regiment. The 12th Wisconsin Infantry mustered into federal service in October 1861, and was sent south to Kansas, performing guard duty at various points around the state through all of 1862. From February to June 1863, the regiment's commander, Colonel George E. Bryant, was acting brigade commander, and he appointed Proudfit to the role of acting assistant adjutant general. During those months, the brigade was ordered to proceed south and join the Siege of Vicksburg. Shortly after the fall of Vicksburg, the regiment's lieutenant colonel retired and Proudfit was promoted to succeed him; this was considered an unusually fast promotion, as he skipped over the regiment's major and all of its company captains.

In early 1864, the regiment participated in Sherman's Meridian campaign. After that expedition, Proudfit was among the veterans of the regiment sent home to Wisconsin for a brief furlough. At the expiration of the furlough, Sherman summoned all returning veterans to Tennessee; from there, they launched his Atlanta campaign. The 12th Wisconsin assaulted Kennesaw Mountain, then engaged in skirmishes along the Chattahoochee River, fighting over trench lines approaching the city of Atlanta. At various times, Colonel Bryant was again called on to take command of the brigade; Proudfit was left in command of the regiment and subsequently received significant praise for his quick and decisive action. After the fall of Atlanta, the brigade under Bryant was immediately thrown into further combat at the Battle of Jonesborough.

After Jonesborough, they went into camp at Little River, Alabama, where Colonel Bryant resigned, due to the expiration of his three year enlistment. Proudfit took command of the regiment, and was officially promoted to colonel on November 21, 1864. Sherman's March to the Sea commenced on November 15, 1864, with the 12th Wisconsin Infantry in the right wing. After reaching Savannah, they turned north into the Carolinas, capturing several of the major cities en route to the end of the war. The regiment participated in the Grand Review of the Armies in Washington, D.C., then mustered out of service on July 20, 1865. For his meritorious service, Proudfit was granted an honorary brevet to the rank of brigadier general, retroactive to March 13, 1865.

== Post-war career ==
Almost immediately after his return to Wisconsin, the new governor Lucius Fairchild appointed him to serve as assistant adjutant general of Wisconsin. That fall, Proudfit was also nominated by the National Union Party as their candidate for Wisconsin Senate in Wisconsin's 26th Senate district against his own brother, Andrew. The 26th Senate district, at that time, comprised roughly Madison and the western half of Dane County. James Proudfit won the election and served in the 1866 and 1867 legislative terms. While serving as senator, Governor Fairchild also appointed Proudfit to serve as adjutant general of the state; at the same time, Proudfit was active in the organization of the Grand Army of the Republic and was elected the first department commander for Wisconsin. He did not run for re-election in 1867, and resigned as adjutant general in the summer of 1868.

For the next several years, Proudfit engaged in business with the Madison Mutual Insurance Company, but returned to public office in 1872, when he was appointed surveyor general of the New Mexico Territory by President Ulysses S. Grant. He served four years in that role before retiring and moving to Kansas City, Kansas, where he remained for the rest of his life.

James Kerr Proudfit died on May 30, 1917, at the home of his son, Herbert, in Kansas City.

== Personal life and family ==
James Kerr Proudfit was the youngest of four children born to James Proudfit and his wife Maria (née Kerr). James Kerr Proudfit's elder brother, Andrew Proudfit, also was elected to the Wisconsin Senate and became the 9th mayor of Madison, Wisconsin. The Proudfit family were descendants of Andrew Proudfit (or Proudfoot), who emigrated to the Province of Pennsylvania from Scotland about 1750.

On September 20, 1855, James Kerr Proudfit married Emelie Teresa Kreuz, a Bohemian immigrant, at Delafield, Wisconsin. They had ten children, though four died in infancy (including triplets born on March 1, 1866). Another daughter, Julia, died of influenza at age 21. There was apparent family history of mental illness. Proudfit's wife, Emelie, left their home late at night on April 28, 1884, and was not seen again, with some speculating that she committed suicide. Their eldest son, James D. Proudfit, also committed suicide at age 35.

Proudfit's daughter Isabelle (Belle) married Orrin L. Miller at Kansas City in 1883. Miller went on to serve one term in the U.S. House of Representatives, and was then a judge in Wyandotte County, Kansas.

Military offices
Preceded by George E. Bryant	Command of the 12th Wisconsin Infantry Regiment; November 21, 1864 – July 16, 1865	Regiment abolished
Preceded by Augustus Gaylord	Adjutant General of Wisconsin; May 1, 1866 – March 28, 1868	Succeeded by Edwin E. Bryant
Wisconsin Senate
Preceded by Thomas Hood	Member of the Wisconsin Senate from the 26th district January 1, 1866 – January 6, 1868	Succeeded by Carl Habich
