= Burr W. Jones =

American judge and politician (1846–1935)

The Honorable Burr W. Jones
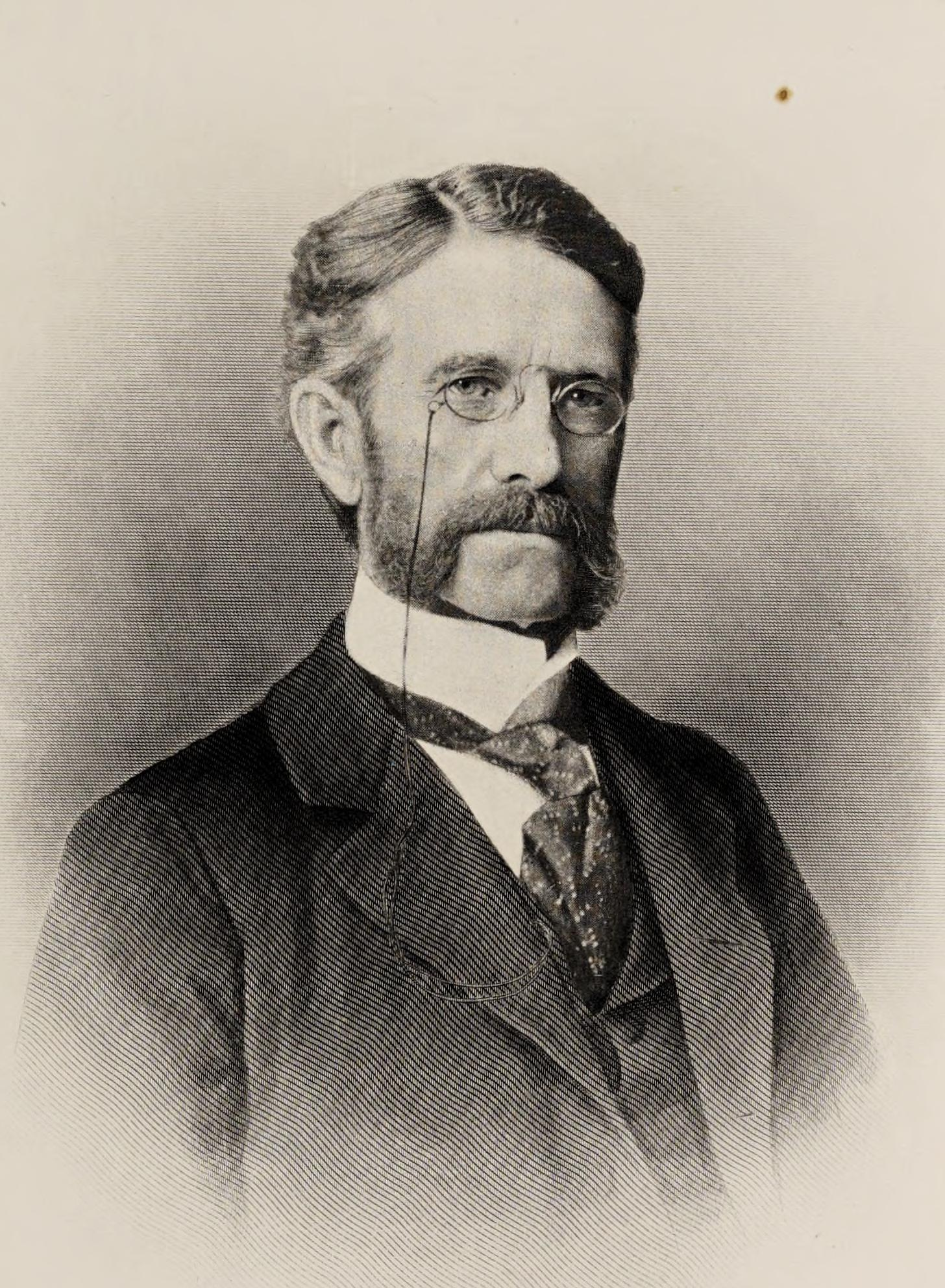

Justice of the Wisconsin Supreme Court
- In office September 6, 1920 – January 1, 1926
- Appointed by: Emanuel L. Philipp
- Preceded by: John B. Winslow
- Succeeded by: E. Ray Stevens

Member of the U.S. House of Representatives from Wisconsin's 3rd district
- In office March 4, 1883 – March 3, 1885
- Preceded by: George Cochrane Hazelton
- Succeeded by: Robert M. La Follette

District Attorney of Dane County
- In office January 1, 1873 – January 1, 1877
- Preceded by: J. C. McKinney
- Succeeded by: W. H. Rogers

Personal details
- Born: March 9, 1846 Union, Wisconsin Territory
- Died: January 7, 1935 (aged 88) Madison, Wisconsin, U.S.
- Resting place: Forest Hill Cemetery; Madison, Wisconsin
- Party: Democratic
- Spouses: Olive L. Hoyt (m. 1873; died 1906); Katharine McDonald (died 1956)
- Children: Marion Burr (Smith); (b. 1883; died 1967)
- Parents: William Jones (father); Sarah M. (Prentice) Jones (mother)

Burr W. Jones (March 9, 1846 – January 7, 1935) was an American lawyer, jurist, and Democratic politician from Dane County, Wisconsin. He served one term in the U.S. House of Representatives, representing Wisconsin's 3rd congressional district for the 48th Congress (1883–1885). Later in life, he served five years as a justice of the Wisconsin Supreme Court, from 1920 through 1925. He was a prominent law professor in Wisconsin, working for more than 30 years at the University of Wisconsin Law School; he also served on the Wisconsin Tax Commission and was president of the State Bar of Wisconsin, and authored a three-volume legal treatise known as Jones on Evidence.

== Biography ==
Born in the Town of Union, in Rock County, Wisconsin Territory. His father and mother had migrated to the Wisconsin Territory from Western Pennsylvania and Western New York, respectively. His father, William Jones, died in 1855, and his mother then married Levi Leonard, a pioneer of Rock County.

Jones was raised on a farm and attended the Evansville Seminary, in Evansville, Wisconsin. He then taught at the school for three years to pay for his university education. He graduated from the literary department of the University of Wisconsin in 1870, and then from the law department in 1871. After leaving the university, he studied law in the office of William Freeman Vilas and was admitted to the State Bar of Wisconsin that year. Near the end of 1871, he began practicing law in Portage, Wisconsin, but within a year moved to Madison. While in Madison, he went through a series of partnerships, with Alden Sprague Sanborn, A. C. Parkinson, F. J. Lamb, and E. Ray Stevens.

In November 1872, Jones was elected district attorney for Dane County, Wisconsin. He was then re-elected in 1874. In 1882, he was elected to the 48th Congress (March 4, 1883 – March 3, 1885) on the Democratic Party ticket in Wisconsin's 3rd congressional district. He was defeated seeking re-election in 1884. In Congress, he served on the House Committee on War Claims, and served as acting Chairman when the chairman was unavailable with a long illness.

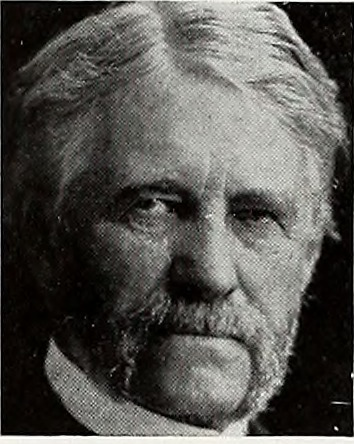

Jones returned to Madison and became a professor of law at the University of Wisconsin for the next thirty years of his life. He remained involved in local affairs and government, serving as City Attorney in 1891, and as chairman of the first Wisconsin Tax Commission in 1897 and 1898.

In 1894 he served as attorney for University of Wisconsin professor Richard T. Ely during the effort to remove Ely for discussing socialism and allegedly holding unpopular views, the controversy which led to the sifting and winnowing statement.

He also remained active with the Wisconsin Democratic Party. He was chairman of the Democratic State convention in 1892, and represented Wisconsin as a delegate to the 1896 Democratic National Convention at Indianapolis, where he was chosen to nominate Edward S. Bragg for president.

In 1920, he was appointed to the Wisconsin Supreme Court by Governor Emanuel L. Philipp, to fill the vacancy created by the death of justice John B. Winslow. In April 1922, Jones was elected to fill the remainder of Winslow's term, which expired in 1926. He did not seek re-election in 1925, and in January 1926 he was replaced by his former law partner E. Ray Stevens.

Jones returned to the practice of law.

== Personal life and family ==
Jones married Olive L. Hoyt in December 1873. They had one daughter together. After the death of his first wife in 1906, he married Katharine McDonald, who survived him.

After thirty years as a professor at the University of Wisconsin Law School, he was conferred a LL.D. in 1916. He was chairman of the Dane County Bar Association and, in 1908, was President of the State Bar Association. In 1896, he published a treatise on the law of evidence in civil cases, followed by two subsequent volumes.

Jones died in a hospital in Madison, on January 7, 1935. He was interred at Madison's Forest Hill Cemetery.

== Legacy ==
One of the Kronshage dormitories at the University of Wisconsin–Madison is named after him, as well as a Madison city park on the Yahara River, and Burr Jones Road in the historic Leonard Leota Park in Evansville, WI.

The television series Profiles in Courage did an episode in 1964 titled "Richard T. Ely" about the "sifting and winnowing" incident. Jones was played by Leonard Nimoy.

== Electoral history ==
=== U.S. House (1882, 1884) ===
Wisconsin's 3rd Congressional District Election, 1882
Party	Candidate	Votes	%	±%
General Election, November 7, 1882
Democratic	Burr W. Jones	13,035	45.98%	+1.70%
Republican	George C. Hazelton (incumbent)	7,924	27.95%	−27.77%
Republican	Elisha W. Keyes	3,791	13.37%	
Prohibition	Samuel D. Hastings	3,152	11.12%	
Greenback	Peter W. Matts	444	1.57%	
	Scattering	2	0.01%	
Total votes		28,348	100.0%	-3.01%

Wisconsin's 3rd Congressional District Election, 1884
Party	Candidate	Votes	%	±%
General Election, November 4, 1884
Republican	Robert M. La Follette	17,433	48.06%	+20.11%
Democratic	Burr W. Jones (incumbent)	16,942	46.71%	+0.73%
Prohibition	John M. Olin	1,885	5.20%	−5.92%
	Scattering	11	0.03%	
Total votes		36,271	100.0%	+27.95%

=== Wisconsin Supreme Court (1922) ===
1922 Wisconsin Supreme Court special election
Party	Candidate	Votes	%	±%
General Election, April 4, 1922
Nonpartisan	Burr W. Jones (incumbent)	268,084	61.27%	
Nonpartisan	John C. Kleist	168,541	38.52%	
	Scattering	928	0.21%	
Total votes		437,553	100.0%	

== See also ==
- Jones, Burr W. The Law of Evidence in Civil Cases. Vol. 1. ISBN 9781334589805.
- Jones, Burr W. (May 28, 2017). The Law of Evidence in Civil Cases. Vol. 2. ISBN 9780282119980.
- Jones, Burr W. The Law of Evidence in Civil Cases. Vol. 3. ISBN 9781334604805.
- United States Congress. "Burr W. Jones (id: J000213)". Biographical Directory of the United States Congress.

U.S. House of Representatives
Preceded by George Cochrane Hazelton	Member of the U.S. House of Representatives from Wisconsin's 3rd congressional district March 4, 1883 – March 3, 1885	Succeeded by Robert M. La Follette, Sr.
Legal offices
Preceded by J. C. McKinney	District Attorney of Dane County, Wisconsin; January 1, 1873 – January 1, 1877	Succeeded by W. H. Rogers
Preceded by John B. Winslow	Justice of the Wisconsin Supreme Court; September 6, 1920 – January 1, 1926	Succeeded by E. Ray Stevens
