= Charles L. Aarons =

American judge (1872–1952)

Wisconsin Circuit Court Judge for the 2nd Circuit, Branch 8
- In office January 4, 1926 – January 2, 1950
- Preceded by: Branch established
- Succeeded by: William I. O'Neill

President of Milwaukee School Board
- In office 1910

Personal details
- Born: August 18, 1872 New York, New York, U.S.
- Died: July 28, 1952 (aged 79)
- Resting place: Spring Hill Cemetery, Milwaukee
- Spouse: Rose Sheuerman (m. 1905; died 1945)
- Children: Lehman Charles Aarons
- Education: University of Wisconsin
- Profession: Lawyer, judge

Charles Lehman Aarons (August 18, 1872 – July 28, 1952) was an American lawyer and judge from Milwaukee, Wisconsin. He served 24 years as a Wisconsin circuit court judge in Milwaukee County, from 1926 to 1950. Prior to that, he served several years on the board of Milwaukee Public Schools, and was president of the school board in 1910.

== Biography ==
Born in New York City, Aarons moved with his family to Milwaukee in 1873. His father succeeded in the wholesale clothing business, and Aarons received a law degree from the University of Wisconsin in 1895. Aarons entered private practice with the Milwaukee firm of Felker, Goldberg, and Felker until 1897. He began his own practice, which he maintained until 1925. During this time, Aarons also served on the Milwaukee School Board from 1903 to 1905 and again from 1908 to 1910. He served as president of the school board in 1910.

In 1925, Aarons was elected to a seat on the Milwaukee County Circuit Court. He was re-elected in 1931, 1937, and 1943. In March 1933, Aarons ordered the Milwaukee elections commission to reinstate 19 election clerks who had been discharged without notice by instruction of a Republican member of the commission, who had learned that none of the clerks could qualify as Republicans. This order was sustained in the Wisconsin Supreme Court. On May 26, 1937, Aarons ruled in the Wrigley Restaurant Case that sit-down strikes were illegal in Wisconsin. On June 12, 1948, Aarons ruled against a Milwaukee radio station, which sought to prevent its former employee, on-air personality Jack Bundy, from billing himself on another station as "Heinie and His Band of Million Airs". Aarons ruled that the name had lost its trade name status through disuse.

Aarons declined to seek reelection in 1949, retiring from the bench entirely on January 2, 1950.

== Personal life ==
Aarons was married to Rose Sheuerman of Des Moines, Iowa, from 1905 until her death in 1945. Throughout his life, Aarons was active in the Milwaukee Jewish community. He was president of his local B'nai B'rith chapter from 1914 to 1915, and supported the Anti-Defamation League, and the American Jewish Committee. After his retirement, he continued to preside over selected cases by appointment of the Wisconsin Supreme Court, until his death. His son, Lehman Charles Aarons, served as a Special Trial Judge for the United States Tax Court from 1975-1986.

Legal offices
New branch established by 1925 Wisconsin Act 5	Wisconsin Circuit Court Judge for the 2nd Circuit, Branch 8 January 4, 1926 – January 2, 1950	Succeeded by William I. O'Neill
