= Edward H. Janssen =

19th century German American Democratic politician, 2nd Wisconsin State Treasurer

2nd State Treasurer of Wisconsin
- In office January 5, 1852 – January 7, 1856
- Governor: Leonard J. Farwell; William A. Barstow
- Preceded by: Jairus C. Fairchild
- Succeeded by: Charles Kuehn

Superintendent of Schools of Ozaukee County, Wisconsin
- In office 1860?-1877

Personal details
- Born: c. 1815 Germany
- Died: 1877 Cedarburg, Wisconsin
- Resting place: Opitz Cemetery; Mequon, Wisconsin
- Party: Democratic
- Relatives: Theodore Janssen (brother)
- Profession: pioneer, teacher, politician

Edward H. Janssen (c. 1815 - 1877) was a German American immigrant, teacher, and pioneer. He was the 2nd State Treasurer of Wisconsin.

== Biography ==
Born in Germany in 1815, Janssen moved to Mequon, Wisconsin in 1840. He was a delegate to the first Wisconsin Constitutional Convention in 1846 and served as Treasurer from 1852 to 1856. In 1853, he helped to build the Concordia Mill, now listed on the National Register of Historic Places. Later, he moved to Cedarburg, Wisconsin and became Superintendent of Schools of Ozaukee County, Wisconsin. He held the position until his death in 1877.

Political offices
Preceded by Jairus C. Fairchild	Treasurer of Wisconsin; 1852–1856	Succeeded by Charles Kuehn
