= Phineas Baldwin =

American politician (1824–1901)

Phineas Baldwin (December 4, 1824 – April 25, 1901) was a member of the Wisconsin State Assembly.

== Biography ==
Baldwin was born on December 4, 1824, in Orford, Canada West. In 1846, he married Mehitable Young. She died in 1853. Baldwin arrived in Dane County, Wisconsin, in 1854, where he became a farmer. The following year, he married Eliza M. Montgomery. He died at his home in Brooklyn, Wisconsin, in 1901.

== Political career ==
Baldwin was a member of the Assembly during the 1872 and 1877 sessions. In 1873 he was the Republican candidate for the Senate's 26th District, losing to incumbent Romanzo E. Davis (a former Republican who had become a Liberal Republican. In 1874, he had been an unsuccessful candidate, losing to incumbent Michael Johnson. Other positions Baldwin held include chairman (similar to Mayor) and member of the Town Board of Oregon (town), Wisconsin, alderman of Madison, Wisconsin, member and Chairman of the Dane County Board of Supervisors and Sheriff of Dane County. He was a Republican.
