= 1922 Wisconsin Supreme Court special election =

- April 4, 1922
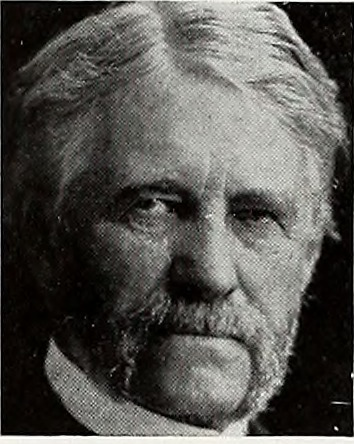

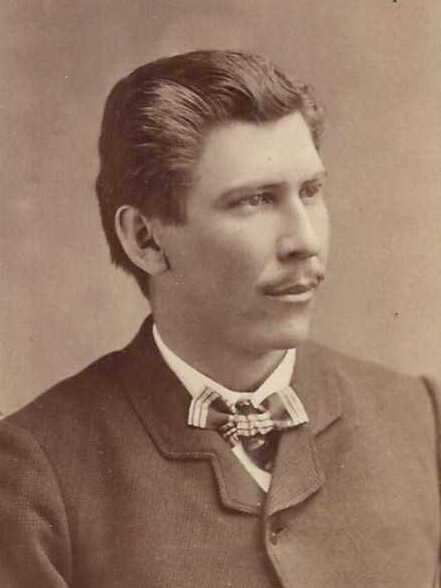
Candidate	Burr W. Jones	John C. Kleist
Popular vote	268,084	168,541
Percentage	61.27%	38.52%
Justice before election
Burr W. Jones
Elected Justice
Burr W. Jones

The 1922 Wisconsin Supreme Court special election was a special election held on Tuesday, April 4, 1922, to elect a justice to the Wisconsin Supreme Court for a partial term. The election took place after the death of John B. Winslow. Incumbent (appointed) justice Burr W. Jones won election.

== Candidates ==
- Burr W. Jones, incumbent justice and former U.S. congressman
- John C. Kleist, Milwaukee attorney and former district attorney of Calumet County (1885–1889)

== Results ==
1922 Wisconsin Supreme Court special election
Party	Candidate	Votes	%
General Election, April 4, 1922
Nonpartisan	Burr W. Jones (incumbent)	268,084	61.27
Nonpartisan	John C. Kleist	168,541	38.52
	Scattering	928	0.21%
Total votes		437,553	100
