= Political endorsement =

Publicly declaring support for a candidate

A political endorsement is a public declaration of one's personal or group's support of a candidate for elected office. In a multiparty system, where one party considers that it does not have enough support to win power, just prior to the election, the official representative of that party may give an official endorsement for a party that they consider more likely to be a contender. In Australian electoral law, "electoral endorsement" is a specific term and a candidate can only be endorsed by a registered party. There are also presidential endorsements.

During a typical election notable endorsements generally come from other politicians and political officeholders (both from the country where the election is being held and as from foreign states), party officials, political operatives, activists and notable public figures (such as political pundits and celebrities), business leaders, organizations (such as activist groups, interest groups, and labor Unions), Newspapers, websites, other media organizations, and other political parties.

Endorsements can generally be used to judge a candidate positions on electoral issues as it provided clues to what it issues it supports or opposes. For example a candidate that is endorsed by environmental groups likely suggests that the candidate supports pro-environmental legislation, whereas a candidate who is endorsed by conservative politicians and is not endorsed by liberal politicians likely suggests that the candidate holds conservative views and stances on issues.

== By journalists ==
According to a 2002 study, editorial endorsements of candidates by newspapers led voters to evaluate endorsed candidates more favorably than candidates who fail to secure an editorial endorsement. An editorial political endorsement of national political races can result in the perception of reduced journalistic objectivity, while endorsement in local political races can be seen non-partisan. Reduced political accountability from journalism is a risk to democracy. Scientific credibility of scientific organizations can be reduced with editorial political endorsements.
