= Andrew Proudfit =

American politician and businessman

Andrew Proudfit (August 3, 1820 – November 12, 1883) was an American politician and businessman.

Proudfit was born in Argyle, New York. In 1843, Proudfit and his family moved to Brookfield, Wisconsin Territory. He worked in the grain and bank business. Proudfit served as chairman of the Delafield Town Board. In 1854, Proudfit moved to Madison, Wisconsin. Proudfit served in the Wisconsin Senate in 1858 and 1859. Proudfit also served as mayor of Madison from 1869 to 1871. Proudfit died at his home in Madison, Wisconsin.
