= Samuel D. Hastings =

American abolitionist and prohibitionist politician

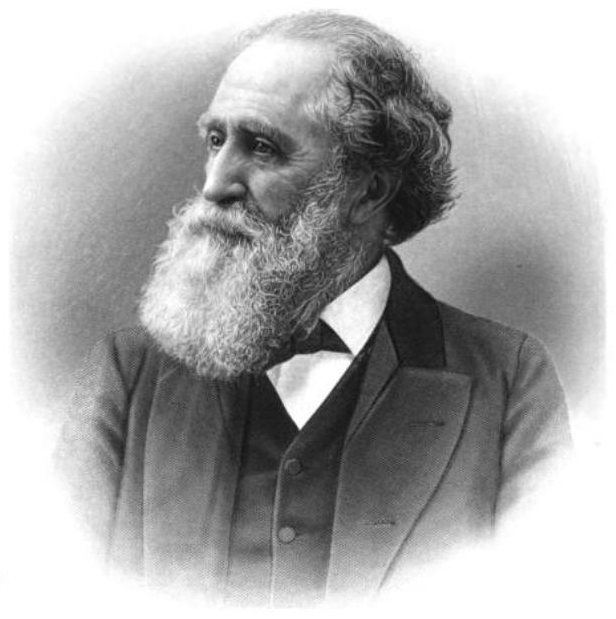

4th State Treasurer of Wisconsin
- In office January 4, 1858 – January 1, 1866
- Governor: Alexander W. Randall; Louis P. Harvey; Edward Salomon; James T. Lewis
- Preceded by: Charles Kuehn
- Succeeded by: William E. Smith

Member of the Wisconsin State Assembly
- In office January 5, 1857 – January 4, 1858
- Preceded by: Position Established
- Succeeded by: Harlow E. Prickett
- Constituency: Buffalo–Jackson–Trempealeau district
- In office January 1, 1849 – January 7, 1850
- Preceded by: Erasmus Richardson
- Succeeded by: Alex S. Palmer
- Constituency: Walworth 3rd district

Personal details
- Born: Samuel Dexter Hastings; July 24, 1816 Leicester, Massachusetts, U.S.
- Died: March 26, 1903 (aged 86) Evanston, Illinois, U.S.
- Resting place: Woodlawn Cemetery; Green Bay, Wisconsin
- Party: Republican; Free Soil (before 1854)
- Spouse: Margaretta Schubert
- Children: Sarah Elizabeth^{(b. 1838; died 1847)}; Emma Margaretta^{(b. 1840; died 1840)}; Samuel Dexter Hastings Jr.^{(b. 1841; died 1931)}; Emma Margaretta (Hobart)^{(b. 1845; died 1914)}; Florence Lydia (Hoyt)^{(b. 1852)}
- Parents: Simon Hastings (father); Betsey (Mackintosh) Hastings (mother)
- Profession: merchant, banker, politician

Samuel Dexter Hastings Sr. (July 24, 1816 – March 26, 1903) was an American businessman, politician, and Wisconsin pioneer. He was the 4th state treasurer of Wisconsin and served two years in the Wisconsin State Assembly.

== Background ==
Hastings was born in Leicester, Massachusetts, on July 24, 1816, to Simon and Betsey Hastings. He is a descendant of the 17th century Massachusetts colonist Thomas Hastings. He moved to Philadelphia, Pennsylvania, where he took part in the anti-slavery movement. In 1846, he moved to the Wisconsin Territory, settling in Geneva.

== Public office ==
In 1849 Hastings he was elected as a Free Soiler, succeeding Democrat Erasmus Richardson. In January he introduced a series of bills calculated to force the hand of Democrats and Whigs, both of which parties were courting the newly successful Free Soilers with an eye towards merger. The "Hastings resolutions", as they came to be called, urged Wisconsin's Representatives and instructed its Senators (then elected by the Legislature) to apply their power and influence to completely break with slavery: to forbid the admission of new slave states, to ban slavery in all federal territories, and to repeal any laws that favored slave labor over free. The tensions revealed by the votes of all three parties on these and related resolutions would eventually lead the Free Soilers to conclude that merger with either of the old parties was an illusion unworthy of pursuit. He was succeeded in the 1850 session by Alexander S. Palmer, a Democrat.

Hastings moved to La Crosse, Wisconsin, and later to Trempealeau.

In 1857, he was again elected to the Assembly, this time as a Republican. He served as Wisconsin State Treasurer from 1858 to 1866, and as a trustee of the State Hospital for the Insane, and in similar positions for other state bodies headquartered in Madison.

In 1884, Hastings (long involved with the temperance movement) ran as the Prohibitionist candidate for Governor of Wisconsin, and in 1892 as a Prohibitionist candidate for the Assembly from Madison.

== Civic activism ==
He was a founding member of the Wisconsin Academy of Sciences, Arts and Letters, and later served as Treasurer of that body.

Hastings argued against the idea that the introduction of the wine-drinking habit into the United States would be a preventative for drunkenness.

He died March 26, 1903, at his daughter's home in Evanston, Illinois. Some of his papers are in the holdings of the Wisconsin Historical Society.

Party political offices
Preceded by Josiah Willard	Free Soil nominee for Treasurer of Wisconsin; 1853	Party abolished
Preceded by Charles Roeser	Republican nominee for Treasurer of Wisconsin; 1857, 1859, 1861, 1863	Succeeded by William E. Smith
Wisconsin State Assembly
Preceded by Erasmus Richardson	Member of the Wisconsin State Assembly from the Walworth 3rd district January 1, 1849 – January 7, 1850	Succeeded by Alex S. Palmer
New district	Member of the Wisconsin State Assembly from the Buffalo–Jackson–Trempealeau district January 5, 1857 – January 4, 1858	Succeeded by Harlow E. Prickett
Political offices
Preceded by Charles Kuehn	Treasurer of Wisconsin; 1858–1866	Succeeded by William E. Smith
