= Roy P. Wilcox =

American politician

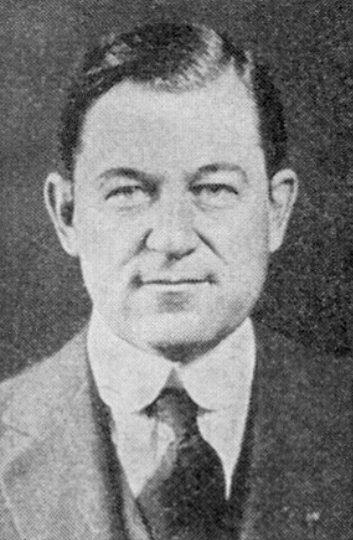

Member of the Wisconsin State Senate
- In office 1917–1920

Personal details
- Born: June 30, 1873 Eau Claire, Wisconsin, US
- Died: May 20, 1946 (aged 72) Eau Claire, Wisconsin, US
- Party: Republican
- Education: Cornell Law School
- Occupation: Lawyer

Roy Porter Wilcox (June 30, 1873 – May 20, 1946) was a member of the Wisconsin State Senate.

== Biography ==
Wilcox was born in Eau Claire, Wisconsin in 1873. He was admitted to the bar in 1896, and graduated from Cornell Law School in 1897. He suffered a serious scalp wound in 1917 while dining at a restaurant. Wilcox died at Sacred Heart Hospital in Eau Claire following a short illness in 1946.

== Political career ==
Wilcox was a member of the Senate from 1917 to 1920. He was twice a candidate for the Republican nomination for Governor of Wisconsin, in 1918 and 1920. In 1925, he was a candidate for the Republican nomination for the United States Senate in a special election following the death of Robert M. La Follette, Sr. He lost to La Follette's son, Robert M. La Follette, Jr.
