= Byron Paine =

19th-century justice of the Wisconsin Supreme Court and military officer

The Honorable Byron Paine
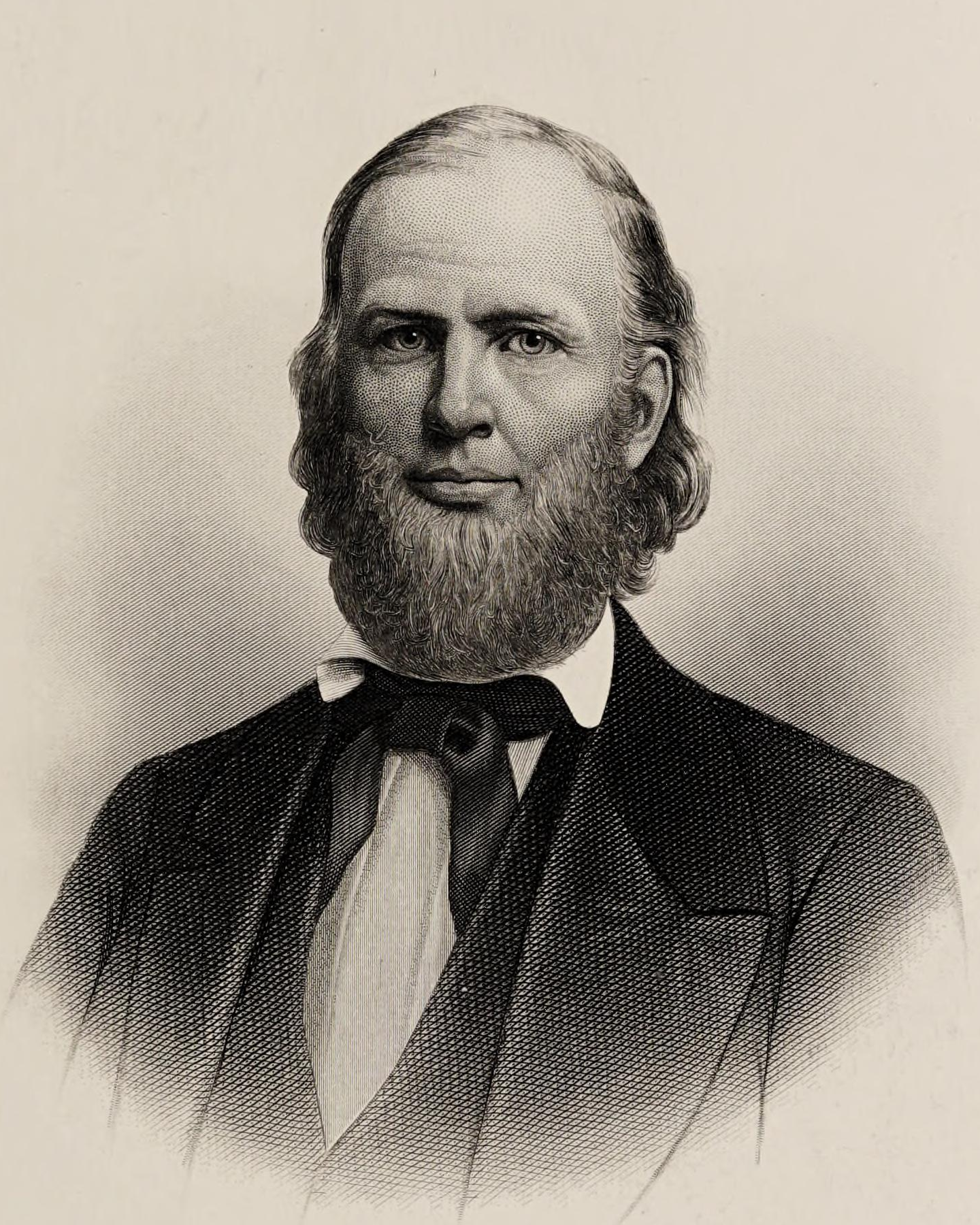

Associate Justice of the Wisconsin Supreme Court
- In office September 1867 – January 13, 1871 (death)
- Appointed by: Lucius Fairchild
- Preceded by: Jason Downer
- Succeeded by: William P. Lyon
- In office June 1, 1859 – August 1864
- Preceded by: Abram D. Smith
- Succeeded by: Jason Downer

Chief Clerk of the Wisconsin Senate
- In office January 9, 1856 – January 14, 1857
- Preceded by: Samuel G. Bugh
- Succeeded by: William Henry Brisbane

Personal details
- Born: October 10, 1827 Painesville, Ohio, U.S.
- Died: January 13, 1871 (aged 43) Monona, Wisconsin, U.S.
- Resting place: Forest Hill Cemetery, Madison, Wisconsin
- Spouse: Clarissa R. Wyman (m. 1854–1871)
- Children: James Percy Paine^{(b. 1856; died young)}; Norman Paine^{(b. 1858; died young)}; Arthur Paine^{(b. 1860; died young)}; Wendell Wyman Paine^{(b. 1862; died 1887)}; George Wyman Paine^{(b. 1866; died 1937)}; Byron Dixon Paine^{(b. 1871; died 1931)}
- Parents: Gen. James H. Paine (father); Marilla Paine (mother)

Military service
- Allegiance: United States
- Branch/service: United States Volunteers; Union Army
- Years of service: 1864–1865
- Rank: Lt. Colonel, USV
- Unit: 43rd Reg. Wis. Vol. Infantry
- Battles/wars: American Civil War: Franklin–Nashville Campaign; Battle of Johnsonville; Battle of Nashville

Byron Paine (October 10, 1827 – January 13, 1871) was an American lawyer, judge, and Wisconsin pioneer. He was a justice of the Wisconsin Supreme Court from 1867 until his death in 1871, and also served on the court from 1859 to 1864, interrupting his judicial service to become an officer in the Union Army during the American Civil War. As a lawyer, he was responsible for two of the most important civil rights cases of early Wisconsin history—He represented abolitionist Sherman Booth in the case of Ableman v. Booth at the Wisconsin Supreme Court, in which the Wisconsin court chose to nullify enforcement of the federal Fugitive Slave Act of 1850. He later represented Ezekiel Gillespie in the 1866 case of Gillespie v. Palmer, which resulted in the Wisconsin Supreme Court extending voting rights to African Americans in Wisconsin.

== Early life and career ==
Paine was born in Painesville, Ohio, to General James H. Paine and Marilla Paine. He moved to Milwaukee in 1847 with his father and studied law. He was admitted to the bar in 1849, and entered a legal partnership, Jas. H. Paine & Sons, with his father and his brother, Hortensius.

As a young lawyer, he was a close friend of the abolitionist Sherman Booth. And in 1854, when Booth was on trial for violating the Fugitive Slave Act, Paine represented him as his lawyer without compensation. Paine argued on his behalf in front of the Wisconsin Supreme Court, in the case of Ableman v. Booth.

At Paine's funeral, Justice Harlow S. Orton remarked that he had, "made one of the clearest, most conclusive and most eloquent arguments against the constitutionality of the fugitive slave law made in any court in the country." Paine won the case and became the only lawyer to successfully argue that fugitive slave laws violated the sovereignty of the northern states. Although the United States Supreme Court did eventually overrule the Wisconsin decision.

Wisconsin Supreme Court Chief Justice Edward George Ryan, who had opposed Paine in the Booth case as attorney for the United States, said of him:

The first opportunity I had of forming an estimate of his high ability, was in the famous case under the fugitive slave act, in 1854 and 1855. He was employed for the defendant; I, for the United States. We both brought to the case, not only ordinary professional zeal, but all the prejudices of all our lives. He was a frank and manly abolitionist. I was as decidedly what was called pro-slavery. We were both thoroughly in earnest... I thought him a fanatic. He probably thought me one. Possibly we both were.

In the 1856 session of the Wisconsin Senate, Paine served as Chief Clerk. In 1857 he was elected Judge in Milwaukee County, where he served until his election to the Wisconsin Supreme Court in 1859.

== Civil War service ==
Paine's term on the Supreme Court was set to expire in 1865, but in the midst of the American Civil War, in 1864, Paine chose to resign from the Court and enlist with the Union Army. He was commissioned as lieutenant colonel for the newly raised 43rd Wisconsin Infantry Regiment, serving under Colonel Amasa Cobb. The regiment was assigned to Tennessee to defend railroad and supply lines, and saw some combat during the Franklin–Nashville Campaign near the end of the war.

== Later years and 2nd Supreme Court term ==
After the Civil War, Paine returned to Milwaukee and resumed practicing law. During this period, he participated in another significant civil rights case, when he represented Ezekiel Gillespie in the 1866 case of Gillespie v. Palmer. Gillespie was a former slave who attempted to vote in Milwaukee in 1865, but was turned away. Paine argued that Wisconsin had granted voting rights to African Americans through an 1849 law and referendum, which had been ignored for the previous 17 years. The Wisconsin Supreme Court ruled in Gillespie's favor, ruling that African Americans had the right to vote in Wisconsin.

In 1867, Jason Downer, who had succeeded Paine on the Wisconsin Supreme Court, resigned. Wisconsin Governor Lucius Fairchild appointed Paine to fill the vacancy. Paine served on the Supreme Court until his death in January 1871.

== Family and personal life ==
Byron Paine was the third of at least four children born to General James H. Paine and his wife Marilla. James Paine was an attorney and newspaper editor, and was an avowed abolitionist. While living in Painesville, Ohio, he was a member of an 1834 citizens committee assigned to investigate the origin of the Book of Mormon—their finding was that it was a fiction.

Byron Paine married Clarissa Wyman in 1854. They had six sons, but only three survived infancy. In addition to his legal pursuits, Paine was an avid reader and enjoyed studying theology.

Paine died at age 44 on January 13, 1871, at his home in Monona, Wisconsin, after suffering for two months from Erysipelas and Pneumonia.

== Electoral history ==
=== Wisconsin Supreme Court (1859) ===
1859 Wisconsin Supreme Court election
Party	Candidate	Votes	%	±%
General Election, April 5, 1859
Republican	Byron Paine	40,500	51.36%	
Democratic	William Pitt Lynde	38,355	48.64%	
Plurality		2,145	2.72%	
Total votes		78,855	100.0%	
Republican gain from Democratic				

=== Wisconsin Supreme Court (1868) ===
1868 Wisconsin Supreme Court special election
Party	Candidate	Votes	%	±%
General Election, April 7, 1868
Nonpartisan	Byron Paine (incumbent)	71,908	52.09%	
Nonpartisan	E. Holmes Ellis	66,143	47.91%	
Plurality		5,765	4.18%	
Total votes		138,051	100.0%	

Wisconsin Senate
Preceded by Samuel G. Bugh	Chief Clerk of the Wisconsin Senate; January 9, 1856 – January 14, 1857	Succeeded by William Henry Brisbane
Legal offices
Preceded by Abram D. Smith	Justice of the Wisconsin Supreme Court; 1859 – 1864	Succeeded by Jason Downer
Preceded by Jason Downer	Justice of the Wisconsin Supreme Court; 1867 – 1871	Succeeded by William P. Lyon
