= 1859 Wisconsin Supreme Court election =

- April 5, 1859
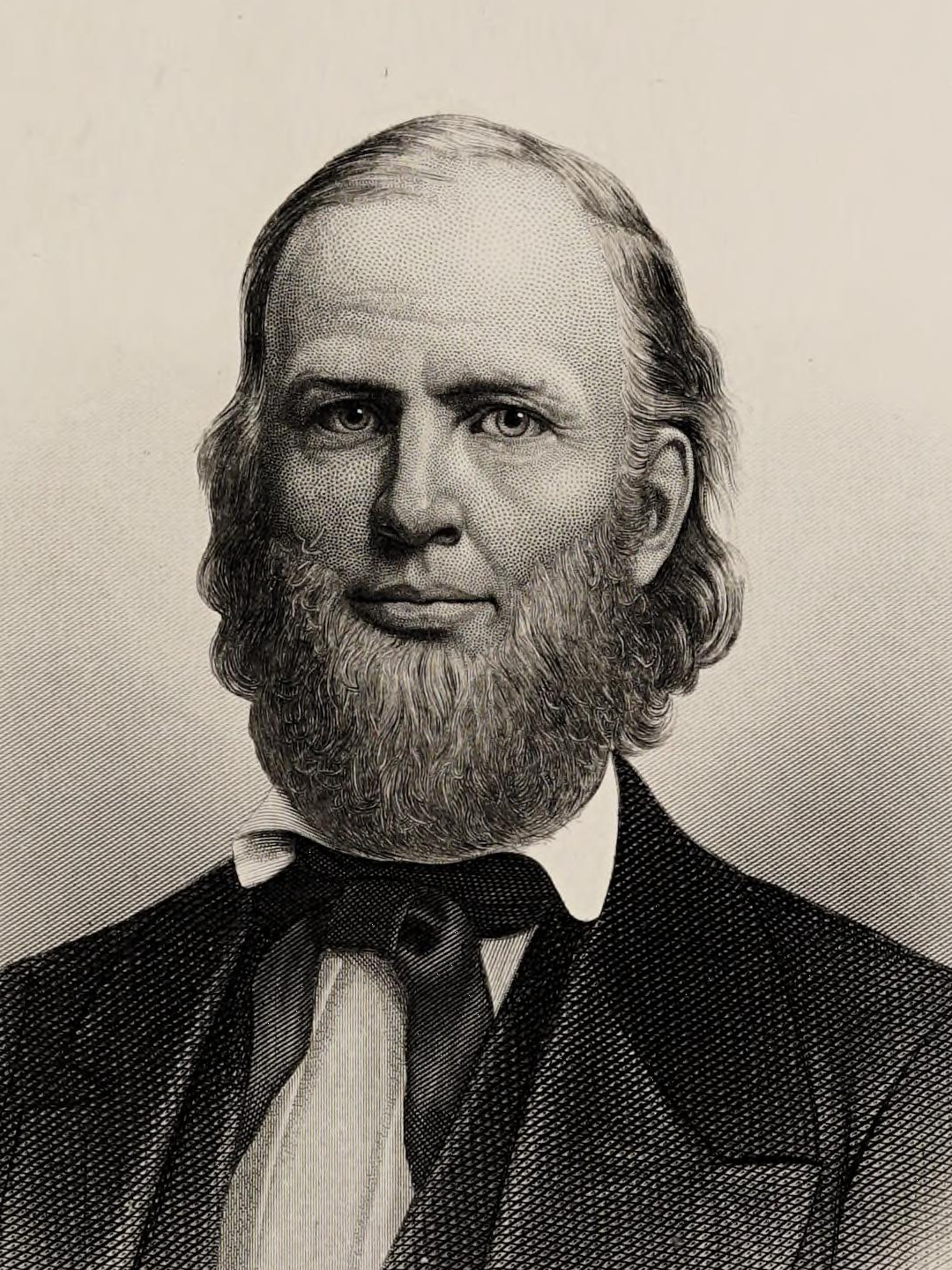

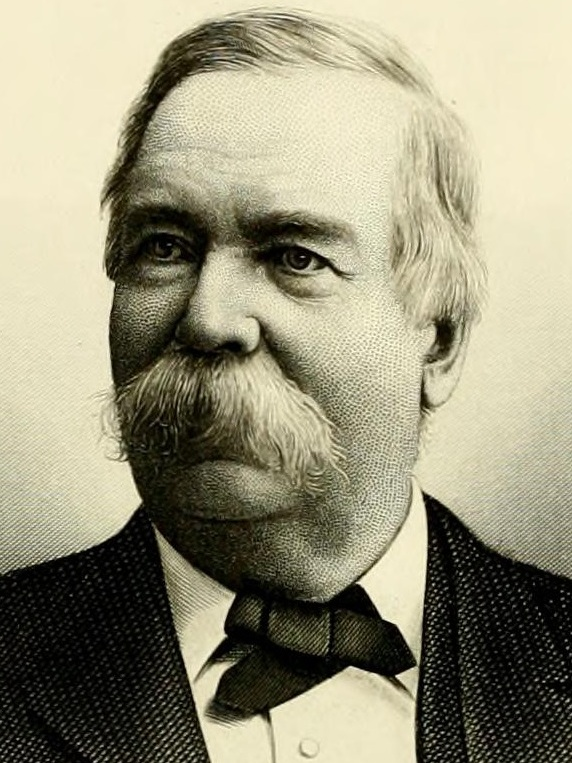
Candidate	Byron Paine	William Pitt Lynde
Party	Republican	Democratic
Popular vote	40,500	38,355
Percentage	51.36%	48.64%
Justice before election
Abram D. Smith
Democratic
Elected Justice
Byron Paine
Republican

The 1859 Wisconsin Supreme Court election was held on Tuesday, April 5, 1859, to elect a justice to the Wisconsin Supreme Court for a full term. Byron Paine was elected to succeed Abram D. Smith.

== Campaign ==
Incumbent justice Abram D. Smith (elected in 1852 as a Democrat) was not re-nominated. However, Republican nominee Byron Paine –who won election– was ideologically aligned with Smith. Smith's most notable opinion had been the majority opinion in In Re: Booth, which ruled against the constitutionality of the Fugitive Slave Act of 1850 (but was overturned by the United States Supreme Court in Ableman v. Booth). In that case, Paine had represented the appellant to the state court (Sherman Booth), whom Smith's decision had found in favor of.

== Result ==
1859 Wisconsin Supreme Court election
Party	Candidate	Votes	%	±%
General Election, April 5, 1859
Republican	Byron Paine	40,500	51.36	
Democratic	William Pitt Lynde	38,355	48.64	
Plurality		2,145	2.72	
Total votes		78,855	100	
Republican gain from Democratic				
