= Lowville =

Lowville can refer to:

== Places ==
United States

- Lowville Township, Minnesota
- Lowville, Minnesota
- Lowville (town), New York
- Lowville (village), New York
- Lowville, Wisconsin, a town
  - Lowville (community), Wisconsin, an unincorporated community
