= 1891 Wisconsin Supreme Court election =

- April 7, 1891
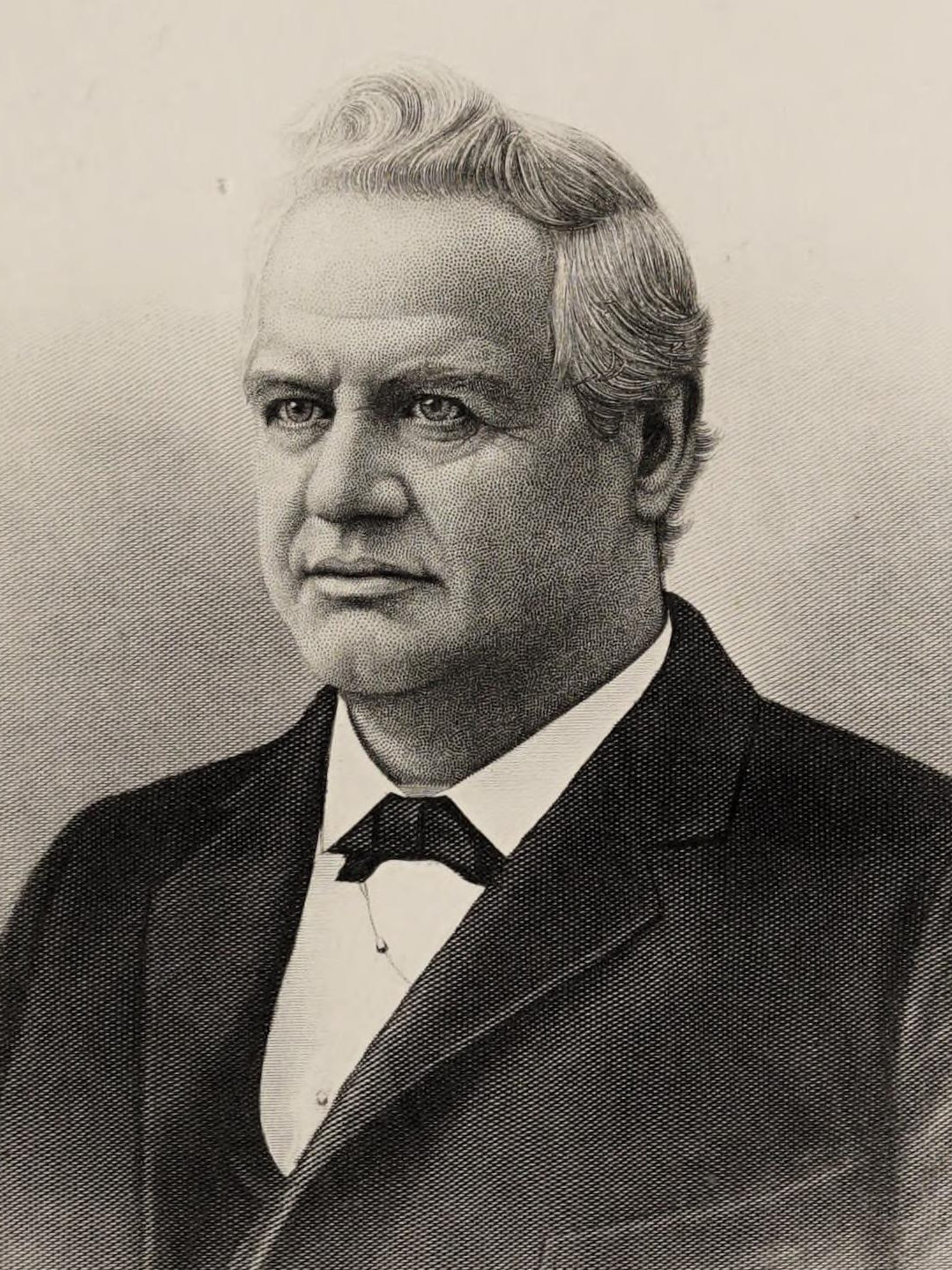

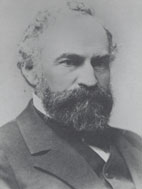
Candidate	Silas U. Pinney	Eleazor H. Ellis
Popular vote	96,661	77,312
Percentage	54.90%	43.91%
Justice before election
Orsamus Cole
Elected Justice
Silas U. Pinney

The 1891 Wisconsin Supreme Court election was held on Tuesday, April 7, 1891, to elect a justice to the Wisconsin Supreme Court for a ten-year term. Silas U. Pinney was elected to succeed retiring justice Orsamus Cole.

== Background ==
The seat contested had originally been created as a chief justice's seat. However a state constitutional amendment ratified in 1889 converted all seats on the court to justices. This change meant that than the chief justice being its own unique seat, the chief justice would simply be selected by seniority (the longest-serving justice would be the chief justice). This change meant that the seat up for election was no longer different from the other seats on the court.

== Campaign ==
Incumbent justice Orsamus Cole (the chief justice) did not seek re-election to the seat. In 1890, when it was already rumored that Cole would likely retire rather than seek re-election, Silas U. Pinney was discussed as a top contender to succeed him. Pinney had previously been the Democratic nominee in the 1869 attorney general election, before which he had been widely rumored as a possible candidate in the 1868 Supreme Court election. Pinney formally launched his candidacy in December 1890, and quickly secured a vast majority of support from within the state and regional bar associations. His campaign had strong support from Republicans, but struggled to secure unified support from Democrats. Catholic leaders in the Democratic Party initially sought to organize against his candidacy, accusing Pinney of supporting the use of the protestant bible in school instruction, but Pinney eventually placated Catholic groups and earned their endorsements. The last lingering opposition to his candidacy came from the Democrats running the Milwaukee Journal, who took issue with Pinney's legal representation of the Republican former state treasurers Edward C. McFetridge and Henry B. Harshaw (who had both faced a politically-charged prosecution from Democratic attorney genera James L. O'Connor over alleged embezzlement).

Democratic discontent with Pinney ultimately motivated the candidacy of Eleazor H. Ellis (a circuit judge). Ellis ran a strong campaign, but Pinney ultimtaley prevailed with 55% of the vote.

== Result ==
1891 Wisconsin Supreme Court election
Party	Candidate	Votes	%
General Election, April 7, 1891
Nonpartisan	Silas U. Pinney	96,661	54.90
Nonpartisan	Eleazor H. Ellis	77,312	43.91
	Scattering	2,082	1.18
Total votes		176,055	100
