= Mary H. C. Booth =

American poet and abolitionist (1831–1865)

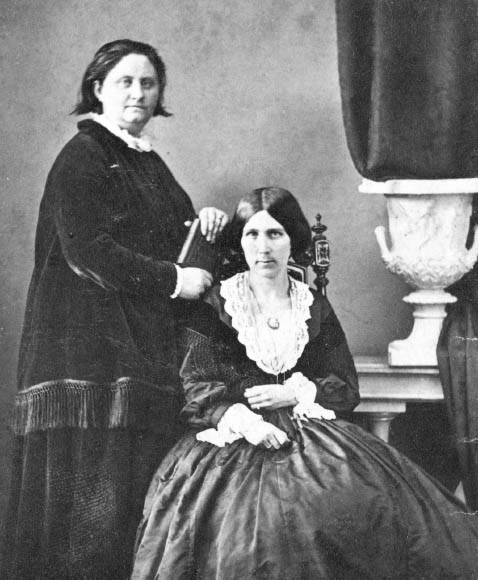
- Mary Booth (sittende) med Mathilde Franziska Anneke
- Born: 1831; Connecticut
- Died: April 11, 1865 (aged 33–34); New York City
- Occupation: Poet
- Spouse(s): Sherman Booth
- Partner(s): Mathilde Franziska Anneke

Mary Humphrey Corss Booth (1831 – April 11, 1865) was an American poet and abolitionist. She published the collection Wayside Blossoms Among Flowers from German Gardens (1865).

Mary Humphrey Corss was born in 1831 in Connecticut, the daughter of John and Adelaide Corss. She was visiting relatives in Milwaukee, Wisconsin when she met Sherman Booth, tma recently widowed abolitionist journalist and speaker. Over the objections of her parents and only two months after the death of his first wife, the 18-year-old Corss and the 36-year-old Booth married in 1849. They had three daughters: Mary Ella, Alice, and Lillian May. Alice died in infancy.

In February 1859, Sherman Booth was accused of rape by a fourteen-year-old babysitter. The resulting trial ended in a hung jury, and the Booth marriage was functionally over. The next March, Sherman Booth was arrested for assisting in the escape of fugitive slave Joshua Glover. Mary Booth helped organize two failed attempts to forcibly free Sherman Booth from prison before leaving him and the United States in June 1860.

Booth moved to Zurich with one of her daughters and the German writer, radical, and feminist Mathilde Franziska Anneke. Booth and Anneke enjoyed a romantic relationship, the exact nature of which has been debated. They worked as freelance journalists and collaborated on an unpublished anthology of abolitionist stories. In June 1864, Booth and her daughter returned to the United States due to Booth's worsening tuberculosis and desire to be reunited with her family.

Booth lived in a New York City boarding house and died on April 11, 1865.
