= Lowville Township, Murray County, Minnesota =

Lowville Township, Minnesota
- Township
- Location within the state of Minnesota Lowville Township, Minnesota (the United States)
- Coordinates: 44°3′31″N 95°52′25″W
- Country: United States
- State: Minnesota
- County: Murray

Area
  - Total: 36.0 sq mi (93.2 km^{2})
  - Land: 35.8 sq mi (92.8 km^{2})
  - Water: 0.15 sq mi (0.4 km^{2})
- Elevation: 1,600 ft (500 m)

Population (2000)
  - Total: 175
  - Density: 4.9/sq mi (1.9/km^{2})
- Time zone: UTC-6 (Central (CST))
  - Summer (DST): UTC-5 (CDT)
- FIPS code: 27-38402
- GNIS feature ID: 0664834

Lowville Township is a township in Murray County, Minnesota, United States. The population was 175 at the 2000 census.

== History ==
Lowville Township was organized in 1873, and named for brothers John and Bartlett Low, early settlers. Bartlett Marshall Low served in the 42nd Wisconsin Infantry Regiment during the American Civil War and then served in the Minnesota House of Representatives.

== Geography ==
According to the United States Census Bureau, the township has a total area of 36.0 square miles (93.2 km^{2}), of which 35.8 square miles (92.8 km^{2}) is land and 0.1 square mile (0.4 km^{2}) (0.39%) is water. It is home to the Bear Lake Woods.

== Demographics ==
As of the census of 2000, there were 175 people, 70 households, and 52 families residing in the township. The population density was 4.9 inhabitants per square mile (1.9/km^{2}). There were 75 housing units at an average density of 2.1 per square mile (0.81/km^{2}). The racial makeup of the township was 98.86% White, 0.57% Asian, and 0.57% from two or more races.

There were 70 households, out of which 35.7% had children under the age of 18 living with them, 67.1% were married couples living together, 4.3% had a female householder with no husband present, and 25.7% were non-families. 21.4% of all households were made up of individuals, and 4.3% had someone living alone who was 65 years of age or older. The average household size was 2.50 and the average family size was 2.87.

In the township the population was spread out, with 24.0% under the age of 18, 7.4% from 18 to 24, 26.3% from 25 to 44, 31.4% from 45 to 64, and 10.9% who were 65 years of age or older. The median age was 37 years. For every 100 females, there were 118.8 males. For every 100 females age 18 and over, there were 125.4 males.

The median income for a household in the township was $39,688, and the median income for a family was $47,500. Males had a median income of $28,125 versus $17,000 for females. The per capita income for the township was $15,699. About 3.8% of families and 5.3% of the population were below the poverty line, including none of those under the age of eighteen or sixty five or over.

== Politics ==
Lowville Township is located in Minnesota's 1st congressional district, represented by Brad Finstad, a Republican. At the state level, Lowville Township is located in Senate District 22, represented by Republican Doug Magnus, and in House District 22A, represented by Republican Joe Schomacker.
