= List of former lakes of Minnesota =

- Lake Agassiz
- Glacial Lake Aitkin
- Bear Lake, in Lowville Township, Minnesota was actually a wooded area with four lakes: Bear Lake proper, Crooked Lake, Hawk or Rush Lake, and Tibbetts or Great Oasis Lake. These lakes and surrounding wetlands, a total of 6,000 acres (24 km^{2}), were drained in 1915.
- Central Lake, in Murray County, Minnesota east of Lime Creek
- Glacial Lake Duluth
- Glacial Lake Grantsburg
- Glacial Lake Minnesota
- Rat Lake, in Westbrook Township, Minnesota, west of Bean Lake and Double Lake
- Glacial Lake Upham
