= Marshall C. Nichols =

American politician

Marshall C. Nichols was a member of the Wisconsin State Assembly.

== Biography ==
Nichols was born on January 17, 1838, in Hancock County, Illinois. During the American Civil War, he was a captain with the 42nd Wisconsin Volunteer Infantry Regiment of the Union Army. He was a merchant by trade.

On September 11, 1867, Nichols married Hettie M. Rusk. They would have six children. Hettie was a National Secretary of the Woman's Relief Corps and niece of Jeremiah McLain Rusk. Jeremiah was a brevet brigadier general before becoming a member of the United States House of Representatives, the 15th Governor of Wisconsin and the 2nd United States Secretary of Agriculture. Nichols died on April 8, 1906.

== Assembly career ==
Nichols was a member of the Assembly in 1883. He was a Republican.
