= Eleazor H. Ellis =

Wisconsin pioneer and politician (1826–1906)

The Honorable Eleazor H. Ellis
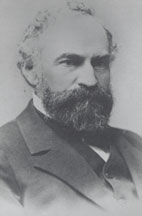

Wisconsin Circuit Court Judge for the 10th Circuit
- In office January 1, 1872 – January 1879
- Preceded by: Ezra T. Sprague
- Succeeded by: George H. Meyers

6th Mayor of Green Bay, Wisconsin
- In office April 1860 – April 1861
- Preceded by: Nathan Goodell
- Succeeded by: Henry S. Baird

Personal details
- Born: Eleazor Holmes Ellis; August 26, 1826 Brown County, Michigan Territory, U.S.
- Died: December 9, 1906 (aged 80) Green Bay, Wisconsin, U.S.
- Resting place: Woodlawn Cemetery, Green Bay, Wisconsin
- Party: Democratic
- Spouses: Harriet Sovina Gilbert (m. 1850; died 1854); Eliza D. Chappel (m. 1858; died 1878); Ruth K. Gillette (m. 1881–1906)
- Children: with Harriet Gilbert; Albert Gallatin Ellis^{(b. 1851; died 1888)}; Gilbert Ellis^{(b. 1852; died 1860)}; with Eliza Chappel; Virginia Ellis^{(b. 1859; died 1865)}; Ruth Ellis^{(b. 1861; died 1905)}; Frank Holmes Ellis^{(b. 1863; died 1884)}; Grace Ellis^{(b. 1865; died 1886)}; Frederick Wolcott Ellis^{(b. 1867; died 1867)}; Jenny May Ellis^{(b. 1871)}; James Wolcott Ellis^{(b. 1874; died 1952)}
- Parents: Albert Gallatin Ellis (father); Pamela (Holmes) Ellis (mother)
- Relatives: Frederick S. Ellis (brother)

Eleazor Holmes Ellis (August 26, 1826 – December 9, 1906) was an American lawyer, Democratic politician, and Wisconsin pioneer. He was the 6th mayor of Green Bay, Wisconsin, (1860) and served seven years as a Wisconsin circuit court judge (1872–1879). His name was sometimes abbreviated as E. Holmes Ellis or E. H. Ellis.

Ellis was one of the first American children born in what is now Wisconsin. He was the eldest child of surveyor Albert Gallatin Ellis, who was one of the first American settlers in Wisconsin.

== Family ==
Eleazor Holmes Ellis was born on his father's farm in what was later known as Preble, Wisconsin, now part of Green Bay, Wisconsin. At the time of his birth, it was unorganized land of Brown County in what was then the Michigan Territory. Eleazor and his siblings were some of the earliest colonist children born within the boundaries of what would become the state of Wisconsin. His father, Albert Gallatin Ellis, was the publisher of the Green Bay Intelligencer—the first newspaper published west of Lake Michigan. Albert G. Ellis was also Mayor of Stevens Point, Wisconsin, at the same time that Eleazor was Mayor of Green Bay.

Eleazor's younger brother, Frederick S. Ellis, was also active in politics, serving in the Wisconsin State Assembly and Senate, and also later serving as Mayor of Green Bay.

Eleazor married three times and had a total of nine children. In 1850, Ellis married Harriet Sovina Gilbert. They had two children before she died in 1854. Ellis then married Eliza D. Chappel in 1858. They had seven children before her death in 1878. In 1881, he married Ruth K. Gillette.

Ellis died from old age in 1906 and was interred at Green Bay's Woodlawn Cemetery.

== Career ==
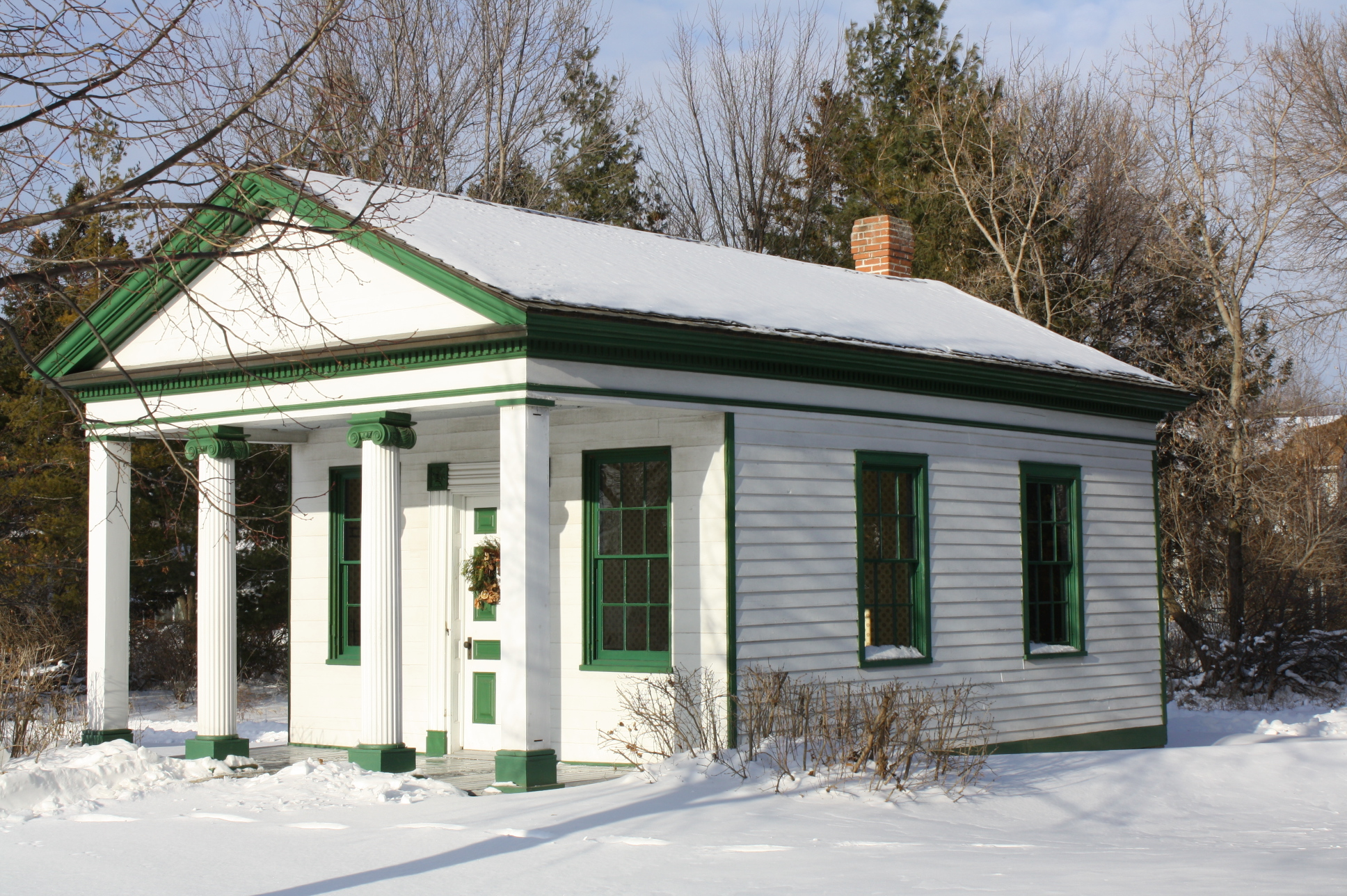
Baird Law Office at Heritage Hill

Ellis studied law under Henry S. Baird, who had been Attorney General of the Wisconsin Territory. He was admitted to practice law in the Wisconsin Territory at age 21, in 1847, and opened an office in Manitowoc. In 1851, he returned to Green Bay. Over the next twenty years he was a successful lawyer in the city forming a series of partnerships—with William H. Norris, George G. Greene, Samuel D. Hastings, W. J. Green, and H. J. Fenbee.

Ellis was elected Wisconsin circuit court judge in 1871, without opposition, and served seven years, resigning in 1879 due to poor health and low wages. He was an unsuccessful candidate for the Wisconsin Supreme Court in 1868 and 1891. Ellis served as Mayor of Green Bay in 1860. Later, he was Postmaster of Green Bay from 1896 to 1900 and Register of Deeds of Brown County, Wisconsin.

== Electoral history ==
=== Wisconsin Supreme Court (1868) ===
1868 Wisconsin Supreme Court special election
Party	Candidate	Votes	%	±%
General Election, April 7, 1868
Nonpartisan	Byron Paine (incumbent)	71,908	52.09%	
Nonpartisan	E. Holmes Ellis	66,143	47.91%	
Plurality		5,765	4.18%	
Total votes		138,051	100.0%	

=== Wisconsin Supreme Court (1891) ===
1891 Wisconsin Supreme Court election
Party	Candidate	Votes	%	±%
General Election, April 7, 1891
Nonpartisan	Silas U. Pinney	96,661	54.90%	
Nonpartisan	Eleazor H. Ellis	77,312	43.91%	
	Scattering	2,082	1.18%	
Plurality		19,349	10.99%	
Total votes		176,055	100.0%	

Political offices
Preceded by Nathan Goodell	Mayor of Green Bay, Wisconsin; 1860 – 1861	Succeeded by Henry S. Baird
Legal offices
Preceded by Ezra T. Sprague	Wisconsin Circuit Court Judge for the 10th Circuit; 1872 – 1879	Succeeded by George H. Meyers
