= Ezekiel Gillespie =

African-American civil rights activist (1818–1892)

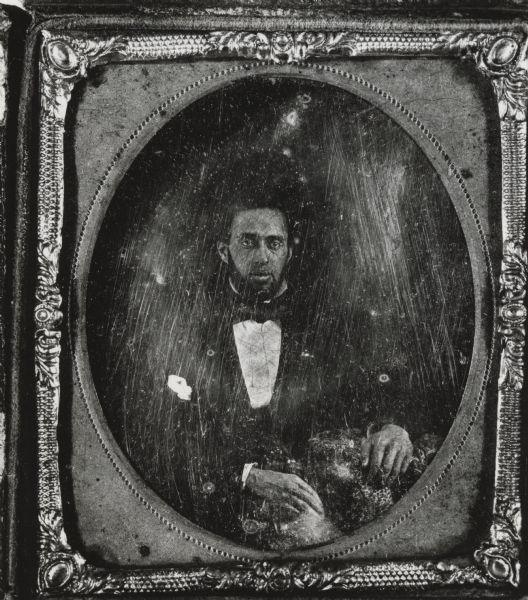
Ezekiel Gillespie, c. 1850

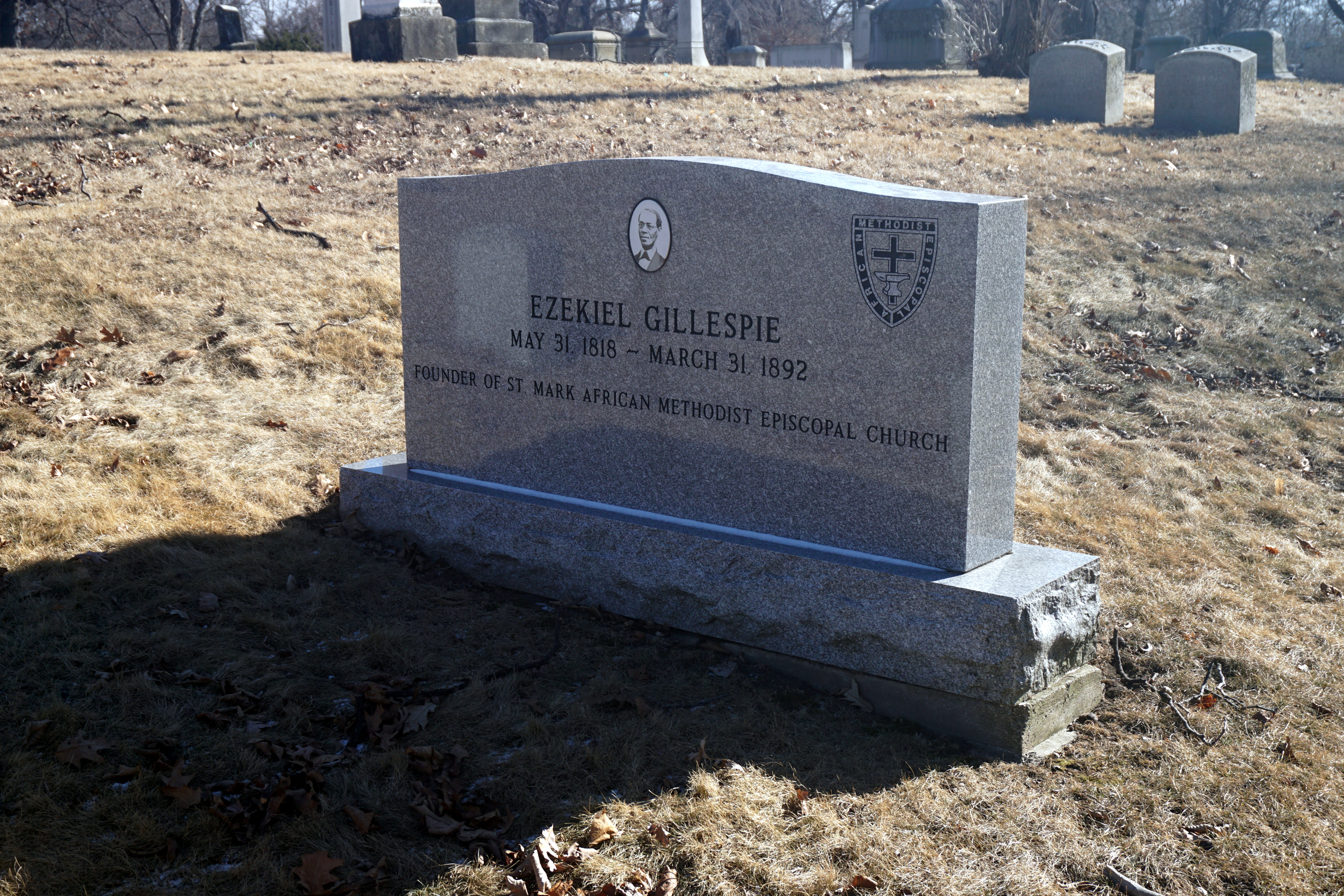
Catherine and Ezekiel Gillespie graves at Forest Home Cemetery

Ezekiel Gillespie (May 31, 1818 – March 31, 1892) was an African-American civil rights and community leader who won a landmark case securing voting rights in Wisconsin.

Gillespie was born a slave in Canton, Mississippi or Greene County, Tennessee, probably the son of an African-American slave and her European-American slave owner. As a young man he purchased his own freedom for $800. He traveled to Indiana, and soon moved to Milwaukee, Wisconsin, where he sold groceries and then worked as a railroad porter. He quickly became a leader in the African-American community. He operated a local branch of the Underground Railroad, pushed Richard Allen to open Wisconsin's first African-American church, and also played a role in the Joshua Glover controversy.

In 1865, at the insistence of Sherman Booth, Gillespie attempted to vote. He was denied a ballot, so he sued the Board of Elections. Gillespie v. Palmer went all the way to the Wisconsin Supreme Court. The justices of the court sided with Gillespie, in his argument that Wisconsin voters had voted in favor of male African American suffrage in an 1849 referendum. He was the first Black voter in Wisconsin.

Gillespie later moved to Chicago, Illinois, where he died on March 31, 1892. His remains were brought back to Milwaukee to be buried in Forest Home Cemetery alongside some of Milwaukee's most famous residents.
