= 43rd Wisconsin Infantry Regiment =

Union Army infantry regiment

- Flag of Wisconsin
- Active: August 8, 1864 – June 20, 1865
- Country: United States
- Allegiance: Union
- Branch: Infantry
- Size: Regiment
- Engagements: American Civil War: Battle of Johnsonville; Battle of Nashville

Commanders
- Colonel: Amasa Cobb
- Lt. Colonel: Byron Paine

The 43rd Wisconsin Infantry Regiment was a volunteer infantry regiment that served in the Union Army during the American Civil War.

== Service ==
The 43rd Wisconsin was organized at Madison, Wisconsin and mustered into Federal service by companies between August 8 and September 30, 1864.

The Forty-Third Infantry, like the Forty-Second, entered the service under the President's call of July 18, 1864. The regiment rendezvoused at Milwaukee. Amasa Cobb, then member of Congress from the Third District, and formerly Colonel of the Fifth Wisconsin, was appointed Colonel and Byron Paine, Chief Justice of the Supreme Court, Lieutenant Colonel. The first company was mustered in August 8 and the last October 8, 1864. The following day they left the State, and proceeded to Nashville. The roster was as follows:

Colonel - Amasa Cobb Lieut. Colonel - Byron Paine Major - Samuel B. Brightman Adjutant - Alvin F. Clark Quartermaster - John B. Eugene Surgeon - James M. Ball 1st Asst. Surgeon - Charles C. Hayes 2d Asst. Surgeon - Thomas Beach Chaplain - John Walworth

Co. Captains First Lieutenants Second Lieutenants A- E. D. Lowry William Partridge Charles M. Day B- George K. Shaw Hiram H. Lockwood Lloyd V. Nanscawen C- George Campbell Levi Welden John Brandon D- Josiah Hinman Morgan O'Flaherty Francis A. Smith E- Isaac Stockwell Chas. J. Wadsworth George W. Witter F- John S. Wilson John E. Davis Henry Harris G- Bruce E. McCoy Arthur T. Morse C. W. Allen H- William W. Likens Elijah Lyon Thomas O. Russell I- George Jackson A. D. Miller Orrin L. Ingman K- R. A. Gillett John W. Howard Charles Lemke

From Nashville the regiment moved by rail to Johnsonville, the terminus of the Government railroad which had been built to convey supplies from Nashville to the Tennessee River. Here they performed guard and garrison duty details, being sent daily to guard railroad trains to Nashville. Colonel Cobb was appointed commander of the post and Lieutenant Colonel Paine took command of the regiment. At that time vast amounts of army supplies of all kinds were passing through Johnsonville to Nashville, being brought up the Tennessee on transports and then shipped by rail. November 4 the rebels attacked the gun boats below the town, drove them up to Johnsonville, planted a six-gun battery and opened fire upon the place and the boats. The officers of the latter, with reason or without reason, deemed it necessary to abandon and burn them. Soon after the transports barges and Government buildings were also fired by the federals and property worth several millions of dollars was destroyed to prevent its falling into the enemy's hands. The burning of so many boats and buildings was a conflagration indescribably grand, which added to the explosion of ammunition upon the boats and in the depot and the roar of artillery from the combatants between whom a battle, meanwhile, was raging, produced a terrific scene. On the morning of the 5th, the firing was renewed but the rebels soon withdrew. During the engagement the Forty-Third lay in the trenches protected by earth-works from the enemy's shot, being unable to aid in the battle because it was wholly an artillery fight. They had two men killed and one wounded. November 30, Johnsonville was evacuated and the troops ordered to move with all possible dispatch to Nashville to resist Hood. Marching by day and night in an almost unbroken wilderness, through deep mud and drenching rains, and guarding an immense train, they learned on the third day that they were cut off from Nashville. They were then ordered to turn toward Clarksville which they reached December 5 and there encamped until the 28th. At that date they embarked for Nashville and January 1, 1865, moved south by rail to Decherd, a station on the road to Chattanooga. Here six companies encamped and four, under command of Major Brightman, were detached to guard the Elk River bridge. The regiment remained at these points, guarding the railroad and awing the guerrillas of the country until the close of the war. While at Decherd they laid out a cemetery for their own and other deceased soldiers, erected a monument with a suitable inscription in raised letters and dedicated all with solemn religious services conducted by their chaplain. They were called to bury many of their number in Tennessee. Early in June the regiment moved to Nashville and on the 24th were mustered out. They soon after returned to Milwaukee where they were paid and disbanded. Colonel Cobb was brevetted brigadier general for meritorious services during the war. Lieutenant Colonel Paine was constrained in consequence of the death of a brother, to resign a short time before the discharge of the regiment. He was in command during most of their service, Colonel Cobb being engaged on detached duty. The soldiers were deeply affected when it was announced that he was to leave. He united kindness and firmness in discipline. It is the unanimous testimony of the officers of the regiment that never did the humblest soldier, however great his delinquency, receive from Lieutenant Colonel Paine an unkind or ungentlemanly word. "Without ostentation and with great singleness of purpose he devoted himself to the welfare of his regiment and the good of the service. Conceding nothing to ambition, nothing to any personal consideration, he moved straight wherever duty led undeterred by censure and unmoved by applause anxious only to be right." Rarely has the service been blessed with an officer of so pure morals and so sincere a purpose. The only new appointments that appear the muster-out roster are the following: John E. Davis, Adjutant; C. C. Hayes, Surgeon; Henry H. Ruger, First Assistant Surgeon; G. Witter, First Lieutenant of Company E, and Alvin F. Clark of Company F; James H. McHenry, Second Lieutenant of Company A., and George P. Gennett, of Company G.

Regimental Statistics:- Original strength, 867. Gain: by recruits in 1865, 38; substitutes, 8; total, 913. Loss: - by death, 70; desertion, 40; transfer, 1; discharge, 39; muster-out, 763

== Casualties ==
The 43rd Wisconsin suffered two enlisted men killed or fatally wounded in action and 2 officers and 72 enlisted men who died of disease, for a total of 76 fatalities. 43d Wisconsin Infantry

== Commanders ==
- Colonel Amasa Cobb

== Notable people ==
- Byron Paine - served as lieutenant colonel. Before and after the war, was justice of the Wisconsin Supreme Court.
- Charles E. Estabrook - served as a corporal in Co. B. After the war, was 14th Attorney General of Wisconsin and member of the Wisconsin State Assembly.

== See also ==
- List of Wisconsin Civil War units
- Wisconsin in the American Civil War
