= Ezra T. Sprague =

American judge (1833–1888)

Wisconsin Circuit Judge for the 10th Circuit
- In office April 13, 1870 – April 1871
- Appointed by: Thaddeus C. Pound
- Preceded by: Ganem W. Washburn
- Succeeded by: Eleazor H. Ellis

Personal details
- Born: June 23, 1833 Windham, Connecticut, U.S.
- Died: December 30, 1888 (aged 55) Salt Lake City, Utah Territory
- Resting place: Mount Olivet Cemetery, Salt Lake City
- Party: Republican
- Spouse: Helen Augusta Crandall (m. 1860–1888)
- Children: Johanna Hutchins Sprague^{(b. 1862; died 1961)}; William Borden Sprague^{(b. 1865; died 1944)}; Mary Theresa Sprague^{(b. 1868; died 1869)}; Bessie Grace (Sharp)^{(b. 1871; died 1960)}; Clarence Brinton Sprague^{(b. 1875; died 1918)}
- Education: Amherst College
- Profession: Lawyer

Military service
- Branch/service: United States Volunteers; Union Army
- Years of service: 1861–1865
- Rank: Colonel, USV; Brevet Brig. General, USV
- Commands: 42nd Reg. Wis. Vol. Infantry
- Battles/wars: American Civil War

Ezra Thompson Sprague (June 23, 1833 – December 30, 1888) was an American lawyer, judge, and Republican politician. He was a Wisconsin circuit court judge in 1870 and 1871. He also served as a Union Army officer in the American Civil War and received an honorary brevet to brigadier general. His name was often abbreviated as E. T. Sprague.

== Early life ==
Ezra Sprague was born in Windham, Connecticut, in June 1833. He was raised and educated there and attended the West Killingly Academy in Danielson, Connecticut. He then attended Amherst College, where he graduated in 1855. After graduation, he returned to West Killingly Academy as a teacher for two terms.

He moved to Madison, Wisconsin, in 1856 and began studying law in the offices of George Baldwin Smith and Elisha W. Keyes. He was admitted to the bar in 1857, and began practicing law in partnership with Jairus H. Carpenter under the firm name Carpenter & Sprague. This partnership continued until Sprague resigned to join the Union Army.

== Civil War service ==
At the outbreak of the American Civil War, Sprague was one of the first to volunteer for service in the Union Army. He was enrolled as a private in Company K of the 1st Wisconsin Infantry Regiment on April 17, 1861, just days after the attack on Fort Sumter. The 1st Wisconsin Infantry Regiment went east to Pennsylvania and Virginia, and Sprague was promoted to corporal and then sergeant. They participated in the Battle of Hoke's Run, but because these early enlistments were only established for three-month terms, the regiment expired in August 1861.

Sprague, like many of the first regiment, re-enlisted for a three-year term. He was then commissioned adjutant of the 8th Wisconsin Infantry Regiment, under colonel Robert C. Murphy. The 8th Wisconsin Infantry mustered into federal service in September 1861, and was assigned to the western theater. Shortly after arriving at St. Louis, they began participating in the campaign to gain control of Missouri under General John Pope. Through 1862, they engaged in all the battles of northern Mississippi around Iuka and Corinth, and then joined Grant's Vicksburg Campaign. In the year after Vicksburg, they participated in a series of campaigns to solidify Union control over the Mississippi River delta, including a campaign into Texas, the Meridian campaign into central Mississippi, and the Red River campaign through Louisiana. During these years, as Sprague was serving as adjutant to the colonel of the 8th Wisconsin Infantry, he also worked as an assistant adjutant on the division staff.

In the Summer of 1864, Sprague returned to Madison, Wisconsin, to accept promotion to colonel and appointment as commander of the 42nd Wisconsin Infantry Regiment. He oversaw the preparation of the regiment at Camp Randall, and mustered into federal service on September 7, 1864. The regiment arrived at Cairo, Illinois, on September 22, and were assigned to guard duty in southern Illinois. Sprague was detached from the regiment and assigned post commander at Cairo for the remainder of the war. The regiment mustered out on June 20, 1865. He was subsequently granted an honorary brevet to brigadier general; he was nominated for the brevet on January 13, 1866, the U.S. Senate confirmed the brevet on March 12, and it had an effective date of June 20, 1865.

== Postbellum years ==
At the close of the war, Sprague moved to De Pere, Wisconsin, and resumed his legal career. In 1870, an act of the legislature changed the Wisconsin circuit courts circuit boundaries, such that the incumbent circuit judge for the 10th circuit no longer resided within the 10th circuit. While the Governor was absent, in April 1870, the Lieutenant Governor Thaddeus C. Pound appointed Sprague to serve as circuit judge for the 10th circuit. Sprague chose not to run for a full term the following year, and was succeeded in April 1871 by Eleazor H. Ellis, who won that election.

That Fall, however, Sprague accepted the Republican nomination for Wisconsin Senate in the 2nd Senate district. The 2nd district, comprising Brown, Kewaunee, and Door counties, was at that time one of the safest Democratic seats in the State Senate. Nevertheless, Sprague ran a good race and came within 200 votes of defeating his Democratic opponent, Myron P. Lindsley.

Sprague suffered from a bout of poor health after the 1871 election, and moved west to Salt Lake City, Utah Territory, hoping that his health would benefit from the mild climate. In Utah he resumed his law practice and served several concurrent roles for the federal government in the territory, including Assistant United States Attorney, bankruptcy commissioner, and clerk of the Utah Territory Supreme Court.

He suffered from poor health in the late 1880s. In December 1888, he contracted a severe cold and died at his home in Salt Lake City on the night of December 30, 1888.

== Personal life and family ==
Ezra Sprague was one of three children born to William Borden Sprague and his second wife, Joanna (née Hutchins). The Spragues were part of the Sprague family from the branch descended from Ralph Sprague, who came to America with the Puritan migration in the 1620s.

Ezra Sprague married Helen A. Crandall of Madison, Wisconsin, on November 20, 1860. They had at least five children together, though one daughter died in childhood.

== Electoral history ==
=== Wisconsin Senate (1871) ===
Wisconsin Senate, 2nd District Election, 1871
Party	Candidate	Votes	%	±%
General Election, November 3, 1871
Democratic	Myron P. Lindsley	2,498	51.68%	−0.15%
Republican	E. T. Sprague	2,336	48.32%	
Plurality		162	3.35%	+0.30%
Total votes		4,834	100.0%	+23.92%
Democratic hold				

Military offices
Regiment established	Command of the 42nd Wisconsin Infantry Regiment; July 29, 1864 – June 20, 1865	Regiment abolished
Legal offices
Preceded by Ganem W. Washburn	Wisconsin Circuit Court Judge for the 10th Circuit; April 13, 1870 – April 1871	Succeeded by Eleazor H. Ellis
