= Lowville, Minnesota =

- Unincorporated community
- Location within Minnesota Location within the United States
- Coordinates: 44°04′00″N 95°52′01″W
- Country: United States
- State: Minnesota
- County: Murray
- Township: Lowville
- Elevation: 1,640 ft (500 m)
- Time zone: UTC-6 (Central (CST))
  - Summer (DST): UTC-5 (CDT)
- Area code: 507
- GNIS feature ID: 654530

Lowville (also Lordville) is an unincorporated community in Lowville Township, Murray County, Minnesota, United States.

== History ==
Bartlett Marshall Low (1839-1893), Minnesota state legislator, farmer, and business, lived in Lowville with his wife and family.
