= George Brown (Wisconsin politician, born 1830) =

American politician

George Brown (June 27, 1830 – March 22, 1909) was a member of the Wisconsin State Assembly.

== Biography ==
Brown was born on June 27, 1830, in South Cerney, England. He settled in Grant County, Wisconsin, in 1855. During the American Civil War, he served with the 42nd Wisconsin Volunteer Infantry Regiment of the Union Army. Brown died on March 22, 1909.

== Assembly career ==
Brown was a member of the Assembly in 1876. He was a Republican.
