= List of United States Supreme Court cases, volume 62 =

Supreme Court of the United States
- Interactive map of Supreme Court of the United States
- 38°53′26″N 77°00′16″W
- Established: March 4, 1789; 236 years ago
- Location: Washington, D.C.
- Coordinates: 38°53′26″N 77°00′16″W
- Composition method: Presidential nomination with Senate confirmation
- Authorised by: Constitution of the United States, Art. III, § 1
- Judge term length: life tenure, subject to impeachment and removal
- Number of positions: 9 (by statute)
- Website: supremecourt.gov

This is a list of cases reported in volume 62 (21 How.) of United States Reports, decided by the Supreme Court of the United States in 1858 and 1859.

== Nominative reports ==
In 1874, the U.S. government created the United States Reports, and retroactively numbered older privately published case reports as part of the new series. As a result, cases appearing in volumes 1–90 of U.S. Reports have dual citation forms; one for the volume number of U.S. Reports, and one for the volume number of the reports named for the relevant reporter of decisions (these are called "nominative reports").

=== Benjamin Chew Howard ===
Starting with the 42nd volume of U.S. Reports, the Reporter of Decisions of the Supreme Court of the United States was Benjamin Chew Howard. Howard was Reporter of Decisions from 1843 to 1860, covering volumes 42 through 65 of United States Reports which correspond to volumes 1 through 24 of his Howard's Reports. As such, the dual form of citation to, for example, New York v. Dibble is 62 U.S. (21 How.) 366 (1859).

== Justices of the Supreme Court at the time of 62 U.S. (21 How.) ==
The Supreme Court is established by Article III, Section 1 of the Constitution of the United States, which says: "The judicial Power of the United States, shall be vested in one supreme Court . . .". The size of the Court is not specified; the Constitution leaves it to Congress to set the number of justices. Under the Judiciary Act of 1789 Congress originally fixed the number of justices at six (one chief justice and five associate justices). Since 1789 Congress has varied the size of the Court from six to seven, nine, ten, and back to nine justices (always including one chief justice).

When the cases in 62 U.S. (21 How.) were decided the Court comprised these nine members:

Portrait	Justice	Office	Home State	Succeeded	Date confirmed by the Senate (Vote)	Tenure on Supreme Court
	Roger B. Taney	Chief Justice	Maryland	John Marshall	March 15, 1836 (29–15)	March 28, 1836 – October 12, 1864 (Died)
	John McLean	Associate Justice	Ohio	Robert Trimble	March 7, 1829 (Acclamation)	January 11, 1830 – April 4, 1861 (Died)
	James Moore Wayne	Associate Justice	Georgia	William Johnson	January 9, 1835 (Acclamation)	January 14, 1835 – July 5, 1867 (Died)
	John Catron	Associate Justice	Tennessee	newly created seat	March 8, 1837 (28–15)	May 1, 1837 – May 30, 1865 (Died)
	Peter Vivian Daniel	Associate Justice	Virginia	Philip P. Barbour	March 2, 1841 (25–5)	January 10, 1842 – May 31, 1860 (Died)
	Samuel Nelson	Associate Justice	New York	Smith Thompson	February 14, 1845 (Acclamation)	February 27, 1845 – November 28, 1872 (Retired)
	Robert Cooper Grier	Associate Justice	Pennsylvania	Henry Baldwin	August 4, 1846 (Acclamation)	August 10, 1846 – January 31, 1870 (Retired)
	John Archibald Campbell	Associate Justice	Alabama	John McKinley	March 22, 1853 (Acclamation)	April 11, 1853 – April 30, 1861 (Resigned)
	Nathan Clifford	Associate Justice	Maine	Benjamin Robbins Curtis	January 12, 1858 (26–23)	January 21, 1858 – July 25, 1881 (Died)

== Notable Case in 62 U.S. (21 How.) ==
=== Ableman v. Booth ===
In Ableman v. Booth, 62 U.S. (21 How.) 506 (1859), the Supreme Court determined that state courts cannot issue rulings that contradict the decisions of federal courts, overturning a decision by the Wisconsin Supreme Court. The U.S. Supreme Court held that under the federal Constitution, federal courts hold final power to decide cases arising under the Constitution and federal statutes, and that the states do not have the power to overturn those decisions. Ableman emphasized the dual form of American government and the independence of state and federal courts from each other.

== Citation style ==
Under the Judiciary Act of 1789 the federal court structure at the time comprised District Courts, which had general trial jurisdiction; Circuit Courts, which had mixed trial and appellate (from the US District Courts) jurisdiction; and the United States Supreme Court, which had appellate jurisdiction over the federal District and Circuit courts—and for certain issues over state courts. The Supreme Court also had limited original jurisdiction (i.e., in which cases could be filed directly with the Supreme Court without first having been heard by a lower federal or state court). There were one or more federal District Courts and/or Circuit Courts in each state, territory, or other geographical region.

Bluebook citation style is used for case names, citations, and jurisdictions.

- "C.C.D." = United States Circuit Court for the District of . . .
  - e.g.,"C.C.D.N.J." = United States Circuit Court for the District of New Jersey
- "D." = United States District Court for the District of . . .
  - e.g.,"D. Mass." = United States District Court for the District of Massachusetts
- "E." = Eastern; "M." = Middle; "N." = Northern; "S." = Southern; "W." = Western
  - e.g.,"C.C.S.D.N.Y." = United States Circuit Court for the Southern District of New York
  - e.g.,"M.D. Ala." = United States District Court for the Middle District of Alabama
- "Ct. Cl." = United States Court of Claims
- The abbreviation of a state's name alone indicates the highest appellate court in that state's judiciary at the time.
  - e.g.,"Pa." = Supreme Court of Pennsylvania
  - e.g.,"Me." = Supreme Judicial Court of Maine

== List of cases in 62 U.S. (21 How.) ==
Case Name	Page and year	Opinion of the Court	Concurring opinion(s)	Dissenting opinion(s)	Lower Court	Disposition
The Steamer Louisiana	1 (1858)	Campbell	none	Daniel	C.C.D. Md.	affirmed
The Propeller Niagara	7 (1859)	Clifford	none	none	D. Wis.	affirmed
Union Insurance Company v. Hoge	35 (1859)	Nelson	none	Daniel	C.C.N.D.N.Y.	affirmed
Leggett v. Humphreys	66 (1859)	Daniel	none	none	C.C.S.D. Miss.	affirmed
Richmond v. City of Milwaukee I	80 (1859)	Taney	none	none	D. Wis.	dismissed
Rice v. Minnesota and Northwestern Railroad Company	82 (1858)	Taney	none	none	Sup. Ct. Terr. Minn.	annulment denied
Kelsey v. Forsyth	85 (1858)	Taney	none	none	C.C.N.D. Ill.	affirmed
Winans v. New York and Erie Railroad Company	88 (1859)	Grier	none	Daniel	C.C.N.D.N.Y.	affirmed
Pennsylvania v. Ravenel	103 (1858)	Nelson	none	Daniel	C.C.E.D. Pa.	affirmed
Covington Drawbridge Company v. Shepherd	112 (1858)	Catron	none	Daniel	C.C.D. Ind.	affirmed
Livermore v. Jenckes	126 (1859)	Wayne	none	none	C.C.S.D.N.Y.	affirmed
Barreda v. Silsbee	146 (1859)	Clifford	none	none	C.C.D. Md.	affirmed
United States v. Sutter	170 (1859)	Campbell	none	Clifford	N.D. Cal.	multiple
Cushing v. Owners of Ship John Fraser	184 (1859)	Taney	none	Nelson; Grier; Clifford	C.C.D.S.C.	reversed
Insurance Company of the Valley of Virginia v. Mordecai	195 (1859)	Taney	none	none	C.C.W.D. Va.	dismissed
Philadelphia, Wilmington and Baltimore Railroad Company v. Quigley	202 (1859)	Campbell	Daniel	none	C.C.D. Md.	reversed
Campbell v. Boyreau	223 (1859)	Taney	none	none	C.C.N.D. Cal.	affirmed
French's Lessee v. Spencer	228 (1859)	Catron	none	none	C.C.D. Ind.	affirmed
Smith v. Orton	241 (1859)	Catron	none	none	D. Wis.	reversed
Allen v. Newberry	244 (1859)	Nelson	Daniel	none	D. Wis.	affirmed
Maguire v. Card	248 (1859)	Nelson	none	none	C.C.D. Cal.	reversed
C. Belcher and Company v. Lawrason	251 (1859)	Nelson	none	none	C.C.E.D. La.	affirmed
Pemberton v. Lockett	257 (1859)	Nelson	none	none	C.C.D.C.	reversed
Poorman v. Woodward	266 (1859)	Catron	none	none	C.C.S.D. Ohio	affirmed
Doe ex rel. Dickins v. Mahana	276 (1859)	Catron	none	none	C.C.S.D. Ohio	reversed
Hill v. Smith	283 (1859)	Grier	none	none	C.C.D. Ind.	reversed
Ford v. Williams	287 (1858)	Grier	none	none	C.C.D. Md.	reversed
Lownsdale v. Parrish	290 (1859)	Catron	none	none	Sup. Ct. Terr. Or.	dismissed
Morehouse v. Phelps	294 (1859)	Catron	none	none	Ill.	reversed
Brown v. Huger	305 (1859)	Daniel	none	none	C.C.W.D. Va.	affirmed
Kendall v. Winsor	322 (1859)	Daniel	none	none	C.C.D.R.I.	affirmed
Thomas v. Lawson	331 (1859)	Daniel	none	none	C.C.E.D. Ark.	affirmed
McKinlay v. Morrish	343 (1859)	Wayne	none	none	N.D. Cal.	affirmed
United States v. City Bank of Columbus	356 (1859)	Wayne	none	none	C.C.S.D. Ohio	affirmed
New York ex rel. Cutler v. Dibble	366 (1859)	Grier	none	none	N.Y. Sup. Ct.	affirmed
New York and Liverpool United States Mail Steamship Company v. Rumball	372 (1859)	Clifford	none	none	C.C.S.D.N.Y.	affirmed
Montgomery v. Anderson	386 (1859)	Taney	none	none	C.C.D. Mo.	reversed
Ballance v. Forsyth	389 (1859)	Taney	none	none	C.C.N.D. Ill.	reinstatement denied
Mason v. Gamble	390 (1859)	Taney	none	none	C.C.D. Md.	dismissed
Richmond v. City of Milwaukee II	391 (1859)	Taney	none	none	D. Wis.	reinstatement denied
Porter v. Foley	393 (1859)	Taney	none	none	Ky.	dismissed
Martin v. Imhsen	394 (1859)	Grier	none	none	C.C.E.D. La.	affirmed
Combs v. Hodge	397 (1859)	Campbell	none	none	C.C.D.C.	remanded
United States v. Nye	408 (1859)	Campbell	none	none	N.D. Cal.	reversed
United States v. Bassett	412 (1859)	Campbell	none	none	N.D. Cal.	reversed
White Water Valley Canal Company v. Vallette	414 (1859)	Campbell	none	none	C.C.D. Ind.	affirmed
Easton v. Salisbury	426 (1859)	McLean	none	none	Mo.	affirmed
McCarty v. Roots	432 (1859)	McLean	none	none	C.C.D. Ind.	affirmed
Pearce v. Madison and Indianapolis Railroad Company	441 (1859)	Campbell	none	none	C.C.D. Ind.	affirmed
United States v. Fossatt	445 (1859)	Campbell	none	none	N.D. Cal.	dismissed
Sturgis v. Clough	451 (1859)	Grier	none	none	C.C.S.D.N.Y.	reversed
Western Telegraph Company v. Magnetic Telegraph Company	456 (1859)	McLean	none	none	C.C.D. Md.	affirmed
Western Telegraph Company v. Penniman	460 (1859)	McLean	none	none	C.C.D. Md.	affirmed
Converse v. United States	463 (1859)	Taney	none	Campbell	C.C.D. Mass.	reversed
Fenn v. Holme	481 (1859)	Daniel	none	none	C.C.D. Md.	reversed
Clearwater v. Meredith	489 (1859)	McLean	none	none	C.C.D. Ind.	reversed
Lea v. Polk County Copper Company	493 (1859)	Catron	none	Daniel	C.C.E.D. Tenn.	affirmed
Ableman v. Booth	506 (1859)	Taney	none	none	Wis.	reversed
Rogers v. Law	526 (1859)	McLean	none	none	C.C.D.C.	dismissed
Brittan v. Barnaby	527 (1859)	Wayne	none	Daniel	C.C.D. Cal.	reversed
Knox County v. Aspinwall	539 (1859)	Nelson	none	Daniel	C.C.D. Ind.	affirmed
Knox County v. Wallace	546 (1859)	Nelson	none	none	C.C.D. Ind.	affirmed
Chamberlain v. Ward	548 (1859)	Clifford	none	Daniel	C.C.S.D. Ohio	affirmed
Ward v. Chamberlain	572 (1859)	Clifford	none	none	C.C.S.D. Ohio	affirmed
White v. Vermont and Massachusetts Railroad Company	575 (1859)	Nelson	none	none	C.C.D. Mass.	reversed
Walker v. Smith	579 (1859)	Grier	none	none	C.C.D.C.	affirmed
Barber v. Barber	582 (1859)	Wayne	none	Daniel	D. Wis.	affirmed
Federal courts do not have jurisdiction to hear divorce or alimony cases, but they have jurisdiction to enforce an alimony decree entered in state court.

== See also ==
certificate of division
