= 1868 Wisconsin Supreme Court special elections =

The 1868 Wisconsin Supreme Court special elections were two special election held on Tuesday, April 7, 1868, to elect two justice to the Wisconsin Supreme Court to complete unexpired partial terms. One race was for the chief justice seat, while another was for an associate justice seat.

== Chief justice ==
1868 Wisconsin Supreme Court Chief Justice special election
- April 7, 1868
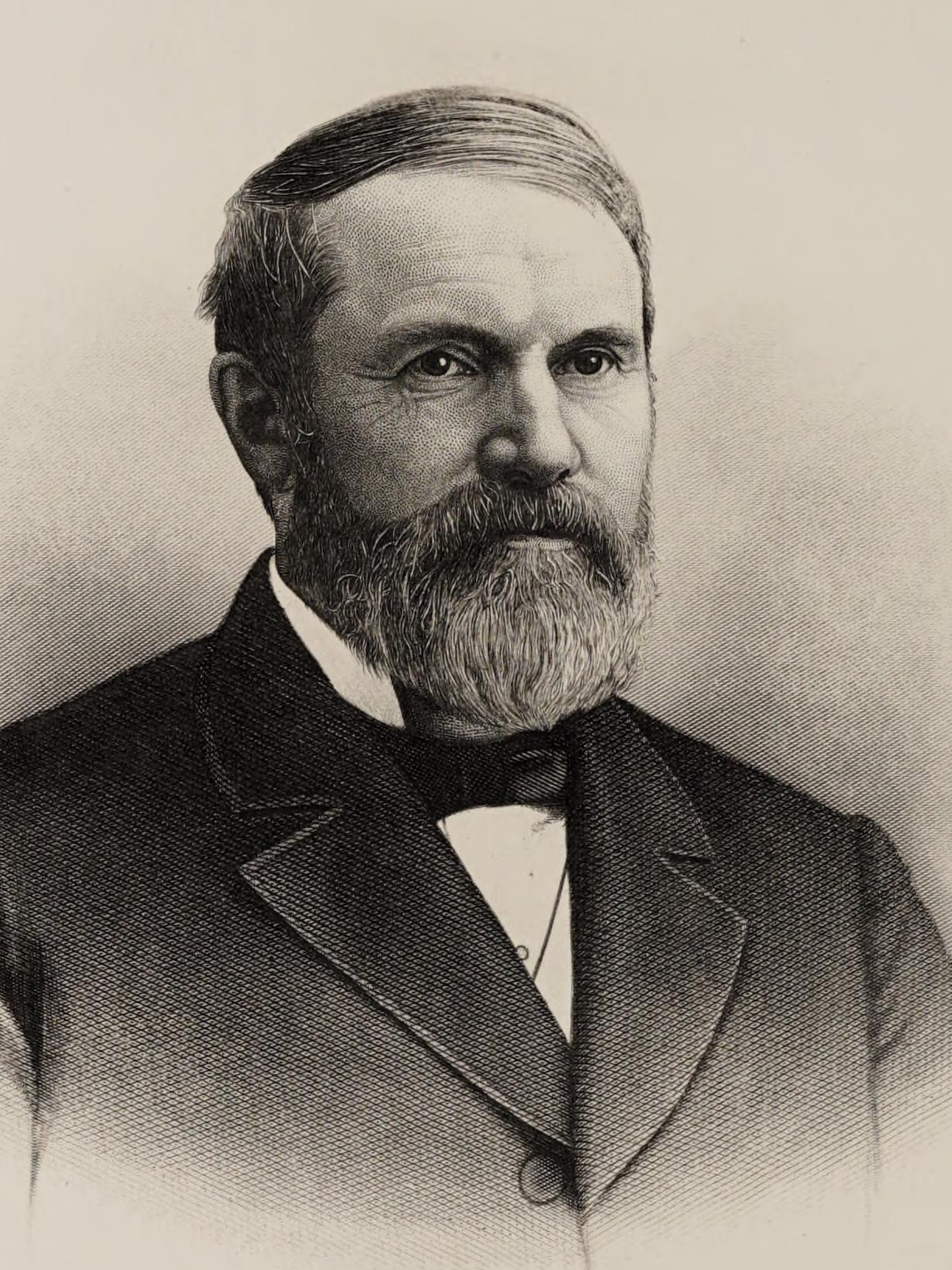

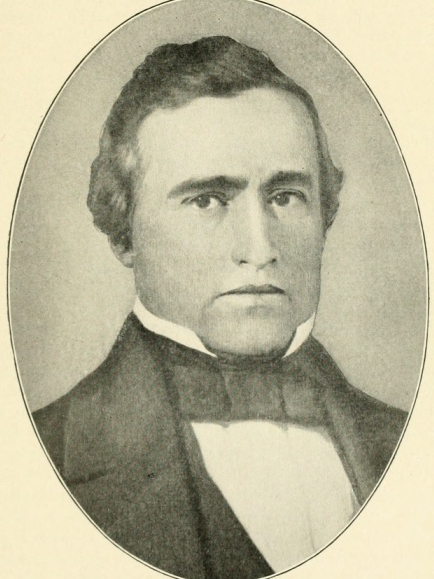
Candidate	Luther S. Dixon	Charles Dunn
Party	Republican	Democratic
Popular vote	72,470	65,683
Percentage	52.40%	47.49%
- Dixon: 50–60% 60–70% 70–80% >90% Dunn: 50–60% 60–70% 80–90% >90% No Data/Unknown: No data
Justice before election
Luther S. Dixon
Republican
Elected Justice
Luther S. Dixon
Republican

Due to unusual circumstances in which the Luther S. Dixon (the incumbent justice) resigned and was immediately re-appointed, a special election was held for the chief justice seat. Dixon won re-election.

=== Background ===
In 1867, the legislature voted to increase the salary for justices to $3,500. The salary for a Wisconsin Supreme Court justice had previous quite small in that era, at just $2,500. However, the Constitution of Wisconsin prohibited Dixon, as the incumbent chief justice, from receiving this new salary until he started a new term. As a work-around to expedite receiving this pay increase, he resigned in March 1867 and was immediately re-appointed by the governor. However, this work around triggered an early special election, as the re-appointment meant he was required to stand for election again before the next regularly scheduled election in 1869.

=== Campaign ===
Dixon received unified support of the Republican. The Democrats nominated Charles Dunn, who had served as chief justice of the supreme court of the Wisconsin Territory government. Dixon prevailed in the election with 52% of the vote.

=== Result ===
1868 Wisconsin Supreme Court Chief Justice special election
Party	Candidate	Votes	%	±%
General Election, April 7, 1868
Republican	Luther S. Dixon (incumbent)	72,470	52.40	
Democratic	Charles Dunn	65,683	47.49	
	Scattering	145	0.10	
Plurality		6,787	4.91	
Total votes		138,298	100	
Republican hold				

== Associate justice ==
1868 Wisconsin Supreme Court special election (associate justice)
- April 7, 1868
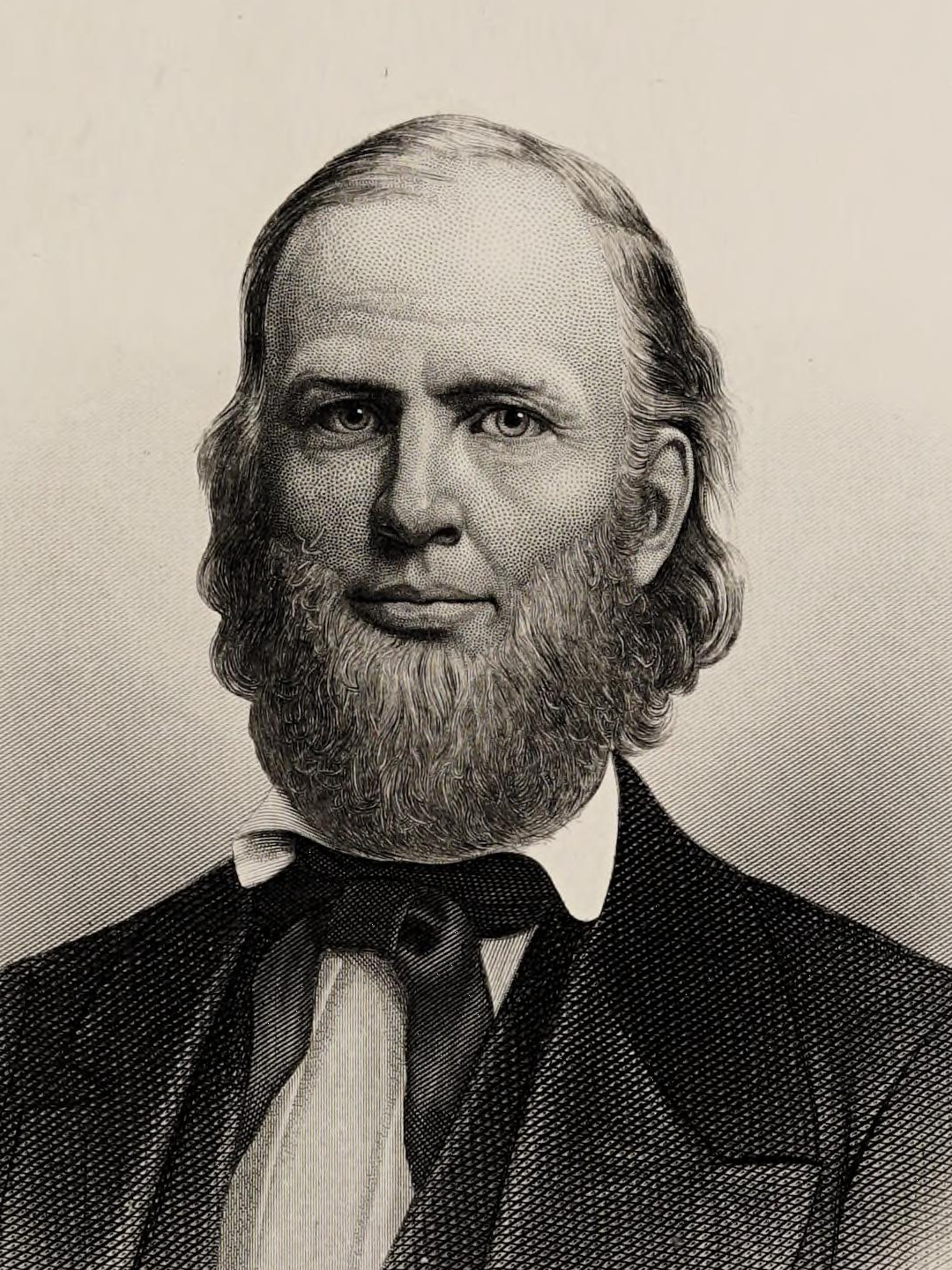

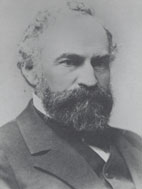
Candidate	Byron Paine	Eleazor H. Ellis
Party	Republican	Democratic
Popular vote	71,908	66,143
Percentage	52.09%	47.91%
Justice before election
Byron Paine
Republican
Elected Justice
Byron Paine
Republican

There was a special election held to elect a justice to the Wisconsin Supreme Court to complete an unexpired partial term vacated by the resignation of Jason Downer. Byron Paine (the incumbent interim appointee) was elected.

=== Background ===
In 1867, Jason Downer resigned from the court and former justice Byron Paine (who had previously served as an elected justice in the same seat, from 1859 through 1864) was appointed to fill the seat until an occupant would be elected in a special election.

=== Results ===
1868 Wisconsin Supreme Court election
Party	Candidate	Votes	%
General Election, April 7, 1868
Republican	Byron Paine (incumbent)	71,908	52.09
Democratic	Eleazor H. Ellis	66,143	47.91
Plurality		5,765	4.18
Total votes		138,051	100
Republican hold			

== See also ==
- 1868 Wisconsin Supreme Court chief justice election –coinciding race for the chief justice seat
