= 42nd Wisconsin Infantry Regiment =

Union Army infantry regiment

- Flag of Wisconsin
- Active: September 7, 1864 – June 20, 1865
- Country: United States
- Allegiance: Union
- Branch: Infantry
- Size: Regiment
- Engagements: American Civil War

Commanders
- Colonel: Ezra T. Sprague
- Lt. Col.: W. Wallace Botkin

The 42nd Wisconsin Infantry Regiment was a volunteer infantry regiment that served in the Union Army during the American Civil War.

== Service ==
The 42nd Wisconsin was organized at Milwaukee, Wisconsin, and mustered into Federal service on September 7, 1864.

The regiment was mustered out on June 20, 1865.

== Casualties ==
The 42nd Wisconsin suffered 58 enlisted men who died of disease, for a total of 58 fatalities.

== Commanders ==
- Colonel Ezra T. Sprague (July 29, 1864 – June 20, 1865) was detached as post commander at Cairo, Illinois, for most of the regiment's service, and was later given an honorary brevet to brigadier general. Earlier, he had been enlisted in the 1st Wisconsin Infantry Regiment and was adjutant for three years with the 8th Wisconsin Infantry Regiment. After the war he served briefly as a Wisconsin circuit court judge.
  - Lt. Colonel W. Wallace Botkin (September 24, 1864 – June 20, 1865) commanded the regiment in the field while Sprague was assigned post commander at Cairo. Previously, he was captain of Co. G in the 12th Wisconsin Infantry Regiment.

== Notable people ==
- George Brown was enlisted in Co. D and rose to the rank of corporal. After the war he was a Wisconsin state legislator.
- William F. Conger was enlisted in Co. G and rose to the rank of sergeant. Previously he had been enlisted in the 7th New York Infantry Regiment. After the war he became a Wisconsin state senator.
- Joseph S. Curtis was 2nd lieutenant in Co. E. Earlier in the war he was enlisted in Co. H, 12th Wisconsin Infantry Regiment. After the war he was a Wisconsin state legislator.
- Darwin Hall was enlisted in Co. H and rose to the rank of corporal. After the war he was a U.S. congressman from Minnesota.
- George M. Humphrey was captain of Co. C, but was largely detached from the regiment to serve as an acting assistant inspector general and ordnance officer. He was previously enlisted in Co. H, 2nd Wisconsin Infantry Regiment, was wounded at First Bull Run, and was later commissioned as an officer during that service. After the war he was a Nebraska state legislator.
- Bartlett Marshall Low was 1st lieutenant in Co. E. After the war he was a Minnesota state legislator.
- Duncan McGregor was captain of Co. A. After the war he was a Wisconsin state legislator.
- Marshall C. Nichols was captain of Co. I. After the war he was a Wisconsin state legislator. He married a niece of Allen Rusk (Cpl, Co. I, below).
- Allen Rusk was enlisted in Co. I and rose to the rank of corporal. After the war he was a Wisconsin state legislator. He was also the brother of Jeremiah McLain Rusk.

== See also ==
- List of Wisconsin Civil War units
- Wisconsin in the American Civil War
