= Sherman Booth =

American politician (1812–1904)

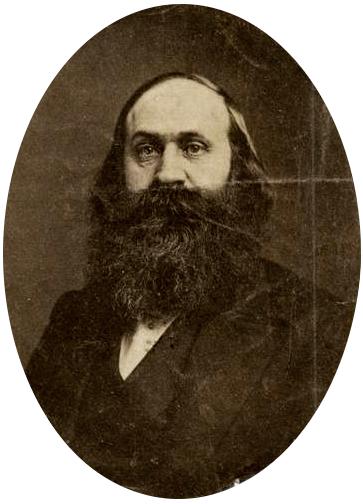
- Born: September 25, 1812; Davenport, New York, U.S.
- Died: August 10, 1904 (aged 91); Chicago, Illinois, U.S.
- Resting place: Forest Home Cemetery, Milwaukee
- Occupation: Newspaper editor
- Known for: liberation of Joshua Glover; Ableman v. Booth; founding of the Republican Party
- Political party: Republican; Free Soil (1848–1854); Liberty (1840–1848)
- Spouses: Margaret Tufts (m. 1842; died 1849); Mary Humphrey Corss (m. 1849; died 1865)
- Children: 5

Sherman Miller Booth (September 25, 1812 – August 10, 1904) was an American abolitionist activist, newspaper editor, and politician in Wisconsin. He was instrumental in forming the Liberty Party in 1840, the Free Soil Party in 1848, and finally the Republican Party in 1854. He became known nationally after instigating and leading a mob to break into the Milwaukee County jail to liberate Joshua Glover, who had been imprisoned under the Fugitive Slave Act of 1850. He was then arrested for his part in the affair and became the focal point of six years of legal struggle between the Wisconsin Supreme Court and the United States Supreme Court in the cases of Ableman v. Booth, culminating in his pardon by President James Buchanan in 1861.

== Early life and education ==
Born in Davenport, New York, he was raised in an area of western New York known for various religious and reform movements. His father was against slavery. He attended and later taught at nearby Jefferson Academy for several years, alternating between teaching and farming. By 1837 he was a traveling speaker and organizer for the New York Temperance Society. He earned a reputation as a persuasive and booming orator. In 1838 he began attending Yale University and proved an exceptional student. He repeatedly declined financial aid, choosing instead to support himself with his continued teaching.

In 1839 he was hired with other Yale students to teach English to the imprisoned Africans who had taken over the slave ship Amistad. He continued to teach the Africans after they were successfully freed by the U.S. Supreme Court. His involvement in the case led him to join the wider abolition movement.

== Party organizer and editor ==
While still in college, in 1840 Booth helped organize the Liberty Party, an abolitionist party born from the evangelical American and Foreign Anti-Slavery Society. He sought to expand the abolition fight from the churches to the statehouses, and became the party's main organizer for Connecticut. After he graduated Phi Beta Kappa from Yale in 1841, he moved to Meriden, Connecticut and joined the staff of the abolitionist paper the Christian Freeman, becoming its associate editor.

Just days before Wisconsin became a state in 1848, Booth and his editor Ichabod Codding arrived in Wisconsin to establish another abolitionist paper, the American Freeman. Booth quickly became its sole proprietor, moving it from Waukesha to Milwaukee and renaming it the Wisconsin Freeman. As chief secretary to the Liberty Party's convention that year in Buffalo, New York, he helped shape the new Free Soil Party and expand its platform beyond abolition to build a larger coalition. In this spirit he renamed his paper the Wisconsin Free Democrat. In 1850 Booth denounced the passage of the Fugitive Slave Act, and with other Wisconsin Free Soilers pressured the state legislature to provide a writ of habeas corpus and trial for accused fugitive slaves. In 1851 he persuaded Whig Leonard J. Farwell to run for governor, resulting in his election and the interruption of control of the state by the Democratic Party.

The year 1854 began with the emergence in Congress of the Kansas-Nebraska bill, which would allow popular sovereignty to decide the issue of slavery in the territories. Echoing other Wisconsin newspapers Booth denounced the bill, and on January 30 he suggested a statewide convention at the capitol in Madison to oppose the Kansas-Nebraska bill. At a Milwaukee meeting on February 13 Booth headed a committee that passed resolutions that were then adapted and adopted by many other anti-Nebraska meetings held throughout the state, including the March 20 meeting in Ripon that resulted in the birth of the Republican Party.

== The Glover liberation ==
On the night of March 10, 1854, Joshua Glover, an escaped slave from Missouri, was seized in his shack in Racine, Wisconsin, by five men headed by his former master Bennami Garland and a federal marshal. Without any explanation Glover was forced into the back of a wagon and taken to jail in Milwaukee. Word of the capture quickly spread and the next morning Booth was informed by telegram. Booth learned the warrant was issued by a federal judge, and went to the jail to apprise the situation. He then rallied on horseback "all freemen who are opposed to being made slaves or slave catchers" to meet in courthouse square at 2 p.m. in protest. Before a crowd nearing 5,000, with some coming from Racine, Booth made clear the dangers of breaking the law, but nevertheless encouraged the mob to show its outrage. After the mob had gathered at the jail, over a hundred Racine men and their sheriff attempted to arrest the federal marshal for assault and battery. The federal judge refused the demands of the mob. After repeated refusals, the restless mob broke through the jail door, and Glover safely escaped to Waukesha. Later, he made his way to Canada via Lake Michigan. Booth did not participate in the rescue himself, but three days later decreed in his paper that the Fugitive Slave Law had been effectively repealed in Wisconsin.

== Legal battling and party organizing ==
Two days later Booth was arrested for aiding and abetting the release of a fugitive slave in violation of the Fugitive Slave Act. Rather than deny his role in inciting the mob action, Booth charged that the law was unconstitutional, and rather than see the rights of a trial by jury nullified he said he would "prefer to see every federal officer in Wisconsin hanged on a gallows." After such inflammatory rhetoric U.S. Commissioner Winfield Smith set Booth's bail at $2000, which his supporters paid immediately, freeing Booth to not only continue his battle against the slave law, but to again editorialize in favor of a statewide anti-slavery convention. Other state newspapers concurred, and on June 9 Booth called for a mass meeting on July 13 at the Wisconsin State Capitol in Madison.

Booth had surrendered himself back into federal custody so his lawyer Byron Paine could appeal for a writ of habeas corpus from the Wisconsin Supreme Court. The court, under Associate Justice Abram D. Smith, freed Booth, declaring that the 1850 Fugitive Slave Law was not only unconstitutional, but "a wicked and cruel enactment." The federal courts responded by calling a grand jury in Madison that resulted in a warrant for Booth's arrest. Nevertheless, Booth worked behind the scenes in organizing the anti-slavery convention, naming officers and determining the platform of what would become Wisconsin's Republican Party. He also made several public speeches despite the risk of arrest. The new party was extraordinarily successful on state ballots that November, netting not only a congressman, but also the state legislature, which in turn elected the country's first Republican senator, Charles Durkee.

On July 19, 1854, the state supreme court officially reaffirmed Smith's decision to free Booth, but two days later he was arrested again by federal officers. Booth tried to appeal to the state court once again, but they refused the case now that it was in a U.S. district court. In January 1855 the jury, instructed to ignore the morality of the Fugitive Slave Law, pronounced Booth guilty and he was ordered to go back to prison. However, he would go on to appeal again and again to the Wisconsin Supreme Court. On February 3, 1855, the court ruled again that the Fugitive Slave Law was unconstitutional, resulting again in Booth's release. Three months later the U.S. Supreme Court agreed to hear the case, but the state court's refusal to transmit its decision to Washington delayed the case for four years. In July 1855 Glover's former owner launched a civil suit in federal court against Booth for the loss of his slave, and Booth was fined $1000 (~$34,554 in 2025).

== Charged with rape ==
In April 1860 Booth was indicted on a morals charge. Fourteen-year-old babysitter Caroline Cook claimed that during an overnight stay caring for his children that Booth had "seduced" her, getting into her bed naked and fondling her, and later carrying her to his own bed and raping her. During the subsequent trial Booth did not testify but his lawyers described Cook as a "little gipsy" and "strumpet." Cook's father testified that Booth had admitted he had done a "great injury" to him and that he wished to settle out of court, but was refused. Ultimately, the jury could not come to an agreement, and seven voted for conviction and five for acquittal. As a result, Booth's second wife, poet Mary H. C. Booth, left him (his first wife Margaret Tufts had died in 1849). His reputation as a moral authority was diminished.

== Ableman v. Booth and imprisonment ==
A month before Booth's indictment in the morals case the U.S. Supreme Court unanimously overturned the state action in Ableman v. Booth, ruling that Wisconsin could not trump federal law. Booth was forced to sell the Wisconsin Free Democrat so he could pay his mounting legals bills. He was rearrested on March 1, 1860, and imprisoned in the federal custom house in Milwaukee, where state officials would not be able to release him.

Despite his imprisonment, Booth kept up his fight against the slave act through editorials sent to his former paper. He still retained a core of supporters, and planned to give a speech to them from his second story cell window on July 4, 1860, but was prevented by officials. Eight attempts were made to free Booth from jail before the ninth try was successful, and on August 1 ten sympathizers succeeded in transporting him to Waupun, Wisconsin. There he was sheltered by abolitionist and later Civil War hero Hans Christian Heg who, ironically, was the warden of the state penitentiary.

Booth did not hide for long, and three days later was making a public speech in Ripon, WI where a friendly crowd prevented his rearrest by a deputy marshal. Other attempts to jail him were thwarted before his capture on October 8, when he was brought back to prison before cheering crowds. Booth was jailed principally for not paying his fines in the previous case, but the extra security needed to prevent another jailbreak proved expensive. As one of his last actions as U.S. president, James Buchanan freed Booth not by pardoning him but by remitting his fines, on request of U.S. district court judge Andrew G. Miller.

During the Civil War Booth founded the pro-Union newspaper The Daily Life, and delivered lectures in support of the cause. In 1865 his paper merged with The Evening Wisconsin, where he was associate editor until 1866. Two years later he moved to manage the Chicago office of the Wisconsin Cooperative Newspaper Association.

== Enfranchising Wisconsin freedmen ==
In November 1865 Booth continued to champion the rights of African Americans by accompanying freedman Ezekiel Gillespie in two attempts to register and vote. After he was refused, Booth and Gillespie's lawyer Byron Paine then appealed the decision, seeking to test a provision in an 1849 referendum that could be construed as allowing nonwhites to vote. Four months later the state supreme court ruled unanimously in Gillespie's favor, enfranchising Wisconsin's black men.

== Later life ==
In 1867 Booth married for the third time, to Augusta Smith. They moved to Chicago, where they raised five children while he worked for various newspapers. In 1876 he moved his family to Philadelphia where he represented the Newspaper Union at the Centennial Exposition. In 1879 the family returned to Chicago, and Booth resumed his journalism, writing primarily for the Chicago Tribune. He died on August 10, 1904, and was buried at Forest Home Cemetery in Milwaukee.
