= Bartlett Marshall Low =

American politician (1839–1893)

Bartlett Marshall Low (February 3, 1839 – July 28, 1893) was an American farmer and politician.

Low was born in Poughkeepsie, New York. He served in the 42nd Wisconsin Infantry Regiment during the American Civil War and was commissioned a first lieutenant. Low moved to Minnesota in 1865 and settled in Lowville, Murray County, Minnesota with his wife and family. He was a farmer and was in the jewellery and watch businesses. Low served on the Murray County Commission. He then served in the Minnesota House of Representatives from 1887 to 1890.
