= Joshua Glover =

Runaway slave from St. Louis, Missouri

- Born: c. 1811
- Died: June 2, 1888; Etobicoke, Ontario
- Known for: Fleeing slavery

Joshua Glover was a fugitive slave who escaped from the United States to Canada in the 1850s. His escape from recapture was part of the chain of events that led to the Civil War and the end of slavery in the U.S.

Originally from the state of Missouri, Glover escaped slavery in 1852 and sought asylum in Racine, Wisconsin. Two years later, upon learning his whereabouts, slave owner Benammi Stone Garland attempted to use the Fugitive Slave Act to recapture him. Glover was arrested and taken to a Milwaukee jail. Word spread of his capture, leading prominent abolitionists like Sherman Booth to galvanize popular support to free him. On March 18, 1854, Glover was broken out of prison by a crowd of more than 5,000 people, (according to the Sauk County Standard, March 1854) and was secretly taken back to Racine through the Underground Railroad.

From here he traveled by boat to Canada, where he spent the rest of his life. He settled outside the city of Toronto, in present-day Etobicoke.

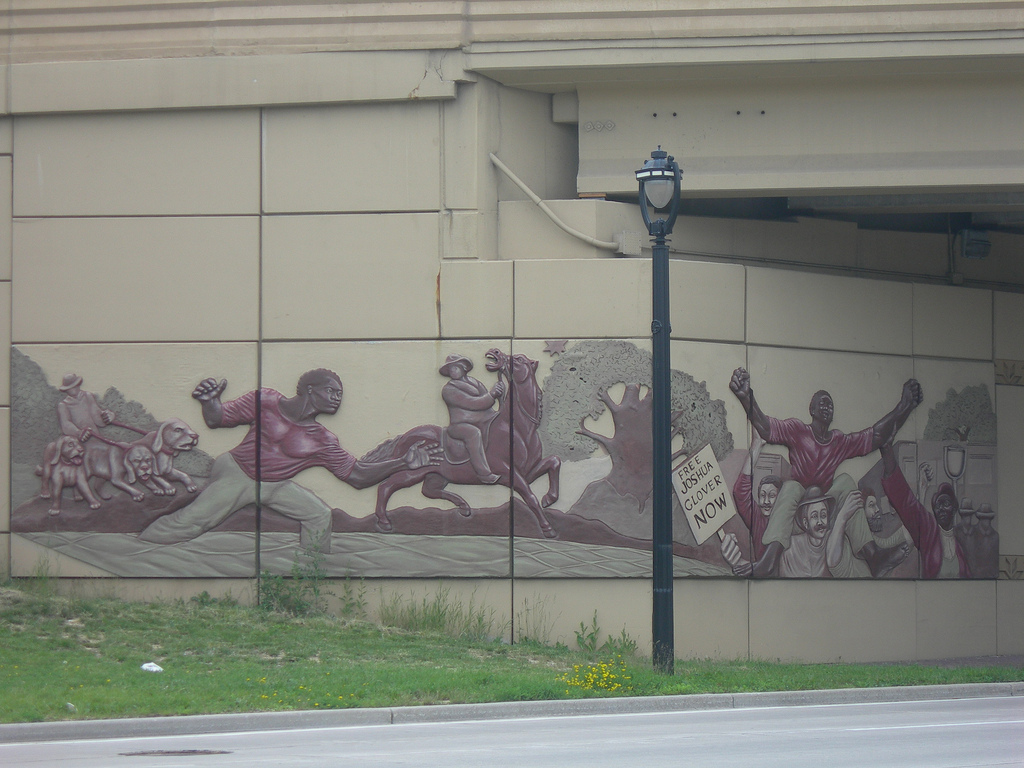
Mural of Glover, on the I-43 overpass in Milwaukee, showing his escape from prison and slavery. The artist is Ras Ammar Nsoroma from Milwaukee Wisconsin who created and painted 3D mural on overpass.

The tale of Glover's dramatic escape spread in newspapers across the north, making him a local folk-hero. Historians today view his story from the perspective of the final decade of slavery in America, amid rising tensions between the north and south in the years leading to the outbreak of the American Civil War in 1861. The rescue of Glover and the federal government's subsequent attempt to prosecute Booth helped to galvanize the abolitionist movement in the state, and the event is seen as an important step in strengthening and legitimizing the northern abolitionist movement as a popular political force. After Glover's escape, the state of Wisconsin would go against the federal government and declare the Fugitive Slave Act unconstitutional, the only state to do so. It was in this context, some nine days after Glover's escape, that the Republican Party was founded, in Ripon, Wisconsin.

== Early life ==
Little is known about Joshua Glover's early life. He was born into slavery in Missouri in the early 19th century and was sold at auction more than once across the state.

Records show that on New Year's Day, 1850, he was sold at St. Louis Courthouse Auction to Benammi Stone Garland, a local estate owner. At the auction, records show that Glover was publicly stripped and examined. The same day, Glover was taken to work on Garland's 300-acre Prairie House Farm estate. He became a foreman, working outside the fields with a group of five other slaves. Reporting directly to Garland, Glover worked outside the fields, caring for farm animals, logging and clearing land. This knowledge of the land likely helped Glover escape in May 1852. As a fugitive slave, he crossed the Mississippi River and headed north to the free states.

By summer, some 300 miles later, he reached Racine, Wisconsin, a city in a free state. Beginning his life as a free man, he found work and housing at Sinclair and Rice Sawmill, a local lumber yard and sawmill owned by Duncan Sinclair, a local businessman. With room and board, there, he took the last name "Glover" and for the next two years took on what would seem a regular life, working as a laborer and skilled carpenter.

== Recapture ==
Having been unable to track him down, Garland put an ad in a local newspaper offering two hundred dollars for Glover's return, who he deemed his property.

Two years after his escape, Glover is said to have been betrayed by his friend Nathan Turner, also a former slave, who gave up his location to Garland. Garland led a group of slave catchers to Wisconsin, where he obtained a federal warrant for Glover's arrest under the Fugitive Slave Act of 1850. This act enabled federal marshals to pursue fugitive slaves anywhere in the United States, arrest them and return them to their slavers.

On March 10, 1854, Garland's group, aided by St. Louis Police, ambushed and arrested Glover. Glover had been taken by surprise. At the time of the arrest, he was in his cabin (rented to him by Sinclair) playing cards with two friends, one of whom was Nathan Turner. Hearing a knock at the door, Glover told his friends not to open the door until he knew who it was. He was suspicious as rumors had spread of slavers being in town and that the day before, marshals had come looking for him. An expedient Turner then unlocked the door, and the party came bursting in. Severely outnumbered, Glover put up a fight, but was ultimately overwhelmed and badly beaten. Glover was hit repeatedly with a club to the face by St. Louis Police Deputy Marshal John Kearney, and the butt of a gun. Bleeding from the head, a half-conscious Glover was thrown in a wagon and taken to Milwaukee jail, where a sympathetic jailer is said to have treated Glover's wounds, possibly saving his life. He was to be held here and brought back to St. Louis the next morning. Garland is said to have given Turner $100, half of the original advertised amount, for his help in the capture.

== Prison break and escape ==
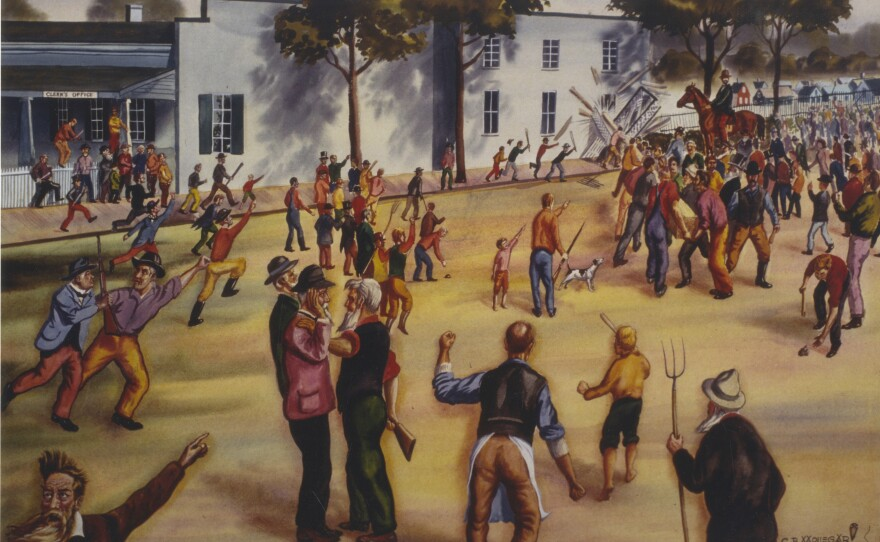
Mural depicting the story of Glover's prison break.

The next day, March 11, word of Glover's arrest and the injuries he had sustained spread in Racine. Charles Clement, editor of the Racine Daily News Advocate, spread handbills about Glover's arrest, and contacted other abolition newspapers which also published accounts of the arrest. Residents gathered in the town square, and local abolitionists mobilized popular support and contacted newspapers. These efforts were facilitated by Sherman Booth, the editor of the Wisconsin Free Democrat newspaper and a prominent abolitionist. To ensure Glover was fairly tried, the abolitionists sent a delegation of over one hundred representatives by boat to Milwaukee. They arrived that same day and joined a crowd that had gathered outside the courthouse demanding a fair and expedited trial. By the evening, the crowd is reported to have grown to about 5000 people (though historians estimate there were around 500).^ With their demands unmet, Booth is said to have spurred the crowd to take matters into their own hands. Using pickaxes from a nearby construction site, and as pieces of lumber as a makeshift battering ram, the crowd broke through the jail walls, freeing Glover. He was escorted to a wagon and helped to escape town quickly. Garland's posse pursued Glover across Wisconsin for weeks.

Still recovering from his injuries, Glover was hidden and supported by the Underground Railroad throughout Racine County. Glover ended up at the warehouse of A. P. Dutton on Racine's harbor. Dutton, a shipping agent and abolitionist, put Glover on a ship to Canada, where he would be free.

== Life in Canada ==
Glover likely left Racine hidden in a ship in early April 1854, heading for Upper Canada. On April 19, 1854, his name reappears on record in Etobicoke, Ontario, in the account book of Thomas Montgomery, a local businessman. It reads, "Joshua Glover the Negro to cash 15/-."; this seems to be a charge of 15 shillings, an advance against his future wages.

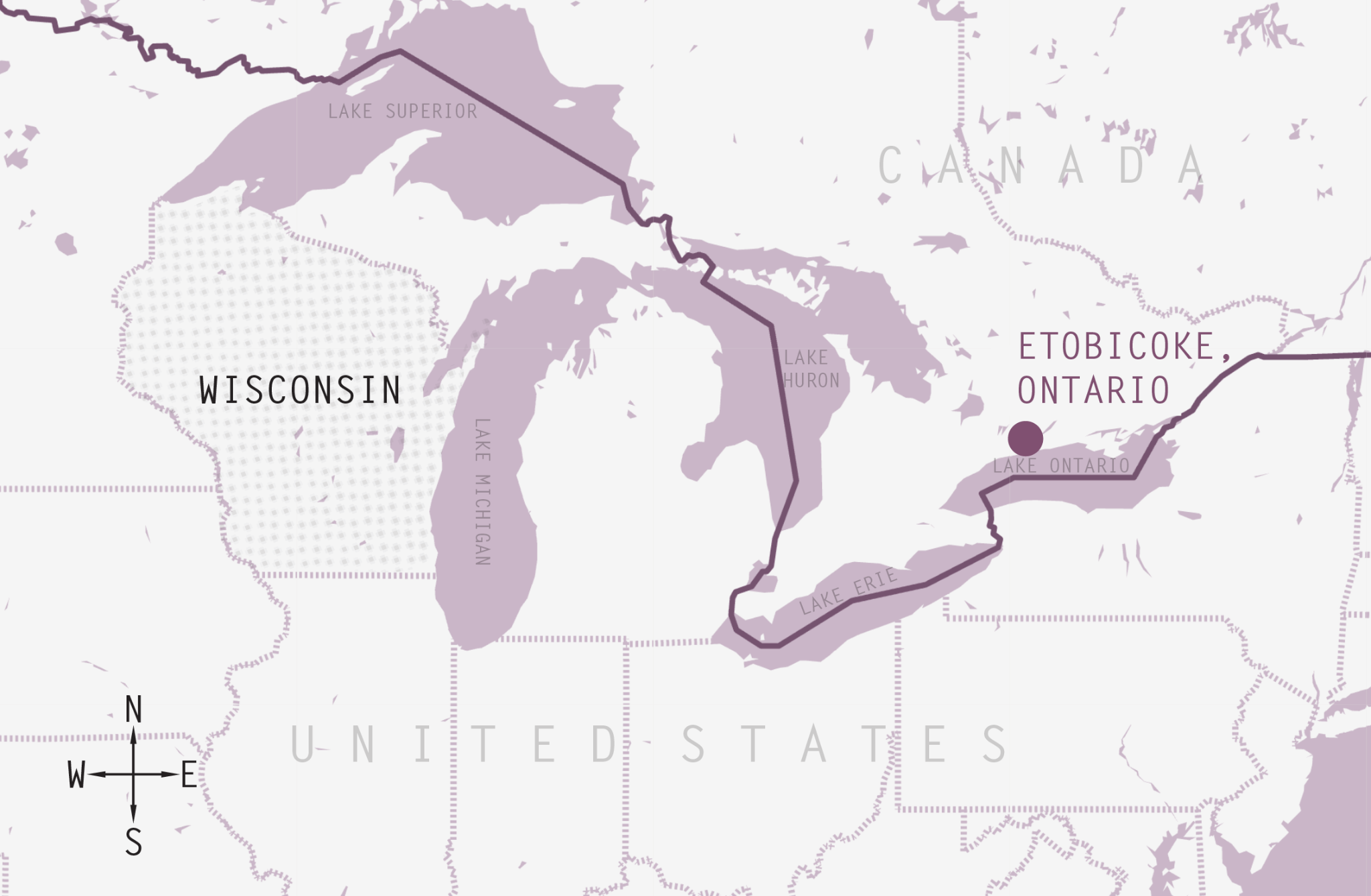
Map of Glover's escape north.

"But just think of it, a man to have to flee from the land of the free, to the realms of Monarchical and Aristocratic Britain, to enjoy even personal freedom."

The Ozaukee Co. Times, printed in the Provincial Freeman.

Little is known of Glover's life in Canada as a free man, but it was likely a difficult one. He continued to work for Montgomery into his early 60s, managing and working his land. Glover rented from Montgomery, living in Lambton Mills, before buying his own property, becoming one of the first black homeowners in the area. He was seen as active member of the community and is recorded as having attended the fall fair of Annual Agricultural Association of Upper Canada in 1858. He married twice, both times to Irish women. He had no known children.

In 1884, now in his 70's, Glover was accused of having stabbed a white man. Members of the community came to his defense, including (then deceased) Montgomery Sr.'s son, William, who provided him with new clothes for court while in prison and access to the family lawyer, who did not charge for the case. His sentence was ultimately reduced to "wounding without intent" and Glover was subsequently sentenced to three months in prison.

In January 1888, Glover was admitted to the York County Industrial Home for the poor and destitute in Newmarket. To pay for his care and lodging there, he was required to work in the shelter's garden fields. He died six months after, and his body was mistakenly donated due to an "administrative error" to the Toronto School of Medicine, a precursor to the University of Toronto. Montgomery's family received a telegram notifying them of Glover's death on 4 June 1888. They attempted to find and recover his body at the medical school, to no avail.

Joshua Glover was buried at St. James Cemetery, in the University of Toronto's medical research memorial, where a memorial plaque can be found.

== Impact ==
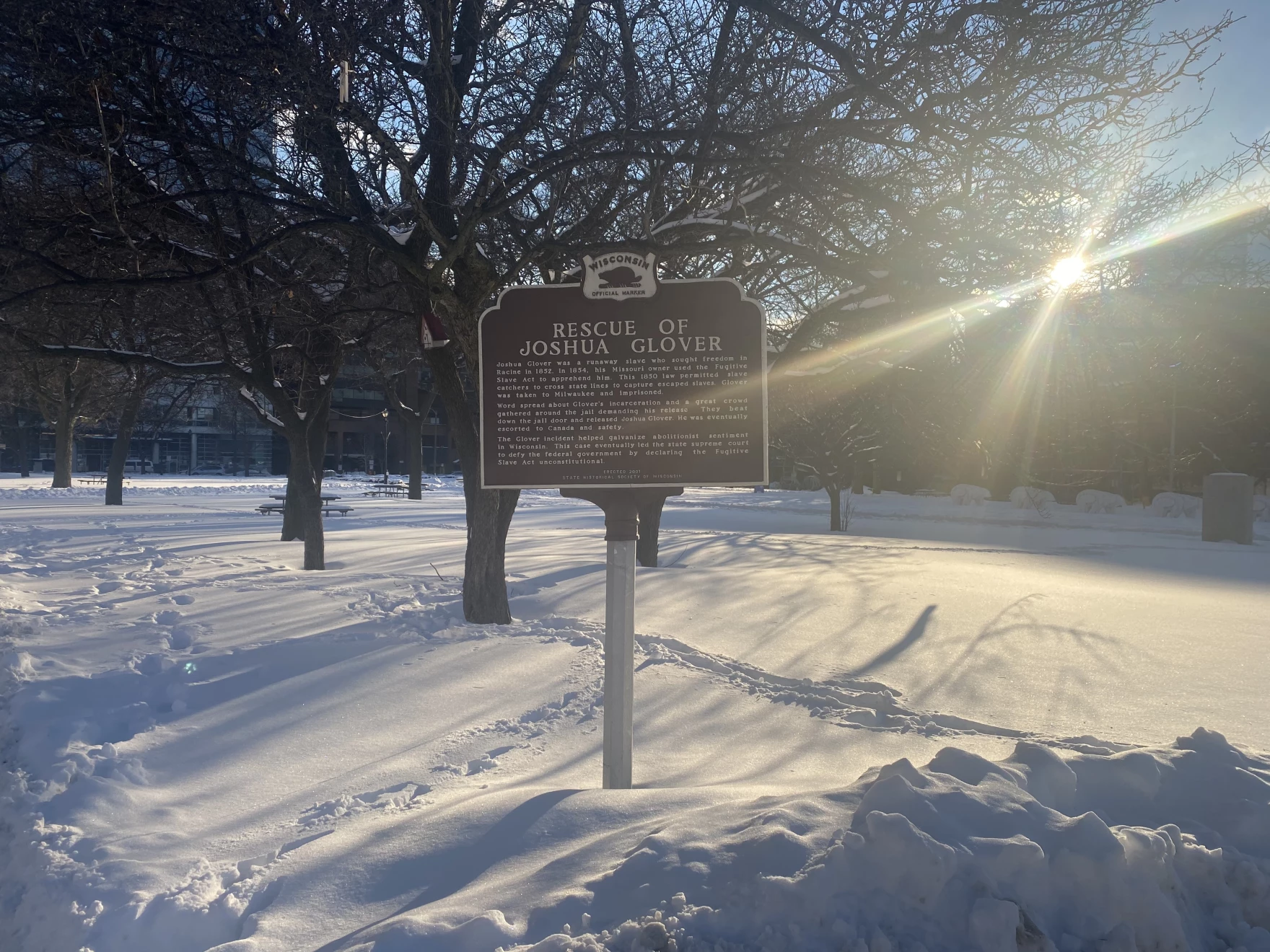
Milwaukee plaque dedicated to Glover's legacy.

Following Glover finding freedom and subsequent attention, the Wisconsin Supreme Court declared the Fugitive Slave Act was illegal, and other states followed suit. Even though the U.S. Supreme Court overruled the state supreme court's ruling, the state legislature passed legislation that declared ex-slaves living in Wisconsin would remain free, an act of open defiance to the Fugitive Slave Act.

This defiance by a northern state of federal laws allowing slavery preempted the Civil War and galvanized the North in fighting the South in order to preserve the Union with slavery abolished.

Glover is well-remembered in Racine and Milwaukee, including through a public mural along Interstate 94 in Milwaukee depicting Glover's escape from slavery and liberation, commemorative plaques in Milwaukee and Racine, exhibits at the Racine Heritage Museum, celebrations of Joshua Glover Day on March 18 organized by America's Black Holocaust Museum, and a halfway house/treatment center named after him operated by Wisconsin Community Services in Milwaukee.

== See also ==
- Jerry Rescue
- Ableman v. Booth

== Notes ==
1. ^ A newspaper account of the escape; historians estimate there were likely around five hundred people in the crowd, given the population of Wisconsin at the time, eye-witness accounts and other indicators.
2. ^ Glover is said to have never returned to Wisconsin. However, though this is unconfirmed in historical records, he is rumored to have returned to the US briefly at the onset of the American Civil War to fight for the Union.
