= Fugitive Slave Act of 1850 =

Act of the United States Congress

- Long title: An Act to amend, and supplementary to, the Act entitled "An Act respecting Fugitives from Justice, and Persons escaping from the Service of their Masters", approved February twelfth, one thousand seven hundred and ninety-three.
- Enacted by: the 31st United States Congress

Citations
- Public law: Pub. L. 31–60
- Statutes at Large: 9 Stat. 462

Legislative history
- Introduced in the Senate as S. 23 by James M. Mason (D–VA) on January 4, 1850; Committee consideration by Senate Judiciary; Passed the Senate on August 23, 1850 (27–12); Passed the House on September 12, 1850 (109–76); Signed into law by President Millard Fillmore on September 18, 1850

Major amendments
- Repealed by Act of June 28, 1864, 13 Stat. 200

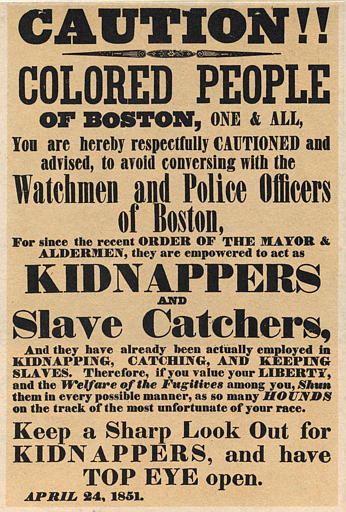
An April 24, 1851 poster warning the "colored people of Boston" about policemen acting as slave catchers

The Fugitive Slave Act or Fugitive Slave Law was a statute passed by the 31st United States Congress on September 18, 1850, as part of the Compromise of 1850 between Southern interests in slavery and Northern Free-Soilers.

The Act was one of the most controversial elements of the 1850 compromise and heightened Northern fears of a slave power conspiracy. It required that all escaped slaves, upon capture, be returned to the slave-owner, and that officials and citizens of free states had to cooperate. The Act contributed to the growing polarization of the country over the issue of slavery. It was one of the factors that led to the founding of the Republican Party and the start of the American Civil War.

== Background ==
By 1843, several hundred enslaved people per year escaped to the North successfully, making slavery an unstable institution in the border states.

The earlier Fugitive Slave Act of 1793 was a federal law that was written with the intent to enforce Article 4, Section 2, Clause 3 of the United States Constitution, which required the return of escaped slaves. It sought to force the authorities in free states to return fugitive slaves to their enslavers.

Many free states wanted to disregard the Fugitive Slave Act. Some jurisdictions passed personal liberty laws, mandating a jury trial before alleged fugitive slaves could be moved, while others forbade the use of local jails or the assistance of state officials in arresting or returning fugitive slaves. In some cases, juries refused to convict individuals who had been indicted under the federal law.

The Missouri Supreme Court routinely held that enslaved people who had been relocated into neighboring free states along with their enslavers gained their freedom as a result. The 1793 act dealt with slaves who escaped to free states without their enslavers' consent. The Supreme Court of the United States ruled in Prigg v. Pennsylvania (1842) that states were not required to aid in the hunting or recapture of slaves, significantly weakening the law of 1793.

After 1840, the Black population of Cass County, Michigan, proliferated as families were attracted by White defiance of discriminatory laws, by numerous highly supportive Quakers, and by low-priced land. Free and escaping Blacks found Cass County a haven. Their good fortune attracted the attention of Southern slavers. In 1847 and 1849, planters from Bourbon and Boone Counties, Kentucky, led raids into Cass County to recapture escaped slaves. The attacks failed, but the situation contributed to Southern demands in 1850 to pass a strengthened fugitive-slave act.

Southern politicians often exaggerated the number of people escaping enslavement, blaming the escapes on Northern abolitionists, whom they believed to be inciting their allegedly happy slaves and interfering with Southern property rights. According to the Columbus Enquirer of 1850, the support from Northerners for fugitive slaves caused more ill will between the North and the South than did all the other causes combined.

== New law ==
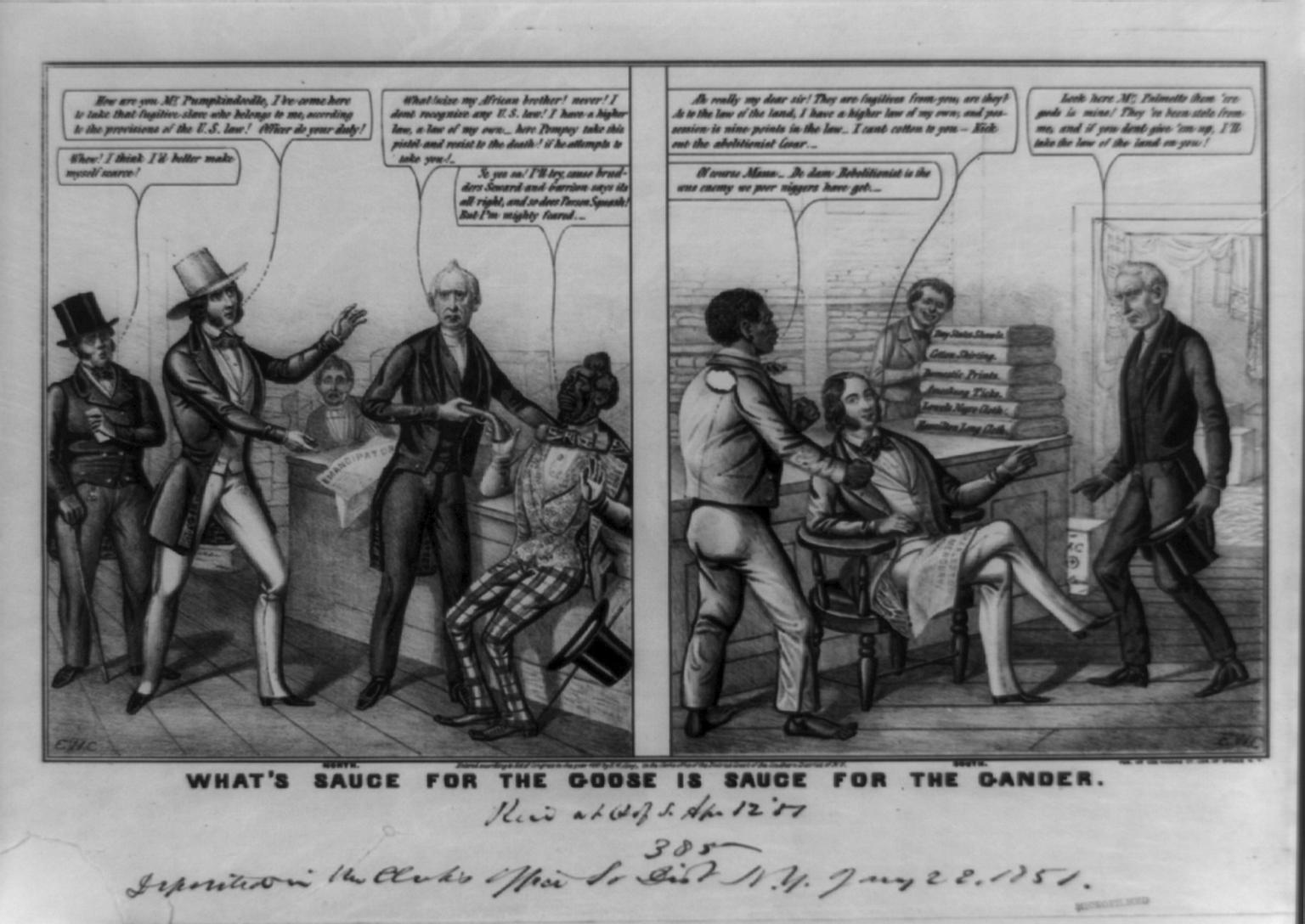
Print by E. W. Clay, an artist who published many proslavery cartoons, supports the Fugitive Slave Act of 1850. In the cartoon, a Southerner mocks a Northerner who claims his goods, several bolts of fabric, have been stolen. "They are fugitives from you, are they?" asks the slaver. Adopting the rhetoric of abolitionists, he continues, "As to the law of the land, I have a higher law of my own, and possession is nine points in the law."

In response to the weakening of the original Fugitive Slave Act, Democratic senator James M. Mason of Virginia drafted the Fugitive Slave Act of 1850, which penalized officials who did not arrest fugitive slaves and made them liable to a fine of $1,000 (equivalent to $38,700 in 2025). Law-enforcement officials everywhere were required to arrest suspected escaped slaves on as little as a claimant's sworn testimony of ownership. Habeas corpus was declared irrelevant. The commissioners before whom the alleged fugitive slaves were brought for a hearing (no jury was permitted, and the alleged slaves could not testify) were compensated $10 (equivalent to $390 in 2025) if the subject was proven to be a fugitive and only $5 (equivalent to $190 in 2025) if he determined the proof to be insufficient. In addition, any person aiding a fugitive by providing food or shelter was subject to as long as six months of imprisonment and a fine as high as $1,000. Officers who captured fugitive slaves were entitled to bonuses or promotions for their work. This led to many officers working very hard to capture fugitive slaves. Many northerners did not like how officers were rewarded for capturing runaway slaves, and this made it much more difficult for them to move former enslaved people to the north. This also led many fugitive slaves, who had already escaped to the north, to move to Canada for protection. Even with the act being enforced, it was still very difficult to ensure it was being followed by everyone. In the North, there were still many officers who refused to comply with the law. This eventually led to more resistance by the north, and many people refused to follow the act at all.

Enslavers needed only to supply an affidavit to a federal marshal to capture a fugitive from slavery. Since a suspected enslaved person was not eligible for a trial, the law resulted in the kidnapping and conscription of free Blacks into slavery, as purported fugitive slaves had no rights in court and could not defend themselves against accusations.

James Oakes writes that "there was no statute of limitations. African Americans who had built families and worked as free people in the North for decades were vulnerable to re-enslavement at any time."

The act adversely affected the prospects of escape from slavery, particularly in states close to the North. One study found that while slave prices rose across the South in the years after 1850, it appears that "the 1850 Fugitive Slave Act increased prices in border states by 15% to 30% more than in states further south", illustrating how the act altered the chance of successful escape.

According to abolitionist John Brown, even in the supposedly safe refuge of Springfield, Massachusetts, "some of them are so alarmed that they tell me that they cannot sleep on account of either them or their wives and children. I can only say I think I have been enabled to do something to revive their broken spirits. I want all my family to imagine themselves in the same dreadful condition."

=== Judicial nullification ===
In 1855, the Wisconsin Supreme Court became the only state high court to declare the Fugitive Slave Act unconstitutional as a result of a case involving fugitive slave Joshua Glover and Sherman Booth, who led efforts that thwarted Glover's recapture. In 1859 in Ableman v. Booth, the Supreme Court of the United States overruled the state court. The Wisconsin Supreme Court decision reflected the ongoing conflict between the North and the South very greatly. This case really demonstrated the growing conflict between Northern states and federal authority in regards to the Fugitive Slave Act of 1850 as well. Throughout this time period it is very clear to see the deep divide between the states and federal authority. Overall, this case represents the beliefs many people in the Northern states had over this conflict.

Jury nullification occurred as Northern juries acquitted men accused of violating the law. Secretary of State Daniel Webster was a key supporter of the law, as expressed in his famous "Seventh of March" speech, who wanted high-profile convictions. The jury nullifications ruined Webster's presidential aspirations and his last-ditch efforts to find a compromise between North and South. Webster led the prosecution against men accused of rescuing Shadrach Minkins in 1851 from Boston officials who intended to return Minkins to slavery; the juries convicted none of the men. Webster sought to enforce a law that was extremely unpopular in the North, and his Whig Party rejected him again when it chose a presidential nominee in 1852.

=== Legislative nullification ===
In November 1850, the Vermont legislature passed the Habeas Corpus Law, requiring Vermont judicial and law enforcement officials to assist captured fugitive slaves. It also established a state judicial process, parallel to the federal process, for people accused of being fugitive slaves. This law rendered the federal Fugitive Slave Act effectively unenforceable in Vermont and caused a storm of controversy nationally. It was considered a nullification of federal law, a concept popular among slave states that wanted to nullify other aspects of federal law, and was part of highly charged debates over slavery. Noted poet and abolitionist John Greenleaf Whittier had called for such laws, and the Whittier controversy heightened pro-slavery reactions to the Vermont law. Virginia governor John B. Floyd warned that nullification could push the South toward secession. At the same time, President Millard Fillmore threatened to use the army to enforce the Fugitive Slave Act in Vermont. No test events took place in Vermont, but the rhetoric of the incident echoed South Carolina's 1832 nullification crisis and Thomas Jefferson's 1798 Kentucky Resolutions.

In February 1855, the Michigan legislature passed a law prohibiting county jails from being used to detain recaptured slaves, directing county prosecutors to defend recaptured slaves and entitling recaptured slaves to habeas corpus and trial by jury. Other states to pass personal liberty laws include Connecticut, Massachusetts, Maine, New Hampshire, Ohio, Pennsylvania and Wisconsin. Personal liberty laws helped protect many alleged fugitive slaves from being unfairly captured and returned to the South. While, these laws could not be used to overturn federal legislation they helped many people from being falsely accused as a fugitive slave. These laws were designed to help limit many states involvement in enforcing the Fugitive Slave Act of 1850. The addition of personal liberty laws also increased the tension between Northern and Southern states in the 1850s. Many Southern states did not agree with personal liberty laws and felt they were unfair and went against the Fugitive Slave Act. These disputes further increased the conflict between the North and the South and eventually helped lead to the Civil War.

=== Resistance in the North and other consequences ===
The Fugitive Slave Law brought the issue home to anti-slavery citizens in the North, as it made them and their institutions responsible for enforcing slavery. "Where before many in the North had little or no opinions or feelings on slavery, this law seemed to demand their direct assent to the practice of human bondage, and it galvanized Northern sentiments against slavery." Moderate abolitionists were faced with the immediate choice of defying what they believed to be an unjust law or breaking with their consciences and beliefs. Harriet Beecher Stowe wrote Uncle Tom's Cabin (1852) in response to the law. This law changed the way many Northerners viewed fugitive slaves. Many Northerners felt that fugitive slaves were not their problem but now they were obligated to report any fugitive slave and help assist in the return of the alleged fugitive slave. Northerners being obligated to follow this federal law shifted the public's opinion on this issue and led many people to openly refuse to help assist in the capture of a fugitive slave.

Many abolitionists openly defied the law. Reverend Luther Lee, pastor of the Wesleyan Methodist Church of Syracuse, New York, wrote in 1855:

I never would obey it. I had assisted thirty slaves to escape to Canada during the last month. If the authorities wanted anything of me, my residence was at 39 Onondaga Street. I would admit that and they could take me and lock me up in the Penitentiary on the hill; but if they did such a foolish thing as that I had friends enough in Onondaga County to level it to the ground before the next morning.

Several years before, in the Jerry Rescue, Syracuse abolitionists freed by force a fugitive slave who was to be sent back to the South and successfully smuggled him to Canada. Thomas Sims and Anthony Burns were both captured fugitives who were part of unsuccessful attempts by opponents of the Fugitive Slave Law to use force to free them. Other famous examples include Shadrach Minkins in 1851 and Lucy Bagby in 1861, whose forcible return has been cited by historians as important and "allegorical". Pittsburgh abolitionists organized groups whose purpose was the seizure and release of any enslaved person passing through the city, as in the case of a free Black servant of the Slaymaker family, erroneously the subject of a rescue by Black waiters in a hotel dining room. If fugitives from slavery were captured and put on trial, abolitionists worked to defend them in trial, and if by chance the recaptured person had their freedom put up for a price, abolitionists worked to pay to free them. Other opponents, such as African-American leader Harriet Tubman, treated the law as just another complication in their activities.

In April 1859, a putative freeman named Daniel Webster was arrested in Harrisburg, Pennsylvania, alleged to be Daniel Dangerfield, an escaped slave from Loudoun County, Virginia. At a hearing in Philadelphia, federal commissioner J. Cooke Longstreth ordered Webster's release, arguing the claimants had not proved that he was Dangerfield. Webster promptly left for Canada.

=== Canada ===
One important consequence was that Canada, not the Northern free states, became the foremost destination for escaped slaves. Canada quickly became a popular destination for fugitive slaves because United States laws could not be enforced there so it gave them full freedom. Many fugitive slaves believed the Northern states we no longer safe to them after the Fugitive Slave Act of 1850 was passed. This led to massive growth in communities in Canada established by formerly enslaved people. The Black population of Canada increased from 40,000 to 60,000 between 1850 and 1860, and many reached freedom by the Underground Railroad. Notable Black publishers, such as Henry Bibb and Mary Ann Shadd, created publications encouraging emigration to Canada. By 1855, an estimated 3,500 people among Canada's Black population were fugitives from American slavery. In Pittsburgh, for example, during the September following the passage of the law, organized groups of escaped slaves, armed and sworn to "die rather than be taken back into slavery", set out for Canada, with more than 200 men leaving by the end of the month. The Black population in New York City dropped by almost 2,000 from 1850 to 1855. The Fugitive Slave Act of 1850 also had massive affects on the Underground Railroad during this time period. With the new act set in place federal law required citizens to report and fugitive slave and assist with their capture to their best ability. Safe houses often called "Stations" became much more organzied during this time period and fugitive slaves had to move much more carefully. This often times discouraged slaves from attempting their escape due to the increased risk aligned after the Fugitive Slave Act of 1850 was passed. Regardless many still escaped, but often set their sights on moving to Canada instead of the Northern United States. This act also created one of the best known conflicts involving a fugitive slave by the name of Anthony Burns. Anthony Burns was an escaped slave who was captured and arrest in Boston in 1854. This ultimately drew the attention of thousands of people and the showed up to protest that Anthony was a free man and should not be returned to slavery. Anthony was eventually sent back to Virginia but this caused lots of national attention across the North and grew the ongoing conflict between the North and the South.

On the other hand, many Northern businessmen supported the law due to their commercial ties with the Southern states. They founded the Union Safety Committee and raised thousands of dollars to promote their cause, which gained sway, particularly in New York City, and caused public opinion to shift somewhat towards supporting the law.

== Incidents involving the Act ==
- Fugitive Slave Convention, August 1850, Cazenovia, New York
- The act passes Congress and is signed by President Fillmore on September 18, 1850
- Seizure and enslavement of James Hamlet, September 26, 1850, Williamsburg, New York
- Escape of Shadrach Minkins, February 1851, Boston
- Reenslavement of Thomas Sims, April 1851, Boston
- Christiana Riot, September 1851, Christiana, Pennsylvania
- Jerry Rescue, October 1851, Syracuse, New York
- Escape of Joshua Glover, March 1854, Milwaukee
- Reenslavement of Anthony Burns, May/June 1854, Boston
- Attempted reenslavement of Jane Johnson, July 1855, Philadelphia
- Oberlin–Wellington Rescue, September 1858, Oberlin and Wellington, Ohio
- Escape of Charles Nalle, November 1860, Troy, New York

== Repeal of the Act ==
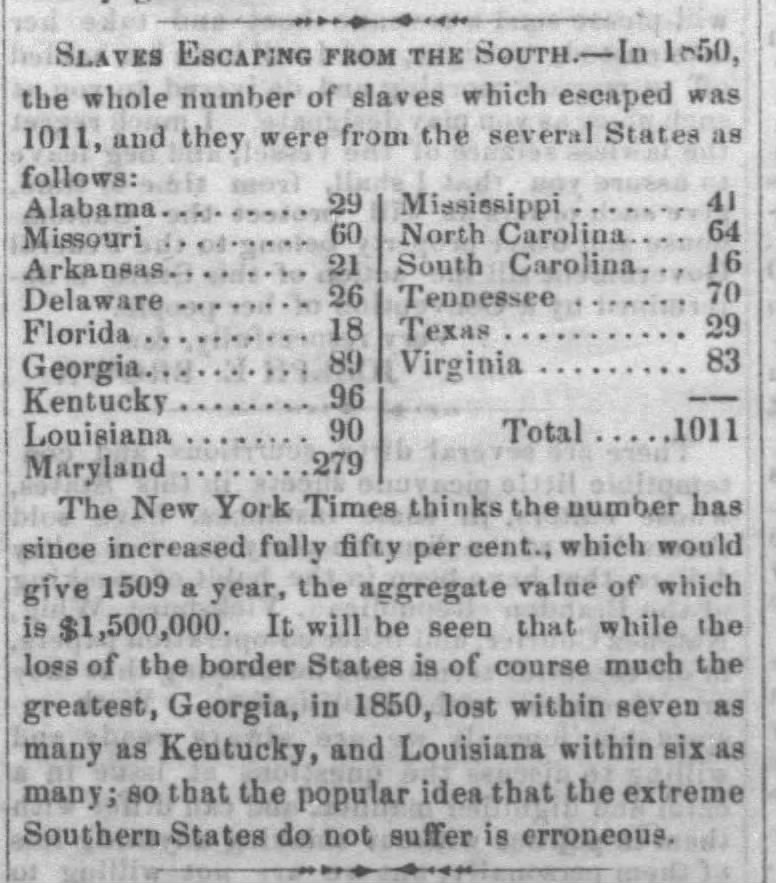
The Vicksburg Whig did not cite any sources for these claims about the number of fugitives from American slavery ("Slaves Escaping from the South", January 16, 1861).

In the early stages of the American Civil War, the Union had no established policy on people escaping from slavery. Many enslaved people left their plantations heading for Union lines. Still, in the early stages of the war, fugitives from slavery were often returned by Union forces to their enslavers. General Benjamin Butler and some other Union generals, however, refused to recapture fugitives under the law because the Union and the Confederacy were at war. He confiscated enslaved people as contraband of war and set them free, with the justification that the loss of labor would also damage the Confederacy. Lincoln allowed Butler to continue his policy but countermanded broader directives issued by other Union commanders that freed all enslaved people in places under their control.

In August 1861, the U.S. Congress enacted the Confiscation Act of 1861, which barred enslavers from re-enslaving captured fugitives who were forced to aid or abet the insurrection. The legislation, sponsored by Lyman Trumbull, was passed on a near-unanimous vote and established military emancipation as official Union policy, but applied only to enslaved people used by rebel enslavers to support the Confederate cause, creating a limited exception to the Fugitive Slave Act. The Union army sometimes returned fugitives from slavery to enslavers until March 1862, when Congress enacted the Confiscation Act of 1862, Section 10 of which barred Union officers from returning slaves to their owners on pain of dismissal from the service. James Mitchell Ashley proposed legislation to repeal the Fugitive Slave Act, but the bill did not make it out of committee in 1863. Although the Union policy of confiscation and military emancipation had effectively superseded the operation of the Fugitive Slave Act, the Fugitive Slave Act was only formally repealed in June 1864. The New York Tribune hailed the repeal, writing: "The blood-red stain that has blotted the statute-book of the Republic is wiped out forever."

== See also ==
- Fugitive slave laws in the United States
- Ableman v. Booth
- Contraband (American Civil War)
- Emancipation Proclamation
- Fugitive Slave Convention of 1850, Cazenovia, New York
- Prigg v. Pennsylvania
- Slave Trade Acts
- Underground Railroad

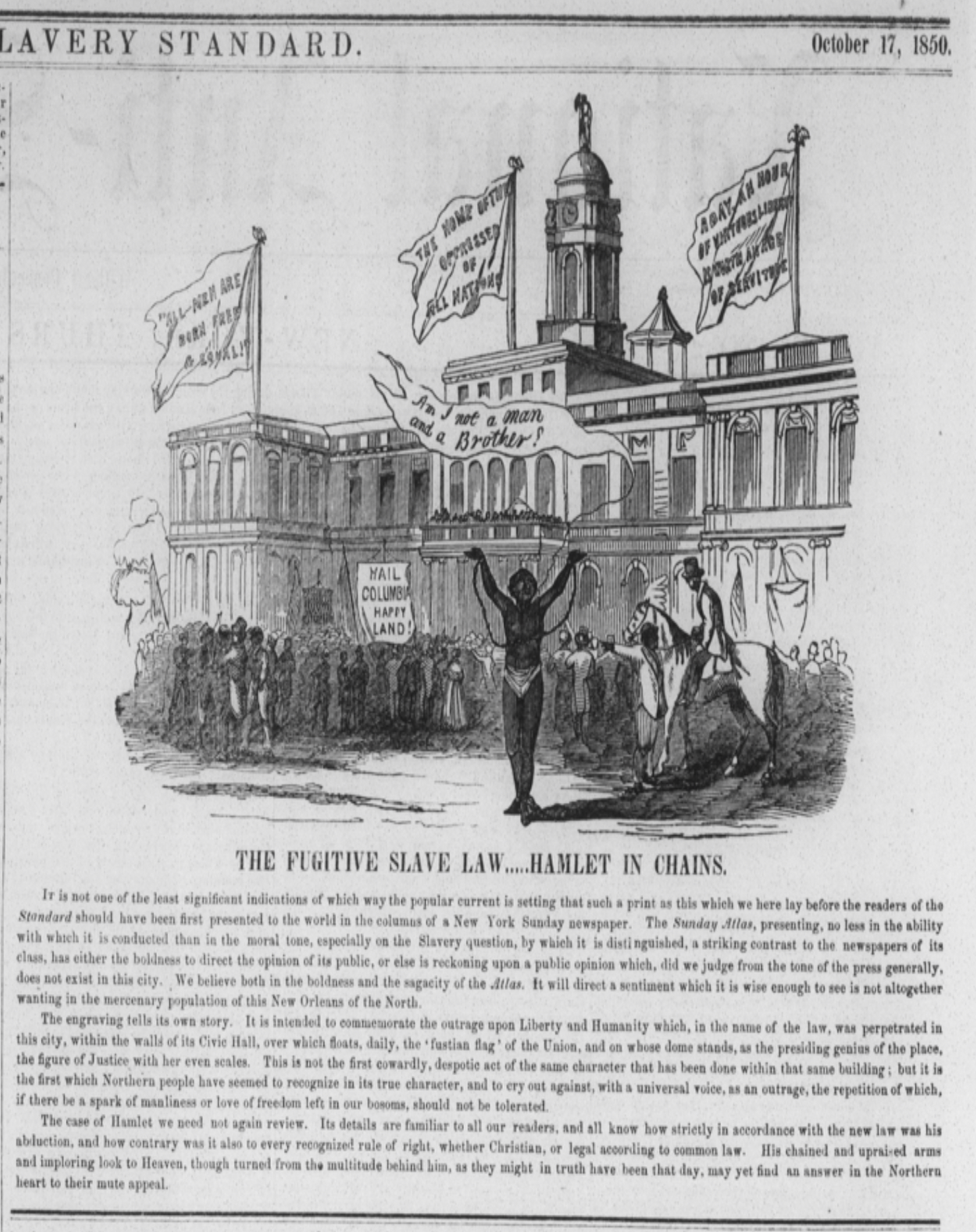
James Hamlet, the first man re-enslaved under the Fugitive Slave Law of 1850, in front of New York City Hall. The banner on the right reads: "A day, an hour, of virtuous liberty is worth an age of servitude".

== Sources ==
- Campbell, Stanley W (1970). The Slave Catchers: Enforcement of the Fugitive Slave Law, 1850–1860. Chapel Hill: University of North Carolina Press. Archived from the original on June 26, 2012 – via Questia.
- Fehrenbacher, Don E. (2002). The Slaveholding Republic: An Account of the United States Government's Relations to Slavery. Oxford University Press/NetLibrary, Incorporated. ISBN 978-0198032472.
- Franklin, John Hope; Schweninger, Loren (1999). Runaway Slaves: Rebels on the Plantation. Oxford University Press. Archived from the original on June 27, 2012 – via Questia.
- "Fugitive Slave Law" (2008)
- Nevins, Allan (1947). Ordeal of the Union: Fruits of Manifest Destiny, 1847–1852. Vol. 1. Collier Books. ISBN 978-0020354413.
- National Constitution Center. 1850. The Fugitive Slave Act (1850) National Constitution Center
  - This source is published by the National Constitution Center, a non profit organization established by congress to increase the public's understanding of the U.S. Constitution and American history. This source helped me specify the facts of the law.
- Jones, Scott. (2026) The Fugitive Slave Act of (1850): A public rights Paradox. Yale Law Journal.
