= Ableman v. Booth =

Ableman v. Booth United States v. Booth
- Supreme Court of the United States

Argued January 19, 1859 Decided March 7, 1859
- Full case name: Stephen V. Ableman, plaintiff in error v. Sherman M. Booth; and the United States, plaintiff in error v. Sherman M. Booth
- Citations: 62 U.S. 506 (more) 21 How. 506; 16 L. Ed. 169

Holding
- A state court cannot grant a writ of habeas corpus to a prisoner arrested under the authority of the United States and in federal custody.

Court membership
- Chief Justice Roger B. Taney Associate Justices John McLean · James M. Wayne; John Catron · Peter V. Daniel; Samuel Nelson · Robert C. Grier; John A. Campbell · Nathan Clifford

Case opinion
- Majority: Taney, joined by unanimous

Ableman v. Booth, 62 U.S. (21 How.) 506 (1859), was a United States Supreme Court case in which the Court unanimously held that state courts cannot issue rulings that contradict the decisions of federal courts, overturning a decision by the Supreme Court of Wisconsin. The Court found that under the Constitution, federal courts have the final power to decide cases arising under the Constitution and federal statutes, and that the States do not have the power to overturn those decisions. Thus, Wisconsin did not have the authority to nullify federal judgments or statutes. For example, it is illegal for state officials to interfere with the work of U.S. Marshals acting under federal laws. The Ableman decision emphasized the dual form of American government and the independence of State and federal courts from each other.

The federal law in question was a strengthened Fugitive Slave Act, which northern free states saw as violating their territorial integrity, and conflicting with their traditions of liberty.

== Background ==
In 1850, the Congress of the United States adopted a strengthened Fugitive Slave Act as part of the Compromise of 1850. Tensions over slavery in the United States, nonetheless, continued to rise.

In 1854, abolitionist editor Sherman Booth was arrested for violating the Act when he allegedly helped incite a mob to rescue an escaped slave, Joshua Glover, in Wisconsin from US Marshal Stephen V. R. Ableman. Booth sought a writ of habeas corpus from a Wisconsin state judge. The Wisconsin judge granted the writ, ordering Booth released from federal custody. The US Marshal appealed to the state supreme court, which ruled the federal law unconstitutional and affirmed Booth's release. When Ableman turned to the federal courts, the Wisconsin Supreme Court refused to recognize the authority of the federal courts, again ordered Booth's release, and declared the Fugitive Slave Act of 1850 unconstitutional. The Wisconsin Supreme Court thereby attempted to annul the judgment of the federal court. Glover escaped to Canada, beyond the reach of Federal law enforcement.

When the case was appealed, the Wisconsin Supreme Court even refused to send the record for review, despite a direct order by U.S. Chief Justice Roger Taney, thereby forcing the U.S. Supreme Court to issue a decision without the record.

== Decision ==
The case went to the U.S. Supreme Court. The Court, in a unanimous opinion written by Chief Justice Roger B. Taney, stated that the Wisconsin Supreme Court had effectively asserted the supremacy of state courts over federal courts in cases arising under the Constitution and laws of the United States. The Court noted that if the Wisconsin courts could annul the judgment of conviction by the federal district court in this case, then any state court could annul any conviction under federal law. The Court held that the states do not have that power.

The Court stated that in adopting the Constitution, the people granted certain powers to the federal government:

it was felt by the statesmen who framed the Constitution and by the people who adopted it that it was necessary that many of the rights of sovereignty which the States then possessed should be ceded to the General Government, and that, in the sphere of action assigned to it, it should be supreme, and strong enough to execute its own laws by its own tribunals, without interruption from a State or from State authorities.

This was accomplished by adoption of the Supremacy Clause, which makes federal law the supreme law of the land:

this Constitution, and the laws of the United States which shall be passed in pursuance thereof, and all treaties made, or which shall be made, under the authority of the United States, shall be the supreme law of the land, and the judges in every State shall be bound thereby, anything in the Constitution or laws of any State to the contrary notwithstanding.

The Court noted that the supremacy of federal law could be effective only if the federal government were given judicial power to enforce federal law. If the interpretation of the Constitution and federal statutes were left to the states, then

conflicting decisions would unavoidably take place... . The Constitution and laws and treaties of the United States, and the powers granted to the Federal Government, would soon receive different interpretations in different States, and the Government of the United States would soon become one thing in one State and another thing in another. It was essential, therefore, to its very existence as a Government that it should have the power of establishing courts of justice, altogether independent of State power, to carry into effect its own laws, and that a tribunal should be established in which all cases which might arise under the Constitution and laws and treaties of the United States, whether in a State court or a court of the United States, should be finally and conclusively decided.

Accordingly, said the Court, the Constitution granted this judicial power to the federal government. The Constitution provides in Article III that the judicial power in all cases arising under the Constitution or laws of the United States rests in the federal courts, and that the Supreme Court has appellate jurisdiction in all such cases.

Therefore, the Court concluded that the Constitution gives the federal courts the final authority in matters involving interpretation of the Constitution and laws of the United States. Because the Constitution grants this power to the federal courts, the state courts do not have the power to review or interfere with the judgments of federal courts in matters arising under the Constitution or laws of the United States. The Court therefore found that the power of the State of Wisconsin "is limited and restricted by the Constitution of the United States." Wisconsin did not have the power to nullify the judgment of the federal court or to hold the Fugitive Slave Act unconstitutional. Booth's conviction therefore was upheld.

== Aftermath ==
The case radicalized Wisconsin politics and furthered the polarization of the nation just before the American Civil War. The facts of the case and the early rulings occurred in 1854–1855. As a result, in the 1856 state elections, the new Wisconsin Republican party ran on a strong anti-Federal Fugitive Slave Act platform, and took both houses of the legislature. The new legislature required the state's U.S. Senate candidates to pledge their support for the Wisconsin Supreme Court.

Booth was ultimately pardoned for his offense by President James Buchanan shortly before he left office in 1861.

== See also ==
- List of United States Supreme Court cases, volume 62
- Dred Scott v. Sandford, 60 U.S. 393 (1856)

== Sources ==
- Hoiberg, Dale H., ed. (2010). "Ableman v. Booth". Encyclopædia Britannica. Vol. I: A-ak Bayes (15th ed.). Chicago, IL: Encyclopædia Britannica Inc. pp. 33–34. ISBN 978-1-59339-837-8.
