= Wisconsin's Brown County Assembly district =

Former American legislative district

Wisconsin's Brown County State Assembly district
- Obsolete
- Notes: 1848–1851; 1856–1866

Wisconsin's Brown County Assembly district was a district in the Wisconsin State Assembly in the early years of the history of the state of Wisconsin, prior to the legislative redistricting reforms of 1972 which created the current numbered districts. Located in northeast Wisconsin, the district comprised the whole of Brown County, Wisconsin, and was one of the 66 original Assembly districts defined in Article XIV of the Constitution of Wisconsin.

The district was in use for elections from 1848 through 1851, then again for elections from 1856 until 1866 (inclusive). Prior to 1852, Brown County's boundaries shifted several times; when Wisconsin achieved statehood in 1848, Brown County comprised nearly the entire northeast quadrant of the state, it shrunk as new counties were created from its former territory, and those changes affected the shape of the district over those early sessions.

== List of representatives ==
List of representatives from the Brown County district
Member	Party	Residence	Term start	Term end	Leg.
District created
David Agry	Dem.	Green Bay	June 5, 1848	January 1, 1849	1st
John F. Meade	Dem.	Green Bay	January 1, 1849	January 7, 1850	2nd
Charles D. Robinson	Dem.	Green Bay	January 7, 1850	January 6, 1851	3rd
John F. Lessey	Dem.	Green Bay	January 6, 1851	January 5, 1852	4th
Urial H. Peak	Dem.	Green Bay	January 5, 1852	January 3, 1853	5th
District abolished by 1852 Wisconsin Act 499; Brown County became part of the Brown–Door–Kewaunee district
District re-established by 1856 Wisconsin Act 109
Edgar Conklin	Rep.	Green Bay	January 5, 1857	January 4, 1858	10th 11th
William Field Jr.	Dem.	De Pere	January 3, 1859	January 2, 1860	12th
John C. Neville	Dem.	Green Bay	January 2, 1860	January 7, 1861	13th
Frederick S. Ellis	Dem.	Green Bay	January 1, 1861	January 1, 1864	14th 15th 16th
William J. Abrams	Dem.	Green Bay	January 1, 1864	January 7, 1867	17th 18th 19th
District abolished by 1866 Wisconsin Act 101; Brown County divided into the Brown 1st and Brown 2nd districts
