= List of mayors of Green Bay, Wisconsin =

Mayor of the City of Green Bay
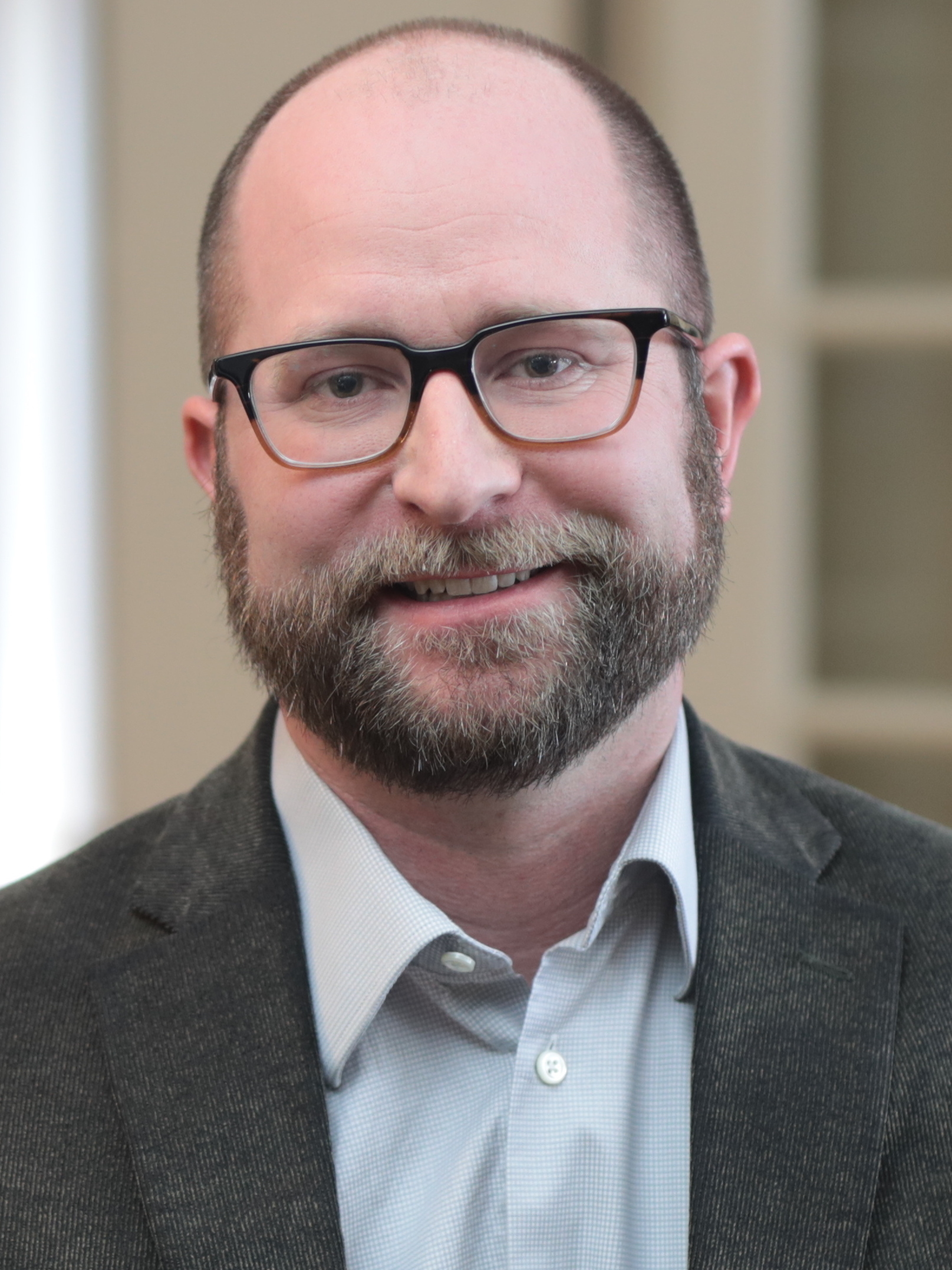
- Incumbent; Eric Genrich since April 15, 2019
- Term length: Four years, no term limit
- Constituting instrument: Green Bay Municipal Code
- Formation: 1854
- First holder: W. C. E. Thomas
- Salary: $91,445
- Website: Official website

Originally, the term of the mayor of Green Bay, Wisconsin, was one year. In 1904, the mayoral term was changed to two years. In 1967, the mayoral term was changed to four years.

The current mayor is Eric Genrich, who was officially sworn into office on April 15, 2019. The previous mayor, Jim Schmitt, was the longest-serving mayor in Green Bay's history, at 16 years (2003–2019).

== List of mayors ==
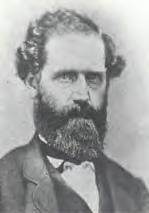
W. C. E. Thomas, first mayor of Green Bay

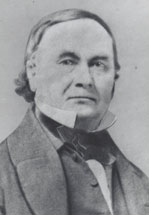
Henry S. Baird, 7th mayor of Green Bay

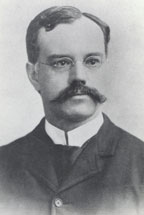
Arthur Neville, 19th mayor of Green Bay

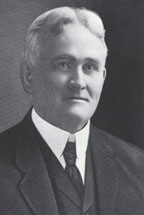
Robert Minahan, 24th mayor of Green Bay

#	Mayor	Sworn In	Left office	Terms	Comments
1	W. C. E. Thomas	1854	1855	1	
2	Francis X. Desnoyers	1855	1856	1	
3	H. E. Eastman	1856	1858	2	
4	Burley Follett	1858	1859	1	
5	Nathan Goodell	1859	1860	1	
6	Eleazor H. Ellis	1860	1861	1	
7	Henry S. Baird	1861	1863	2	
8	Burley Follett	1863	1864	1	Second non-consecutive term.
9	Nathan Goodell	1864	1865	1	Second non-consecutive term.
10	Myron P. Lindsley	1865	1866	1	
11	Charles D. Robinson	1866	1867	1	
12	James S. Marshall	1867	1868	1	
13	Anton Klaus	1868	1871	3	
14	Alonzo Kimball	1871	1872	1	
15	Charles D. Robinson	1872	1873	1	Second non-consecutive term.
16	Alonzo Kimball	1873	1874	1	Second non-consecutive term.
17	C. E. Crane	1874	1876	2	
18	Frederick S. Ellis	1876	1877	1	
19	C. E. Crane	1877	1880	3	Second non-consecutive term.
20	John C. Neville	1880	1881	1	
21	William J. Abrams	1881	1882	1	
22	J. H. M. Wigman	1882	1883	1	
23	William J. Abrams	1883	1885	2	Second non-consecutive term.
24	Charles Hartung	1885	1888	3	
25	Arthur C. Neville	1888	1890	2	
26	James H. Elmore	1890	1896	6	
27	Frank B. Desnoyers	1896	1899	3	
28	Simon J. Murphy Jr.	1899	1902	3	
29	J. H. Tayler	1902	1904	2	
30	Robert E. Minahan	1904	1908	2	Mayor's term changed to two years.
31	Winford Abrams	1908	1916	4	
32	Elmer Hall	1916	1921	2	
33	Wenzel Wiesner	1921	1927	5	
34	James H. McGillan	1927	1929	1	
35	John V. Diener	1929	1937	4	
36	John S. Farrell	1937	1938	1	
37	Alex Biemeret	1938	1945	3	
38	Dominic Olejniczak	1945	1955	5	
39	Otto Rachals	1955	1959	2	
40	Roman Denissen	1959	1965	3	
41	Donald Tilleman	1965	1972	2 1/2	Mayor's term changed to four years before the 1967 election. Died in office.
42	Harris Burgoyne	1972	1973	1/2	Served as mayor until a special election was held.
43	Thomas Atkinson	1973	1975	1/2	Served until the regular election in 1975.
44	Michael Monfils	1975	1979	1	
45	Sam Halloin	1979	1995	4	
46	Paul Jadin	1995	2003	2	
47	Jim Schmitt	2003	2019	4	
48	Eric Genrich	2019	present	1	Incumbent
