= 1869 Wisconsin gubernatorial election =

- November 2, 1869
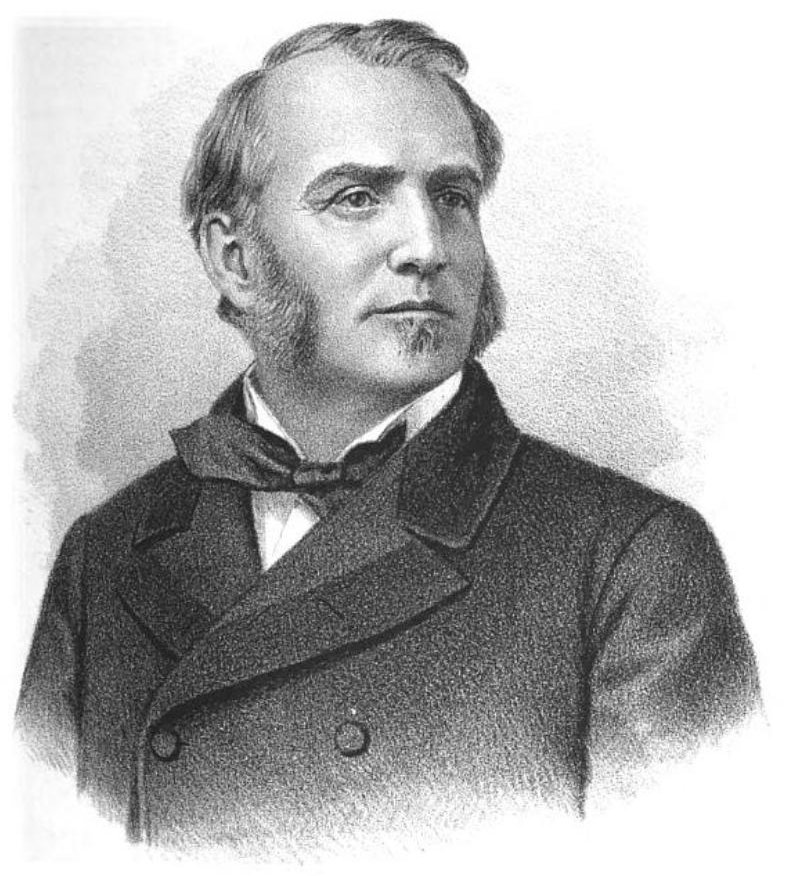

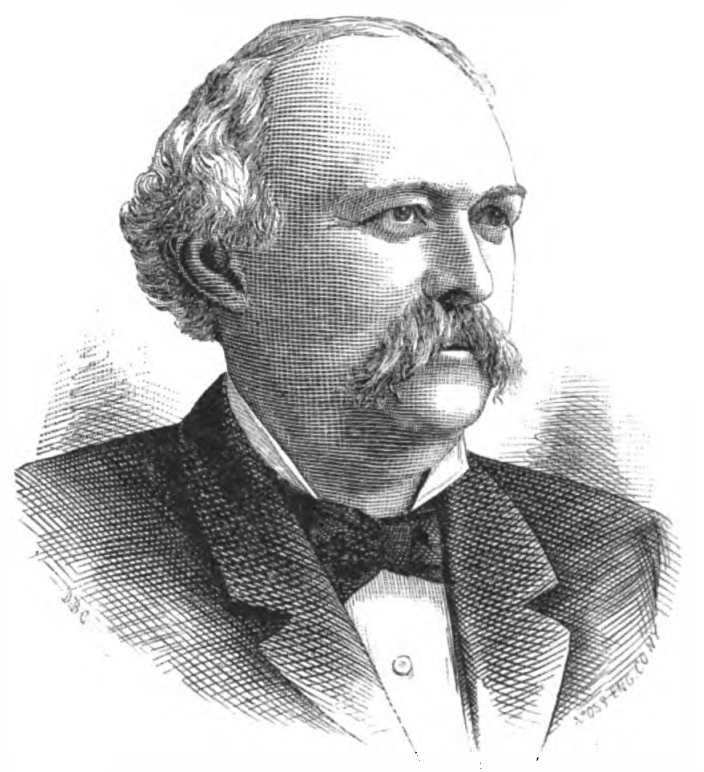
Nominee	Lucius Fairchild	Charles D. Robinson
Party	Republican	Democratic
Popular vote	69,502	61,239
Percentage	53.14%	46.83%
- County results Fairchild : 50–60% 60–70% 70–80% 80–90% >90% Robinson : 50–60% 60–70% 70–80% 80–90%
Governor before election
Lucius Fairchild
Republican
Elected Governor
Lucius Fairchild
Republican

The 1869 Wisconsin gubernatorial election was held on November 2, 1869. Incumbent Republican Party governor Lucius Fairchild won re-election with over 53% of the vote, defeating Democratic candidate Charles D. Robinson. Fairchild became the first person to win three terms as governor of Wisconsin.

Fond du Lac County voted for the losing candidate for the first time ever, ending the longest bellwether streak in Wisconsin at the time.

== Nominations ==
=== Republican party ===
Lucius Fairchild was the incumbent Governor of Wisconsin, having been elected in the 1865 election and re-elected in 1867. Prior to his election as Governor, he was Wisconsin Secretary of State for one term. Fairchild had also been a Union Army officer in the American Civil War, having served as a colonel in the famous Iron Brigade when they participated in fierce fighting at Gettysburg. Fairchild lost an arm due to wounds sustained at Gettysburg, and was later awarded an honorary promotion to brigadier general.

=== Democratic party ===
Charles D. Robinson was a businessman and newspaper publisher and had been the 3rd Secretary of State of Wisconsin. Prior to his nomination for Governor, Robinson had served in the Wisconsin State Assembly for one term, in 1850, had served as a Quartermaster with the Union Army during the American Civil War, and served one term as Mayor of Green Bay, Wisconsin, in 1866. He was the creator, writer, and publisher of the Democratic paper The Green Bay Advocate since 1846.

==== Other candidates ====
- Nicholas D. Fratt, of Racine, Wisconsin, was a respected farmer and businessman who had served one term in the Wisconsin State Senate. He was founder and president of the Racine County Bank.
- David W. Jones, of Iowa County, Wisconsin, had been the 5th Secretary of State of Wisconsin.

== Results ==
1869 Wisconsin gubernatorial election
Party	Candidate	Votes	%	±%
Republican	Lucius Fairchild (incumbent)	69,502	53.14%	+1.48%
Democratic	Charles D. Robinson	61,239	46.83%	−1.50%
	Scattering	40	0.03%	
Majority		8,263	6.32%	
Total votes		130,781	100.00%	
Republican hold		Swing	+2.98%	

=== Results by county ===
County	Lucius Fairchild Republican		Charles D. Robinson Democratic		Margin		Total votes cast
County	#	%	#	%	#	%	Total votes cast
Adams	575	75.07%	191	24.93%	384	50.13%	766
Ashland	1	3.23%	30	96.77%	-29	-93.55%	31
Barron	123	100.00%	0	0.00%	123	100.00%	123
Bayfield	43	68.25%	19	30.16%	24	38.10%	63 (Note: Includes 1 Scattering vote)
Brown	783	31.56%	1,698	68.44%	-915	-36.88%	2,481
Buffalo	875	67.93%	413	32.07%	462	35.87%	1,288
Burnett	74	96.10%	3	3.90%	71	92.21%	77
Calumet	676	40.00%	1,014	60.00%	-338	-20.00%	1,690
Chippewa	593	45.93%	698	54.07%	-105	-8.13%	1,291
Clark	381	74.41%	131	25.59%	250	48.83%	512
Columbia	2,185	61.93%	1,342	38.04%	843	23.89%	3,528
Crawford	851	49.33%	874	50.67%	-23	-1.33%	1,725
Dane	3,829	53.72%	3,295	46.23%	534	7.49%	7,128 (Note: Includes 4 Scattering votes)
Dodge	2,419	36.44%	4,220	63.56%	-1,801	-27.13%	6,639
Door	390	65.22%	208	34.78%	182	30.43%	598
Douglas	39	41.94%	54	58.06%	-15	-16.13%	93
Dunn	926	79.42%	240	20.58%	686	58.83%	1,166
Eau Claire	791	66.92%	391	33.08%	400	33.84%	1,182
Fond du Lac	3,071	48.22%	3,289	51.64%	-218	-3.42%	6,369 (Note: Includes 9 Scattering votes)
Grant	3,008	67.08%	1,476	32.92%	1,532	34.17%	4,484
Green	2,002	68.51%	920	31.49%	1,082	37.03%	2,922
Green Lake	1,020	68.27%	474	31.73%	546	36.55%	1,494
Iowa	1,413	52.82%	1,262	47.18%	151	5.64%	2,675
Jackson	744	70.19%	316	29.81%	428	40.38%	1,060
Jefferson	2,136	43.83%	2,737	56.17%	-601	-12.33%	4,873
Juneau	913	54.18%	772	45.82%	141	8.37%	1,685
Kenosha	1,081	54.57%	898	45.33%	183	9.24%	1,981 (Note: Includes 2 Scattering votes)
Kewaunee	288	33.96%	560	66.04%	-272	-32.08%	848
La Crosse	1,688	61.40%	1,060	38.56%	628	22.84%	2,749
Lafayette	1,285	45.12%	1,563	54.88%	-278	-9.76%	2,848
Manitowoc	1,502	41.08%	2,154	58,92%	-652	-17.83%	3,656
Marathon	131	18.07%	594	81.93%	-463	-63.86%	725
Marquette	466	35.04%	864	64.96%	-398	-29.92%	1,330
Milwaukee	3,127	34.95%	5,819	65.04%	-2,692	-30.09%	8,947
Monroe	1,095	63.11%	640	36.89%	455	26.22%	1,735
Oconto	589	60.60%	383	39.40%	206	21.19%	972
Outagamie	923	38.36%	1,483	61.64%	-560	-23.28%	2,406
Ozaukee	330	17.81%	1,523	82.19%	-1,193	-64.38%	1,853
Pepin	352	69.16%	157	30.84%	195	38.31%	509
Pierce	837	68.05%	393	31.95%	444	36.10%	1,230
Polk	359	67.23%	175	32.77%	184	34.46%	534
Portage	736	63.23%	428	36.77%	308	26.46%	1,164
Racine	1,748	58.11%	1,252	41.62%	496	16.49%	3,008 (Note: Includes 8 Scattering votes)
Richland	1,247	58.35%	890	41.65%	357	16.71%	2,137
Rock	3,227	73.49%	1,159	26.39%	2,068	47.10%	4,391 (Note: Includes 5 Scattering votes)
Sauk	1,847	71.07%	752	28.93%	1,095	42.13%	2,599
Shawano	212	51.71%	198	48.29%	14	3.41%	410
Sheboygan	1,763	50.06%	1,758	49.91%	5	0.14%	3,522
St. Croix	985	61.64%	613	38.36%	372	23.28%	1,598
Trempealeau	642	82.20%	139	17.80%	503	64.40%	781
Vernon	1,426	82.52%	298	17.25%	1,128	65.28%	1,728
Walworth	2,472	67.76%	1,175	32.21%	1,297	35.55%	3,648
Washington	690	22.46%	2,382	77.54%	-1,692	-55.08%	3,072
Waukesha	2,177	44.92%	2,668	55.06%	-491	-10.13%	4,846
Waupaca	1,620	68.67%	739	31.33%	881	37.35%	2,359
Waushara	1,133	82.94%	233	17.06%	900	65.89%	1,366
Winnebago	3,407	62.83%	2,016	37.17%	1,391	25.65%	5,423
Wood	256	55.29%	206	44.49%	50	10.80%	463
Total	69,502	53.14%	61,239	46.83%	8,263	6.32%	130,781

==== Counties that flipped from Democratic to Republican ====
- Shawano
- Sheboygan
- Wood

==== Counties that flipped from Republican to Democratic ====
- Fond du Lac
