= Neville Public Museum of Brown County =

Museum in Green Bay, Wisconsin

- Neville Public Museum
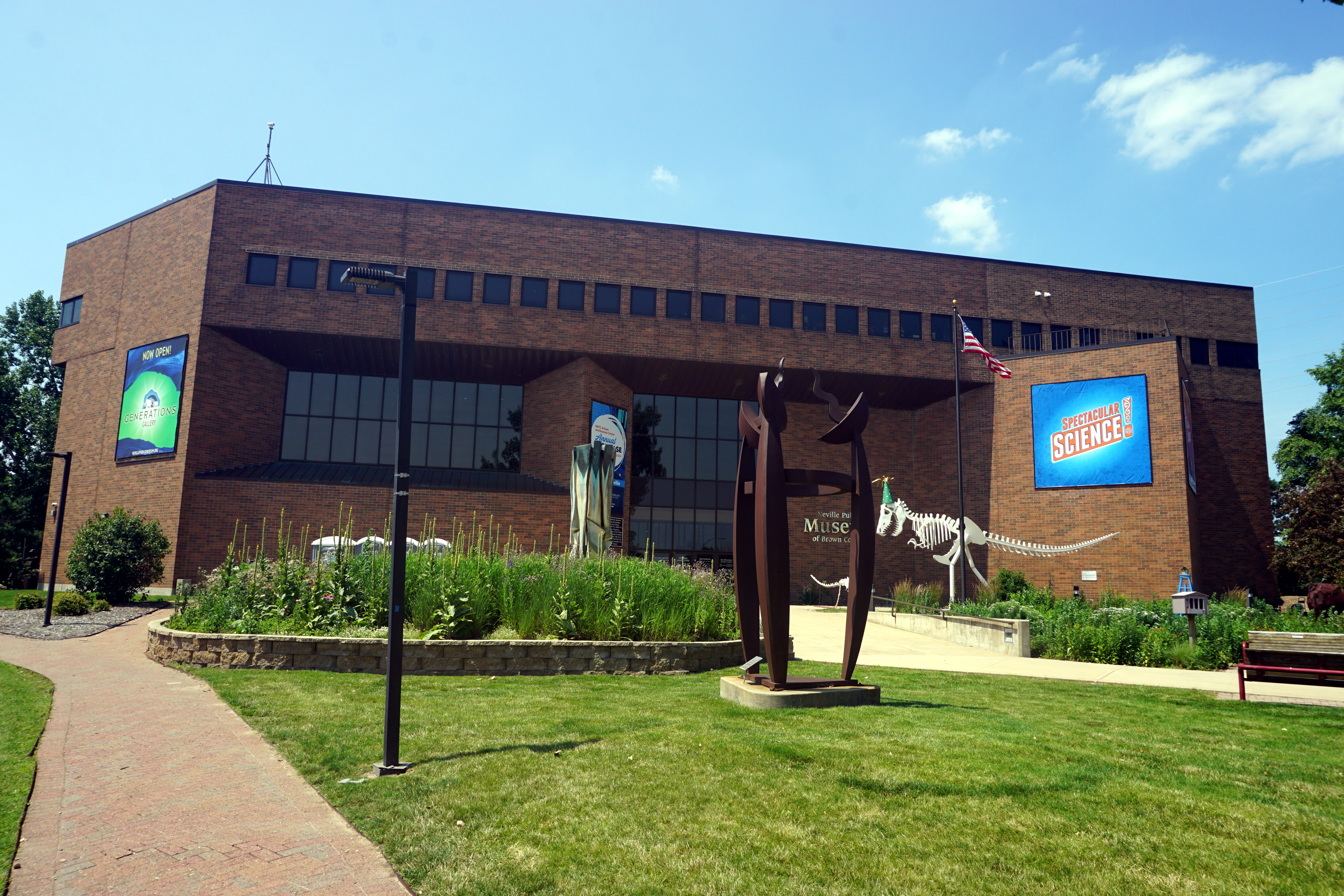
- The museum in 2024
- Established: 23 July 1927
- Location: Green Bay, Wisconsin
- Coordinates: 44°31′04″N 88°01′07″W
- Public transit access: Green Bay Metro
- Website: www.nevillepublicmuseum.org

The Neville Public Museum of Brown County is an accredited cultural institution that champions history, science and art, named for Green Bay's 25th mayor, Arthur C. Neville. Located in downtown Green Bay, Wisconsin, the museum is dedicated to the collection and preservation of significant objects relevant to Northeast Wisconsin and the Upper Peninsula of Michigan. The museum seeks to bridge these multi-generational regional communities through engaging exhibits and dynamic programming. The museum is also the trail head for the Packers Heritage Trail.

== History ==
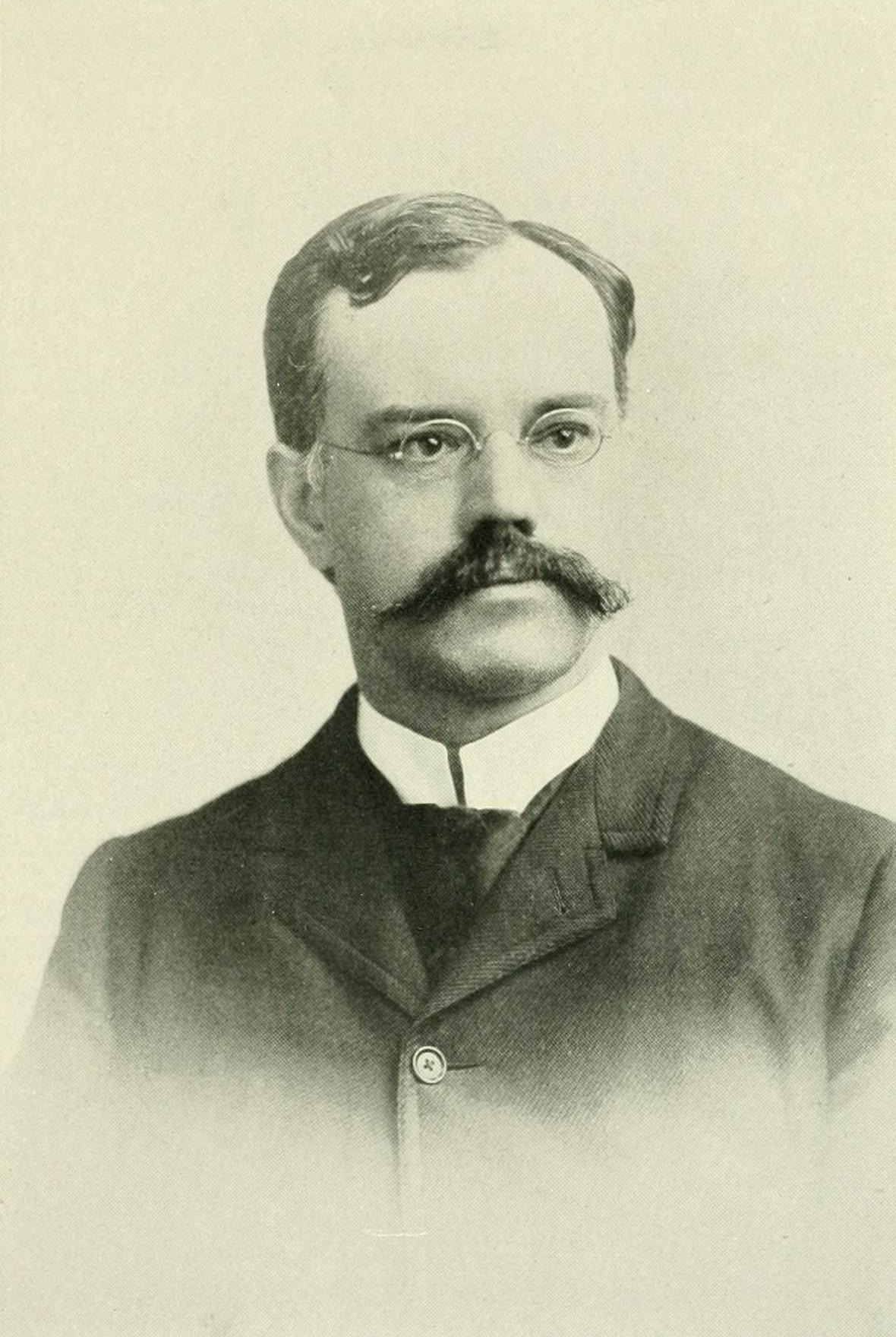
Arthur C. Neville

The museum traces its origins to a 1915 exhibit of rare and historic artifacts presented by the Green Bay Art Club in the basement of the local library. The exhibit soon outgrew its facilities, and, in 1923, a new museum was funded by a donation from Mr. and Mrs. George Grant Mason of New York. Mrs. Mason asked that the museum be named for her mother and step-father, Mr. and Mrs. Arthur C. Neville, to honor their "work towards civic betterment in Green Bay." Arthur C. Neville was a respected lawyer and historian in Green Bay, and had been Mayor from 1888 through 1890. The new museum opened in July 1927, and Arthur Neville was director until his death in 1929.

In April 1980, Brown County approved a referendum funding construction a new building for the museum. The new museum building opened in April 1983. The museum was free to visitors until 2004.
