= Robert E. Minahan =

American doctor and mayor (1858–1935)

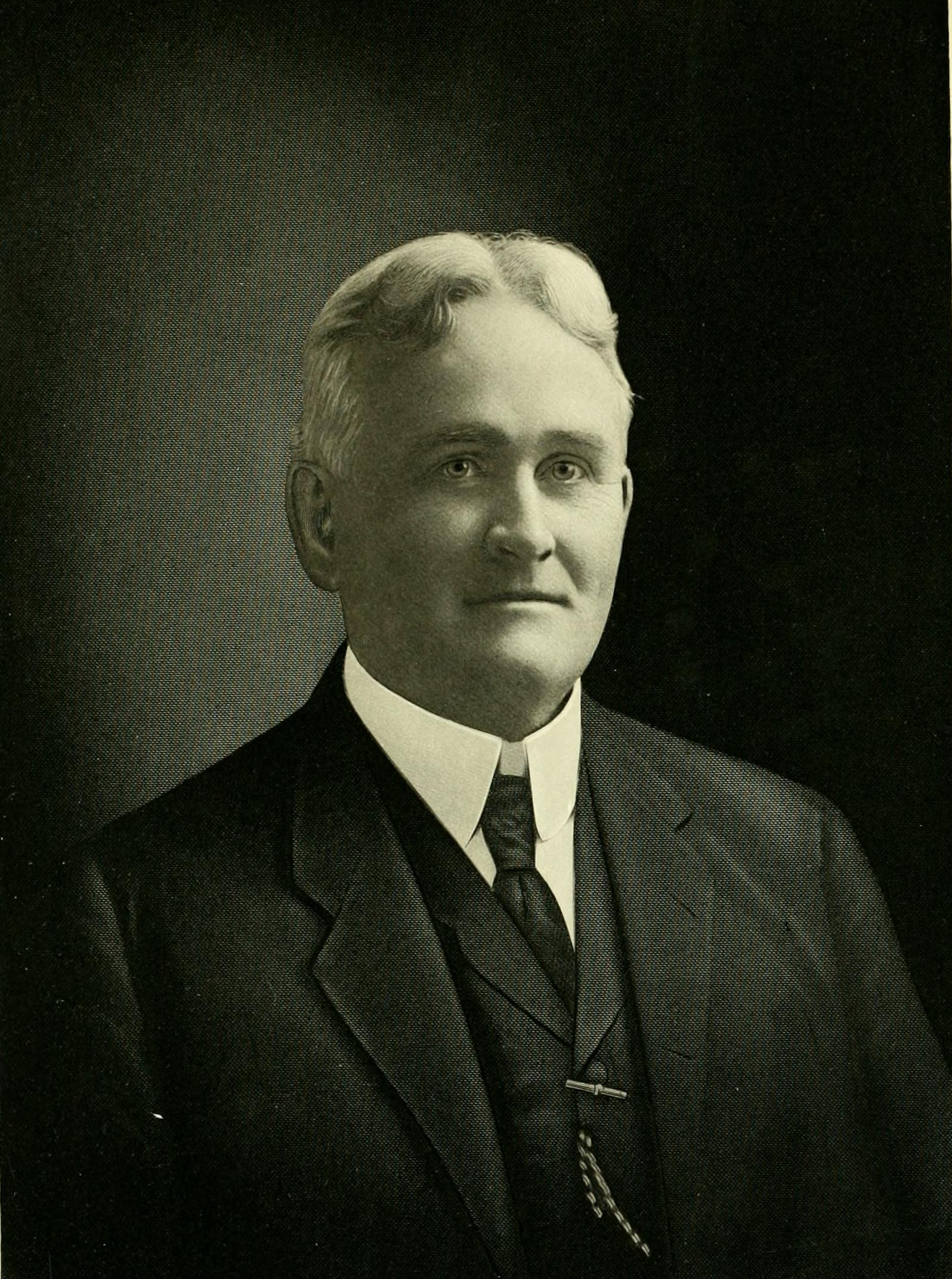

30th Mayor of Green Bay, Wisconsin
- In office April 1904 – April 1908
- Preceded by: J. H. Tayler
- Succeeded by: Winford Abrams

Personal details
- Born: January 27, 1858 Howard, New York, U.S.
- Died: April 27, 1935 (aged 77) Green Bay, Wisconsin, U.S.
- Resting place: Woodlawn Cemetery, Green Bay, Wisconsin
- Spouse: Ellen "Nellie" Mulcahy (m. 1880–1935)
- Children: Eben Roger Minahan^{(b. 1882; died 1928)}
- Education: Oshkosh State Normal School; Rush Medical College (M.D.); University of Michigan Law School
- Profession: physician, surgeon, lawyer

Robert E. Minahan (January 27, 1858 – April 27, 1935) was an American physician, surgeon, and lawyer. He was the 30th Mayor of Green Bay, Wisconsin.

== Early life and career ==
Minahan was born in Howard, New York, in 1858. He was still a child when he moved with his family to Calumet County, Wisconsin, in 1860, settling near New Holstein. He and his brother, John, decided as children that they wanted to become doctors. They collaborated through their youth to achieve that goal.

Minahan received a public school education, and then entered the State Normal School at Oshkosh, Wisconsin, where he graduated in 1880. He went to work as a teacher for two years at Cedarburg, Wisconsin, where he saved money to continue his education. In 1882, he moved to Chicago with his wife and brother to study at Rush Medical College. While Robert studied, John worked as a street car operator to pay for expenses. After earning his M.D. in 1886, Robert went to work at Calumet Harbor, Wisconsin, and paid for his brother, John, to enter medical school.

After six years practicing medicine, in 1892, went back to school at the University of Michigan Law School and received his law degree. Returning to Wisconsin, he practiced both medicine and law at Kewaunee, Wisconsin, from 1895 to 1898. In 1898, he moved to Green Bay, where he formed a partnership with his brother, John, who was also now a medical doctor. They specialized in surgery and had their own facilities at Green Bay's St. Vincent Hospital. The Minahan brothers were renowned for their work advancing surgical techniques in the early 20th century, and were specifically mentioned by Dr. William James Mayo in a 1926 address to the national medical society.

== Mayoral terms ==
In 1904, Minahan was elected to a two-year term as Mayor of Green Bay by what, at the time, was said to be the largest margin ever given in a Green Bay mayoral race. His administration was notable for its treatment of illegal gambling in the city. Over the past several administrations, gambling equipment had often been confiscated by authorities, but was later returned after a fee had been paid. Under Mayor Minahan, however, a coordinated roundup was conducted in April 1905 to confiscate all the gambling devices and bring them to city hall. There, in a public display, Minahan personally smashed all the machines with an axe, then lit the remains on fire. Afterwards, he received death threats and briefly had to hire private security. Minahan was elected without opposition in 1906 to a second two-year term.

While Mayor, Minahan was elected President of the Bank of Green Bay and remained for several years.

== Later years ==
Just before leaving office, in December 1907, Minahan was named the surgeon for the Chicago and Northwestern Railroad, to succeed his brother, John, who left that position to become surgeon for the Chicago, Milwaukee, and St. Paul Railroad.

Minahan later became associated with other moral movements, and became an outspoken proponent for the prohibition of alcohol. In 1917, he joined former United States Secretary of State William Jennings Bryan speaking in favor of prohibition at an event in Madison.

== Personal life and family ==
Robert Minahan was the eldest of seven children born to Irish American immigrants William and Mary Minahan.

His brother William also became a medical doctor. William, along with their sister, Daisy, and William's wife, Lillian, were passengers of the RMS Titanic when it infamously sunk in 1912. William died in the disaster, but Daisy and Lillian were among the 710 survivors. Daisy and Lillian briefly came to live with Robert and his wife after William's death.

Later in life, his brother John made a substantial donation to St. Norbert College to construct a new football stadium, which was named in his honor as the John R. Minahan Memorial Stadium.

His youngest brother, Victor Ivan Minahan, was a lawyer and editor of the Green Bay Press-Gazette and the Appleton Post-Crescent.

On December 28, 1880, Robert Minahan married Ellen "Nellie" Mulcahy, who he had met while living in Calumet County. They had one son together, Eben Roger Minahan. Eben became a successful lawyer, but only lived to age 46, dying of meningitis in 1928.

Dr. Minahan and his wife died in 1935 and 1936, respectively, after long illnesses. Both died at their home in Green Bay, which still stands at 840 South Monroe Avenue. They were survived by three grandchildren.

== Electoral history ==
Green Bay Mayoral Election, 1904
Party	Candidate	Votes	%
General Election, April 5, 1904
Republican	Robert E. Minahan	2,897	75.74%
Democratic	James H. McGillan	772	20.18%
Socialist	John G. Jaklon	156	4.08%
Plurality		2,125	55.56%
Total votes		3,825	100.0%

Political offices
Preceded by J. H. Tayler	Mayor of Green Bay, Wisconsin; April 1904 – April 1908	Succeeded by Winford Abrams
