= C. E. Crane =

American physician, Mayor of Green Bay, and Union Army surgeon in the American Civil War

Charles Edward Crane
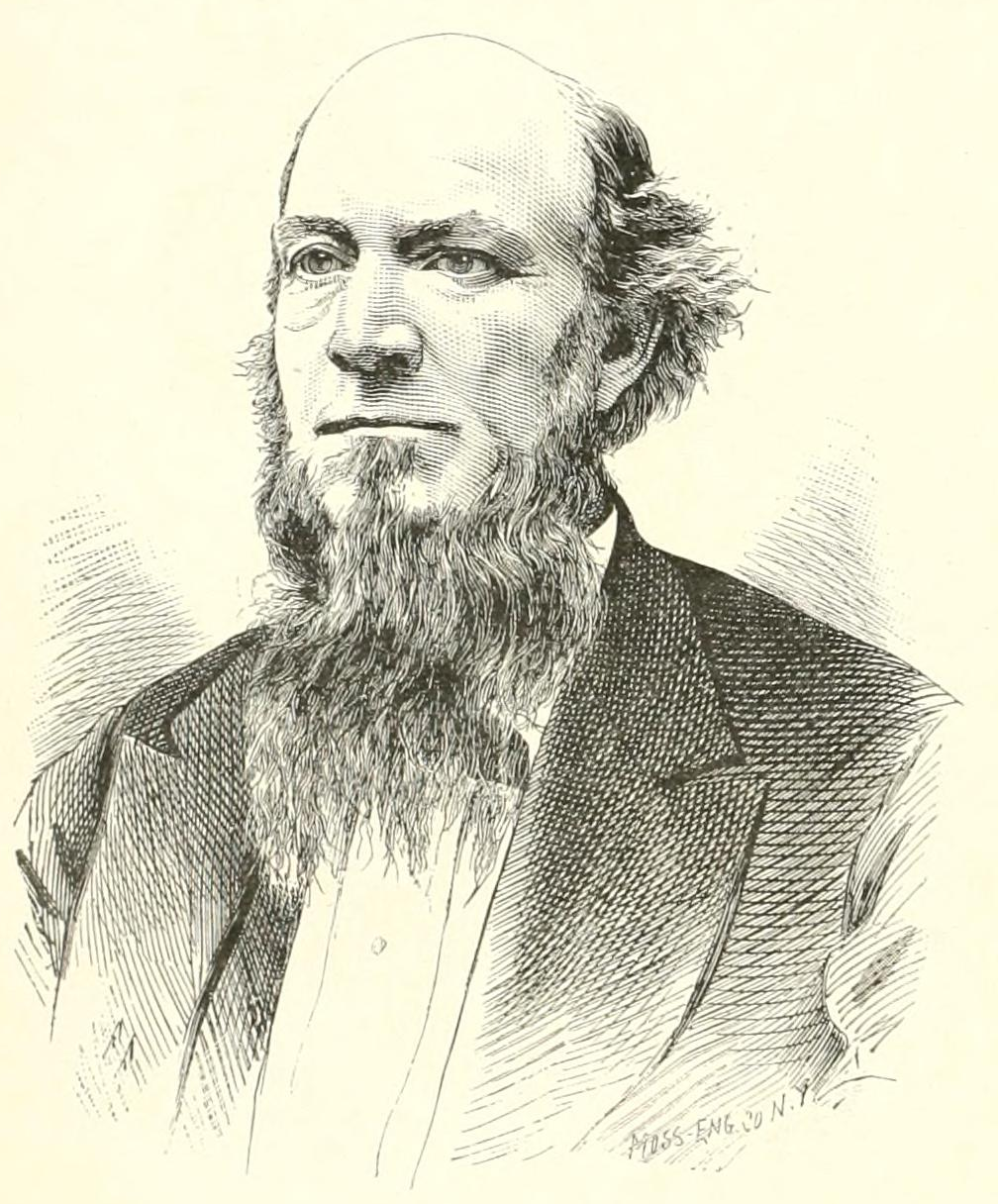

17th and 19th Mayor of Green Bay, Wisconsin
- In office April 1877 – April 1880
- Preceded by: Frederick S. Ellis
- Succeeded by: J. C. Neville
- In office April 1874 – April 1876
- Preceded by: Alonzo Kimball
- Succeeded by: Frederick S. Ellis

Personal details
- Born: November 27, 1827 Huron County, Ohio
- Died: May 8, 1897 (aged 69)
- Cause of death: Throat cancer
- Party: Democratic
- Spouses: Louise (Beard) Desnoyers; (m. 1872)
- Profession: Physician

Military service
- Allegiance: United States
- Branch/service: United States Army; Union Army
- Years of service: 1861–1864
- Rank: Surgeon
- Unit: 5th Reg. Wis. Vol. Infantry
- Battles/wars: American Civil War

Charles Edward Crane (November 27, 1827 – May 8, 1897) was an American physician and politician. He was the 17th and 19th Mayor of Green Bay, Wisconsin, and served as a surgeon for the Union Army in the American Civil War.

== Biography ==
Crane was born on November 27, 1827, in Huron County, Ohio. He was raised in Erie County, Ohio, before moving to Norwalk, Ohio. Crane graduated from Western Reserve College and moved to Green Bay in 1846. Soon after, he opened a medical practice.

During the American Civil War, he served as surgeon for the 5th Wisconsin Volunteer Infantry Regiment in the Union Army. The 5th Wisconsin was engaged in many of the critical battles of the eastern theater of the war, including Antietam, Fredericksburg, and Gettysburg.

After the war, he was one of the organizers of the Brown County Medical Society, and served as its president from 1868 to 1880. Crane was elected mayor of Green Bay five times: in 1874, 1875, 1877, 1878, and 1879. In addition, he was president of the school board and a member of the board of health. In 1879, he formed a partnership with Louis Carabin in Green Bay—Crane & Carabin, physicians and surgeons. Their offices were located at 124 Washington Street.

In 1872, he married Louise Desnoyers (1827–1889), the daughter of Captain Thomas Baird and widow of former Green Bay mayor Francis X. Desnoyers. Crane died from throat cancer on May 8, 1897.

Political offices
Preceded by Alonzo Kimball	Mayor of Green Bay, Wisconsin; 1874 – 1876	Succeeded by Frederick S. Ellis
Preceded by Frederick S. Ellis	Mayor of Green Bay, Wisconsin; 1877 – 1880	Succeeded by J. C. Neville
