= Winford Abrams =

American politician (1868–1921)

31st Mayor of Green Bay, Wisconsin
- In office April 1908 – April 1916
- Preceded by: Robert E. Minahan
- Succeeded by: Elmer S. Hall

Personal details
- Born: January 20, 1868 Green Bay, Wisconsin, U.S.
- Died: September 18, 1921 (aged 53) Green Bay, Wisconsin, U.S.
- Resting place: Woodlawn Cemetery, Green Bay, Wisconsin
- Spouse: Ottilia Rhode
- Children: 1
- Parents: William J. Abrams (father); Henrietta T. (Alton) Abrams (mother)

Winford Abrams (January 20, 1868 – September 18, 1921) was an American public administrator and politician. He was the 31st mayor of Green Bay, Wisconsin.

== Biography ==
Abrams was born on January 20, 1868. His father, W. J. Abrams, was also mayor of Green Bay, as well as a member of the Wisconsin State Senate and Wisconsin State Assembly.

== Career ==
Abrams was elected to the Green Bay City Council in 1902. In 1904, he was selected to be president of the City Council during the tenure of Mayor Robert E. Minahan. Abrams became mayor in 1908 and served in that role until 1916. In 1918, he became vice mayor, serving under Elmer Hall. Hall resigned in January 1921 to take office as Secretary of State of Wisconsin, at which time Abrams once again became Green Bay's chief executive. He remained so until the election of Wenzel Wiesner in April.

== Personal ==
Abrams married Ottila Rhode (1869–1946). They had one daughter. Abrams died from complications due to problems with his heart and Bright's disease on September 18, 1921. He is buried in Allouez, Wisconsin.

Political offices
Preceded by Robert E. Minahan	Mayor of Green Bay, Wisconsin; April 1908 – April 1916	Succeeded by Elmer Hall
