= Arthur Neville =

Arthur Neville may refer to:

- Art Neville (1937–2019), American singer, songwriter and keyboardist
- Arthur C. Neville (1850–1929), mayor of Green Bay, Wisconsin
