= William J. Abrams =

19th century American railroad surveyor, businessman, and politician

W. J. Abrams
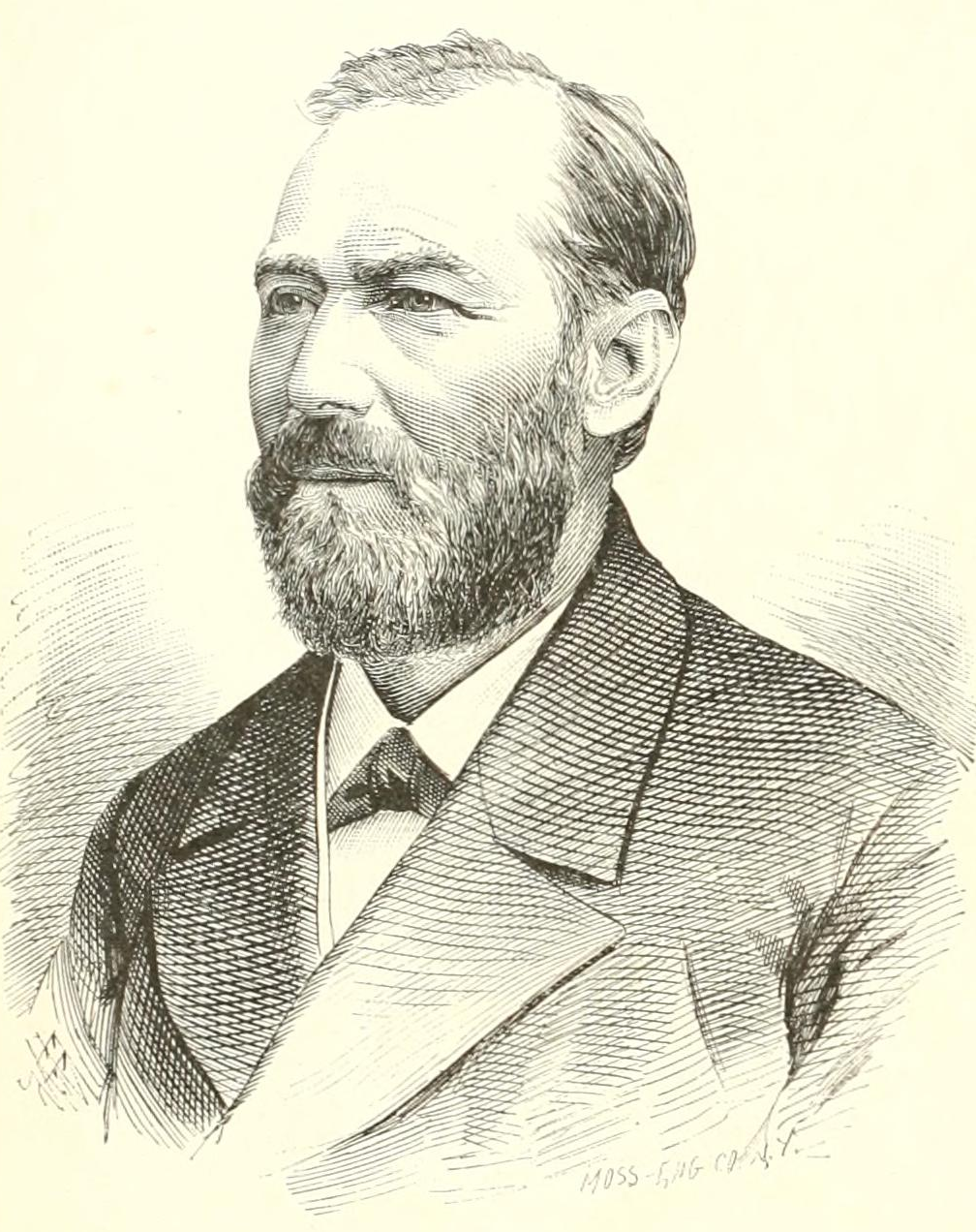

21st & 23rd Mayor of Green Bay, Wisconsin
- In office April 1883 – April 1885
- Preceded by: J. H. M. Wigman
- Succeeded by: Charles Hartung
- In office April 1881 – April 1882
- Preceded by: John C. Neville
- Succeeded by: J. H. M. Wigman

Member of the Wisconsin Senate from the 2nd district
- In office January 6, 1868 – January 3, 1870
- Preceded by: Matthew J. Meade
- Succeeded by: Lyman Walker

Member of the Wisconsin State Assembly from the Brown 1st district
- In office January 4, 1864 – January 6, 1868
- Preceded by: Frederick S. Ellis
- Succeeded by: John B. Eugene

Personal details
- Born: March 19, 1829 Cambridge, New York, U.S.
- Died: September 12, 1900 (aged 71) Green Bay, Wisconsin, U.S.
- Resting place: Woodlawn Cemetery, Green Bay, Wisconsin
- Party: Democratic
- Spouse: Henrietta T. Alton Abrams
- Children: Kate Abrams; Ruth Abrams; Winford Abrams
- Parents: Isaac T. Abrams (father); Ruth (Hall) Abrams (mother)
- Profession: Railroad surveyor Railroad businessman Politician

William J. Abrams (March 19, 1829 – September 12, 1900) was an American railroad surveyor, railroad businessman, and politician. He served as a member of the Wisconsin State Senate and the Assembly, and was the 21st and 23rd mayor of Green Bay, Wisconsin. His name was often abbreviated as W. J. Abrams.

== Early life ==
Abrams was born in Cambridge, New York, the son of Fosdick Abrams (1797–?) and Elizabeth B. Abrams (née Lake, 1798–1893). He attended school in Cambridge and Troy, New York, before studying theology in Williamstown, Massachusetts. He was not able to finish his studies due to poor health.

== Career ==
Abrams completed railroad surveys from Lake Michigan to Ontonogan, Michigan before moving to Wisconsin in 1856, and settling in Green Bay in 1861. He was involved in water transportation facilities before becoming a railroad businessman. He was a promoter for the Green Bay and Lake Pepin Railroad, which would become the Green Bay and Western Railroad.

Abrams served as Chairman of the Board and President for the railroad.

Abrams was a Democratic member of the State Assembly from 1864 to 1867 and the State Senate from 1868 to 1869. He was later mayor of Green Bay in 1881 and again from 1883 to 1884. He served as vice-president of the Soldiers Orphans Home in Madison, Wisconsin.

In 1881, Abrams owned land where the Chicago, Milwaukee, and St. Paul Railroad built a depot in the area that was to become Abrams, Wisconsin. The town of Abrams was named in his honor.

Abrams died on September 12, 1900, in Green Bay, Wisconsin and is interred at Woodlawn Cemetery. He was 71 years old.

== Personal life ==
In 1854, Abrams married Henrietta T. Alton (1832–1919). They had three children: Kate, Ruth, and Winford. Their son Winford also served as mayor of Green Bay.

Wisconsin State Assembly
Preceded by Frederick S. Ellis	Member of the Wisconsin State Assembly from the Brown 1st district January 4, 1864 – January 6, 1868	Succeeded by John B. Eugene
Wisconsin Senate
Preceded by Matthew J. Meade	Member of the Wisconsin Senate from the 2nd district January 6, 1868 – January 3, 1870	Succeeded by Lyman Walker
Political offices
Preceded by John C. Neville	Mayor of Green Bay, Wisconsin; April 1881 – April 1882	Succeeded by J. H. M. Wigman
Preceded by J. H. M. Wigman	Mayor of Green Bay, Wisconsin; April 1883 – April 1885	Succeeded by Charles Hartung
