= Abbie C. B. Robinson =

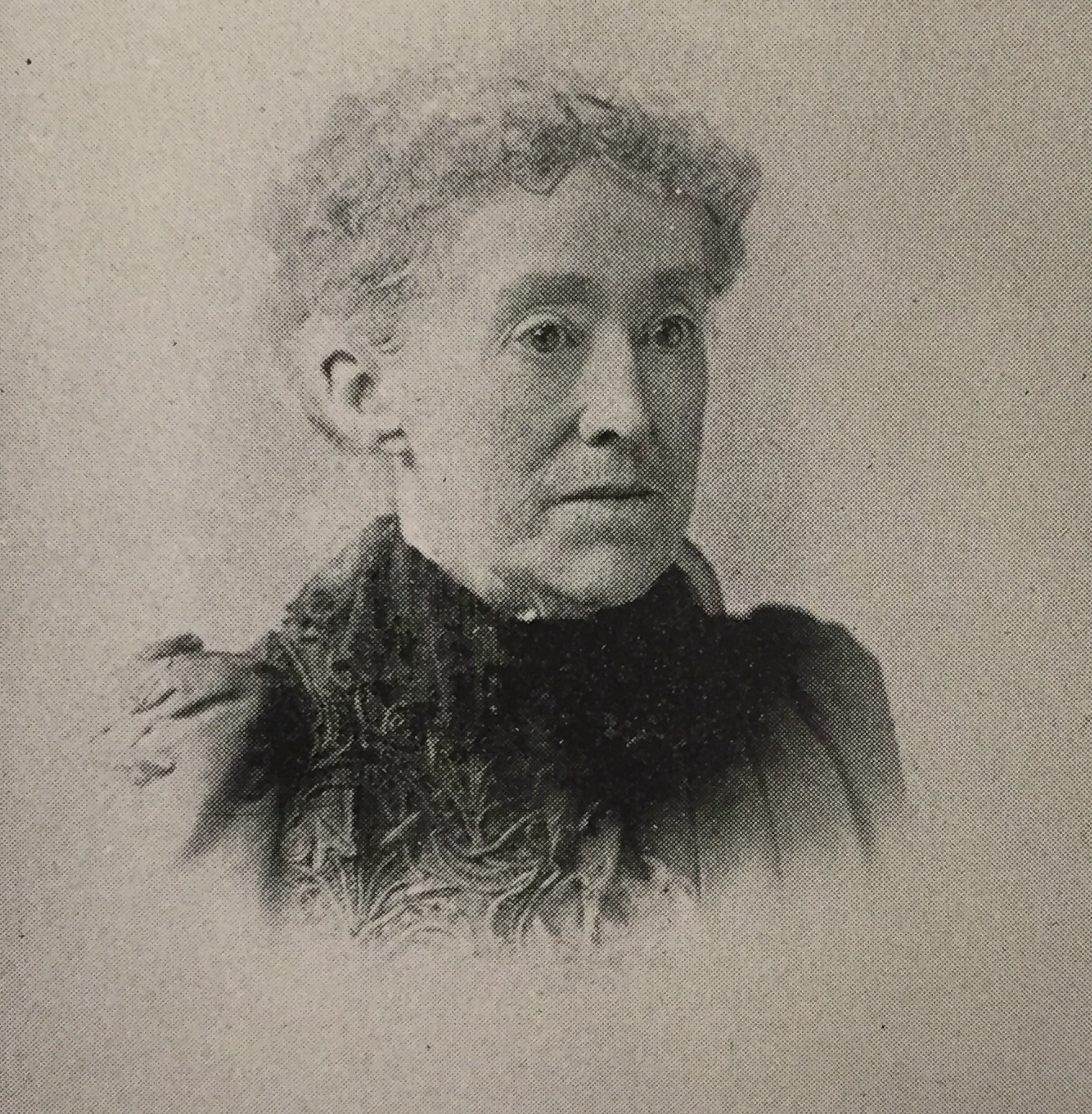
- Abbie C. B. Robinson, depicted in A Woman of the Century
- Born: Abigail Colburn Ballou; September 18, 1828; Woonsocket, Rhode Island, U.S.
- Died: February 18, 1893 (aged 64); Providence, Rhode Island, U.S.
- Resting place: Oak Hill Cemetery, Woonsocket, Rhode Island
- Spouse: Charles D. Robinson (m. 1854; died 1886)

Abigail Colburn Ballou Robinson (September 18, 1828 – February 18, 1893) was an American political writer and editor of the Green Bay Advocate.

== Early life and family ==
Abigail Colburn Ballou was born in Woonsocket, Rhode Island, on September 18, 1828. Her father was George Colburn Ballou (1798-1876), a cousin of Rev. Hosea Ballou and of President James A. Garfield's mother, Eliza Ballou. Her mother's maiden name was Ruth Eliza Aldrich (1801–1873). She had four siblings: Celia Ann Ballou Arnold (1825-1906), Oliver Aldrich Ballou (1827-1827), Alpha Bartlett Ballou Brown (1830-1884), and David Ballou (1833-1908).

George C. Ballou, a Universalist, opened a Woonsocket spinning mill in 1829. He later bought control of several mills, and acquired a huge amount of farming lands. He died a millionaire.

She was a woman of ideas quite in advance of her time, brought up, as her ancestors had been, under the Quaker system of repression. The daughter inherited from both parents qualities of devotion, courage and mental strength.

She was educated in her native town and in New England boarding-schools. She studied music in Boston and spent three years in Warren Seminary, Rhode Island. She took the regular course in the institute in Pittsfield, Massachusetts.

== Career ==
Robinson was as famous for political wisdom as her husband. Of her newspaper career it is somewhat difficult to write, since her public work was so closely interwoven with her private experiences during the very sorrowful and troublous period of her connection with the "Advocate." She went into the office of that paper by the usual route, the desire to help her husband, in the early part of 1882, as Colonel Robinson's health was failing rapidly. Gradually, the sick man's duties fell to his devoted wife, and before long she assumed charge of them all, taking the place in the office while she performed her own duties at home, doubly increased by the care of a dying husband.

After three years of editorial management of the Advocate, she was placed in a position to assume control of the whole establishment connected with the paper, including not only the business management, but also a job department, a bindery and store. That position she held for four years, during which time Colonel Robinson died. Then came the inevitable result, nervous prostration, an attempt again to take up the work, then her final retirement from the paper in 1888.

She established a reputation as a respected political writer and editor of the Green Bay Advocate, gaining recognition for her influential journalism and accomplished writing.

The story of her having brought out a Republican issue of the paper, when it was once put under her charge during Colonel Robinson's editorship, is a standard joke, and is periodically repeated in the State papers. The stand taken by the Advocate during the labor strikes and riots in Milwaukee, in 1881, is said to have saved the Democratic party in Wisconsin from making a serious mistake.

== Personal life ==
On July 12, 1854, Abbie C. Ballou married Charles D. Robinson (1822–1886), of Green Bay, Wisconsin. He was the founder and editor of the Green Bay Advocate and for many years one of the controlling minds of Wisconsin in all matters of public polity. He was at one time Secretary of State.

She died in 1893 and is buried at Oak Hill Cemetery, Woonsocket, Rhode Island.
