= Donald Tilleman =

American politician (1919–1972)

41st Mayor of Green Bay, Wisconsin
- In office 1965 – November 27, 1972
- Preceded by: Roman Denissen
- Succeeded by: Harris Burgoyne

Personal details
- Born: February 23, 1919
- Died: November 27, 1972 (aged 53); New York City, U.S.
- Cause of death: Heart attack
- Resting place: Allouez, Wisconsin, U.S.
- Spouse: Jane Steele (m. 1940)
- Children: 7
- Occupation: Politician

Donald Tilleman (February 23, 1919 – November 27, 1972) was an American politician who served as the 41st mayor of Green Bay, Wisconsin, from 1965 to 1972.

== Biography ==
Tilleman was born on February 23, 1919. He married Jane Steele of Reno, Nevada, in 1940. They had seven children. Tilleman died on November 27, 1972, from a heart attack in New York City while on city business. He is buried in Allouez, Wisconsin.

== Political career ==
Tilleman unsuccessfully ran for alderman before being elected in 1951. In 1963, he lost to Roman Denissen for mayor. Two years later, he defeated Denissen and served as mayor until his death. The Mason Street Bridge across the Fox River is named the Donald Tilleman Bridge in his honor, including a relief plaque with his face on the bridge keeper's house.
