= Alonzo Kimball =

19th century American politician

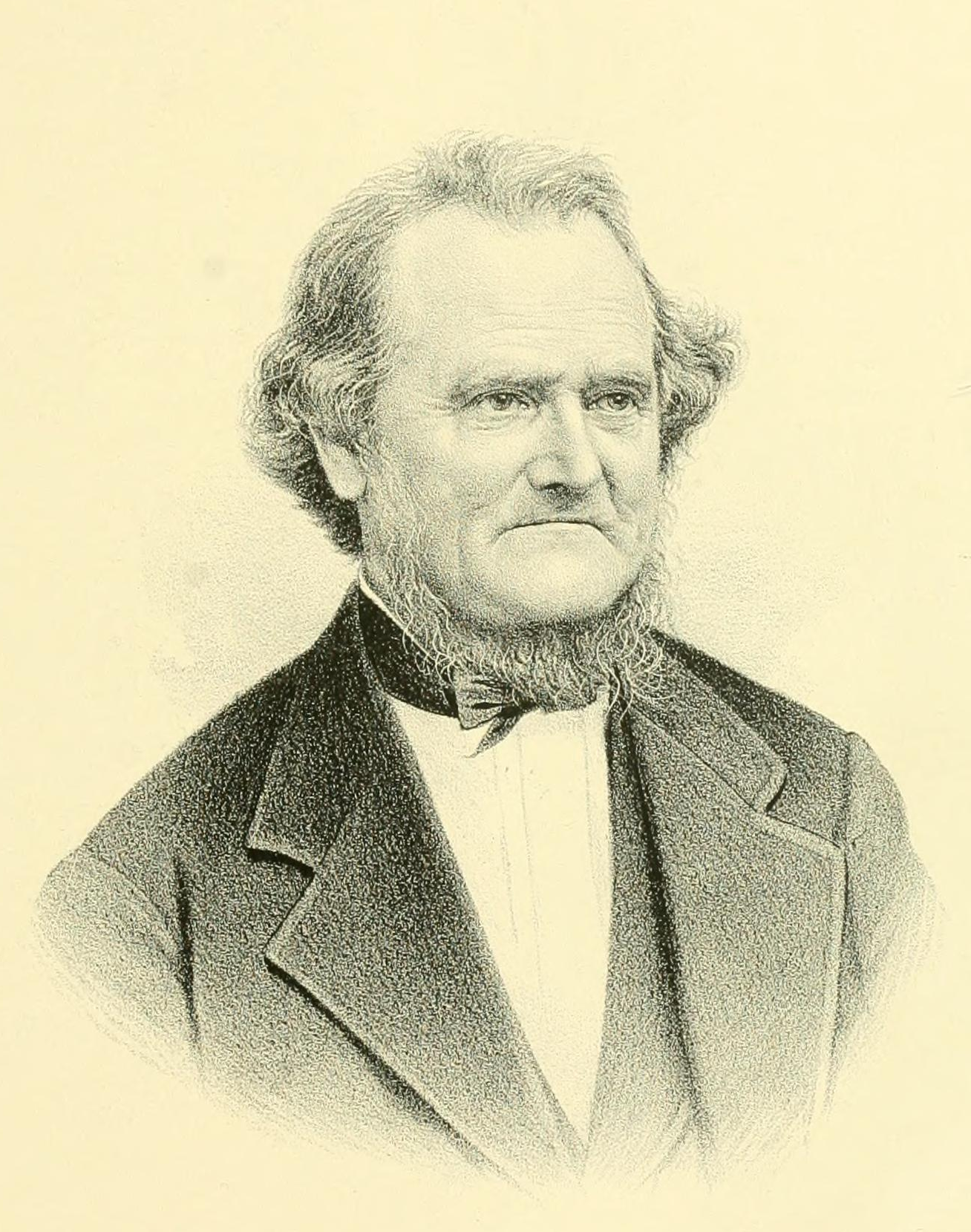
- From Commemorative Biographical Record of the Fox River Valley Counties of Brown, Outagamie and Winnebago (1895)

14th & 16th Mayor of Green Bay, Wisconsin
- In office April 1873 – April 1874
- Preceded by: Charles D. Robinson
- Succeeded by: C. E. Crane
- In office April 1871 – April 1872
- Preceded by: Anton Klaus
- Succeeded by: Charles D. Robinson

Personal details
- Born: November 29, 1808 Le Ray, New York, U.S.
- Died: August 7, 1900 (aged 91) Green Bay, Wisconsin, U.S.
- Resting place: Woodlawn Cemetery, Green Bay
- Party: Republican
- Spouse: Sarah Weston (m. 1840; died 1891)
- Children: Mary Cornelia (Walker)^{(b. 1842; died 1913)}; Alonzo Weston Kimball^{(b. 1844; died 1905)}; Charles Theodore Kimball^{(b. 1847; died 1914)}; Mather Dean Kimball^{(b. 1849; died 1910)}; William Dwight Kimball^{(b. 1852; died 1854)}; Sara W. (Hobbs)^{(b. 1857; died 1940)}
- Relatives: Alonzo Myron Kimball (grandson); Mary Bannister Willard (niece)
- Education: Union College; Andover Theological Seminary

Alonzo Kimball (November 29, 1808 – August 7, 1900) was an American educator, businessman, and Wisconsin pioneer. He was the 14th and 16th mayor of Green Bay, Wisconsin, and served as treasurer of the relief organization for the victims of the 1871 Peshtigo fire.

He is also the grandfather of American portrait painter and illustrator Alonzo Myron Kimball (1874–1923).

== Biography ==
Alonzo Kimball was born in the town of Le Ray, Jefferson County, New York, in November 1808. He was raised and educated on his father's farm in Le Ray until 1816, when his family moved to Leyden, New York. In the 1830s he attended Union College, graduating in 1836. After graduating, he attended Andover Theological Seminary, intent on following after his father into a church career; he was forced to abandon his studies in 1839 due to poor health.

Instead, Kimball began teaching school in Lee, Massachusetts. In 1847, he moved west to the Wisconsin Territory, settling briefly in Milwaukee. In 1849, he moved north to Green Bay, Wisconsin, where he resumed teaching. In 1852, he went into business dealing hardware, which became his primary occupation for the rest of his career.

Politically, Kimball was a member of the Republican Party since its creation in 1854, and was an avowed abolitionist. During the 1850s, Green Bay was a stop on the Underground Railroad; it is recorded that on at least one occasion Kimball personally helped hide and secure passage for a family who had escaped from slavery, on their way to Canada.

He was elected mayor of Green Bay, for two non-consecutive terms, in 1871 and 1873. While serving as mayor in 1871, the great Peshtigo fire struck northeast Wisconsin, burning more than a million acres and killing an estimated 1,500–2,500 people. Green Bay was the nearest large city to the destruction, and nearly all aide donations from around the country flowed through Green Bay to reach the victims. Mayor Kimball organized the city to manage the relief logistics; committees were organized from each city ward, and Turner Hall was transformed into a temporary hospital. When the Peshtigo Fire Relief Committee was formally established, Kimball was selected as treasurer of the organization.

In addition to his service as mayor, Kimball also served as a member of the city council and the local school board, and was appointed postmaster of Green Bay from 1877 to 1884.

== Personal life and family ==
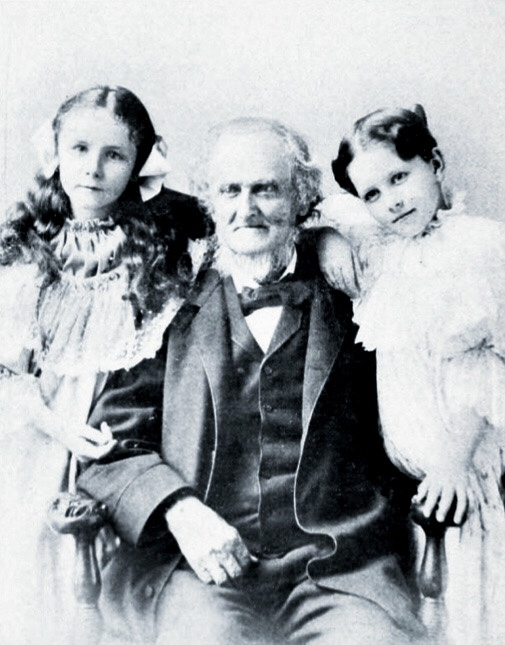
Alonzo Kimball with his granddaughters Alice Rule Sale (left) and Marjorie Weston Kimball, c. 1895

Alonzo Kimball was the fifth of twelve children born to Reverend Reuel (or Ruel; 1778–1847) and Hannah (née Mather; 1781–1860) Kimball. The Kimball family were descended from Richard Kimball, who emigrated to the Massachusetts Bay Colony from Ipswich, England, in 1634.

Alonzo's younger sister, Lucy, married Methodist theologian Henry M. Bannister. Their daughter, Mary Bannister Willard, became a leader in the Temperance movement. Henry M. Bannister was also the brother of Fond du Lac, Wisconsin, pioneer John Bannister.

On October 1, 1840, Alonzo Kimball married Sarah Weston (1811–1891) at Hudson, New York. Sarah Weston was the daughter of Reverend Isaiah Weston of Dalton, Massachusetts. They had six children together, and were married for 51 years before Sarah's death in 1891.

Through their son Alonzo Weston Kimball, they were also grandparents of the artist Alonzo Myron Kimball.

After a brief, sudden, illness, Alonzo Kimball died at age 91, on August 7, 1900, at the home of his son, Charles, in Green Bay. At the time of his death, he was the oldest living graduate of Union College. Kimball Street in Green Bay is named for him.

Political offices
Preceded by Anton Klaus	Mayor of Green Bay, Wisconsin; April 1871 – April 1872	Succeeded by Charles D. Robinson
Preceded by Charles D. Robinson	Mayor of Green Bay, Wisconsin; April 1873 – April 1874	Succeeded by C. E. Crane
