= Alexander T. Gray =

American politician

Alexander T. Gray, also called Alex T. Grey, was a politician from the U.S. state of Wisconsin. He served as that state's fourth Secretary of State for a single term from January 2, 1854, to January 7, 1856. He was a Democrat and served under Democratic governor William A. Barstow.

He resided in Janesville, Wisconsin, at the time of his election.

Political offices
Preceded by Charles Robinson	Secretary of State of Wisconsin; 1854–1856	Succeeded by David Jones
