= Otto Rachals =

American politician (1897–1984)

39th Mayor of Green Bay, Wisconsin
- In office 1955–1959
- Preceded by: Dominic Olejniczak
- Succeeded by: Roman Denissen

Personal details
- Born: January 1, 1897 Langlade County, Wisconsin, U.S.
- Died: July 7, 1984 (aged 87) Green Bay, Wisconsin, U.S.
- Party: Democratic
- Spouses: Gertrude Moore (m. 1925) Gail Meyer (m. 1956)
- Profession: Politician

Otto Rachals (January 1, 1897 – July 7, 1984) was an American politician who served as the 67th mayor of Green Bay, Wisconsin from 1955 to 1959.

== Early life and education ==
Rachals was born in Langlade County, Wisconsin, on January 1, 1897.

== Career ==
Rachals served as the 39th mayor of Green Bay, Wisconsin. He served two full terms as a Democrat.

Rachals ran for re-election to a third term in 1959. He was defeated by his successor, Roman Denissen, by a margin of 4,367 votes, receiving 6,599 votes to Denissen's 10,966.

== Personal life and death ==
Rachals married Gertrude Moore in 1925. He married Gail Meyer in Green Bay, Wisconsin, on August 4, 1956.

Rachals died at the age of 87 at Glenn Wood Nursing Center in Green Bay, Wisconsin.

Political offices
| Preceded by Dominic Olejniczak | 39th Mayor of Green Bay, Wisconsin; 1955–1959 | Succeeded by Roman Denissen |
