= Alex Biemeret =

American mayor

37th Mayor of Green Bay
- In office 1938–1945
- Preceded by: John S. Farrell
- Succeeded by: Dominic Olejniczak

Personal details
- Born: Alexander Biemeret; February 28, 1877 Green Bay, Wisconsin, U.S.
- Died: May 29, 1946 (aged 69) Green Bay, Wisconsin, U.S.

Alexander Biemeret (February 28, 1877 – May 29, 1946) was an American politician who served as the 37th mayor of Green Bay, Wisconsin, from 1938 to 1945.

== Biography ==
Biemeret was born on February 28, 1877, the son of Jean (John) Baptiste Biemeret (1851–1887) and Catherine Biemeret (née LaHaye, 1846–1884). His mother died when he was seven years old, and his father was fatally injured three years later in the Rahr Brewery explosion of August 3, 1887. Biemeret worked as a youth in Smth's garden and later as a clothing salesman in stores in Green Bay. Biemeret married Flora Antonneau (1876–1948). He died from myocardial infarction on May 29, 1946.

== Career ==
Prior to his time as mayor, Biemeret served as a Green Bay alderman and city councilman. He served as mayor from 1938 to 1945.
