= John S. Farrell =

American politician (1880–1938)

36th Mayor of Green Bay, Wisconsin
- In office 1937 – March 15, 1938
- Preceded by: John V. Diener
- Succeeded by: Alex Biemeret

Personal details
- Born: May 4, 1880 Fort Howard, Green Bay, Wisconsin, U.S.
- Died: March 15, 1938 (aged 57) Green Bay, Wisconsin, U.S.
- Cause of death: Suicide by shotgun
- Party: Republican
- Parent(s): Richard Farrell; Margaret Maher Farrell
- Profession: Politician

John S. Farrell (May 4, 1880 – March 15, 1938) was an American politician. He served as the 36th mayor of Green Bay, Wisconsin, holding office from 1937 to 1938.

== Biography ==
Farrell was born on May 4, 1880. He died on March 15, 1938, from apparent suicide by shotgun.

== Career ==
Farrell served as an alderman and city councilman from 1905 to 1915. In 1923, he was appointed postmaster of Green Bay by U.S. President Warren G. Harding. He was later re-appointed by Presidents Calvin Coolidge and Herbert Hoover, serving until 1936. That year he ran as a Republican for election to the United States House of Representatives from Wisconsin's 8th congressional district. He ultimately finished third in the election, with incumbent George J. Schneider winning the seat. The following year he was elected mayor of Green Bay, serving until his death.

== See also ==
- The Political Graveyard
