= Arthur C. Neville =

American lawyer, historian, and politician (1850–1929)

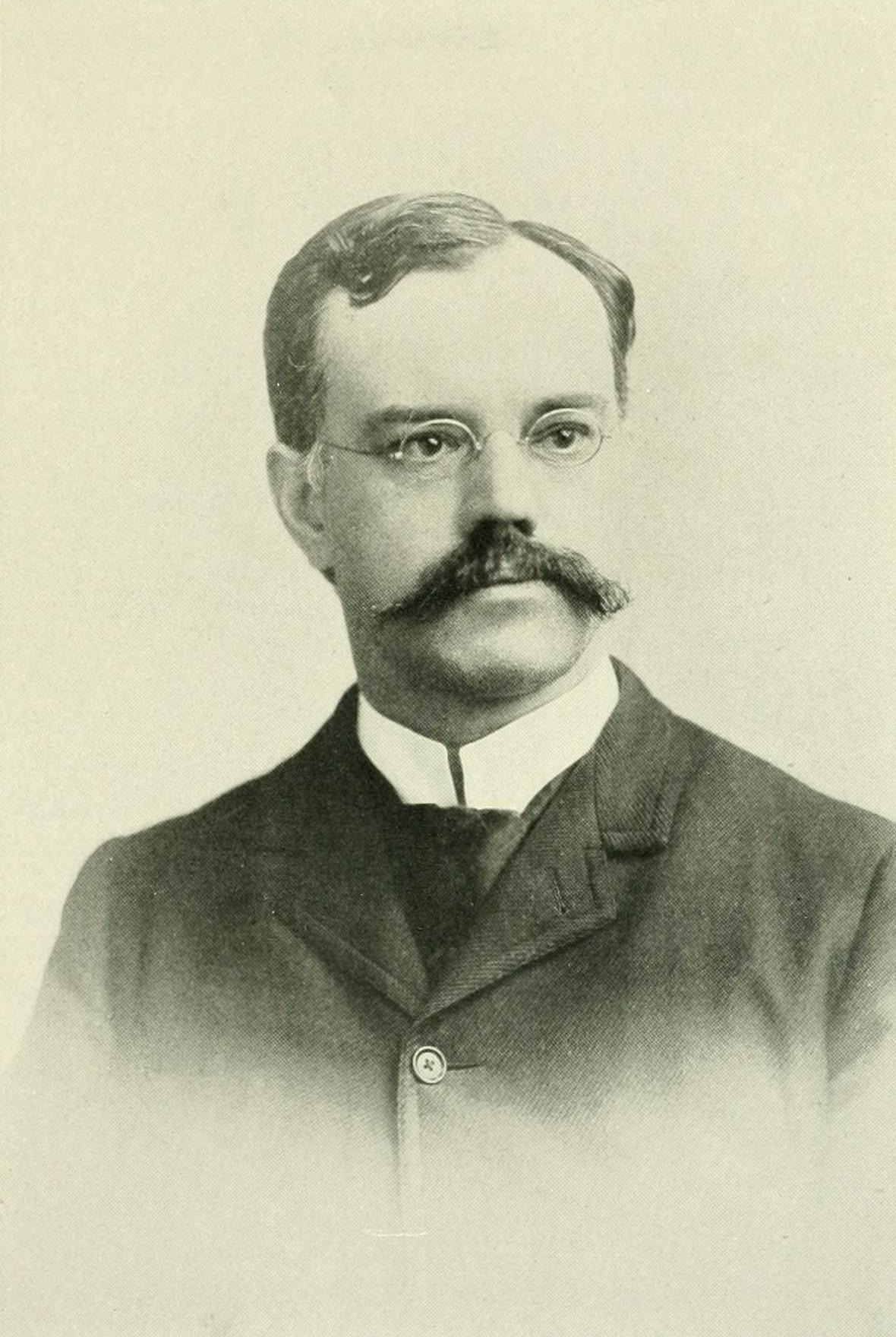

25th Mayor of Green Bay, Wisconsin
- In office April 1888 – April 1890
- Preceded by: Charles Hartung
- Succeeded by: James H. Elmore

Personal details
- Born: Arthur Courtenay Neville; October 13, 1850 Pottsville, Pennsylvania, U.S.
- Died: May 20, 1929 (aged 78) Green Bay, Wisconsin, U.S.
- Cause of death: Heart attack
- Resting place: Woodlawn Cemetery, Green Bay, Wisconsin
- Party: Democratic
- Spouses: Harriet Augusta Reynolds (m. 1874; died 1874); Ella Peak (m. 1881–1929)
- Children: Marion Van Buren (Mason) (stepdaughter); (b. 1874; died 1929)
- Parent: John C. Neville (father)
- Education: read law
- Profession: lawyer

Arthur Courtenay Neville (October 13, 1850 – May 20, 1929) was an American lawyer and historian, and was the 25th Mayor of Green Bay, Wisconsin. He is the namesake of Neville Public Museum of Brown County in Green Bay.

== Education and career ==
Neville was born in 1850 at Pottsville, Pennsylvania, and moved as a young child with his parents to Green Bay, Wisconsin, in 1856. He received his early education from a governess and later attended the public schools at Green Bay until age 17. He went to work as a clerk and messenger for the firm of Dousman & Elmore, and was then employed as a bookkeeper for the Chicago lumber firm Carter & Jones until 1869. He worked from 1869 to 1871 as an assistant bookkeeper for the wholesale grocer Sprague, Warner & Company.

In 1871, he returned to Green Bay as bookkeeper for the Commercial National Bank. The next year, he went to work in his father's law offices of Neville & Tracy, reading law there for the next three years until his admission to the State Bar of Wisconsin at the Wisconsin circuit court in 1874.

Neville worked for several years as a practicing attorney, and became a prominent member of the Democratic Party in Green Bay. In 1888 he was elected Mayor of Green Bay on the Democratic "Peoples'" ticket, defeating incumbent mayor Charles Hartung. He was reelected in an 1889 rematch with Hartung, but by a smaller margin.

After his terms as mayor, he focused on his interest in history and was one of the founders of the Green Bay Historical Society and the Brown County Historical Society. He was also a curator of the Wisconsin Historical Society.

Later, he was one of the organizers of the Green Bay Water Company, and was a co-founder and president of the Kendall Manufacturing Company, later known as the Green Bay Planing Mill.

== Personal life, family, and legacy ==
Neville was one of six children born to John C. Neville and his wife Catherine Neville (née Lawton). John Neville was an Irish American immigrant and lawyer and became the 20th mayor of Green Bay, district attorney of Brown County, Wisconsin, and a one-time member of the Wisconsin State Assembly. Catherine was a descendant of a 17th century English settler at Massachusetts Bay Colony.

Arthur Neville married twice. His first wife, Harriet Reynolds, died only a few months after they married in 1874. He later married Ella Peak (née Hoes), a great niece of former U.S. President Martin Van Buren. Neville had no children of his own, but Ella had one daughter from her previous marriage.

Neville was a member of the Knights of Pythias, the Benevolent and Protective Order of Elks, and the Episcopal church. He died at his home in Green Bay after a heart attack in 1929. He had suffered several heart attacks over the last few months of his life.

In 1923, Neville's step-daughter and her husband, George Grant Mason, made a $60,000 donation to Green Bay to build a museum named for Mr. and Mrs. Arthur Neville, to honor their "work towards civic betterment in Green Bay." The museum opened in 1927 and is still known as the Neville Public Museum of Brown County, although it is no longer housed in the original building.

== Electoral history ==
Green Bay Mayoral Election, 1888
Party	Candidate	Votes	%	±%
General Election, April 3, 1888
Democratic	Arthur C. Neville	805	62.61%	
Republican	Charles Hartung (incumbent)	422	34.39%	
Plurality		383	31.21%	
Total votes		1,227	100.0%	+30.53%
Democratic gain from Republican				

Green Bay Mayoral Election, 1889
Party	Candidate	Votes	%	±%
General Election, April 2, 1889
Democratic	Arthur C. Neville (incumbent)	683	54.55%	−11.05%
Republican	Charles Hartung	569	45.45%	
Plurality		114	9.11%	-22.11%
Total votes		1,252	100.0%	+2.04%
Democratic hold				

Political offices
Preceded by Charles Hartung	Mayor of Green Bay, Wisconsin; April 1888 – April 1890	Succeeded by James H. Elmore
