= Thomas Atkinson (Wisconsin politician) =

American politician (1928–1988)

43rd Mayor of Green Bay, Wisconsin
- In office 1973–1975
- Preceded by: Harris Burgoyne
- Succeeded by: Michael Monfils

Personal details
- Born: March 9, 1928
- Died: June 10, 1988 (aged 60)
- Cause of death: Cancer
- Spouse: Patricia Liebergen
- Children: 6
- Education: University of Nevada, Reno
- Occupation: Politician

Military service
- Allegiance: United States
- Branch/service: United States Navy
- Battles/wars: World War II

Thomas Atkinson (March 9, 1928 – June 10, 1988) was an American politician who served as the 43rd mayor of Green Bay, Wisconsin, from 1973 to 1975.

== Biography ==
Atkinson was born on March 9, 1928, to Henry Atkinson (1899–1960) and Evelyn Atkinson (née Piron, 1902–1993) in Green Bay. He served in the United States Navy during World War II and attended the University of Nevada, Reno. Atkinson married Patricia Liebergen and had six children. He died from cancer on June 10, 1988.

== Political career ==
After serving as an alderman and supervisor, Atkinson became mayor in 1973 and held office until 1975. He also ran unsuccessfully for mayor in 1979 and 1987.
