= John V. Diener =

American politician (1887–1937)

35th Mayor of Green Bay, Wisconsin
- In office 1929–1937
- Preceded by: James H. McGillan
- Succeeded by: John S. Farrell

Personal details
- Born: John Vernon Diener; January 23, 1887 Baraboo, Wisconsin, U.S.
- Died: May 29, 1937 (aged 50)
- Party: Democratic
- Spouse: Margaret Wigman (m. 1914)
- Children: 6
- Education: Notre Dame Law School
- Occupation: Politician

Military service
- Allegiance: United States
- Branch/service: United States Army
- Rank: Officer
- Unit: 30th Infantry Division (119th Infantry Regiment)
- Battles/wars: World War I

John Vernon Diener (January 23, 1887 – May 29, 1937) was an American politician who served as the 35th mayor of Green Bay, Wisconsin, from 1929 to 1937.

== Biography ==
Diener was born in Baraboo, Wisconsin, in 1887. He graduated from Notre Dame Law School before moving to Green Bay. Diener later practiced law with future U.S. Representative Thomas F. Konop. In 1914, Diener married Margaret Wigman. They had six children. During World War I, he served as an officer in the United States Army with the 119th Infantry Regiment of the 30th Infantry Division. Diener died in 1937.

== Political career ==
Diener was mayor from 1929 to 1937. Previously, he was an unsuccessful candidate for district attorney of Brown County, Wisconsin. He was a Democrat.
