= J. H. M. Wigman =

American politician (1835–1920)

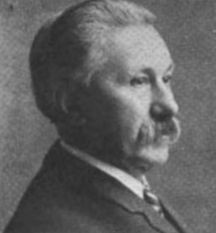
- J. H. M. Wigman

22nd Mayor of Green Bay, Wisconsin
- In office 1882–1883
- Preceded by: William J. Abrams
- Succeeded by: William J. Abrams

Personal details
- Born: John Henry Mary Wigman; August 15, 1835 Amsterdam, Netherlands
- Died: January 31, 1920 (aged 84)
- Cause of death: Diabetes
- Spouse(s): Matilda Lyannoise (m. 1856) Jennie Meagher
- Children: 7
- Occupation: Politician, lawyer

John Henry Mary Wigman (August 15, 1835 – January 31, 1920) was an American politician and lawyer who served as the 22nd mayor of Green Bay, Wisconsin, from 1882 to 1883.

== Biography ==
Wigman was born on August 15, 1835, in Amsterdam, Netherlands. He moved to the United States with his brother when he was thirteen years old. They settled in Little Chute, Wisconsin, before moving to Bay Settlement, Wisconsin. Wigman married Matilda Lyannoise in 1856 and the couple moved to Appleton, Wisconsin. They would have seven children. After Matilda's passing, he married Jennie Meagher. Wigman moved to Green Bay in 1870. He died from diabetes mellitus on January 31, 1920.

== Career ==
Wigman was a lawyer, practicing law in Appleton and Green Bay. He served as mayor in 1882. He was the United States Attorney for the Eastern District of Wisconsin from 1893-1897.
