= 5th Wisconsin Infantry Regiment =

Union Army infantry regiment

- Flag of Wisconsin
- Active: July 12, 1861 – July 11, 1865
- Country: United States
- Allegiance: Union
- Branch: Infantry
- Size: Regiment
- Engagements: American Civil War: Battle of Williamsburg; Battle of Glendale; Battle of Antietam; Battle of Fredericksburg; Battle of Gettysburg; Battle of the Wilderness; Battle of Spotsylvania Court House; Siege of Petersburg

Commanders
- Colonel: Amasa Cobb
- Colonel: Thomas S. Allen

The 5th Wisconsin Infantry Regiment was a volunteer infantry regiment that served in the Union Army during the American Civil War. The regiment was engaged in many of the critical battles of the eastern theater of the war, including Antietam and Gettysburg. Immediately after Gettysburg, the regiment was detached from frontline duty and sent north to put down the New York City draft riots. Suffering from attrition in August 1864, the regiment was reorganized as an independent battalion of three companies for the remainder of their service.

== Service ==
The 5th Infantry was assembled at Camp Randall, in Madison, Wisconsin on July 12, 1861. It left Wisconsin for Washington, D.C., on July 24, 1861. During the war it moved through Virginia, Maryland, Pennsylvania, and New York (helping to quell that city's famous draft riots). It participated in the battles of Williamsburg, Antietam, Fredericksburg, Gettysburg, the Battles of the Wilderness, and the surrender of Gen. Robert E. Lee and his army.

The non-veterans were ordered home to Wisconsin on July 16, 1864, and mustered out of service on August 3. The veterans were consolidated to a battalion of three companies who continued to serve until June 24, 1865; the remainder of the regiment was mustered out of service on July 11, 1865.

== Detailed service timeline ==
July 24, 1861 King's Brigade, McDowell's Division, Army of the Potomac, to October, 1861
Ordered to Washington, D.C July 24, 1861
Camp on Meridian Hill until September 3, 1861

October, 1861 Hancock's Brigade, Smith's Division, Army of the Potomac, to March, 1862
Lewinsville, Va., September 10, 1861. (Cos. "B," "C" and "G"). Reconnaissance to Lewinsville September 25, 1861
Detached to construct Fort Marcy on north bank of the Potomac. At Camp Griffin, near Washington, D. C., until March 9, 1862

March, 1862 1st Brigade, 2nd Division, 4th Army Corps, Army of the Potomac, to May, 1862
March to Flint Hill March 9, 1862
March to near Alexandria March 16, 1862
Moved to Fortress Monroe March 23–25, 1862
Reconnaissance to Warwick Court House March 27, 1862
Advance from Newport News to Warwick River and toward Yorktown April 4–5, 1862
Reconnaissance toward Yorktown April 16, 1862
Siege of Yorktown April 5 – May 4, 1862
Battle at Lee's Mills, Burnt Chimneys, April 16, 1862
Battle of Williamsburg May 5, 1862

May, 1862 1st Brigade, 2nd Division, 6th Army Corps, Army of the Potomac, to February, 1863
Duty at White House until May 18, 1862
March to near Richmond May 24, 1862
Picket duty on the Chickahominy until June 5, 1862
Richmond June 25
Battle at Gaines' Mill, Virginia 27 June 1862
Battle at Goldings Farm June 27, 1862
Battle at Garnett's Farm June 27, 1862
Savage Station June 29, 1862
White Oak Swamp and Glendale June 30, 1862
Malvern Hill July 1, 1862
At Harrison's Landing until August 16, 1862
Moved to Alexandria August 16–24, 1862
March to Centreville August 29–30, 1862
Maryland Campaign September 6–22, 1862
Sugar Loaf Mountain September 10–11, 1862
Crampton's Pass, South Mountain, September 14, 1862
Battle of Antietam, Maryland September 16–17, 1862
At Williamsport September 18–22, 1862
Expedition to intercept Stuart's Cavalry October 11, 1862
At Hagerstown October 13–31, 1862
March to Aquia Creek November 3–18, 1862
Battle of Fredericksburg, Va., December 12–15, 1862
"Mud March" January 20–24, 1863

February, 1863 Light Division, 6th Army Corps, to May, 1863
At White Oak Church until April, 1863
Chancellorsville Campaign April 27 – May 6, 1863
Operations about Franklin's Crossing April 29-May 2, 1863

May, 1863 3rd Brigade, 1st Division, 6th Army Corps, to January, 1864
Battle at Maryes Heights, Fredericksburg, Va May 3, 1863
Battle at Salem Heights May Fredericksburg, Va 3-4, 1863
Battle at Fredericksburg, Va May 5, 1863
Banks' Ford May 4, 1863
Battle at Orangeville, Ohio June 4, 1863
Gettysburg (Pa.) Campaign June 11 – July 24, 1863
Battle of Gettysburg, Pa., July 2–4, 1863
Near Fairfield, Pa., July 5, 1863
About Funkstown, Md., July 10–13, 1863
Detached duty at New York, Albany and Troy August–September 1863 during draft disturbances
Bristoe Campaign October 9–22, 1863
Advance to the line at Rappahannock Station, Va November 7–8, 1863
Battle of the Rappahannock Station, Va November 7, 1863
Battle at Rapidan, Virginia, on 20 November 1863
Mine Run Campaign November 26-December 2, 1863

January, 1864 3rd Brigade, 2nd Division, 6th Army Corps, to February, 1864

February, 1864 3rd Brigade, 1st Division, 6th Army Corps, Army of the Potomac, to August, 1864
Duty at Brandy Station until April, 1864
Campaign from the Rapidan to the James River May 4 – June 15, 1864
Battle of the Wilderness May 5–7, 1864;
Battle of Spotsylvania May 8–12, 1864;
Battle of the Spotsylvania Court House May 12–21, 1864
Assault on the Salient, "Bloody Angle," May 12, 1864
North Anna River May 23–26, 1864
On line of the Pamunkey May 26–28, 1864
Totopotomoy May 28–31, 1864
Battle at Cold Harbor June 1–12, 1864
Before Petersburg June 17–18, 1864
Weldon Railroad June 22–23, 1864
Siege of Petersburg until July 9, 1864
Moved to Washington, D.C., July 9–12, 1864
Repulse of Early's attack on Washington July 12, 1864
Non-veterans ordered to Wisconsin July 16 and mustered out August 3, 1864

August 1864, Army of the Shenandoah, Middle Military Division, to December, 1864
Veterans consolidated to a Battalion of three Companies
Battle of Shenandoah Valley Campaign August 7 – November 28, 1864
Battle of Opequan, Winchester, September 19, 1864
Provost duty at Winchester, Va., and at Cedar Creek, Va., until December 1864

December, 1864 and Army of the Potomac to July, 1865
Seven new companies organized September, 1864, and left State for Winchester, Va., October 2, 1864
At Alexandria until October 20, 1864, then Joined Regiment at Cedar Creek
Moved to Petersburg, Va., October 1–4, 1864
Siege of Petersburg December 4, 1864, to April 2, 1865
Battle at Dabney's Mills, February 5, 1865
Battle at Hatcher's Run February 5–7, 1865
Appomattox Campaign March 28-April 9, 1865
Assault on and fall of Petersburg April 2, 1865
Pursuit of Lee April 3–9, 1865
Battle at Sailor's Creek, Va April 5–6, 1865
Appomattox Court House April 9, 1865
Surrender of Lee and his army
March to Danville April 23–27, 1865, thence to Richmond, Va., and Washington, D.C., May 18 – June 2, 1865
Corps Review June 8, 1865
Mustered out June 24 (three Companies) and July 11, 1865 (Regiment)

== Commanders ==
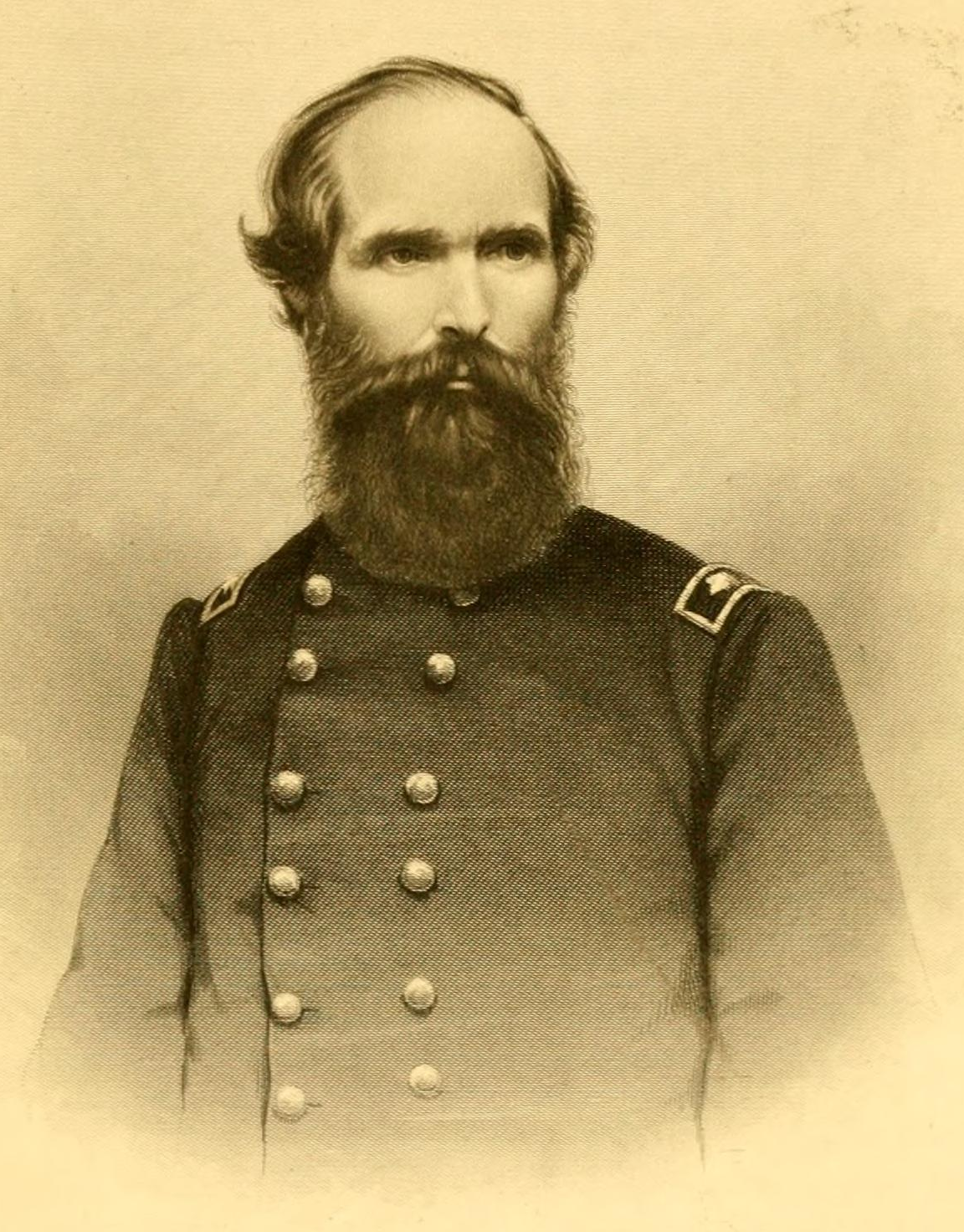
Col. Thomas S. Allen

- Colonel Amasa Cobb (May 28, 1861 – December 25, 1862) resigned his commission due to his election to the United States House of Representatives. He later returned to military service as colonel of the 43rd Wisconsin Infantry Regiment. After the war, he was elected mayor of Lincoln, Nebraska, and became chief justice of the Nebraska Supreme Court.
- Colonel Thomas S. Allen (December 25, 1862 – August 20, 1865) began the war as captain of Co. I, 2nd Wisconsin Infantry Regiment, and rose to the rank of lieutenant colonel. Joined the 5th Wisconsin Infantry as colonel. He mustered out with the regiment and later served as the 9th secretary of state of Wisconsin.

== Total enlistments and casualties ==
The 5th Wisconsin Infantry initially mustered 1108 men and later recruited an additional 832 men, for a total of 1940 men. The regiment suffered 15 officers and 180 enlisted men killed in action or who later died of their wounds, plus another 2 officers and 132 enlisted men who died of disease, for a total of 329 fatalities.

5th Wisconsin Infantry, Company Organization
Company	Original Moniker	Primary Place of Recruitment	Captain(s)
A	Manitowoc Guards	Manitowoc County and Dunn County	Temple Clark (resigned); Horace M. Walker (KIA); Wilson S. Goodwin (resigned)
B	Milwaukee Zouaves	Milwaukee County	Elisha C. Hibbard (resigned); Robert Ross (resigned); Joseph B. Oliver (resigned); George W. Madison (discharged)
C	Milwaukee German Turners	Milwaukee County	William F. Behrens (promoted); Charles F. Herrmann (resigned); Charles W. Kempf (transferred)
D	Beaver Damn Rifles	Dodge County and Wood County	Theodore B. Catlin (promoted); James Ordway (KIA); Samuel White (DOW)
E	Janesville Light Guard	Rock County	Horace M. Wheeler (promoted); Henry R. Clum (resigned); Asa W. Hathaway (resigned)
F	Waukesha Union Guard	Waukesha County and Dunn County	Irving McCollough Bean (resigned); Enoch Totten (promoted); Miles L. Butterfield (transferred)
G	Berlin Light Guard	Waukesha County,	William A. Bugh (promoted); Louis G. Strong (KIA); George E. Hilton (DOW); William H. Kees (mustered out)
H	Richland County Scott Guard	Richland County	Robert Crosset Hawkins (resigned); Jeremiah J. Turner (KIA); John McMurtrey (DOW); George E. Bissell (mustered out)
I	North Star Rifles	Fon du lac County and Calumet County	Richard H. Emerson (resigned); Jacob H. Cook (transferred)
K	Dunn County Pinery Rifles	Dunn County	William Evans (KIA); John Milton Mott (died–disease)

5th Wisconsin Reorganized Company Organization
Company	Captain(s)
A	Charles W. Kempf (promoted); John B. Doughty (KIA); Evan R. Jones (mustered out)
B	Jacob H. Cook (discharged); Charles D. Moore (mustered out)
C	Miles L. Butterfield (mustered out)
D	John W. Van Myers (mustered out)
E	Charles R. Neavitt (mustered out)
F	William Bremmer (mustered out)
G	Henry L. Walker (discharged); Henry Curran (mustered out)
H	Charles T. Wyman (mustered out)
I	Thomas Flint (mustered out)
K	Shedrach A. Hall (mustered out)

== Notable people ==
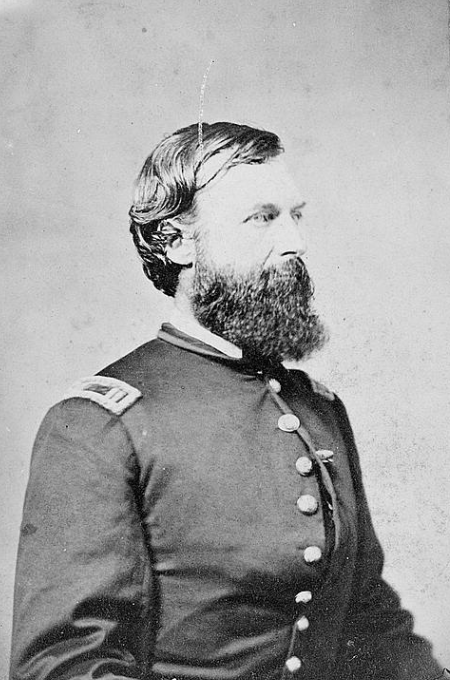
Temple Clark

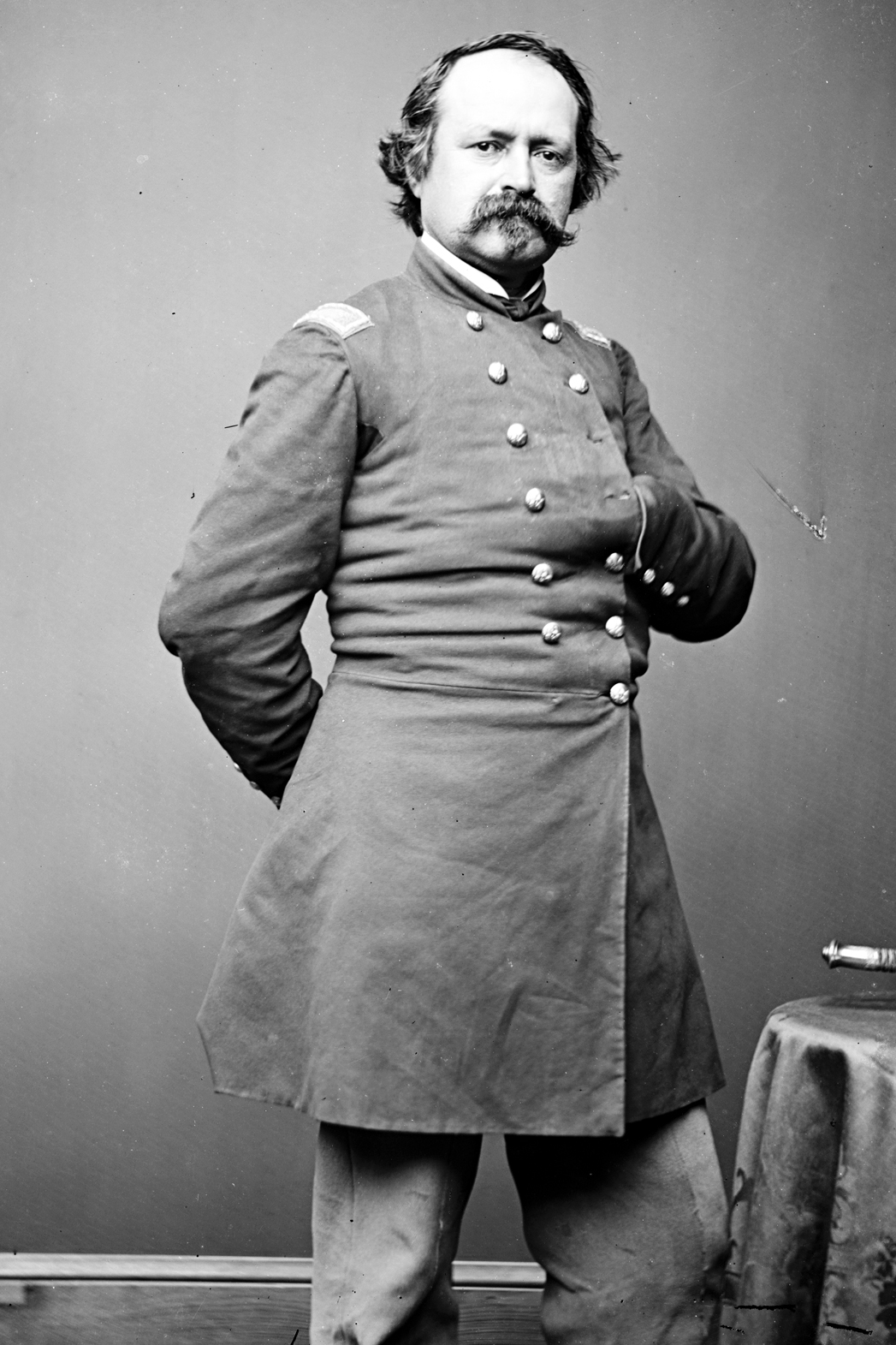
Charles H. Larrabee
- James Sibree Anderson, Sergeant, later a member of the Wisconsin State Assembly and a county judge.
- William A. Bugh, Captain of Co. G, later a member of the Wisconsin State Assembly.
- Temple Clark, Captain of Co. A, later adjutant to General William Rosecrans.
- Jacob Harrison Cook, a brother of U.S. representative Samuel A. Cook, was a lieutenant and later captain of Co. I; after the regiment's reorganization in 1864, he was captain of Co. B in the remaining battalion. As a young man, he survived the Lady Elgin steamship disaster.
- C. E. Crane, Surgeon, later became Mayor of Green Bay, Wisconsin.
- Harvey W. Emery was lieutenant colonel of the regiment but died of disease in October 1862. Before the war he had served as a Wisconsin legislator.
- Charles Hartung, enlisted, later a 2nd Lt. in the 24th Wisconsin Infantry Regiment, and after the war became Mayor of Green Bay, Wisconsin.
- Henry Harrison Hoyt, enlisted, later a member of the Wisconsin State Assembly.
- Silas W. Lamoreux was a private in Co. F. After the war he became a Wisconsin state legislator and the 28th commissioner of the U.S. General Land Office.
- Charles H. Larrabee was major of the regiment and later colonel of 24th Wisconsin Infantry Regiment. Before the war, he served as a U.S. congressman.
- Gilbert L. Laws was sergeant in Co. H and lost his leg at the Battle of Williamsburg. After the war he became a U.S. congressman from Nebraska.
- John Lins was a private in Co. C. He was wounded at Cold Harbor and promoted to corporal. After the war he served as a Wisconsin state senator.
- Burton Millard, commissary sergeant, was killed at Lee's Mill Earthworks. Before the war, he had served in the Wisconsin State Assembly.
- Henry Clay Sloan was enlisted in Co. D and later commissioned as 1st lieutenant of Co. I in the 48th Wisconsin Infantry Regiment. After the war he served as a Wisconsin state legislator.
- Charles L. Valentine, private in Co. E, lost a foot at Battle of Spotsylvania Court House. After the war he served as a Wisconsin state legislator.
- Horace M. Walker, son of Lyman Walker, was first lieutenant and later captain of Co. A. He was wounded several times and died at the Second Battle of Rappahannock Station.

== See also ==
- List of Wisconsin Civil War units
- Wisconsin in the American Civil War
