= Frederick S. Ellis =

American politician (1830–1879)

18th Mayor of Green Bay, Wisconsin
- In office April 1876 – April 1877
- Preceded by: C. E. Crane
- Succeeded by: C. E. Crane

Chairman of the Board of Supervisors of Brown County, Wisconsin
- In office April 1870 – April 1876
- Preceded by: Henry S. Baird
- Succeeded by: John Last

Member of the Wisconsin Senate from the 2nd district
- In office January 1, 1864 – January 1, 1866
- Preceded by: Edward Hicks
- Succeeded by: Matthew J. Meade

Member of the Wisconsin State Assembly from the Brown district
- In office January 1, 1861 – January 1, 1864
- Preceded by: John C. Neville
- Succeeded by: William J. Abrams

Personal details
- Born: Fredrick Seymour Ellis; January 17, 1830 Brown County, Michigan Territory, U.S.
- Died: June 6, 1879 (aged 49) Green Bay, Wisconsin, U.S.
- Cause of death: Pneumonia
- Resting place: Woodlawn Cemetery, Green Bay, Wisconsin, U.S.
- Party: Democratic
- Spouse: Lydia Whitney (m. 1868–1879)
- Children: 4
- Parent: Albert Gallatin Ellis (father)
- Relatives: Eleazor H. Ellis (brother)

Fredrick Seymour Ellis (January 17, 1830 – June 6, 1879) was an American surveyor, insurance agent, and politician. He was the 18th Mayor of Green Bay, Wisconsin, and, as a member of the Democratic Party, he represented Brown County in the Wisconsin State Senate (1864–1866) and Assembly (1861–1864). He was the son of Wisconsin pioneer Albert Gallatin Ellis and brother of Wisconsin judge Eleazor H. Ellis.

== Early life and career ==
Ellis was born January 17, 1830, in what is now Allouez, Wisconsin. At the time, it was unorganized land of Brown County outside the frontier town of Green Bay, which was then part of the Michigan Territory. His father, Albert Gallatin Ellis, was one of the first American settlers at Green Bay. He trained as a surveyor and worked as an assistant to his father, who was surveyor general of the Wisconsin Territory. He then partnered with his brother, Eleazor H. Ellis, in a land agency and mortgage lending business.

Ellis helped raise a company of volunteers known as the Green Bay Guards for service in the American Civil War. Though Ellis was initially elected their captain, he did not end up entering the service. The Green Bay Guards became part of the 4th Wisconsin Infantry Regiment.

== Political career ==
Ellis was elected to the Wisconsin State Assembly in 1860, and was the first member of the Assembly who had been born in the territory of Wisconsin. He was reelected in 1861 and 1862. In 1863, he was elected to a two-year term in the Wisconsin State Senate.

After serving six years as chairman of the Brown County Board of Supervisors, Ellis was mayor of Green Bay in 1876. After his term as mayor, he was elected treasurer of Brown County. In this role, he ran into scandal when the county went into debt. Ellis attempted to repair the debt by selling off his own possessions, and cashing in a $2,000 insurance policy, but his friends in the community offered to assist in covering the balance.

== Personal life and family ==
Frederick Ellis was the third son of Albert Gallatin Ellis and his first wife, Pamela Ellis (née Holmes). Albert G. Ellis initially came to Green Bay in 1821 as an Episcopalian missionary and teacher; he became surveyor general for the Wisconsin Territory, he served in the Territorial Legislature for several years, and was Mayor of Stevens Point, Wisconsin, for 7 of the first 15 years after the city's establishment. Frederick's brother, Eleazor H. Ellis, was the 6th Mayor of Green Bay, and in the 1870s became a Wisconsin circuit court judge.

Frederick Ellis married Lydia Whitney in 1868. Together, they had four children.

Frederick Ellis died at his home in Green Bay on June 6, 1879, after several weeks of pleurisy and pneumonia.

Wisconsin State Assembly
Preceded by John C. Neville	Member of the Wisconsin State Assembly from the Brown district January 1, 1861 – January 1, 1864	Succeeded by William J. Abrams
Wisconsin Senate
Preceded by Edward Hicks	Member of the Wisconsin Senate from the 2nd district January 1, 1864 – January 1, 1866	Succeeded by Matthew J. Meade
Political offices
Preceded by C. E. Crane	Mayor of Green Bay, Wisconsin; April 1876 – April 1877	Succeeded by C. E. Crane
