= James H. Elmore =

American politician (1843–1914)

26th Mayor of Green Bay, Wisconsin
- In office 1890–1895
- Preceded by: Arthur C. Neville
- Succeeded by: Frank B. Desnoyers

Personal details
- Born: James Henry Elmore; January 6, 1843 Mukwonago, Wisconsin, U.S.
- Died: June 1, 1914 (aged 71)
- Party: Democratic
- Spouse: Anna Leola Chapman
- Children: 1
- Education: Racine College
- Occupation: Politician

James Henry Elmore (January 6, 1843 – June 1, 1914) was an American politician who served as the 26th mayor of Green Bay, Wisconsin, from 1890 to 1895.

== Biography ==
Elmore was born James Henry Elmore on January 6, 1843, in Mukwonago, Wisconsin. He attended Racine College and first moved to Green Bay in 1863. After spending a number of years traveling, he settled in Fort Howard, Wisconsin, before returning to Green Bay in 1883. He married Anna Leola Chapman, and they had one son. Elmore died in 1914.

== Career ==
Elmore served as an alderman in and mayor of Fort Howard. He later served as mayor of Green Bay from 1890 to 1895. Elmore was a Democrat.
