= Roman Denissen =

American politician (1918–2008)

40th Mayor of Green Bay, Wisconsin
- In office 1959–1965
- Preceded by: Otto Rachals
- Succeeded by: Donald Tilleman

Personal details
- Born: July 13, 1918; Bellevue, Wisconsin, U.S.
- Died: January 21, 2008 (aged 89)
- Spouse(s): Ursula Carmody (m. 1939; died 1983) Agnes LeClair (m. 1984; died 2003)
- Children: 1
- Parent: Matt (father)
- Occupation: Politician

Roman Denissen (July 13, 1918 – January 21, 2008) was an American politician who served as the 40th mayor of Green Bay, Wisconsin, from 1959 to 1965.

== Biography ==
Denissen was born on July 13, 1918, in Bellevue, Wisconsin. His father, Matt, was Supervisor of Bellevue. Denissen married Ursula Carmody in 1939. They had one son before her death in 1983. In 1984, he married Agnes (Johnson) Le Clair. She died in 2003. Denissen died on January 21, 2008. He was Roman Catholic and a member of the Knights of Columbus.

== Political career ==
Denissen was elected to the City Council of Green Bay in 1952. He was named President of the Council in 1955. He ran unsuccessfully for Mayor against Otto Rachals in 1957. Two years later, he ran against Rachals again, this time winning. He served as Mayor until 1965, when he was defeated for re-election by Donald Tilleman.

== See also ==
- The Political Graveyard
