= Wisconsin's Brown–Door–Kewaunee Assembly district =

Former American legislative district

Wisconsin's Brown–Door–Kewaunee State Assembly district
- Obsolete
- Notes: 1852–1855

Wisconsin's Brown–Door–Kewaunee Assembly district was a district in the Wisconsin State Assembly in the early years of the history of the state of Wisconsin, prior to the legislative redistricting reforms of 1972 which created the current numbered districts. Located in northeast Wisconsin, the district comprised all of Brown, Door, and Kewaunee counties.

The district was in use for elections from 1852 through 1855 (inclusive).

== List of representatives ==
List of representatives from the Brown–Door–Kewaunee district
Member	Party	Residence	Term start	Term end	Leg.
District preceded by the Brown County district District created by 1852 Wisconsin Act 499
Randall Wilcox	Dem.	De Pere	January 3, 1853	January 2, 1854	6th
Francis X. Desnoyers	Whig	Green Bay	January 2, 1854	January 1, 1855	7th
Morgan Lewis Martin	Ind.	Green Bay	January 1, 1855	January 7, 1856	8th
John Day	Dem.	Green Bay	January 7, 1856	January 5, 1857	9th
District abolished by 1856 Wisconsin Act 109; Brown County returned to a single-county Assembly district Kewaunee and Door counties became part of the Door–Kewaunee–Oconto–Shawano district
