= James S. Marshall =

American businessman and politician, 11th Mayor of Green Bay, Wisconsin

11th Mayor of Green Bay, Wisconsin
- In office April 1867 – April 1868
- Preceded by: Charles D. Robinson
- Succeeded by: Anton Klaus

Personal details
- Born: March 22, 1819 Poultney, Vermont
- Died: April 2, 1892 (aged 73) Green Bay, Wisconsin
- Resting place: Woodlawn Cemetery; Green Bay, Wisconsin
- Spouses: Harriet K. Bailey; (m. 1862)
- Children: Sadie; Sarah; Mabel; Abbie
- Parents: Stranis Marshall (father); Mabel Marshall (mother)

James S. Marshall (March 22, 1819 – April 2, 1892) was an American politician and businessman who served as the 11th mayor of Green Bay, Wisconsin, from 1867 to 1868.

== Biography ==
Marshall was born on March 22, 1819, in Poultney, Vermont, one of five children born to Stranis and Mabel Marshall. As a young man, he moved to St. Louis, Missouri, and opened a boot and shoe store.

In 1857, he moved to Green Bay, Wisconsin, and continued his boot and shoe business. He later went into the lumber business in partnership with his brother, Linus M. Marshall.

Marshall was elected to a one-year term as Mayor of Green Bay in the spring 1867 election.

== Family and personal life ==
James S. Marshall married Harriet K. Bailey on November 23, 1862. They had four daughters together.

Marshall died on April 2, 1892.
