= Charles D. Robinson =

American politician (1822–1886)

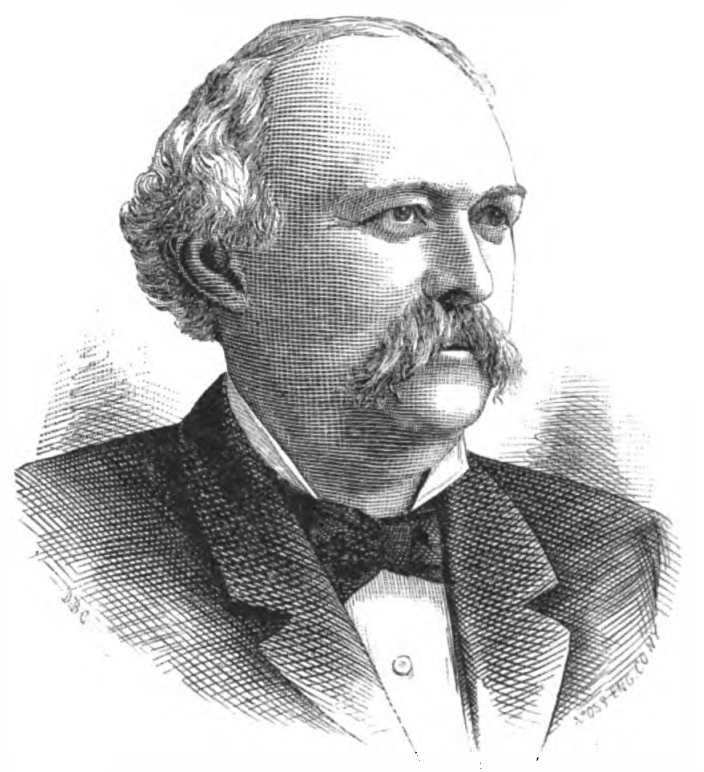

3rd Secretary of State of Wisconsin
- In office January 5, 1852 – January 2, 1854
- Governor: Leonard J. Farwell
- Preceded by: William A. Barstow
- Succeeded by: Alexander T. Gray

11th and 15th Mayor of Green Bay, Wisconsin
- In office April 1872 – April 1873
- Preceded by: Alonzo Kimball
- Succeeded by: Alonzo Kimball
- In office April 1866 – April 1867
- Preceded by: Myron P. Lindsley
- Succeeded by: James S. Marshall

Member of the Wisconsin State Assembly from the Brown County district
- In office January 7, 1850 – January 6, 1851
- Preceded by: John F. Meade
- Succeeded by: John F. Lessey

Personal details
- Born: October 22, 1822 Marcellus, New York, U.S.
- Died: September 25, 1886 (aged 63) Green Bay, Wisconsin, U.S.
- Resting place: Woodlawn Cemetery, Green Bay, Wisconsin, U.S.
- Party: Democratic
- Spouses: Sarah A. Wilcox (m. 1846; died 1852); Abigail Colburn Ballou (m. 1854–1886)
- Children: with Sarah Wilcox; Randall A. Robinson; Virginia I. Robinson; with Abigail Ballou; George Ballou Robinson

Military service
- Allegiance: United States
- Branch/service: United States Volunteers; Union Army
- Years of service: 1861–1864
- Rank: Captain, USV; Quartermaster
- Unit: Army of the Potomac
- Battles/wars: American Civil War

Charles Dayon Robinson (October 22, 1822 – September 25, 1886) was an American businessman, Democratic politician, and Wisconsin pioneer. He served as the 3rd Secretary of State of Wisconsin, and was the Mayor of Green Bay, Wisconsin, in 1866 and 1872.

== Early life and education ==
Charles D. Robinson was born in Marcellus, New York. His father died when he was young, and he and his two siblings were raised by their mother. He was only formally educated until age twelve.

== Early career ==
He arrived in Green Bay, then part of the Wisconsin Territory, on July 4, 1846. On August 13 of that year, he published the first edition of The Green Bay Advocate—he continued publishing this paper until his death.

In November 1849, Robinson was elected to his first public office as representative of Brown County to the Wisconsin State Assembly for the 3rd Wisconsin Legislature. Two years later, in November 1851, he was elected as the Democratic Party candidate for Wisconsin Secretary of State. He served for two years under Whig Party Governor Leonard J. Farwell.

After leaving public office, he entered a partnership in the lumber business with future United States Senator Timothy O. Howe and Charles E. Tyler. His brother-in-law, David Ballou, bought out the business in 1855, after a fire. The business prospered until 1859, when it succumbed to the ongoing effects of the Panic of 1857.

== Civil War service ==
In the summer of 1861, after the outbreak of the American Civil War, Robinson enlisted for service with the Union Army. He was appointed to the staff of General Rufus King with the rank of Captain and assistant Quartermaster. In this capacity, he supervised the raising of bridges to assist the movement of the army in Virginia. He became extremely ill while camped at Fredericksburg, Virginia, and was sent to New York to recuperate. He ultimately resigned his commission on April 21, 1864, and returned to Green Bay. It was said his illness had so changed his appearance that his mother did not recognize him.

== Correspondence with President Lincoln ==
In 1864, after his resignation from the Army, Robinson sent a letter to President Abraham Lincoln, delivered via Governor of Wisconsin Alexander Randall. Lincoln read his letter and responded with a four-page response dated August 17, 1864. In his response, Lincoln defends his decision on emancipation as necessary for the Union cause. From Lincoln's response, it can be inferred that Robinson had written in opposition to abolition.

== Postbellum years ==
Robinson returned to public office when he was elected Mayor of Green Bay, Wisconsin, in 1866. And, in 1869, he was nominated by the Democratic Party as their candidate for Governor of Wisconsin. He was defeated in the November general election by incumbent Republican Governor Lucius Fairchild, who earned his third term.

During his one-year term as Mayor in 1866, he proposed the construction of the Green Bay & Lake Pepin Railway. In 1870, when the railroad was incorporated, Robinson was chosen as the first President of the company.

He was re-elected Mayor of Green Bay in 1872. During this term, he advocated for the construction of the Sturgeon Bay Canal and supported the extension of the Milwaukee & Northern Railroad to Green Bay.

In the summer of 1876, he was again struck by near-fatal illness and left Wisconsin to recuperate in New York.

== Personal life and family ==
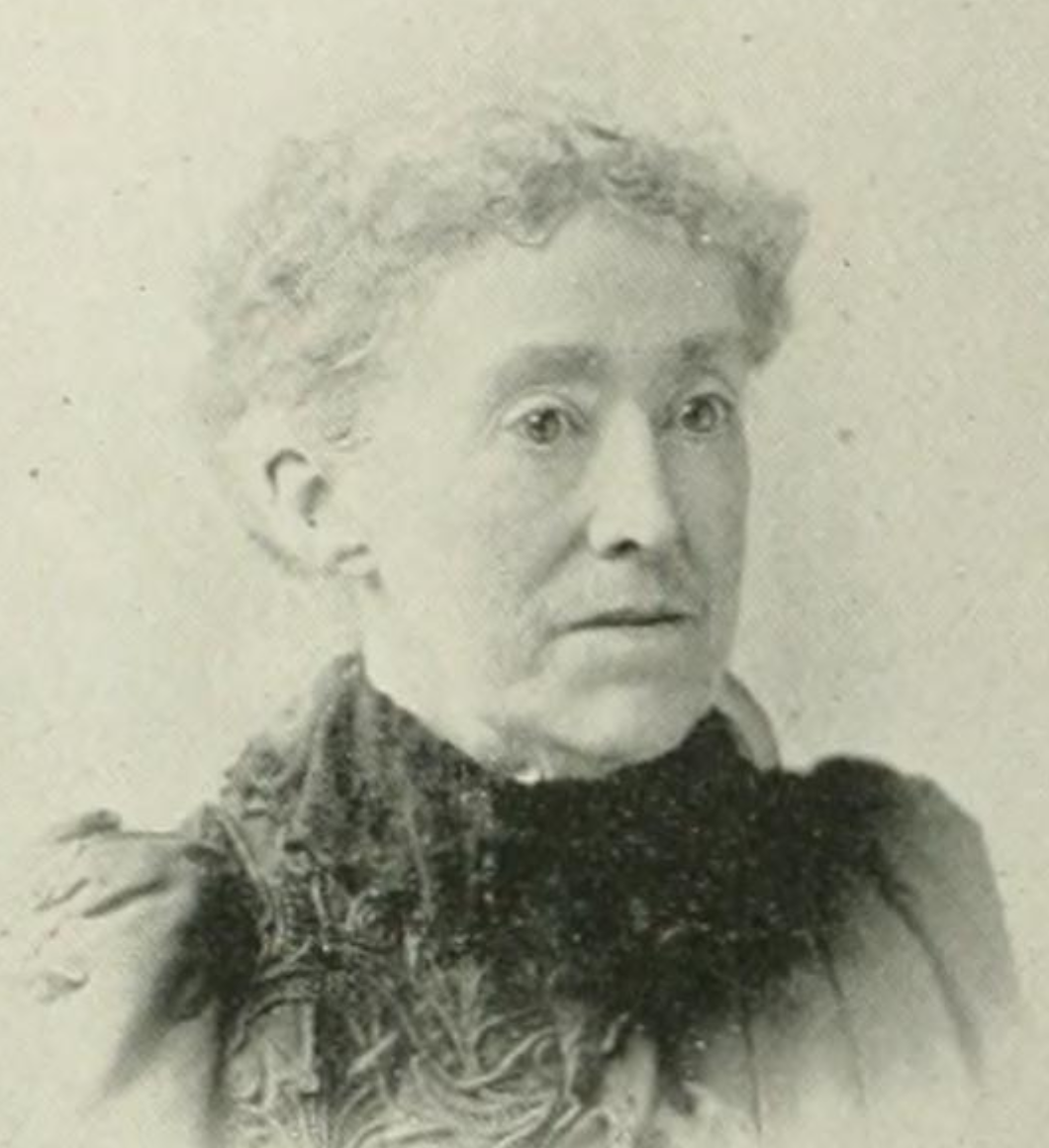
Abigail C. Robinson

Charles D. Robinson was married twice. His first wife was Sarah A. Wilcox, a daughter of De Pere, Wisconsin, pioneer and prominent local Democrat Randall Wilcox. Robinson married Sarah Wilcox on December 30, 1846, just a few months after his arrival in the Wisconsin Territory. They had two children together before her death in 1852. A year after Sarah's death, Charles's younger brother, Albert C. Robinson, married Martha Ann Wilcox, a sister of Sarah.

On July 12, 1854, Charles Robinson married for the second time, this time with Abigail "Abbie" Colburn Ballou. Robinson was financially involved with Abbie's brother, David Ballou. They had one child, in 1864, who died in infancy.

Abbie was active in the management of Robinson's paper, the Advocate, and took over as publisher of the paper when his health began to fail in 1881. She continued running the paper for two years after his death.

Robinson died in Green Bay, September 25, 1886.

== Electoral history ==
=== Wisconsin Secretary of State (1851) ===
Wisconsin Secretary of State Election, 1851
Party	Candidate	Votes	%	±%
General Election, November 4, 1851
Democratic	Charles D. Robinson	25,015	56.33%	+2.58pp
Whig	Robert W. Wright	16,438	37.01%	+2.80pp
Free Soil	Edward D. Holton	2,942	6.62%	−5.42pp
	Scattering	15	0.03%	
Plurality		8,577	19.31%	-0.22%
Total votes		44,410	100.0%	+41.96%
Democratic hold				

=== Wisconsin Governor (1869) ===
Wisconsin Gubernatorial Election, 1869
Party	Candidate	Votes	%	±%
General Election, November 2, 1869
Republican	Lucius Fairchild (incumbent)	69,502	53.14%	+1.48pp
Democratic	Charles D. Robinson	61,239	46.83%	−1.50pp
	Scattering	40	0.03%	
Plurality		8,263	6.32%	+2.98pp
Total votes		130,781	100.0%	-8.24%
Republican hold				

== Published works ==
- Robinson, Charles D. (1873). The Birth-Places of Americanism. Atwood & Culver.

Party political offices
Preceded by William A. Barstow	Democratic nominee for Secretary of State of Wisconsin; 1851	Succeeded by Alexander T. Gray
Preceded by John J. Tallmadge	Democratic nominee for Governor of Wisconsin; 1869	Succeeded by James Rood Doolittle
Wisconsin State Assembly
Preceded by John F. Meade	Member of the Wisconsin State Assembly from the Brown County district January 7, 1850 – January 6, 1851	Succeeded by John F. Lessey
Political offices
Preceded by William A. Barstow	Secretary of State of Wisconsin; 1852 – 1854	Succeeded by Alexander T. Gray
Preceded by M. P. Lindsley	Mayor of Green Bay, Wisconsin; 1866 – 1867	Succeeded by James S. Marshall
Preceded by Alonzo Kimball	Mayor of Green Bay, Wisconsin; 1872 – 1873	Succeeded by Alonzo Kimball
