= James H. McGillan =

American politician (1870–1935)

34th Mayor of Green Bay, Wisconsin
- In office 1927–1929
- Preceded by: Wenzel Wiesner
- Succeeded by: John V. Diener

Personal details
- Born: January 7, 1870 Appleton, Wisconsin, U.S.
- Died: March 7, 1935 (aged 65)
- Cause of death: Myocardial infarction
- Party: Democratic
- Spouse: Gertrude Sommerville (m. 1901)
- Education: Lawrence University; University of Wisconsin Law School
- Occupation: Politician, lawyer

Military service
- Allegiance: United States
- Branch/service: United States Navy
- Battles/wars: World War I

James H. McGillan (January 7, 1870 – March 7, 1935) was an American politician and lawyer who served as the 34th mayor of Green Bay, Wisconsin, from 1927 to 1929.

== Biography ==
=== Early life and education ===
McGillan was born on January 7, 1870, in Appleton, Wisconsin. He attended Lawrence University and the University of Wisconsin Law School. Following graduation, he began practicing law in Marinette, Wisconsin, in 1891. He married Gertrude Sommerville on April 26, 1901. McGillan moved to Green Bay in 1900. During World War I, he served as an officer in the United States Navy. Following the war, he transferred to the United States Navy Reserve.

=== Political career ===
McGillan was mayor of Green Bay from 1927 to 1929. Previously, he had been city attorney of Marinette, district attorney of Marinette County, Wisconsin, and a state court judge. In 1928, he was a candidate for the United States House of Representatives from Wisconsin's 9th congressional district, losing to incumbent George J. Schneider. He was a Democrat.

=== Death ===
He died from a myocardial infarction on March 7, 1935.
