= Anton Klaus =

American businessman and 12th mayor of Green Bay, Wisconsin

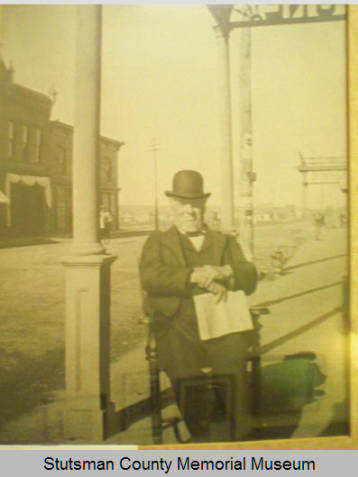
- Anton Klaus, c. 1895

12th Mayor of Green Bay, Wisconsin
- In office April 1868 – April 1871
- Preceded by: James S. Marshall
- Succeeded by: Alonzo Kimball

Personal details
- Born: December 30, 1829 Bruttig, Rhine Province, Prussia
- Died: July 22, 1897 (aged 67) Jamestown, North Dakota, U.S.
- Resting place: Allouez Catholic Cemetery and Chapel Mausoleum; Green Bay, Wisconsin
- Spouses: Appolonia Whiteson; (m. 1853; died 1894)
- Children: Atelia (step-daughter)^{(b. 1850)}; Appolonia Klaus^{(b. 1853)}; Mary Klaus^{(b. 1858)}; John Anton Klaus^{(b. 1860)}

Anton Klaus (December 30, 1829 – July 22, 1897) was a German American immigrant, businessman, and politician. He served as the 12th mayor of Green Bay, Wisconsin.

== Early life ==
Klaus was born in the town of Bruttig, in the Rhine Province in western Prussia (now western Germany). He was the fourth of five children.

He first came to Green Bay in 1849. By 1853, he was successfully managing a small hotel called the Green Bay House. In 1854, Green Bay was incorporated as a city, and in the spring of 1855, Klaus was elected the first city treasurer. He served one year as treasurer and then returned to his hotel business.

After the Panic of 1857, Klaus entered the lumber industry, first building a sawmill, then acquiring others. With these resources he entered the shingle trade. Over the next decade, Green Bay grew to become the primary shingle market in the world, and Klaus became the largest buyer, manufacturer, and trader of the material in the United States. Klaus became a major investor in Green Bay, buying and building all around the city. On the 1870 census, Klaus listed his real-estate value as $120,000 ($3.06 million in 2025 dollars).

== Political career ==
After his term as city treasurer, Klaus later served as Brown County treasurer. He served on the City Council for three terms before being elected mayor of Green Bay in the spring of 1868. He was re-elected twice in 1869 and 1870.

== Move West ==
The Panic of 1873 virtually bankrupted Klaus, and in 1874 he moved west to settle in Jamestown, North Dakota. He rose again in business, buying and selling buildings, land, and houses, and is considered one of the city's founders. Klaus donated land for a municipal park in Jamestown, North Dakota, which was named Anton Klaus Park for him.

== Family and personal life ==
Klaus married Appolonia Whiteson on November 8, 1853. They had four children.

Klaus died on July 22, 1899, in Jamestown, North Dakota. His wife preceded him in death; they are buried together at the Allouez Catholic Cemetery in Green Bay.
