= Wenzel Wiesner =

American politician (1877–1957)

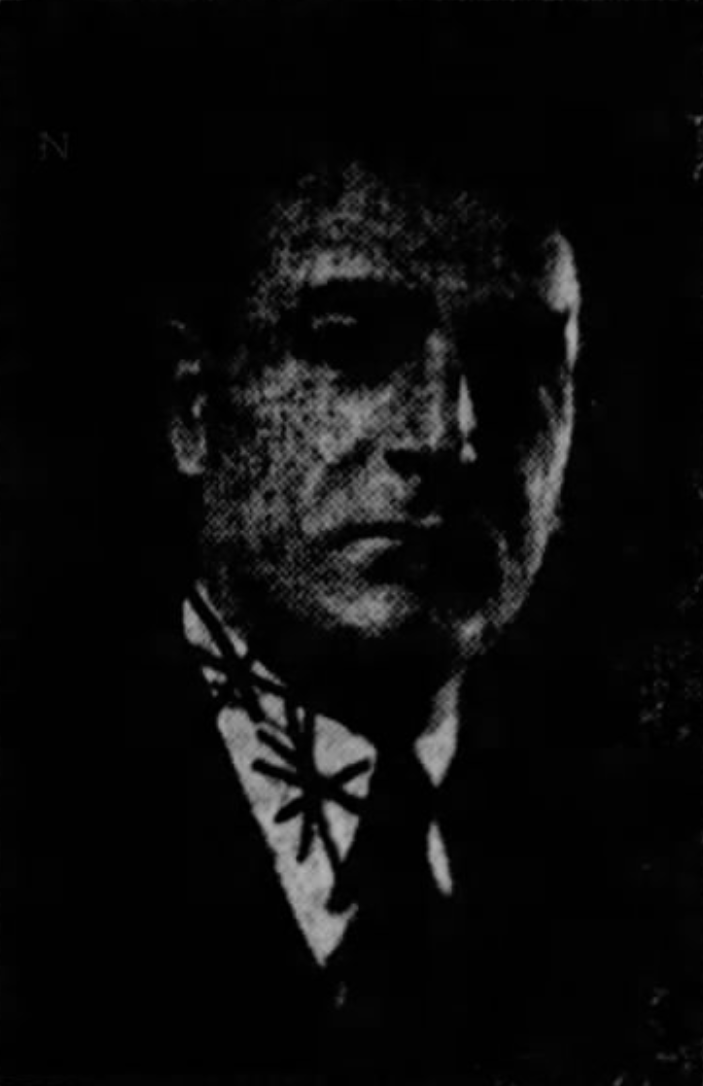
- Wiesner in a 1921 newspaper

Mayor of Green Bay, Wisconsin
- In office 1921–1927
- Preceded by: Elmer Hall
- Succeeded by: James H. McGillan

Personal details
- Born: April 18, 1877; Kewaunee County, Wisconsin, U.S.
- Died: May 21, 1957 (aged 80); Green Bay, Wisconsin, U.S.
- Resting place: Woodlawn Cemetery
- Spouse: Emma Drabonzel (m. 1899)
- Children: 2
- Occupation: Politician

Wenzel Wiesner (April 18, 1877 – May 21, 1957) was an American politician who served as the 33rd mayor of Green Bay, Wisconsin, from 1921 to 1927.

== Early life ==
Wenzel Wiesner was born on April 18, 1877, in Kewaunee County, Wisconsin.

== Career ==
Wiesner was city clerk for four years and alderman for two years in Kewaunee. He was the first secretary of the municipal lighting commission for three years and served as sheriff of Kewaunee County. In 1911, his family moved to Green Bay. He worked with organized labor, the vocational school board and the board of education in Green Bay. He was president of the federated trades council for 16 years, starting around 1919. In Kewaunee, he ran a clothing store and he had a position at a clothing store on Washington Street in Green Bay.

He was mayor of Green Bay from 1921 to 1927. He was the last mayor during the commission form of government in Green Bay. During his tenure, the water department and park department were organized, the fire department was motorized, street cleaning was mechanized and the first electric traffic signal was installed on Washington and East Walnut streets. He helped move the Green Bay Packers to Joannes Stadium and find the funding for the first 4,000 seats of City Stadium. He was a member of the Packers board of directors. He supported baseball in Green Bay, including the Green Bay Green Sox team. He was succeeded as mayor by James H. McGillin.

== Personal life ==
Wiesner married Emma Drabonzel in 1899. They had one son and one daughter, W. Edwin and Olga.

Wiesner died on May 21, 1957, at his home at 521 Clay Street in Green Bay. He was buried in Woodlawn Cemetery.
