= David W. Jones =

American politician

5th Secretary of State of Wisconsin
- In office January 7, 1856 – January 2, 1860
- Governor: William A. Barstow; Arthur MacArthur Sr. Coles Bashford; Alexander Randall
- Preceded by: Alexander T. Gray
- Succeeded by: Louis P. Harvey

Personal details
- Born: March 25, 1815 Merthyr Tydfil, Wales, U.K.
- Died: November 17, 1879 (aged 64) Joplin, Missouri, U.S.
- Party: Democratic
- Education: Madison College
- Profession: Lawyer

David W. Jones (March 25, 1815 – November 17, 1879) was a politician from the U.S. state of Wisconsin.

Born in Merthyr Tydfil, Wales, he moved to Uniontown, Pennsylvania at two years old with his family. He went to Madison College in Pennsylvania and studied law. Jones moved to Mineral Point, Wisconsin Territory in 1836, where he worked in the land office as clerk and receiver. He then became general paymaster for the Northwest. He then continued to study law and was admitted to the Wisconsin bar. Jones moved to Texas because of his health and then returned to Wisconsin. He died in Joplin, Missouri while returning to Wisconsin.

He served as that state's fifth Secretary of State, serving two terms from January 7, 1856, to January 2, 1860. He was a Democrat and served under Democratic governor William A. Barstow, Democratic acting-governor Arthur MacArthur, Sr., and Republican governors Coles Bashford and Alexander Randall.

He resided in Belmont, Wisconsin at the time of his election.

Political offices
| Preceded by Alexander Gray | Secretary of State of Wisconsin; 1856–1860 | Succeeded by Louis Harvey |
