= Charles Hartung =

American politician

Charles Hartung (February 19, 1841 – July 17, 1916) was mayor of Green Bay, Wisconsin.

== Biography ==
Hartung was born on February 19, 1841, in Germany, the son of Heinrich C. Hartung (1812–1905) and Christiane Auguste Marie Hartung (née Munzert, 1817–1886). He moved with his family to the United States when he was thirteen years old, settling in Two Rivers, Wisconsin. During the American Civil War, he enlisted in the 5th Wisconsin Volunteer Infantry Regiment of the Union Army. After a furlough due to a serious wound suffered during the Battle of Williamsburg, he returned to combat as an officer and became part of the Army of the Potomac. He achieved the rank of captain. Following the war, he moved to Green Bay. Hartung married Madalene Bader (1842–1913) in 1866. They had four children. He died at his home in Green Bay on July 17, 1916.

== Political career ==
Hartung was mayor from 1885 to 1888. In addition, he was an alderman for seven years. Twenty-three years after his term as an alderman expired, he was elected to the city council and served eight more years.
