= John C. Neville =

American politician (1815–1898)

John C. Neville (July 27, 1815 – October 30, 1898) was a member of the Wisconsin State Assembly and Mayor of Green Bay, Wisconsin.

== Biography ==
Neville was born John Neville on July 27, 1815 in Dublin, Ireland. He moved to the United States in the 1830s, settling in Pottsville, Pennsylvania. The following year, he married Catherine D. Lawton. J. C. and Catherine would have six children. Their son, Arthur, would also serve as Mayor of Green Bay and marry the great-niece of U.S. President Martin Van Buren. Neville moved to Green Bay in 1856. He died on October 30, 1898.

== Career ==
Neville studied law under Francis W. Hughes, future Attorney General of Pennsylvania, and became a lawyer in 1842. After moving to Green Bay, Neville became District Attorney of Brown County, Wisconsin and City Attorney of Green Bay. He was elected to the Assembly in 1859 and served as Mayor in 1880.
