= List of United States political families (D) =

The following is an alphabetical list of political families in the United States whose last name begins with D.

== The D'Alesandros and Pelosis ==
- Thomas L. J. D'Alesandro Jr. (1903–1987), U.S. Representative from Maryland, 1939–47; Mayor of Baltimore, 1947–59.
  - Thomas L. J. D'Alesandro III (1929–2019), Mayor of Baltimore, 1967–71; son of Thomas Jr.
  - Nancy Pelosi (née D'Alesandro) (born 1940), Speaker, United States House of Representatives, 2007–11, 2019–2023; Minority Leader of the United States House of Representatives, 2005–07, 2011–2019; U.S. Representative from California, 1987–present; daughter of Thomas Jr.
    - Christine Pelosi (born 1966), delegate to the Democratic National Convention, 2000, 2004, 2008; Democratic National Committeewoman 2008. Daughter of Nancy Pelosi.

== The D'Amatos ==
- Alfonse M. D'Amato (born 1937), United States Senator from New York State 1981–98, Town of Hempstead, New York Presiding Supervisor 1978–80, Vice Chairman of Nassau County, New York Board of Supervisors 1977–80, Town of Hempstead, New York Supervisor 1971–77, Receiver of Taxes for Town of Hempstead, New York 1969–70, Public Administrator of Nassau County, New York 1965–68, Founder of Park Strategies. Brother of Armand D'Amato.
- Armand D'Amato (born 1944), Member of New York State Assembly 1973–87, partner of Park Strategies, brother of Al D'Amato.
  - Penelope D'Amato, Delegate to the Republican National Convention in 1972, ex-wife of Al D'Amato.
  - Christopher P. D'Amato, Senior Counsel in the Enforcement Division of the U.S. Securities and Exchange Commission's Northeast Regional Office in New York 1999–2001, Assistant District Attorney in the Trial Division of the Manhattan District Attorney's Office in New York 1995–98, Vice President of Park Strategies. Son of Al D'Amato.
  - Jerome C. Murphy, New York Supreme Court Justice in 10th Judicial District 2012–present, Village Justice for Island Park, New York 1987–2002, married to Lisa D'Amato, son-in-law of Al D'Amato.
  - Simon Ribeiro (born 1981), Candidate for Congress in Illinois 9th District 2006, Candidate for Congress in Illinois District 5 2009, Candidate for Illinois Congress District 9 2010, Candidate for Congress in Illinois District 9 2012, mother is JoAnne D'Amato, sister of Al D'Amato. Nephew of Al D'Amato.

== The Dahles ==
- Onon B. Dahle, Clerk of Perry, Wisconsin; Treasurer of Perry, Wisconsin; Justice of the Peace; Superintendent of Schools of Perry, Wisconsin. Father of Herman Dahle.
  - Herman Dahle (1855–1920), U.S. Representative from Wisconsin 1899–1903. Son of Onon B. Dahle.

== The Dahles of California ==
- Brian Dahle (born 1965), Member of the Lassen County Board of Supervisors 1996–2012, Member of the California State Assembly 2012–19, California State Senator 2019–present.
- Megan Dahle (born 1975), Member of the California State Assembly 2019–present. Wife of Brian Dahle.

== The Dales ==
- George N. Dale, Lieutenant Governor of Vermont 1870–72. Father of Porter H. Dale.
  - Porter H. Dale (1867–1933), Vermont State Senator 1910–12, U.S. Representative from Vermont 1915–23, U.S. Senator from Vermont 1923–33. Son of George N. Dale.

== The Daleys ==
Two members of the Daley family served as Mayor of Chicago, between them ruling the city for more than a third of a century.

- Richard J. Daley (1902–1976), mayor from 1955 until 1976, also served in Illinois General Assembly.
  - Richard M. Daley (born 1942), mayor from 1989 to 2011. Son of Richard J.
  - William M. Daley (born 1948), U.S. Secretary of Commerce, 1997–2000. Son of Richard J.
  - John P. Daley, Cook County Commissioner. Son of Richard J.

== The Dallases, Pells, and Baches ==
- Alexander J. Dallas (1759–1817), U.S. Secretary of the Treasury 1814–16. Father of George M. Dallas.
  - George M. Dallas (1792–1864), Mayor of Philadelphia, Pennsylvania 1828–29; U.S. Senator from Pennsylvania 1831–33; Attorney General of Pennsylvania 1833–35; Envoy Extraordinary and Minister Plenipotentiary to Russia 1835–37; Vice President of the United States 1845–49; Envoy Extraordinary and Minister Plenipotentiary to the United Kingdom 1856–61. Son of Alexander J. Dallas and uncle of Alexander Dallas Bache.
    - Alexander Dallas Bache (1806–1867), Superintendent of the United States Coast Survey 1843–1865. Nephew of George M. Dallas.
    - Robert J. Walker (1801–1869), U.S. Senator from Mississippi 1835–45, U.S. Secretary of the Treasury 1845–49, Governor of Kansas Territory 1857. Nephew by marriage of George M. Dallas.
      - Benjamin Harris Brewster (1816–1888), Attorney General of Pennsylvania 1867–68, Attorney General of the United States 1882–85. Son-in-law of Robert J. Walker.
        - Claiborne Pell (1918–2009), U.S. Senator from Rhode Island 1961–97. Great-great-grandnephew of George M. Dallas.
          - Daniel Brewster (1923–2007), Maryland House Delegate 1950–58, U.S. Representative from Maryland 1959–63, U.S. Senator from Maryland 1963–69. Great-grandson of Benjamin Harris Brewster.

NOTE: Robert J. Walker was also grandson-in-law of Congressional Delegate Benjamin Franklin. Claiborne Pell is also son of U.S. Representative Herbert C. Pell Jr., great-great-grandson of U.S. Representative John Francis Hamtramck Claiborne, and great-great-grandnephew of William C.C. Claiborne and Nathaniel Herbert Claiborne.

== The Daltons ==
- S.P. Dalton (1892–1965), Prosecuting Attorney of Cape Girardeau County, Missouri 1927–28 1931–34; Justice of the Missouri Supreme Court 1950–56 1958–65; Chief Justice of the Missouri Supreme Court 1956–58. Brother of John M. Dalton.
- John M. Dalton (1900–1972), Attorney General of Missouri 1953–61, Governor of Missouri 1961–65. Brother of S.P. Dalton.

== The Danahers ==
- John A. Danaher (1899–1990), Connecticut Secretary of State 1933–35, U.S. Senator from Connecticut 1939–45, delegate to the Republican National Convention 1944, Judge of the U.S. Court of Appeals for the District of Columbia Circuit 1953–69. Brother of Francis R. Danaher.
- Francis R. Danaher, Mayor of Meriden, Connecticut, 1938–48. Brother of John A. Danaher.
  - John A. Danaher III, U.S. Attorney of Connecticut 2001–02, Connecticut Commissioner of Public Safety 2007–present. Grandson of John A. Danaher.

== The Danforths and Rhoadses ==
- Henry Rhoads (1739–1814), member of the Kentucky Legislature 1788–96. Granduncle of John P. Rhoads.
  - John P. Rhoads (1818–1866), California Assemblyman 1863–65. Grandnephew of Henry Rhoads.
    - John C. Danforth (born 1936), Attorney General of Missouri 1969–1976l candidate for the Republican nomination for U.S. Senate from Missouri, 1970; U.S. Senator from Missouri 1976–95; U.S. Ambassador to the United Nations 2004–05. Descendant of Henry Rhoads.

== The Daniels ==
- Peter Vivian Daniel (1784–1860), Member of the Virginia House of Delegates 1808–10. Judge of the United States District Court for the Eastern District of Virginia 1836–41. Associate Justice of the Supreme Court of the United States 1841–60.
  - Robert Williams Daniel (1884–1940), Member of the Virginia Senate 1936–1940. Great-grandson of Peter Vivian Daniel.
    - Robert Williams Daniel Jr. (1936–2012), Member of the U.S. House of Representatives 1972–83. Son of Robert Williams Daniel.

== The Daniels and Houstons ==
- Samuel Houston (1793–1863), U.S. Representative from Tennessee 1923–27, Governor of Tennessee 1927–29, President of the Republic of Texas 1836–38 1841–44, Texas Republic Representative 1838, U.S. Senator from Texas 1846–59, Governor of Texas 1859–61. Great-great-grandfather-in-law of Price Daniel.
  - Price Daniel (1910–1988), Texas State Representative 1939–45, delegate to the Democratic National Convention 1940 1948 1964, Attorney General of Texas 1947–53, U.S. Senator from Texas 1953–57, Governor of Texas 1957–63, Justice of the Texas Supreme Court. Great-great-grandson-in-law of Samuel Houston.
    - Price Daniel Jr. (1941–1981), Texas State Representative 1969–78, delegate to the Texas Constitutional Convention 1974, candidate for Democratic nomination for Attorney General of Texas 1978. Son of Price Daniel.

NOTE: Samuel Houston was also father of U.S. Senator Andrew Jackson Houston and cousin of U.S. Representative David Hubbard. Price Daniel was also brother of Guam Governor William Daniel.

== The Daniels and Worths ==
- Jonathan Worth (1802–1869), North Carolina State Representative 1831–35, North Carolina State Senator, candidate for U.S. Representative from North Carolina, North Carolina State Treasurer 1863–65, Governor of North Carolina 1865–68. Brother of John M. Worth.
- John M. Worth (1810–1900), North Carolina State Senator 1870–76, North Carolina Treasurer 1876–85. Brother of Jonathan Worth.
  - Josephus Daniels (1862–1948), Chief Clerk of the United States Department of the Interior 1893–95, U.S. Secretary of the Navy 1913–21, U.S. Ambassador to Mexico 1933–41. Grandson-in-law of Jonathan Worth.
    - Jonathan W. Daniels (1902–1981), White House Press Secretary 1945, Democratic National Committeeman, delegate to the Democratic National Convention 1948 1952. Son of Josephus Daniels.

== The Danners ==
- Patsy A. Danner (born 1934), Missouri State Senator 1983–93, U.S. Representative from Missouri 1993–2001. Mother of Steve Danner.
  - Steve Danner, Missouri State Senator, candidate for U.S. Representative from Missouri 2000. Son of Patsy A. Danner.

== The Darlingtons and Butlers ==
- Edward Darlington (1755–1825), Pennsylvania State Representative 1802–04 1811–13. Father of William Darlington.
  - William Darlington (1782–1863), U.S. Representative from Pennsylvania 1815–17 1819–23. Son of Edward Darlington.
  - Isaac Darlington (1781–1839), Pennsylvania State Representative 1807–09, U.S. Representative from Pennsylvania 1817–19, District Judge in Pennsylvania 1821–39. Nephew of Edward Darlington.
  - Edward Darlington (1795–1884), U.S. Representative from Pennsylvania 1833–39, District Attorney of Delaware County, Pennsylvania 1851–54. Nephew of Edward Darlington.
  - William Darlington (1804–1879), delegate to the Pennsylvania Constitutional Convention 1837 1879. Nephew of Edward Darlington.
  - James B. Roberts (1784–1822), Pennsylvania State Representative 1814–15. Nephew by marriage of Edward Darlington.
    - Smedley Darlington (1827–1899), delegate to the Liberal Republican Party National Convention 1872, delegate to the Republican National Convention 1896, U.S. Representative from Pennsylvania 1887–91. Grandnephew of Edward Darlington.
      - Thomas S. Butler (1855–1928), Pennsylvania State Court Judge 1888, U.S. Representative from Pennsylvania 1897–1928. Son-in-law of Smedley Darlington.
        - Smedley Butler (1881–1940), candidate for U.S. Senate from Pennsylvania 1932. Son of Thomas S. Butler.

NOTE: Thomas S. Butler was also son of Pennsylvania Treasurer Samuel Butler and nephew of U.S. District Court Judge William Butler.

== The Davenports ==
- John Davenport (1752–1830), U.S. Representative from Connecticut 1799–1817. Brother of James Davenport.
- James Davenport (1758–1797), Judge of the Court of Common Pleas in Connecticut, Connecticut State Representative, Connecticut State Senator, Judge of the Fairfield County, Connecticut Court 1792–96; U.S. Representative from Connecticut 1796–97. Brother of John Davenport.

== The Davises ==
- John J. Davis (1835–1916), Virginia House Delegate 1861, West Virginia House Delegate 1870, U.S. Representative from West Virginia 1871–75, delegate to the Democratic National Convention 1876. Father of John W. Davis.
  - John W. Davis (1873–1955), West Virginia House Delegate 1899, delegate to the Democratic National Convention 1904 1928 1932, U.S. Representative from West Virginia 1911–13, Solicitor General of the United States 1913–18, U.S. Ambassador to Great Britain 1918–21, candidate for Democratic nomination for President of the United States 1920, candidate for President of the United States 1924. Son of John J. Davis.

NOTE: John W. Davis was also first cousin of U.S. Secretary of State Cyrus R. Vance.

== The Davises of Kentucky ==
- Robert Trimble (1776–1828), Judge of the United States District Court for the District of Kentucky 1817–26, Associate Justice of the Supreme Court of the United States 1826–28. Father-in-law of Garrett Davis.
  - Amos Davis (1794–1835), Sheriff of Montgomery County, Kentucky; Kentucky State Representative 1819 1825 1827–28; candidate for U.S. Representative from Kentucky 1826 1830; U.S. Representative from Kentucky 1833–35. Brother of Garrett Davis.
  - Garrett Davis (1801–1872), Kentucky State Representative 1833–35, U.S. Representative from Kentucky 1839–47, U.S. Senator from Kentucky 1861–72. Brother of Amos Davis.
  - James G. Jones (1814–1872), first Mayor of Evansville, Indiana 1847–1853; Indiana Attorney General 1860–1861. Grandson of Robert Trimble.
    - Eccles G. Van Riper (born 1841), Mayor of Evansville 1871. Son-in-law of James G. Jones.

== The Davises of Minnesota and Wisconsin ==
- Horatio N. Davis, County Treasurer of Waukesha County, Wisconsin Territory; Chairman of the town board of Waukesha; Chairman of the county board of Waukesha County; Mayor of Beloit, Wisconsin; Wisconsin State Senator. Father of Cushman Kellogg Davis.
  - Cushman Kellogg Davis (1838–1900), Minnesota State Representative 1867, U.S. Attorney of Minnesota 1868–73, Governor of Minnesota 1874–76, U.S. Senator from Minnesota 1887–1900, delegate to the Republican National Convention 1900. Son of Horatio N. Davis.

== The Davises of Nebraska and Virginia ==
- Clarence A. Davis, Attorney General of Nebraska 1919–23, delegate to the Republican National Convention 1928 1932. Grandfather of Thomas M. Davis.
  - Thomas M. Davis (born 1949), U.S. Representative from Virginia 1995–2008. Grandson of Clarence A. Davis.

== The Davises of North Dakota and Iowa ==
- John E. Davis (1913–1990), North Dakota state senator 1952–1956, Governor of North Dakota 1957–1961, director of the Office of Civil Defense 1969–1972, director of the Defense Civil Preparedness Agency 1972–1977. Brother of Wilson.
- Wilson Davis (1917–2003), Iowa state senator 1969–1973. Brother of John.

== The Davises of Wisconsin ==
- Glenn Robert Davis (1914–1988), U.S. Representative from Wisconsin 1947–57 1965–74, delegate to the Republican National Convention 1952 1956 1960 1964 1968 1972. Father of J.M. Davis.
  - J. Mac Davis, Wisconsin State Senator, Chief Judge of Waukesha County, Wisconsin. Son of Glenn Robert Davis.

== The Davises and Dennys ==
- John Wesley Davis (1799–1859), U.S. Representative from Indiana 1835–1837, 1839–1841, 1843–1847; Speaker of the U.S. House of Representatives 1845–1847; U.S. Ambassador to China 1848–1850; Governor of Oregon Territory 1853–1854.
  - James C. Denny (1829–1887), Indiana Attorney General 1872–1874. Son-in-law of John Wesley Davis.

== The Davises and Elkinses ==
- Henry G. Davis (1823–1916), West Virginia House Delegate, West Virginia State Senator 1868 1870, U.S. Senator from West Virginia 1871–83, candidate for Vice President of the United States 1904. Brother of Thomas Beall Davis.
- Thomas Beall Davis (1828–1911), West Virginia Democratic Executive Committeeman 1876–1907, West Virginia House Delegate 1899–1900, U.S. Representative from West Virginia 1905–07. Brother of Henry G. Davis.
  - Stephen B. Elkins (1841–1911), New Mexico Territory Representative 1864–65, Attorney General of New Mexico Territory 1867, U.S. District Attorney of New Mexico Territory 1867–70, U.S. Congressional Delegate from New Mexico Territory 1873–77, U.S. Secretary of War 1891–93, U.S. Senator from West Virginia 1895–1911. Son-in-law of Henry G. Davis.
    - Davis Elkins (1876–1959), U.S. Senator from West Virginia 1911 1919–25, delegate to the Republican National Convention 1916. Son of Stephen B. Elkins.

== The Davises and Lodges ==
The Davis family is related by marriage to The Lodges and The Cabots

- John Davis (1787–1854), congressman from Massachusetts 1825 to 1834, Governor of Massachusetts 1834 to 1835; 1841 to 1843, senator from Massachusetts 1835 to 1841; 1845 to 1853.
- George Bancroft (1800–1891), United States Secretary of the Navy 1845 to 1846; U.S. Minister to the United Kingdom 1846 to 1849; U.S. Minister to Berlin 1849 to 1867. Brother-in-law of John Davis
  - John Chandler Bancroft Davis (1822–1907), Assistant US Secretary of State 1869 to 1871; 1873 to 1874; 1881 to 1882, US Ambassador to Germany 1874 to 1877, Judge of the Court of Claims 1877–81 1882–83, United States Supreme Court Reporter of Decisions 1883 to 1902.
  - Horace Davis (1831–1916), congressman from California 1877 to 1881.
    - John Davis (1851–1902), Judge of the Court of Claims 1885–1902. Grandson of John Davis.
      - Henry Cabot Lodge Jr. (1902–1985), U.S. Senator from Massachusetts, 1937–44 and 1947–53; Ambassador to the UN, 1953–60; Republican nominee for vice president, 1960; Ambassador to Vietnam, 1963–64 and 1965–67; Ambassador to Germany, 1968–69; candidate for the Republican nomination for president in 1964; great-great-grandson of John Davis and brother of John Davis Lodge.
      - John Davis Lodge (1903–1985), 1933–40; U.S. Representative from Connecticut, 1947–51; governor of Connecticut, 1951–55; U.S. Ambassador to Spain, 1955–61; Ambassador to Argentina, 1969–73; Ambassador to Switzerland, 1983–85; great-great-grandson of John Davis and brother of Henry Cabot Lodge Jr.
        - George C. Lodge (born 1927), candidate for U.S. Senate from Massachusetts 1962, delegate to the Republican National Convention 1964. Son of Henry Cabot Lodge Jr.

NOTE: Henry Cabot Lodge Jr. and John Davis Lodge were also great-great-great-grandsons of U.S. Senator George Cabot, great-great-grandsons of U.S. Senator Elijah Hunt Mills, great-grandsons of U.S. Secretary of State Frederick T. Frelinghuysen, grandsons of U.S. Senator Henry Cabot Lodge, nephews by marriage of U.S. Representative Augustus P. Gardner, and first cousins once removed of Connecticut State Representative William A.G. Minot. Henry Cabot Lodge Jr. was also great-great-grandson-in-law of U.S. Senator Jonathan Mason and brother-in-law of New Jersey Treasurer Archibald S. Alexander. John Davis Lodge was also brother-in-law of U.S. Consul General D. Chadwick Braggiotti.

== The Davises and Roots ==
- Daniel Davis (1768–1847), Connecticut State Representative 1811–12. Uncle of Noah Davis.
  - Noah Davis (1818–1902), Justice of the New York Supreme Court 1857–68 1873–87, delegate to the Republican National Convention 1860, U.S. Representative from New York 1869–70, U.S. Attorney in New York 1870–72. Nephew of Daniel Davis.
  - Joseph P. Root (1826–1885), Connecticut State Representative 1855, Kansas Territory Councilman 1857, Lieutenant Governor of Kansas 1861–63, U.S. Minister to Chile 1870–73, delegate to the Republican National Convention 1884. First cousin once removed of Daniel Davis.

== The Davises and Tredwells ==
- Thomas Tredwell (1743–1831), New York Colony Councilman 1774–75, delegate to the New York Constitutional Convention 1776 1777 1801, New York Assemblyman 1777–83, Probate Court Judge in New York 1778–87, New York State Senator 1786–89 1803–07, U.S. Representative from New York 1791–95. Grandfather of Thomas Treadwell Davis.
  - Thomas Treadwell Davis (1810–1872), U.S. Representative from New York 1863–67. Grandson of Thomas Tredwell.

== The Daweses ==
- Rufus R. Dawes (1838–1899), U.S. Representative from Ohio 1881–83. Father of Charles G. Dawes, Rufus C. Dawes, and Beman G. Dawes.
  - Charles G. Dawes (1865–1951), Comptroller of the Currency of the United States Department of the Treasury 1898–1901, candidate for U.S. Senate from Illinois, 1901, Director of the Bureau of the Budget 1921–22, Vice President of the United States 1925–29, U.S. Ambassador to the United Kingdom 1929–32, Chairman of the Reconstruction Finance Corporation. Son of Rufus R. Dawes.
  - Rufus C. Dawes (1867–1940), delegate to the 1920 Illinois Constitutional Convention. Son of Rufus R. Dawes.
  - Beman G. Dawes (1870–1953), U.S. Representative from Ohio 1905–09. Son of Rufus R. Dawes.

== The Dawsons ==
- Thomas Cleland Dawson (1865–1912), U.S. Minister to Santo Domingo, Dominican Republic 1904–07; U.S. Consul General in Santo Domingo, Dominican Republic 1904–07; U.S. Minister to Colombia 1907–09; U.S. Minister to Chile 1909; U.S. Minister to Panama 1910. Father of Allan Dawson.
  - Allan Dawson (1903–1949), U.S. Vice Consul in Rio de Janeiro, Brazil 1925–26; U.S. Vice Consul in Bahia, Brazil 1926–27; U.S. Consul in Hamburg, Germany 1937–39. Son of Thomas Cleland Dawson.

== The Dawsons, Johnson, and Wickliffes ==
- John Bennett Dawson (1798–1845), member of the Louisiana Legislature, U.S. Representative from Louisiana 1841–45. Brother-in-law of Isaac Johnson.
- Isaac Johnson (1803–1853), Louisiana State Representative, Louisiana Secretary of State, Governor of Louisiana 1846–50, Attorney General of Louisiana. Brother-in-law of John Bennett Dawson.
  - Robert C. Wickliffe (1819–1895), Louisiana State Senator, Governor of Louisiana 1856–60, delegate to the Democratic National Convention 1876. Son-in-law of John Bennett Dawson.

NOTE: Robert C. Wickliffe was also son of U.S. Postmaster General Charles A. Wickliffe and uncle of U.S. Senator J.C.W. Beckham.

== The Days ==
- Luther T. Day (1813–1885), Justice of the Ohio Supreme Court 1865–75. Father of William Rufus Day.
  - William Rufus Day (1849–1923), Common Pleas Court Judge in Ohio 1886–90, U.S. Secretary of State 1898, Judge of U.S. Court of Appeals 1899–1903, Justice of the U.S. Supreme Court 1903–22. Son of Luther T. Day.
    - William Louis Day (1876–1936), U.S. Attorney in Ohio 1908–11, U.S. District Judge in Ohio 1911–14. Son of William Rufus Day.
    - Stephen A. Day (1882–1950), candidate for U.S. Representative from Illinois 1938, U.S. Representative from Illinois 1941–44. Son of William Rufus Day.

== The Days and O'Connors ==
- Sandra Day O'Connor (born 1930), Arizona State Senator 1969–75, Judge of the Maricopa County Superior Court 1975–79, Judge of the Arizona Court of Appeals 1979–81, Associate Justice of the Supreme Court of the United States 1981–2006.
- Ann Day (1938–2016), Arizona State Senator 1990–2000, member of the Pima County, Arizona Board of Supervisors from 2000 to 2012. Sister of Sandra Day O'Connor.

== The Daytons ==
- Elias Dayton (1737–1807), Delegate to the Continental Congress from New Jersey 1778, New Jersey Assemblyman 1791–92 1794–96, Mayor of Elizabethtown, New Jersey 1796–1805. Father of Jonathan Dayton.
  - Jonathan Dayton (1760–1824), New Jersey Assemblyman 1786–87 1790 1814–15, Delegate to the Constitutional Convention from New Jersey 1787–88, New Jersey Councilman 1790, U.S. Representative from New Jersey 1791–99, Speaker of the U.S. House of Representatives 1795–97 1797–99, U.S. Senator from New Jersey 1799–1805. Son of Elias Dayton.
    - William L. Dayton (1807–1864), New Jersey State Senator 1837, New Jersey Councilman 1837–38, Justice of the New Jersey Supreme Court 1838–1841, U.S. Senator from New Jersey 1842–51, candidate for Vice President of the United States 1856, Attorney General of New Jersey 1857–61, U.S. Minister to France 1861–64. Distant relative of Jonathan Dayton.
      - William L. Dayton (1839–1897), U.S. Minister to the Netherlands 1882–85. Son of William L. Dayton.

== The Dearborns ==
- Henry Dearborn (1751–1829), U.S. Representative from Massachusetts 1793–97, U.S. Secretary of War 1801–09, Collector of the Port of Boston, Massachusetts 1809–12; U.S. Minister to Portugal 1822–24. Father of Henry Alexander Scammell Dearborn.
  - Henry Alexander Scammell Dearborn (1783–1851), Collector of the Port of Boston, Massachusetts 1812–29; delegate to the Massachusetts Constitutional Convention 1820; Massachusetts State Representative 1829; Massachusetts State Senator 1830; U.S. Representative from Massachusetts 1831–33; Mayor of Roxbury, Massachusetts 1847–51. Son of Henry Dearborn.

== The DeConcinis ==
- Evo Anton DeConcini, Attorney General of Arizona 1948–49, Justice of the Arizona Supreme Court. Father of Dennis DeConcini.
  - Dennis DeConcini (born 1937), Attorney of Pimna County, Arizona 1973–76; U.S. Senator from Arizona 1977–95. Son of Evo Anton DeConcini.

== The Deens ==
- Jesse C. Deen, member of the Louisiana House of Representatives 1972–88. Father of Larry Deen.
- Larry Deen, sheriff of Bossier Parish, Louisiana 1988–2012. Son of Jesse C. Deen.

== The Defrees and Frazers ==
- John D. Defrees (1810–1882), Indiana State Representative 1840–42, Indiana State Senator 1842–45, Chairman of the Indiana Republican Party 1856–60, Republican National Committeeman 1866–68. Brother of Joseph H. Defrees.
- Joseph H. Defrees (1812–1885), Sheriff of Elkhart County, Indiana 1835–40; Indiana State Representative; Indiana State Senator 1850–54; U.S. Representative from Indiana 1865–67. Brother of John D. Defrees.
- James Somerville Frazer (1824–1893), Indiana State Representative 1847–49 1855, Justice of the Indiana Supreme Court 1865–71, Indiana State Court Judge 1889–90. Brother-in-law of John D. Defrees and Joseph H. Defrees.
  - William Frazer (1824–1893), Indiana State Representative 1881–83. Son of James Somerville Frazer.
- Joseph Mitchell (1837–1890), Justice of the Indiana Supreme Court 1885–1890. Son-in-law of Joseph H. Defrees.
  - Francis E. Baker (1860–1924), Justice of the Indiana Supreme Court 1899–1902, United States Circuit Court judge 1902–1911, and United States Court of Appeals judge 1902–1924. Nephew of Joseph Mitchell.

== The deGravelles ==
- Charles deGravelles (1913–2008), Republican state chairman in Louisiana 1964–68, husband of Virginia deGravelles
- Mary Virginia Wheadon deGravelles (1915–2017), Republican national committeewoman in Louisiana 1964–68, wife of Charles deGravelles

== The Delaneys ==
- John Delaney (born 1963), U.S. Representative from Maryland 2013–2019; candidate for the Democratic nomination for President of the United States 2020. Husband of April McClain Delaney.
- April McClain Delaney (born 1964), U.S. Deputy Assistant Secretary of Commerce for Communications and Information 2023–2024; U.S. Representative from Maryland 2025–present. Wife of John Delaney.

== The Delavans and Depews ==
- Charles H. Delavan (1810–1892), U.S. Consul in St. Thomas, Virgin Islands 1849–50. Cousin of Chauncey M. Depew.
  - Chauncey M. Depew (1834–1928), New York Assemblyman 1862–63, New York Secretary of States 1864–65, Clerk of Westchester County, New York 1867; delegate to the Republican National Convention 1862 1892 1896 1900 1904 1908 1912 1916 1920 1924; candidate for New York Secretary of State 1872; candidate for the Republican nomination for President of the United States 1888; U.S. Senator from New York 1899–1911. Cousin of Charles H. Delavan.

== The Dellets, Gibbons, and Torreys ==
- James Dellet (1788–1848), Alabama State Representative, candidate for U.S. Representative from Alabama 1833, U.S. Representative from Alabama 1839–41 1843–45. Father-in-law of Lyman Gibbons.
  - Lyman Gibbons (1808–1879), Circuit Court Judge in Alabama 1851–52, Justice of the Alabama Supreme Court 1852–54. Son-in-law of James Dellet.
    - Charles John Torrey (1850–1917), Alabama State Representative. Son-in-law of Lyman Gibbons.

NOTE: Charles John Torrey was also son of Alabama legislator Rufus Campbell Torrey, brother-in-law of Mobile, Alabama Mayor Harry Pillans, and cousin by marriage of Alabama State Representative Harry Theophilus Toulmin.

== The Demings of Florida ==
- Jerry Demings (born 1959), Chief of the Orlando Police Department 1998–2002; 28th Sheriff of Orange County, Florida 2009–2018; 5th Mayor of Orange County 2018–present. Husband of Val Demings.
- Val Demings (born 1957), Chief of the Orlando Police Department 2007–2011; U.S. Representative from Florida 2017–2023; Democratic nominee for the United States Senate in Florida in the 2022 election. First Lady of Orange County 2018–present. Wife of Jerry Demings.

== The Demings and Hawthornes ==
- Nathaniel Hawthorne (1804–1864), U.S. Consul in Liverpool, England 1853–57. Great-grandfather of Olcott Deming.
  - Olcott Deming (1909–2007), U.S. Ambassador to Uganda 1963–66. Great-grandson of Nathaniel Hawthorne.
    - Rust Macpherson Deming (born 1941), acting U.S. Ambassador to Japan 1996–97, U.S. Ambassador to Tunisia 2001–03. Son of Olcott Deming.

== The Denbys ==
- Graham N. Fitch (1809–1892), Indiana State Representative 1836 1839, U.S. Representative from Indiana 1849–53, U.S. Senator from Indiana 1857–61. Father-in-law of Charles Harvey Denby.
  - Charles Harvey Denby (1830–1904), Indiana State Representative 1856–57, U.S. Ambassador to China 1885–98, member of the Schurman Commission 1899–1900. Son-in-law of Graham N. Finch.
    - Charles Denby Jr. (1861–1938), U.S. Consul General to Shanghai, China 1907–09; U.S. Consul General to Vienna, Austria 1909–15. Son of Charles Harvey Denby.
    - Edwin C. Denby (1870–1929), Michigan State Representative 1903, U.S. Representative from Michigan 1905–11, U.S. Secretary of the Navy 1821–24. Son of Charles Harvey Denby.

NOTE: Graham N. Fitch was also brother-in-law of Michigan State Senator Henry J. Alvord.

== The Denisons ==
- George Denison (1790–1831), Wilkes-Barre, Pennsylvania Councilman; Pennsylvania State Representative; U.S. Representative from Pennsylvania 1819–23; Burgess of Wilkes-Barre, Pennsylvania 1829–30. Uncle of Charles Denison.
  - Charles Denison (1818–1867), U.S. Representative from Pennsylvania 1863–67. Nephew of George Denison.

== The Denissens ==
- Matt Denissen, Supervisor of Bellevue, Wisconsin. Father of Roman Denissen.
  - Roman Denissen (1918–2008), Green Bay, Wisconsin Councilman; Mayor of Green Bay, Wisconsin 1959–65. Son of Matt Denissen.

== The Dennis and Whites ==
- John Dennis (1771–1806), Maryland House Delegate, U.S. Representative from Maryland 1797–1805. Father of John Dennis.
  - John Dennis (1807–1859), Maryland House Delegate, U.S. Representative from Maryland 1837–41, delegate to the Maryland Constitutional Convention 1850. Son of John Dennis.
  - Littleton Purnell Dennis (1786–1834), Maryland House Delegate 1815–16 1819–27, Maryland Executive Councilman 1829, U.S. Representative from Maryland 1833–34. Nephew of John Dennis.
    - Edward White, Maryland House Delegate 1880 1886. Great-great-great-grandson of John Dennis.
    - King V. White, Orphan's Court Judge in Maryland, Maryland House Delegate 1882. Great-great-great-grandson of John Dennis.
      - John Edward White, Maryland House Delegate 1898. Son of Edward White.
      - A. Percy White, Maryland House Delegate 1927–30. Son of King V. White.
      - Wallace H. White, Maryland State Senator 1947–50. Son of King V. White.
        - E. Homer White Jr. (1911–1998), Maryland House Delegate 1947–69, Maryland State Senator 1975–78. Nephew of A. Percy White and Wallace H. White.

== The Dennisons ==
- William Dennsion (1815–1882), Ohio State Senator, Governor of Ohio 1860–62, Chairman of the Republican National Convention 1864, U.S. Postmaster General 1864–66, Columbus, Ohio Councilman; President of the Board of Commissioners for the District of Columbia 1874–78. Father of William Neil Dennison.
  - William Neil Dennison (1841–1904), candidate for Mayor of Columbus, Ohio 1879; District Attorney for Colorado. Son of William Dennison.
    - E. Haldeman Dennison, U.S. Consul in Rimouski, Quebec 1903–06; U.S. Consul in Bombay, India 1906–11; U.S. Consul in Dundee, Scotland 1911–14; U.S. Consul General in Christiania, Norway 1916–17; U.S. Consul in Quebec City, Quebec 1920–29. Son of William Neil Dennison.

== The Dennys ==
- Ebenezer Denny (1761–1822), Mayor of Pittsburgh, Pennsylvania 1816–17. Father of Harmar Denny.
  - Harmar Denny (1794–1852), Pennsylvania State Representative 1824–29, U.S. Representative from Pennsylvania 1829–37, delegate to the Pennsylvania Constitutional Convention 1837. Son of Ebenezer Denny.
    - Harmar D. Denny Jr. (1886–1966), candidate for Mayor of Pittsburgh, Pennsylvania 1941; U.S. Representative from Pennsylvania 1951–53. Great-grandson of Harmar Denny.

== The Dennys of Illinois and Washington ==
- John Denny (1793–1875), Illinois State Representative 1840–42. Father of Arthur A. Denny and David Denny.
  - Arthur A. Denny (1822–1899), Washington Territory Representative 1853–61, Washington Territory Councilman 1862–63, U.S. Congressional Delegate from Washington Territory 1865–67. Son of John Denny.
  - David Denny (1832–1903), Seattle City Council member, King County commissioner, Seattle School Board member, probate judge. Son of John Denny.

== The Densons ==
- William H. Beatty (1838–1914), District Court Judge in Nevada 1864–74, Justice of the Nevada Supreme Court 1875–78, Chief Justice of the Nevada Supreme Court 1879–80, Chief Justice of the California Supreme Court 1888–1914. Brother-in-law of Samuel Crawford Denson.
- Samuel Crawford Denson (1839–1917), District Court Judge in California 1876–81, Superior Court Judge in California 1881–83, Nevada State Representative 1885–86, District Attorney of Ormsby County, Nevada 1886–88. Brother-in-law of William H. Beatty.
- William Henry Denson (1846–1906), Alabama State Representative 1876, U.S. Attorney in Alabama 1885–89, U.S. Representative from Alabama 1893–95. Fourth cousin once removed of Samuel Crawford Denson.
- N. D. Denson (1856–1927), Alabama State Senator 1884–88, Circuit Court Judge in Alabama 1892–1904, Justice of the Alabama Supreme Court 1904–09, delegate to the Democratic National Convention 1916. Fourth cousin once removed of Samuel Crawford Denson.
  - John Vernon Denson II, delegate to the Republican National Convention 1972. Grandson of N. D. Denson.

== The Dentons ==
- George K. Denton (1864–1926), U.S. Representative from Indiana 1917–19, candidate for Justice of the Indiana Supreme Court 1924, candidate for Democratic nomination for U.S. Senate from Indiana 1926, died during campaign. Father of Winfield K. Denton.
  - Winfield K. Denton (1896–1971), Prosecuting Attorney of Vanderburgh County, Indiana 1932–36; member of the Indiana Legislature 1937–42; U.S. Representative from Indiana 1949–53 1955–66; delegate to the Democratic National Convention 1952 1956 1960 1964. Son of George K. Denton.

== The Denvers ==
- James W. Denver (1817–1892), California State Senator 1851, California Secretary of State 1853–55, U.S. Representative from California 1855–57, Governor of Kansas Territory 1857–58. Father of Matthew R. Denver.
  - Matthew R. Denver (1870–1954), delegate to the Democratic National Convention 1896 1908 1912 1920 1924 1928 1930 1936, Ohio Democratic Committeeman 1896–1908 1926–28, U.S. Representative from Ohio 1907–13. Son of James W. Denver.

== The DeSaulniers ==
- Edward DeSaulnier (1921–1989), Massachusetts State Representative 1949–1957, Massachusetts State Senator 1957–1958, Massachusetts Superior Court Judge 1958–1972. Father of Mark DeSaulnier.
  - Mark DeSaulnier (born 1952), Concord, California Councilman; Mayor of Concord, California; Contra Costa County, California Supervisor 1994–2006; California State Assemblyman 2006–2008; California State Senator 2008–2015; U.S. Representative from California 2015–present. Son of Edward DeSaulnier.

== The Deshas ==
- Joseph Desha (1768–1842), Kentucky State Representative 1797 1799–1802, Kentucky State Senator 1803–07, U.S. Representative from Kentucky 1807–19, candidate for Governor of Kentucky 1820, Governor of Kentucky 1824–28. Brother of Robert Desha.
  - Mary Desha (1850–1911), co-founder of the Daughters of the American Revolution and copyist for the Office of Indian Affairs. Granddaughter of Joseph Desha.
- Robert Desha (1791–1849), U.S. Representative from Tennessee 1827–31. Brother of Joseph Desha.

== The Desnoyers ==
- Peter Desnoyers (1800–1880), Treasurer of Michigan, 1838–40. Brother of Francis X. Desnoyers.
- Francis X. Desnoyers (1813–1868), Mayor of Green Bay, Wisconsin 1855. Father of Frank B. Desnoyers and brother of Peter Desnoyers.
- Frank B. Desnoyers (1859–1945), Mayor of Green Bay, Wisconsin 1896–98; Green Bay, Wisconsin Councilman; Treasurer of Brown County, Wisconsin 1909–13. Son of Francis X. Desnoyers.

NOTE: Frank B. Desnoyers was also son-in-law of Wisconsin State Senator M. P. Lindsley.

== The Devers ==
- William Emmett Dever (1862–1929), Mayor of Chicago, Illinois 1923–27; delegate to the Democratic National Convention 1924 1928. Cousin of Paul A. Dever.
- Paul A. Dever (1903–1958), Massachusetts State Representative 1928–34, Attorney General of Massachusetts 1935–41, delegate to the Democratic National Convention 1940 1952 1956, candidate for Governor of Massachusetts 1940, Governor of Massachusetts 1949–53. Cousin of William Emmett Dever.

== The Devines and Millers ==
- Samuel L. Devine (1915–1997), Ohio State Representative 1951–55; Prosecuting Attorney for Franklin County, Ohio, from 1955 to 1958; U.S. Representative from Ohio 1959–81. Father of Carol Miller.
  - Carol Miller (born 1950), West Virginia Delegate 2007–2019; U.S. Representative from West Virginia 2019–present. Daughter of Samuel L. Devine.

== The Dewarts ==
- Lewis Dewart (1780–1852), Postmaster of Sunbury, Pennsylvania 1806–16; Pennsylvania State Representative 1812–20 1835–40; Pennsylvania State Senator; U.S. Representative from Pennsylvania 1831–33; Chief Burgess of Sunbury, Pennsylvania; member of the Sunbury, Pennsylvania School Board; candidate for Democratic nomination for Governor of Pennsylvania 1840. Father of William Lewis Dewart.
  - William Lewis Dewart (1821–1888), Chief Burgess of Sunbury, Pennsylvania 1845–46; President of the Sunbury, Pennsylvania School Board; delegate to the Democratic National Convention 1852 1856 1860 1884; candidate for U.S. Representative from Pennsylvania 1854; U.S. Representative from Pennsylvania 1857–59. Son of Lewis Dewart.

== The Deweys ==
- Edmund O. Dewey, delegate to the Republican National Convention 1908. Uncle of Thomas E. Dewey.
  - Thomas Dewey (1902–1971), U.S. Attorney in New York 1933, District Attorney of New York County, New York 1937–41; candidate for Governor of New York 1938; candidate for Republican nomination for President of the United States 1940; Governor of New York 1943–55; candidate for President of the United States 1944 1948; delegate to the Republican National Convention 1952 1956. Nephew of Edmund O. Dewey.

NOTE: Thomas Dewey was also grandnephew-in-law of U.S. Secretary of War Jefferson Davis.

== The DeWines ==
- R. Michael DeWine (born 1947), Prosecutor of Greene County 1977–81, Ohio State Senator 1981–82, U.S. Representative from Ohio, 1983–91; lieutenant governor of Ohio, 1991–94; U.S. senator from Ohio, 1995–2007, Attorney General of Ohio 2011–19, Governor of Ohio 2019–present
  - R. Patrick DeWine (born 1968), Cincinnati, Ohio, city councilman 1999–2004, Hamilton County Commissioner, Judge of the Hamilton County Court of Common Pleas 2009–13, Judge of Ohio's 1st District Court of Appeals 2013–16, Associate Justice of the Ohio Supreme Court 2017–present; son of Mike DeWine.
- Kevin DeWine (born 1967), Ohio state representative 2001–2009; Chairman of the Ohio Republican Party; second cousin of Mike DeWine.

== The De Witts ==
- Charles De Witt (1727–1787), New York Colony 1768–76, Delegate to the Continental Provisional Congress from New York Colony, Delegate to the Continental Congress from New York 1784, New York Assemblyman. Grandfather of Charles G. De Witt.
  - Charles G. De Witt (1789–1839), U.S. Representative from New York 1829–31, U.S. Chargé d'Affaires to Central America 1833–39. Grandson of Charles De Witt.

== The Dexters ==
- Samuel Dexter (1761–1816), Massachusetts State Representative 1788, U.S. Representative from Massachusetts 1793–95, U.S. Senator from Massachusetts 1799–1800, U.S. Secretary of War 1800, U.S. Secretary of the Treasury 1801. Father of Samuel W. Dexter.
  - Samuel W. Dexter (1792–1863), Judge of Washtenaw County, Michigan 1826–27; candidate for U.S. Congressional Delegate from the Michigan Territory 1831. Son of Samuel Dexter.

== The Díaz-Balarts ==
- Lincoln Díaz-Balart (born 1954), U.S. Representative from Florida 1993–2011. Brother of Mario Díaz-Balart.
- Mario Díaz-Balart (born 1961), U.S. Representative from Florida 2003–present. Brother of Lincoln Díaz-Balart.

NOTE: Lincoln Díaz-Balart and Mario Díaz-Balart are also sons of Cuban politician Rafael Díaz-Balart and former nephews by marriage of Cuban President Fidel Castro.

== The DiCarlos ==
- Dominick L. DiCarlo (1928–1999), Member of New York State Assembly 1965–81, The United States Assistant Secretary of State for International Narcotics and Law Enforcement Affairs 1981–84, Judge at United States Court of International Trade 1984–99 (Chief Judge 1991–96, Senior Judge 1996–99). Assistant United States Attorney for the Eastern District of New York 1959–62, Council to the Minority Leader of the New York City Council 1962–65, Father of Robert DiCarlo.
  - Robert DiCarlo Member of New York State Senate 1993–96, Candidate for Supervisor of Town of Brookhaven, New York 2007, Candidate for New York State Senate 2000. Son of Dominick DiCarlo.

== The Dicks ==
- John Dick (1794–1872), U.S. Representative from Pennsylvania 1853–55. Father of Samuel Bernard Dick.
  - Samuel Bernard Dick (1836–1907), Mayor of Meadville, Pennsylvania 1870; U.S. Representative from Pennsylvania 1879–81; delegate to the Republican National Convention 1900. Son of John Dick.

== The Dickersons ==
- Mahlon Dickerson (1770–1853), New Jersey Assemblyman 1811, Governor of New Jersey 1815–17, U.S. Senator from New Jersey 1817–33, U.S. Secretary of the Navy 1834–38, U.S. District Judge for New Jersey, delegate to the New Jersey Constitutional Convention 1844. Brother of Philemon Dickerson.
- Philemon Dickerson (1788–1862), New Jersey Assemblyman 1821–22, U.S. Representative from New Jersey 1833–36 1839–41, Governor of New Jersey 1836–37, U.S. District Judge for New Jersey. Brother of Mahlon Dickerson.

== The Dickersons of Nevada ==
- Denver Sylvester Dickerson (1872–1925), Lieutenant Governor of Nevada 1907–10, Governor of Nevada 1908–11, Superintendent of Federal Prisons 1919–21. Father of Harvey, Denver and George M. Dickerson.
  - Denver Dickerson (1914–1981), Member of the Nevada Assembly 1941–43, Speaker of the Nevada Assembly 1943, Secretary of Guam 1963–69, Son of Denver S. Dickerson.
  - George M. Dickerson, District Attorney of Clark County, Nevada 1955–59, President of the State Bar of Nevada 1973–74. Son of Denver S. Dickerson.
    - Robert P. Dickerson, President of the State Bar of Nevada 1998–99. Son of George M. Dickerson.
  - Harvey Dickerson, President of the State Bar of Nevada 1951–52, Delegate to the Democratic National Convention 1952, Attorney General of Nevada 1955–58 1963–70, candidate for U.S. Senate from Nevada 1956, candidate for Governor of Nevada 1958. Son of Denver S. Dickerson.

== The Dickinsons and Murfrees ==
- William Hardy Murfree (1781–1827), member of the North Carolina Legislature, U.S. Representative from North Carolina 1813–17. Uncle of David W. Dickinson.
  - David W. Dickinson (1808–1845), U.S. Representative from Tennessee 1833–35 1843–45. Nephew of William Hardy Murfree.

== The Dickinsons and Norris ==
- Thomas Lloyd (1640–1694), Pennsylvania Colony Councilman, Lieutenant Governor of Pennsylvania Colony 1690–93. Father-in-law of Isaac Norris.
  - Isaac Norris (1671–1735), Pennsylvania Colony Governor's Councilman, Pennsylvania Colony Assemblyman, Justice in Philadelphia County, Pennsylvania 1717; Master of the High Court of Chancery in Pennsylvania Colony; Mayor of Philadelphia, Pennsylvania 1724–25. Son-in-law of Thomas Lloyd.
  - James Logan (1674–1751), Commissioner of Property in Pennsylvania Colony 1701, Pennsylvania Colony Councilman 1703, Mayor of Philadelphia, Pennsylvania 1722–23; Chief Justice of Pennsylvania Colony 1731–39; acting Governor of Pennsylvania Colony 1736–38. Father-in-law of Isaac Norris.
    - Isaac Norris (1701–1766), Philadelphia, Pennsylvania Councilman; Philadelphia, Pennsylvania Alderman; Pennsylvania Colony Assemblyman. Son of Isaac Norris.
      - John Dickinson (1732–1808), Pennsylvania Colony Assemblyman 1759–61 1762–64, Delegate to the Continental Congress from Pennsylvania 1774 1775–76 1779–81, Delaware Councilman 1781–82, President of Delaware 1781–82, President of Pennsylvania 1782–85, delegate to the Delaware Constitutional Convention 1791–92, Delaware State Senator 1793–94. Son-in-law of Isaac Norris.
      - Philemon Dickinson (1739–1809), delegate to the Continental Congress from Delaware 1782–83, U.S. Senator from New Jersey 1790–93. Brother of John Dickinson.

== The Dickinsons and Letts ==
- Lester J. Dickinson (1873–1968), Clerk of Algona, Iowa 1900–04; Prosecuting Attorney of Kossuth County, Iowa 1909–13; U.S. Representative from Iowa 1919–31; U.S. Senator from Iowa 1931–37; candidate for U.S. Senate from Iowa 1938. Cousin of F. Dickinson Letts.
- F. Dickinson Letts (1875–1965), Judge in Iowa 1911–12 1914–25, U.S. Representative from Iowa 1925–31, Justice of the District of Columbia Supreme Court 1931–61. Cousin of Lester J. Dickinson.

== The Dickeys ==
- John Dickey (1794–1853), Postmaster of Old Brighton, Pennsylvania 1818–21; Sheriff of Beaver County, Pennsylvania 1824–27; Pennsylvania State Senator 1835 1837; U.S. Representative from Pennsylvania 1843–45 1847–49; U.S. Marshal in Pennsylvania. Father of Oliver James Dickey.
  - Oliver James Dickey (1823–1876), U.S. Representative from Pennsylvania 1868–73, delegate to the Pennsylvania Constitutional Convention 1873. Son of John Dickey.

== The Dicksons ==
- William Dickson (1770–1816), Tennessee State Representative 1799–1803, U.S. Representative from Tennessee 1801–07. Cousin of Molton Dickson.
- Molton Dickson (1775–1835), Tennessee State Representative 1823–25. Cousin of William Dickson.

== The Dicksons and Whites ==
- Andrew Dickson, New York Assemblyman 1832. Grandfather of Andrew D. White.
  - Andrew D. White (1832–1918), New York State Senator 1864–67, U.S. Minister to Germany 1889–91, delegate to the Republican National Convention 1884 1912, U.S. Minister to Russia 1892–94, U.S. Ambassador to Germany 1897–1902. Grandson of Andrew Dickson.
    - Horace White (1865–1943), New York State Senator 1896–1908, Lieutenant Governor of New York 1909–10, Governor of New York 1910. Nephew of Horace White.

== The Dies ==
- Martin Dies Sr. (1870–1922), Marshal of Freestone County, Texas; Judge of Tyler County, Texas 1894; District Attorney in Texas 1898–1900; U.S. Representative from Texas 1909–19. Father of Martin Dies Jr.
  - Martin Dies Jr. (1900–1972), District Court Judge in Texas, U.S. Representative from Texas 1931–45 1953–59, candidate for U.S. Senate from Texas 1941 1957. Son of Martin Dies Sr.

== The Diggses ==
- Charles C. Diggs Sr. (1894–1967), Michigan State Senator 1937–44, delegate to the Democratic National Convention 1940, candidate for the Republican nomination for U.S. Representative from Michigan 1948, candidate for the Democratic nomination for U.S. Representative from Michigan 1952. Father of Charles Diggs.
  - Charles Diggs (1922–1998), Michigan State Senator 1951–54, U.S. Representative from Michigan 1955–80, delegate to the Democratic National Convention 1956 1960 1964. Son of Charles C. Diggs Sr.
  - Anna Diggs Taylor (born 1932), U.S. District Court Judge in Michigan 1979–present. Former wife of Charles Diggs.

== The Dillinghams ==
- Paul Dillingham (1799–1891), Justice of the Peace in Vermont 1826–44, Clerk of Waterbury, Vermont 1829–44; Vermont State Representative 1833–35 1837–40; Prosecuting Attorney of Washington County, Vermont 1835–38; delegate to the Vermont Constitutional Convention 1836 1857 1870; Vermont State Senator 1841–42 1861; U.S. Representative from Vermont 1843–47; Lieutenant Governor of Vermont 1862–65; Governor of Vermont 1865–66. Father of William P. Dillingham and Frank Dillingham.
  - William P. Dillingham (1843–1923), Prosecuting Attorney of Washington County, Vermont 1872–76; Vermont State Representative 1876 1884; Vermont State Senator 1878 1880; Governor of Vermont 1888–90; U.S. Senator from Vermont 1900–23. Son of Paul Dillingham.
  - Frank Dillingham, U.S. Consul in Auckland, New Zealand 1897–1903; U.S. Consul in Aix-la-Chapelle, Germany 1905–06; U.S. Consul General in Auckland, New Zealand 1903–05; U.S. Consul General in Coburg, Germany 1906–12; U.S. Consul General in Winnipeg, Manitoba 1914. Son of Paul Dillingham.

== The Dimmicks ==
- Dan Dimmick (1775–1825) lawyer, brother of Alpheus, father of Oliver S., Milo Melankthon, and William Harrison.
  - Oliver S. Dimmick (1804–1877), Pennsylvania representative, 1837–9, older brother of Milo Melankthon and William Harrison
  - Milo Melankthon Dimmick (1811–1872), U.S. Representative from Pennsylvania 1849–53, candidate for President Judge in Pennsylvania 1853. Brother of William Harrison Dimmick.
  - William Harrison Dimmick (1815–1861), Prosecuting Attorney of Wayne County, Pennsylvania 1836–37; Pennsylvania State Senator 1845–47; U.S. Representative from Pennsylvania 1857–61. Brother of Milo Melankthon Dimmick.
- Alpheus Dimmick (1787–1865), lawyer, judge, member of New York legislature in 1826, brother of Dan, father of Samuel Erskine
  - Samuel E. Dimmick (1822–1875), Pennsylvania Attorney General 1873–75. Son of Alpheus, father of Joseph Benjamin. (Samuel and his cousin William Harrison were also law partners, and opponents in the 1856 House election.)
    - J. Benjamin Dimmick (1858–1920), Mayor of Scranton, Pennsylvania 1906–09, son of Samuel E. Dimmick.

Note: These Dimmicks are descended from William Bradford (Plymouth Colony governor).
Note: The strict paternal Dimmick line goes back to Thomas Dimmick, in Massachusetts by 1635, later an Elder of Barnstable, Massachusetts. They descend from the British Dymoke family of hereditary King's Champions. Note: Samuel's oldest son Walter Erskine Dimmick married Mary Scott Lord, but he died three months later, without issue. The widow later married Benjamin Harrison, after his presidency.

== The Dingells ==
- John D. Dingell Sr. (1894–1955), U.S. representative from Michigan, 1933–55.
  - John D. Dingell Jr. (1926–2019), U.S. representative from Michigan, 1955–2015; son of John Sr.
  - Deborah Dingell (born 1954), delegate to the Democratic National Convention 1996 2000 2004; U.S. Representative from Michigan 2015–present. Wife of John Dingell Jr.
    - Christopher D. Dingell (born 1957), Michigan state senator, 1998–2002; Michigan circuit court judge. Son of John Jr.

== The Dinklas, Douglases, and Johnsons ==
- Dwight Dinkla (born 1951), member of the Iowa House of Representatives (1993–99). Brother of Jo Ann Johnson.
- Jo Ann Johnson (born 1949), member of the Iowa Senate (1995–2002), first elected as Jo Ann Douglas. Sister of Dwight Dinkla.

== The Dinsmoors ==
- Samuel Dinsmoor (1766–1835), U.S. Representative from New Hampshire 1811–13, member of the New Hampshire Governor's Council 1821, New Hampshire State Court Judge 1823–31, Governor of New Hampshire 1831–34. Father of Samuel Dinsmoor Jr.
  - Samuel Dinsmoor Jr. (1799–1869), Governor of New Hampshire 1849–52. Son of Samuel Dinsmoor.

== The Dixes and Morgans ==
- John J. Morgan (1770–1849), New York Assemblyman 1819 1836–40, U.S. Representative from New York 1821–25 1834–35. Father-in-law of John Adams Dix.
  - John Adams Dix (1798–1879), New York Secretary of State 1833–39, U.S. Senator from New York 1845–49, U.S. Secretary of the Treasury 1861, U.S. Minister to France 1866–69, Governor of New York 1873–74. Son-in-law of John J. Morgan.
    - John Alden Dix (1860–1928), delegate to the Democratic National Convention 1904 1912, candidate for Lieutenant Governor of New York 1908, Chairman of the New York Democratic Party 1910, Governor of New York 1911–12. Nephew of John Adams Dix.

== The Dixons ==
- Nathan F. Dixon (1774–1842), Rhode Island State Representative 1813–30, U.S. Senator from Rhode Island 1839–42. Father of Nathan F. Dixon II.
  - Nathan F. Dixon II (1812–1881), member of the Rhode Island Legislature, U.S. Representative from Rhode Island 1849–51 1863–71. Son of Nathan F. Dixon.
    - Nathan F. Dixon III (1847–1897), U.S. Representative from Rhode Island 1885, U.S. Senator from Rhode Island 1889–95. Son of Nathan F. Dixon II.

== The Dobbs and Jacksons ==
- J.W. Dobbs (1882–1961), delegate to the Republican National Convention 1948 1952. Grandfather of Maynard Jackson.
  - Maynard Jackson (1938–2003), candidate for the Democratic nomination for U.S. Senate from Georgia 1968, Mayor of Atlanta, Georgia 1974–82 1990–94; delegate to the Democratic National Convention 1976 1980 2000, Democratic National Committeeman 1993. Grandson of J.W. Dobbs.

== The Dockerys ==
- Alfred Dockery (1797–1875), member of the North Carolina House of Commons 1822, delegate to the North Carolina Constitutional Convention 1835, North Carolina State Senator 1836–44, U.S. Representative from North Carolina 1845–47 1851–53, candidate for Governor of North Carolina 1854 1866. Father of Oliver H. Dockery.
  - Oliver H. Dockery (1830–1906), North Carolina State Representative 1858–59, U.S. Representative from North Carolina 1868–71, delegate to the North Carolina Constitutional Convention 1875, candidate for Governor of North Carolina 1888, U.S. Consul General to Rio de Janeiro, Brazil 1889–93. Son of Alfred Dockery.

== The Dockings ==
- George Docking (1904–1964), Governor of Kansas 1957–61. Father of Robert Docking.
  - Robert Docking (1925–1983), Governor of Kansas 1967–75. Son of George Docking.
    - Thomas Docking (1954–2017), Lieutenant Governor of Kansas 1983–87, candidate for Governor of Kansas 1988. Son of Robert Docking.
    - Jill Docking, candidate for U.S. Senate from Kansas 1996. Wife of Thomas R. Docking.

== The Dockweilers ==
- Heinrich Dockweiler (1824–1887), Los Angeles Common Councilman 1870–74. Father of Isidore B. Dockweiler.
  - Isidore B. Dockweiler (1867–1947), candidate for Lieutenant Governor of California 1902, delegate to the Democratic National Convention 1908 1936 1940 1944, Democratic National Committeeman 1916–32, candidate for U.S. Senate from California 1926. Father of John F. Dockweiler and Henry I. Dockweiler.
    - John F. Dockweiler (1895–1943), U.S. Representative from California 1933–39, candidate for the Democratic nomination for Governor of California 1938, District Attorney of Los Angeles County, California 1940–43. Son of Isidore B. Dockweiler.
    - Henry I. Dockweiler, delegate to the Democratic National Convention 1948. Son of Isidore B. Dockweiler.

== The Dodds ==
- Thomas Joseph Dodd (1870–1953), delegate to the Democratic National Convention 1936. Father of Thomas J. Dodd.
  - Thomas J. Dodd, US Representative 1953–57 and US Senator 1959–1971 from Connecticut
    - Christopher Dodd, his son, US Representative from Connecticut (1975–1981), US Senator from Connecticut (1981–2011). Democratic candidate for U.S. President 2008.

== The Dodds of Michigan and Tennessee ==
- Peter F. Dodds, Prosecuting Attorney of Isabella County, Michigan 1881–82; Circuit Court Judge in Michigan 1894–1917. Brother of Francis H. Dodds.
- Francis H. Dodds (1858–1940), U.S. Representative from Michigan 1909–13. Brother of Peter F. Dodds.
  - Nugent Dodds, U.S. Attorney in Tennessee 1926. Son of Peter F. Dodds.

== The Dodges ==
- Henry Dodge (1782–1867), Governor of Wisconsin Territory 1836–41 1845–48, U.S. Congressional Delegate from Wisconsin Territory 1841–45, U.S. Senator from Wisconsin 1848–57. Brother of Lewis F. Linn.
- Lewis F. Linn (1795–1843), U.S. Senator from Missouri 1833–43. Half-brother of Henry Dodge.
- James Hugh Relfe (1791–1863), Missouri State Representative 1835–44, U.S. Representative from Missouri 1843–47. Brother-in-law of Lewis F. Linn.
  - Augustus C. Dodge (1812–1883), U.S. Congressional Delegate from Iowa Territory 1840–46, U.S. Senator from Iowa 1847–55, U.S. Minister to Spain 1855–59, candidate for Governor of Iowa 1859. Son of Henry Dodge.
  - James Clarke (1812–1850), Secretary of Iowa Territory 1839–41, Mayor of Burlington, Iowa 1844–45; delegate to the Iowa Territory Constitutional Convention 1844; Governor of Iowa Territory 1845–46. Son-in-law of Henry Dodge.
    - Lewis Linn McArthur (1843–1897), Justice of the Oregon Supreme Court 1870–78, Circuit Court Judge in Oregon 1883–86, U.S. Attorney for Oregon 1886–90. Grandnephew of Lewis F. Linn.
      - Clifton N. McArthur (1879–1923), Oregon State Representative 1909–13, U.S. Representative from Oregon 1915–23. Son of Lewis Linn McArthur.

NOTE: Clifton N. McArthur was also grandson of U.S. Senator James W. Nesmith.

== The Doles ==
- Bob Dole (1923–2021), U.S. Representative from Kansas, 1961–69; U.S. Senator from Kansas, 1969–96; Chairman of Republican National Committee, 1971–73; Republican nominee for vice president, 1976; candidate for Republican nomination for president, 1980 and 1988; Republican nominee for president, 1996.
- Elizabeth Dole (born 1936), U.S. Secretary of Transportation, 1983–87; U.S. Secretary of Labor, 1989–91; candidate for Republican nomination for president, 2000; U.S. Senator from North Carolina, 2003–09; wife of Bob Dole.

== The Dollivers ==
- Jonathan Prentiss Dolliver (1858–1910), U.S. Senator from Iowa, 1900–10.
  - James Isaac Dolliver (1894–1978), U.S. Representative from Iowa's 6th congressional district, 1945–56. Nephew of Jonathan Prentiss Dolliver.

NOTE: Jonathan Prentiss Dolliver was also cousin of U.S. Representative William G. Brown Jr.

== The Dolphs and Mulkeys ==
- Joseph N. Dolph (1835–1897), Attorney of Portland, Oregon 1864–65; U.S. District Attorney in Oregon 1865–68; Oregon State Senator 1866 1868 1872 1874; U.S. Senator from Oregon 1883–95. Uncle of Frederick W. Mulkey.
  - Frederick W. Mulkey (1874–1924), Portland, Oregon Councilman 1900–02; U.S. Senator from Oregon 1907 1918. Nephew of Joseph N. Dolph.

== The Dominicks and Smiths ==
- Howard Alexander Smith (1880–1966), Chairman of the New Jersey Republican Party 1941–43, delegate to the Republican National Convention 1948 1956, Republican National Committeeman 1942–43, U.S. Senator from New Jersey 1944–59. Uncle of Peter H. Dominick.
  - Peter H. Dominick (1915–1981), Colorado State Representative 1957–61, U.S. Representative from Colorado 1961–63, U.S. Senator from Colorado 1963–75, delegate to the Republican National Convention 1964 1972, U.S. Ambassador to Switzerland 1975. Nephew of Howard Alexander Smith.

== The Donaheys ==
- A. Victor Donahey (1873–1946), Auditor of Tuscarawas County, Ohio 1905–09; delegate to the Ohio Constitutional Convention 1912; Auditor of Ohio 1913–21; candidate for Governor of Ohio 1920; Governor of Ohio 1923–29; U.S. Senator from Ohio 1935–41. Father of John W. Donahey.
  - John W. Donahey, Lieutenant Governor of Ohio 1959–63, delegate to the Democratic National Convention 1960. Son of A. Victor Donahey.
  - Gertrude Walton Donahey (1908–2004), delegate to the Democratic National Convention 1964 1968, Treasurer of Ohio 1971–83. Wife of John W. Donahey.

== The Donderos ==
- Mary Dondero (1894–1960), mayor of Portsmouth, New Hampshire 1945–1947, member of the New Hampshire House of Representatives 1935–1938, 1941–1946, 1949–.
  - Eileen Foley, née Dondero (1918–2016), mayor of Portsmouth, New Hampshire 1968–1971, 1984–1985, 1988–1997, member of the New Hampshire Senate 1965–1978. Daughter of Mary Dondero.
- Ann Sadler, member of the New Hampshire House of Representatives 1953–1958, 1963–1968. Half-sister of Mary Dondero.

== The Donnells ==
- L.A. Donnell (1906–1959), Mayor of Wichita, Kansas 1948–49 1954–55. Father of James M. Donnell.
  - James M. Donnell, Mayor of Wichita, Kansas 1873–1974 1976–77. Son of L.A. Donnell.

== The Doolings ==
- Peter J. Dooling (1857–1931), New York State Senator 1903–05, U.S. Representative from New York 1913–21, New York Democratic Committeeman 1930. Father of James J. Dooling.
  - James J. Dooling (1893–1937), delegate to the Democratic National Convention 1936. Son of Peter J. Dooling.

== The Dorns ==
- T.E. Dorn, School Superintendent of Greenwood County, South Carolina. Father of William Jennings Bryan Dorn.
  - William Jennings Bryan Dorn (1916–2005), South Carolina State Representative 1939–40, South Carolina State Senator 1941–43, U.S. Representative from South Carolina 1947–49 1951–74, candidate for U.S. Senate from South Carolina 1948, candidate for Governor of South Carolina 1974, candidate for the Democratic nomination for South Carolina State Representative 1978, Chairman of the South Carolina Democratic Party 1980–84, Democratic National Committeeman 1980–84. Son of T.E. Dorn.

== The Dornans ==
- Robert K. Dornan (born 1933), candidate for Mayor of Los Angeles 1973; delegate to the Republican National Convention 1976; U.S. Representative from California 1977–83 1985–97; candidate for the Republican nomination for U.S. Senate from California 1982; candidate for the Republican nomination for President of the United States 1996; candidate for U.S. Representative from California 1998. Father of Mark Dornan.
  - Mark Dornan (born 1959), candidate for the Republican nomination for U.S. Representative from California 2000. Son of Robert K. Dornan.

== The Dossetts ==
- J.J. Dossett, Member of the Oklahoma Senate 2016–2022. Brother of Jo Anna Dossett.
- Jo Anna Dossett, Member of the Oklahoma Senate 2021–present. Sister of J.J. Dossett.

== The Dotys and Martins ==
- James D. Doty (1799–1865), Clerk of Court of Michigan Territory, U.S. Judge in Michigan Territory, U.S. Congressional Delegate from Wisconsin Territory 1839–41, Governor of Wisconsin Territory 1841–44, delegate to the Wisconsin Territory Constitutional Convention 1846, U.S. Representative from Wisconsin 1849–53, Treasurer of Utah Territory 1863, Governor of Utah Territory 1863. Cousin of Morgan L. Martin.
- Morgan L. Martin (1805–1887), member of the Michigan Territory Legislature 1831–35, member of the Wisconsin Territory Legislature 1838–44, U.S. Congressional Delegate from Wisconsin Territory 1845–47, Wisconsin Assemblyman 1855, Wisconsin State Senator 1858–59, candidate for U.S. Representative from Wisconsin 1866, Judge of Brown County, Wisconsin 1875–87. Cousin of James D. Doty.
  - Charles Doty, Wisconsin Assemblyman 1848. Son of James D. Doty.

== The Doughtons ==
A political family from rural Alleghany County in the North Carolina mountains, they rose to considerable power in both Congress and the state government of North Carolina.

- Robert Doughton (1863–1954), U.S. Representative from North Carolina, 1911 to 1953. From 1933 to 1947 he was the chairman of the powerful House Ways and Means Committee, which controlled how the federal government spent much of its money. He used his influence as chairman to help create and fund the Blue Ridge Parkway; the largest park on the parkway is named in his honor. He also played a major role in the passage of the Social Security Act.
- Rufus A. Doughton (1857–1946). The older brother of Robert Doughton, he served as Speaker of the North Carolina House of Representatives and as the Lieutenant Governor of North Carolina from 1893 to 1897.
  - James Doughton (1884–1973), North Carolina State Representative 1948–57, Speaker of the North Carolina House of Representatives 1951–57. Son of Rufus A. Doughton.

== The Douglases ==
- James Madison (1751–1836), Delegate to the Continental Congress from Virginia 1780–83, U.S. Representative from Virginia 1789–97, U.S. Secretary of State 1801–09, President of the United States 1809–17. Granduncle by marriage of Stephen A. Douglas.
  - Stephen A. Douglas (1813–1861), Illinois State Attorney 1835, Illinois State Representative 1836–37, Register of the Land Office of Springfield, Illinois 1837; candidate for U.S. Representative from Illinois 1838; Illinois Secretary of State 1840–41; U.S. Senator from Illinois 1847–1961; candidate for President of the United States 1860. Grandnephew of James Madison.
  - Robert P. Dick (1823–1898), Justice of the North Carolina Supreme Court. Father-in-law of Robert M. Douglas.
    - Robert M. Douglas (1849–1917), Justice of the North Carolina Supreme Court 1897–1905. Son of Stephen A. Douglas.
      - Robert Dick Douglas (1875–1960), North Carolina Attorney General. Son of Robert M. Douglas. Grandson of Stephen A. Douglas and Robert P. Dick.

== The Downeys ==
- Stephen Wheeler Downey (1839–1902), Prosecuting Attorney of Albany County, Wyoming 1869–70 1899–1902; Wyoming Territory Councilman; Treasurer of Wyoming Territory 1872–75; Auditor of Wyoming Territory 1877–79; U.S. Congressional Delegate from Wyoming Territory 1879–81; delegate to the Wyoming Constitutional Convention 1889; Wyoming State Representative 1893 1895. Father of Sheridan Downey.
  - Sheridan Downey (1884–1961), U.S. Senator from California 1939–50. Son of Stephen Wheeler Downey.

== The Downeys of New York ==
- Norma Morgillo Downey, delegate to the Democratic National Convention 2000. Mother of Thomas J. Downey.
  - Thomas J. Downey (born 1949), delegate to the Democratic National Convention 1972 1984, member of the New York Legislature 1972–74, U.S. Representative from New York 1975–93. Son of Norma Morgillo Downey.

== The Downhams ==
- E. E. Downham (1839–1921), member of the Alexandria City Council, 1874–1887; Mayor of Alexandria, 1887–1891; President of the Friendship Fire Association, 1903–1921. Cousin of McKendree Downham.
- McKendree Downham (1849–1902), member of the Delaware General Assembly House of Representatives representing Sussex County, 1889–1890; chief of the stationery division, Pension Office, 1890–1893. Cousin of E. E. Downham.

== The Downses ==
- Uriah Thomas Downs (1880–1941), mayor of Pineville, Louisiana, 1914–24; sheriff of Rapides Parish, 1924–40; Democrat, active in the Ku Klux Klan; father of C. H. "Sammy" Downs and J. Earl Downs, grandfather of Jam Downs and James U. Downs
  - Crawford Hugh "Sammy" Downs (1911–1985), member of both houses of the Louisiana State Legislature, House 1944–48 and Senate 1948–52 and 1956–60; advisor to Governors Earl Kemp Long and John McKeithen, former educator and lawyer in Alexandria; son of U. T. Downs, brother of J. Earl Downs, father of Jam Downs, and uncle of James U. Downs
    - James Crawford "Jam" Downs (born 1940), district attorney of the Louisiana 9th Judicial District Court in Rapides Parish, 2000–15, grandson of U. T. Downs, son of Sammy Downs, nephew of J. Earl Downs, and cousin of James U. Downs
  - J. Earl Downs (1905–1998), commissioner of public safety in Shreveport 1954–62, unseated by George W. D'Artois; son of U. T. Downs, brother of C. H. "Sammy" Downs, and uncle of James Crawford "James" Downs
    - James Uriah Downs (born 1941), retired senior resident superior court judge in Franklin, North Carolina, with service from 1983 to 2013; grandson of U. T. Downs, son of J. Earl Downs, nephew of C. H. "Sammy" Downs, and cousin of Jam Downs

== The Doyles and Bachhubers ==
- Max Bachhuber, Wisconsin Assemblyman 1860 1864 1875. Father of Andrew Bachhuber.
  - Andrew Bachhuber, Wisconsin Assemblyman 1885. Son of Max Bachhuber.
    - Frank E. Bachhuber, Wisconsin Assemblyman 1933. Son of Andrew Bachhuber.
      - Ruth Bachhuber Doyle (1916–2006), Wisconsin Assemblywoman 1949–53. Daughter of Frank E. Bachhuber.
      - James Edward Doyle (1915–1987), Chairman of the Wisconsin Democratic Party 1951–53, U.S. District Court Judge in Wisconsin 1965–87. Husband of Ruth Bachhuber Doyle.
        - James E. Doyle Jr. (born 1945), District Attorney of Dane County, Wisconsin 1977–82; Attorney General of Wisconsin 1990–2002; Governor of Wisconsin 2003–11. Son of James Edward Doyle and Ruth Bachhuber Doyle.

NOTE: James E. Doyle Jr. is also nephew by marriage of U.S. Secretary of Defense Melvin R. Laird, great-grandson-in-law of Wisconsin Lieutenant Governor William D. Connor and great-great-grandson-in-law of Wisconsin State Assemblyman Robert Connor.

== The Drapers ==
- William F. Draper (1842–1910), delegate to the Republican National Convention 1876, U.S. Representative from Massachusetts 1893–97, U.S. Ambassador to Italy 1897–1900. Brother of Ebenezer Sumner Draper.
- Ebenezer Sumner Draper (1858–1914), Lieutenant Governor of Massachusetts 1906–09, Governor of Massachusetts 1909–11. Brother of William F. Draper.
  - Eben S. Draper, Massachusetts State Representative 1921–22, Massachusetts State Senator 1923–26, delegate to the Republican National Convention 1928. Son of Ebenezer Sumner Draper.

NOTE: Ebenezer Sumner Draper was also son-in-law of U.S. Secretary of the Treasury Benjamin Bristow and grandson-in-law of U.S. Representative Francis M. Bristow.

== The Draytons ==
- William Drayton Sr. (1733–1790), U.S. District Court Judge of South Carolina 1789–90. Father of William Drayton.
  - William Drayton (1776–1846), South Carolina State Representative 1806–08, U.S. Representative from South Carolina 1825–33. Son of William Drayton Sr.
- William Henry Drayton (1742–1779), delegate for South Carolina to the Continental Congress 1778 1779. Cousin of William Drayton Sr.
  - John Drayton (1766–1822), Lieutenant Governor of South Carolina 1798–1800, Governor of South Carolina 1800–02, Mayor of Charleston, South Carolina 1803–04, Governor of South Carolina 1808–10, Judge of the United States District Court for the District of South Carolina 1812–22. Son of William Henry Drayton.

== The Drews, the Elams, and Careys of Louisiana ==
- Thomas Stevenson Drew (1802–1879), governor of Arkansas 1844–49
- Richard Maxwell Drew (1822–1850), State representative and lawyer in Claiborne Parish, Louisiana; brother of Thomas Stevenson Drew
  - Richard Cleveland Drew Sr. (1848–1919), district based in Minden in Webster Parish (a breakaway in 1871 from Claiborne Parish); judge of the Louisiana 2nd Circuit Court of Appeal based in Shreveport; son of Richard Maxwell Drew
    - Harmon Caldwell Drew (1889–1950), district attorney of Webster and Bossier parishes, district and circuit judge based in Minden and Shreveport; son of Richard Cleveland Drew Sr.
      - R. Harmon Drew Sr. (1917–1995), city and ward judge in Minden, state representative from Webster Parish from 1972 to 1978; son of Harmon Caldwell Drew and brother of Katie Drew Carey and brother-in-law of Harvey Locke Carey
      - Harvey Locke Carey (1915–1984), U.S. attorney of the Western District of Louisiana 1950–52; Shreveport ad hoc city judge, clerk of the Louisiana House of Representatives, oil and gas attorney, brother-in-law of R. Harmon Drew Sr., uncle by marriage of Harmon Drew Jr., and son-in-law of Harmon Caldwell Drew
        - Harmon Drew Jr. (born 1946), former city and district judge; current circuit judge; son of R. Harmon Drew Sr., great-grandson of Joseph Barton Elam Sr., grandson of Joseph Barton Elam Jr., and Harmon Caldwell Drew, great-nephew of Charles Wheaton Elam, uncle by marriage of Harvey Locke Carey, and cousin of Richard Drew Carey
          - Joseph Barton Elam Sr., member and Speaker of the Louisiana House of Representatives during the American Civil War; member of the United States House of Representatives from Louisiana's 4th congressional district 1877–81, maternal great-grandfather of Harmon Drew Jr.
          - Charles Wheaton Elam, member of the Louisiana House of Representatives 1892–96, maternal great-uncle of Harmon Drew Jr.

== Dreyfus ==
- Claire Dreyfus, member of the Milwaukee, Wisconsin School Board. Mother of Lee S. Dreyfus.
  - Lee S. Dreyfus (1926–2008), Governor of Wisconsin 1979–83. Father of Lee S. Dreyfus Jr.
    - Lee S. Dreyfus Jr., Wisconsin Circuit Court Judge. Son of Lee S. Dreyfus.

== Driehaus ==
- H. Donald Driehaus, candidate for U.S. Representative from Ohio 1968, Co-chairman of the Hamilton County, Ohio Democratic Party 1988–91. Father of Steven L. Driehaus and Denise Driehaus.
  - Steven L. Driehaus (born 1966), Ohio State Representative 2001–09, U.S. Representative from Ohio 2009–2011. Son of H. Donald Driehaus.
  - Denise Driehaus, Ohio State Representative 2009–2016. Daughter of H. Donald Driehaus.

== The Dromgooles and Sims ==
- George Dromgoole (1797–1847), Virginia State Representative 1823–26, Virginia State Senator 1826–35, delegate to the Virginia Constitutional Convention 1829, U.S. Representative from Virginia 1835–41 1843–47. Uncle of Alexander D. Sims.
  - Alexander D. Sims (1803–1848), South Carolina State Representative 1840–43, U.S. Representative from South Carolina 1845–48. Nephew of George Dromgoole.

== The Drydens, Kusers, and Marshalls ==
- John F. Dryden (1839–1911), U.S. Senator from New Jersey 1902–07. Grandfather of John Dryden Kuser.
  - John Dryden Kuser (1897–1964), New Jersey Assemblyman, New Jersey State Senator 1829–35. Grandson of John F. Dryden.
    - Anthony Dryden Marshall (born 1924), U.S. Ambassador to Malagasy Republic 1969–71, U.S. Ambassador to Trinidad and Tobago 1972–74, U.S. Ambassador to Kenya 1973, U.S. Ambassador to Seychelles 1976. Son of John Dryden Kuser.

== The Duartes ==
- John Duarte, California congressman
  - Alexandra Duarte, member of the California State Assembly. Wife of John Duarte.

== The Dubinas and Robys ==
- Joel Fredrick Dubina (born 1947), U.S. District Court Judge in Alabama 1986–90, Judge of the U.S. Court of Appeals 1990–2009, Chief Judge of the U.S. Court of Appeals 2009–13. Father of Martha Roby.
  - Martha Roby (born 1976), Montgomery, Alabama Councilwoman 2003–10, U.S. Representative from Alabama 2011–present. Daughter of Joel Fredrick Dubina.

== The Dubois ==
- Jesse K. Dubois, Illinois State Representative 1835–1941 1843–45, Illinois Auditor of Public Accounts 1857–64, delegate to the Republican National Convention 1868. Father of Fred T. Dubois.
  - Fred T. Dubois (1851–1930), U.S. Congressional Delegate from Idaho Territory 1887–90, U.S. Senator from Idaho 1891–97 1901–07, delegate to the Republican National Convention 1892 1896, delegate to the Democratic National Convention 1904. Son of Jesse K. Dubois.

== The Dudley-Winthrop family ==
A political family spanning the country's history. Notable members include:

- Robert Charles Winthrop
- John Winthrop
- Thomas Dudley
- Oliver Wendell Holmes Jr.
- Simon Bradstreet
- John Kerry
- Schuyler Colfax
- Benjamin Franklin Wade
- James Bowdoin
- James Bowdoin III

== The Duells ==
- R. Holland Duell (1824–1891), District Attorney of Cortland County, New York 1850–55; Judge of Cortland County, New York 1855–59; delegate to the Republican National Convention 1856 1868; U.S. Representative from New York 1859–63 1871–75; U.S. Commissioner of Patents 1875–77. Father of Charles H. Duell.
  - Charles H. Duell (1850–1920), New York Assemblyman 1880, U.S. Commissioner of Patents 1898–1901, Associate Justice of the Court of Appeals of the District of Columbia 1905–06. Son of R. Holland Duell.
    - Holland S. Duell (1881–1942), New York Assemblyman 1907 1909, New York State Senator 1921–22. Son of Charles H. Duell.

== The Duhés and Héberts ==
- F. Edward Hébert (1901–1979), U.S. Representative from Louisiana 1941–77.
  - John M. Duhé Jr. (born 1933), Judge of the United States District Court for the Western District of Louisiana 1984–88, Judge of the United States Court of Appeals for the Fifth Circuit 1988–99. Son-in-law of F. Edward Hébert.

== The Dukakises and Chaffetzes ==
- Olympia Dukakis (1931–2021), delegate to the Democratic National Convention 1988. Cousin of Michael Dukakis.
- Michael Dukakis (born 1933), Massachusetts State Representative 1963–71, Governor of Massachusetts 1975–79 1983–91, candidate for President of the United States 1988. Cousin of Olympia Dukakis.
  - Michael Dukakis's stepson, John Dukakis, is the half-brother of Jason Chaffetz, U.S. Representative from Utah 2009–17.

== The Dulleses ==
- John Watson Foster (1836–1917), General, Union Army, Civil War; Ambassador to Mexico, 1873–80; Ambassador to Russia, 1880–81; Ambassador to Spain, 1883–85; United States Secretary of State, 1892–93.
  - John Foster Dulles (1888–1959), U.S. Senator from New York, 1949; Secretary of State, 1953–59; grandson of John Watson Foster. Namesake for the Washington Dulles International Airport
    - Avery Robert Dulles (1918–2008), cardinal of the Roman Catholic Church; son of John Foster and Janet Avery (Pomeroy) Dulles.
  - Allen Welsh Dulles (1893–1969), second Director of Central Intelligence, 1953–61; member, Warren Commission. He was the brother of John Foster and Eleanor Lansing Dulles.
- Robert Lansing (1864–1928), Secretary of State, 1915–20; uncle of John Foster Dulles.
  - Eleanor Lansing Dulles (1895–1996) The sister of Allen and John, organized of the Berlin Desk before the end of World War II, was the U.S. political adviser in Austria and then assisted President Franklin D. Roosevelt in setting up the Social Security system during two decades of service in the United States Department of State.
- Theodore Medad Pomeroy, grandfather of Janet Pomeroy Avery Dulles (wife of John Foster Dulles and mother of Cardinal Avery Dulles), U.S. Representative; Speaker of the United States House of Representatives for one day.

NOTE: Robert Lansing was also son-in-law of U.S. Secretary of State John W. Foster.

== The Duncans ==
- John Duncan Sr. (1919–1988), Mayor of Knoxville, Tennessee 1959–65; U.S. Representative from Tennessee 1965–88. Father of John J. Duncan Jr.
  - John J. Duncan Jr. (born 1947), Tennessee State Judge 1981–88, U.S. Representative from Tennessee 1988–2019. Son of John Duncan Sr.
  - Becky Duncan Massey (born 1955), Tennessee State Senator 2011–present. Daughter of John Duncan Sr.

== The Duns, McCormicks, and Thurmans ==
- Allen G. Thurman (1813–1895), U.S. Representative from Ohio 1845–47, Justice of the Ohio Supreme Court 1851–54, Chief Justice of the Ohio Supreme Court 1854–56, candidate for Governor of Ohio 1867, U.S. Senator from Ohio 1869–81, candidate for Vice President of the United States 1888. Uncle of Edwin Dun.
  - Edwin Dun (1848–1931), U.S. Minister to Japan 1893–97. Nephew of Allen G. Thurman.
  - Richard C. McCormick (1832–1901), Secretary of the Arizona Territory 1863–66, Governor of the Arizona Territory 1866–69, U.S. Congressional Delegate from the Arizona Territory 1869–75, U.S. Representative from New York 1895–97. Son-in-law of Allen G. Thurman.

== The Dunns ==
- Aubert Dunn (1896–1987), U.S. Representative from Mississippi 1935–37, Circuit Court Judge in Mississippi 1966. Father of Winfield Dunn.
  - Winfield Dunn (born 1927), Governor of Tennessee 1971–75, delegate to the Republican National Convention 1972 2004. Son of Aubert Dunn.

== The Dunns of Indiana ==
- Williamson Dunn (1781–1854), Judge of the Jefferson County Common Pleas Court, Judge of the Jefferson County Circuit Court, Speaker of the Indiana House of Representatives (1818–1820), member of the Indiana Senate.
  - William McKee Dunn (1814–1887), member of the Indiana House of Representatives, U.S. Representative from Indiana (1859–1863), Judge Advocate General of the United States Army (1875–1881); son of Williamson.

== The Dunns and Thayers ==
- James Clement Dunn (1890–1979), U.S. Ambassador to Italy 1946–52, U.S. Ambassador to France 1952–53, U.S. Ambassador to Spain 1953–55, U.S. Ambassador to Brazil 1955–56. Father-in-law of Charles W. Thayer.
  - Charles W. Thayer (1910–1969), U.S. Vice Consul in Moscow, Soviet Union 1937 1940; U.S. Vice Consul in Berlin, Germany 1937–38; U.S. Vice Consul in Hamburg, Germany 1939–40; U.S. Vice Consul in Kabul, Afghanistan 1943; U.S. Consul General in Munich, Germany 1952–53. Son-in-law of James Clement Dunn.

== The du Ponts ==
The du Pont immigrant to the United States, Pierre Samuel du Pont de Nemours (1739–1817) was deputy of the Third Estate to the Estates-General of 1789 for the region of Nemours in France. The du Pont political dynasty is based on the family's manufacturing empire in Delaware.

- May Lammot du Pont married Willard Saulsbury U.S. Senator from Delaware (elected 1912).
- Renée de Pelleport du Pont married LeRoy Harvey, mayor of Wilmington, Delaware.
- Ethel du Pont (1916–1965) married Franklin Delano Roosevelt Jr.
- Henry Algernon du Pont (1838–1926), Colonel in Union Army during Civil War; U.S. Senator from Delaware, 1906–17.
- T. Coleman du Pont (1863–1930), U.S. Senator from Delaware, 1921–22 and 1925–28; candidate for Republican nomination for president, 1916; cousin of Henry A. du Pont.
- Pierre S. du Pont, IV (born 1935), U.S. Representative from Delaware, 1971–74; Governor of Delaware, 1977–85; candidate for Republican nomination for president, 1988.

== The Dupres and Moutons ==
- Jacques Dupre (1773–1846), Louisiana State Representative, Louisiana State Senator, Governor of Louisiana 1830–31. Grandfather-in-law of Alexander Mouton.
  - Alexander Mouton (1804–1885), Louisiana State Representative 1827–31 1836, candidate for U.S. Representative from Louisiana 1830, U.S. Senator from Louisiana 1837–42, Governor of Louisiana 1842–46. Grandson-in-law of Jacques Dupre.

== The Durands and Moores ==
- John Moore, Mayor of Saginaw, Michigan 1861–63; candidate for U.S. Representative from Michigan 1862; candidate for Governor of Michigan 1868; Circuit Court Judge in Michigan 1871–74. Father-in-law Lorenzo T. Durand.
  - George H. Durand (1838–1903), Flint, Michigan Alderman 1862–67; Mayor of Flint, Michigan 1873–74; U.S. Representative from Michigan 1875–77; Justice of the Michigan Supreme Court 1892–93. Brother of Lorenzo T. Durand.
  - Lorenzo T. Durand (1849–1917), Prosecuting Attorney of Saginaw County, Michigan 1879–82; candidate for Governor of Michigan 1902; candidate for Circuit Court Judge in Michigan 1917. Brother of George H. Durand.

== The Durkans ==
- Martin Durkan representative from Cascade County, Montana 1912-1913
  - Martin Durkan (1923–2005), Washington House of Representatives 31st district 1957 to 1959; Washington State Senate 47th district 1959 to 1975
    - Jenny Durkan (b. 1958), United States Attorney for the Western District of Washington 2009–2014; Mayor of Seattle 2017–present
    - Kathleen Durkan, political lobbyist and NBC News correspondent
    - Martin "Jamie" Durkan Jr., political lobbyist
    - Theresa Ryan Durkan, land-use attorney and political lobbyist
    - Timothy Durkan, special assistant to former Seattle mayor Greg Nickels and employee of the Seattle Department of Neighborhoods under former Seattle mayor Mike McGinn

== The Dwights ==
- Jeremiah W. Dwight (1819–1885), Chairman of the Board of Supervisors of Dryden, New York 1857–58; New York Assemblyman 1860–61; delegate to the Republican National Convention 1868 1872 1876 1880 1884; U.S. Representative from New York 1877–83. Father of John Wilbur Dwight.
  - John Wilbur Dwight (1859–1928), U.S. Representative from New York 1903–13. Son of Jeremiah W. Dwight.

== The Dyers ==
- Benjamin Dyer (1778–1823), Virginia House Delegate 1819–22. Father of Benjamin Dyer Jr.
  - Benjamin Dyer Jr. (1821–1914), Virginia House Delegate 1876–79. Son of Benjamin Dyer.
  - David Patterson Dyer (1838–1924), Missouri State Representative 1862–65, delegate to the Republican National Convention 1868, U.S. Representative from Missouri 1869–71, candidate for Governor of Missouri 1880, U.S. Attorney in Missouri 1902–07, U.S. Judge in Missouri 1907–19. Nephew of Benjamin Dyer.
    - Leonidas C. Dyer (1871–1857), U.S. Representative from Missouri 1811–13 1815–33, candidate for U.S. Representative from Missouri 1834 1836. Nephew of David Patterson Dyer.
      - Otis M. Dyer (1899–1989), delegate to the Republican National Convention 1964. Relative of David Patterson Dyer and Leonidas C. Dyer.

== The Dyers of Rhode Island ==
- Elisha Dyer (1811–1890), Governor of Rhode Island 1857–59. Father of Elisha Dyer Jr.
  - Elisha Dyer Jr. (1839–1906), Governor of Rhode Island 1897–1900. Son of Elisha Dyer.

== The Dyks and Katzens ==
- Timothy B. Dyk (born 1937), Judge of the United States Court of Appeals for the Federal Circuit 2000–present.
- Sally Katzen (born 1942), Administrator of the Office of Information and Regulatory Affairs in the Office of Management and Budget 1993–98, Deputy Director of the National Economic Council 1998–99, Deputy Director for Management in the Office of Management and Budget 1999–2001. Wife of Timothy B. Dyk.
