= Desnoyers =

Desnoyers is a surname. Notable people with the surname include:

- Auguste Gaspard Louis Desnoyers (1800–1887), French engraver
- Caleb Desnoyers (born 2007), Canadian ice hockey player
- Daniel Desnoyers, Canadian radio host and DJ
- Elliot Desnoyers (born 2002), Canadian ice hockey player
- Jules Desnoyers (1800–1887), French geologist and archaeologist
- Luc Desnoyers (born 1950), Canadian politician
- Peter J. Desnoyers (1772–1846), Detroit silversmith and businessman
- Peter Desnoyers (1800–1880), Detroit businessman and politician

== See also ==
- Charles Desnoyer (1806–1858), French actor, playwright and theatre manager
