= Woodlawn Cemetery (Green Bay, Wisconsin) =

Cemetery located in Allouez, Wisconsin

- Interactive map of Woodlawn Cemetery

Details
- Established: 1857 (burials did not begin until 1867)
- Location: Allouez, Wisconsin
- Coordinates: 44.4907°N 88.0204°W
- Find a Grave: Woodlawn Cemetery

Woodlawn Cemetery is an all-faith cemetery located in Allouez, Wisconsin, United States, under a Green Bay address. Originally incorporated in 1857 by several prominent city leaders, burials did not begin at the cemetery until 1867. It is the city's oldest all-faiths cemetery. (Note: Fort Howard Memorial Park, the city's other all-faiths cemetery, was founded in 1862. https://www.forthoward.net/index.php/history/our-history/)

== History ==
The cemetery was incorporated in 1857, shortly after Green Bay's official incorporation, by several Green Bay politicians as a "non-profit, non-sectarian cemetery." The founding group included future mayors Henry S. Baird, Nathan Goodell, Burley Follett, Charles D. Robinson, H. E. Eastman, Francis X. Desnoyers, as well as future senator and U.S. Postmaster Timothy O. Howe and town postmaster Daniel W. King. The cemetery's original plots were set to be in the city's Baird Park, but were moved to the current cemetery in 1867.

== Notable burials ==
- Charles C. P. Arndt, Wisconsin Territory legislator, killed by fellow-legislator James Russell Vineyard.
- Henry S. Baird, Wisconsin Territory Attorney General, 7th mayor of Green Bay, cemetery founder, one of the founding fathers of the Wisconsin State Bar.
- Edgar Conklin, Wisconsin state legislator and pioneer
- Eleazor H. Ellis, 6th mayor of Green Bay
- Nathan Goodell, 5th and 9th mayor of Green Bay, cemetery founder
- Henry F. Hagemeister, state legislator, founder of Hagemeister Brewing Co., namesake of Hagemeister Park—the first home field of the Green Bay Packers
- Timothy O. Howe, U.S. Senator, U.S. Postmaster General, Wisconsin circuit judge and ex-officio justice of the original Wisconsin Supreme Court, cemetery founder
- Thomas R. Hudd, U.S. House Representative
- Gustav Küstermann, U.S. House Representative
- Morgan Lewis Martin, Wisconsin Territory delegate to the U.S. House of Representatives
- Mike Michalske, football player and coach
- Robert E. Minahan, 30th mayor of Green Bay, prominent early 20th century surgeon.
- Arthur C. Neville, 25th mayor of Green Bay
- Charles D. Robinson, 11th and 15th mayor of Green Bay, 3rd Secretary of State of Wisconsin
- W. C. E. Thomas, 1st mayor of Green Bay
