= Jeremiah S. Bacon =

American politician (1858–1939)

Member of the Louisiana House of Representatives
- In office 1926–1932
- Preceded by: J. Frank Colbert
- Succeeded by: Eddie N. Payne

Personal details
- Born: September 16, 1858
- Died: August 3, 1939 (aged 80)
- Party: Democratic
- Spouse: Martha Russell
- Children: 6

Jeremiah S. Bacon (September 16, 1858 – August 3, 1939) was an American politician. He served as a Democratic member of the Louisiana House of Representatives.

Bacon was born on a farm. He attended Minden Male Academy. In 1926, Bacon was elected to the Louisiana House of Representatives, winning a special election to complete J. Frank Colbert's leftover term. Bacon was succeeded by Eddie N. Payne in 1932.

Bacon died in August 1939, at the age of 80.
