= Myron P. Lindsley =

American politician (1825–1883)

Member of the Wisconsin Senate from the 2nd district
- In office January 1, 1872 – January 1, 1874
- Preceded by: Lyman Walker
- Succeeded by: John Milton Read

10th Mayor of Green Bay, Wisconsin
- In office April 1865 – April 1866
- Preceded by: Nathan Goodell
- Succeeded by: Charles D. Robinson

County Clerk of Brown County, Wisconsin
- In office January 1, 1861 – January 1, 1869
- Preceded by: Oscar Gray
- Succeeded by: John B. Eugene
- In office January 1, 1855 – January 1, 1857
- Preceded by: William Field Jr.
- Succeeded by: Lucian B. Wright

Personal details
- Born: Myron Plato Lindsley; September 18, 1825 Rushville, New York, U.S.
- Died: January 16, 1883 (aged 57) Madison, Wisconsin, U.S.
- Resting place: Woodlawn Cemetery, Green Bay, Wisconsin
- Party: Democratic
- Spouse: Frances A. Ingalls (m. 1854–1883)
- Children: Thales C. Lindsley^{(b. 1856; died 1918)}; Lelia Elizabeth (Desnoyers)^{(b. 1860; died 1920)}
- Education: Union College
- Profession: lawyer, politician

Myron Plato Lindsley (September 18, 1825 – January 16, 1883) was an American attorney and Democratic politician. He was the 10th Mayor of Green Bay, Wisconsin, and represented Green Bay for two years in the Wisconsin State Senate.

== Biography ==
Lindsley was born in Rushville, New York, and raised on his family's farm in Yates County. He graduated from Union College in Schenectady, New York, in 1849. He went on to study law at John W. Fowler's Law School at Ballston Spa, New York, and graduated in 1850.

He came to Wisconsin later that year and settled at Green Bay, where he established a legal practice. His practice soon grew to include real estate and collections.

He became involved in local politics and was elected to his first two-year term as County Clerk of Brown County in 1854. He was subsequently elected again in 1860, and reelected in 1862, 1864, and 1866. In April 1865, concurrent with his time as Clerk, he was elected Mayor of Green Bay, serving one year.

In 1871, he was elected on the Democratic Party ticket to represent Brown County in the Wisconsin State Senate.

The next year, in the 1872 election, he was the Democratic nominee for United States House of Representatives in Wisconsin's 6th congressional district. He was defeated in that race by incumbent Philetus Sawyer.

== Personal life and family ==
Lindsley married Frances A. Ingalls in 1854. Together they had two children, Thales and Lelia Elizabeth ("Lizzie").

Thales enlisted in the United States Army for the Spanish–American War and was stationed in Manila. He remained in the Philippines for the rest of his life, working for the American administration there.

Lizzie married Frank B. Desnoyers, who would also serve as mayor of Green Bay. Frank was the son of Francis X. Desnoyers, who was also a former mayor of Green Bay.

He was active in the Presbyterian church and was superintendent of the Sunday school. He was also a prominent member of the Independent Order of Odd Fellows—he was Grand Master of Wisconsin for two terms and Grand Representative to the Sovereign Grand Lodge.

Lindlsey suffered from digestive issues for several years, and found his condition badly exacerbated during a trip to Grand Forks, Dakota Territory, where he was investigating a speculative land deal. On his way back to Green Bay, he stopped to rest in Madison, Wisconsin, where he died at the home of fellow Odd Fellow L. B. Hills.

== Electoral history ==
=== Wisconsin Senate (1871) ===
Wisconsin Senate, 2nd District Election, 1871
Party	Candidate	Votes	%	±%
General Election, November 3, 1871
Democratic	Myron P. Lindsley	2,498	51.68%	−0.15%
Republican	E. T. Sprague	2,336	48.32%	
Plurality		162	3.35%	+0.30%
Total votes		4,834	100.0%	+23.92%
Democratic hold				

=== U.S. House of Representatives (1872) ===
Wisconsin's 6th Congressional District Election, 1872
Party	Candidate	Votes	%	±%
General Election, November 5, 1872
Republican	Philetus Sawyer (incumbent)	15,803	56.12%	−3.60%
Democratic	Myron P. Lindsley	12,358	43.88%	
Plurality		3,445	12.23%	-7.20%
Total votes		28,161	100.0%	+30.67%
Republican hold				
