= J. Frank Colbert =

American politician (1882–1949)

Mayor of Minden, Louisiana
- In office July 3, 1944 – July 1, 1946
- Preceded by: John Calhoun Brown, mayor pro-tem
- Succeeded by: John T. David

Member of Webster Parish Police Jury
- In office 1912–1920
- Preceded by: J. D. Taylor
- Succeeded by: At large: J. H. Nelson; M. D. Wren H. J. Heflin
- In office 1936–1940
- Preceded by: Walton Fort
- Succeeded by: W. Matt Lowe

Louisiana State Representative from Webster Parish
- In office 1920–1925
- Preceded by: James Peter Kent
- Succeeded by: J. S. Bacon

Personal details
- Born: May 28, 1882 Webster Parish, Louisiana
- Died: May 20, 1949 (aged 66) Minden, Louisiana
- Party: Democratic Party
- Spouse: Never married
- Occupation: Politician; newspaperman; businessman

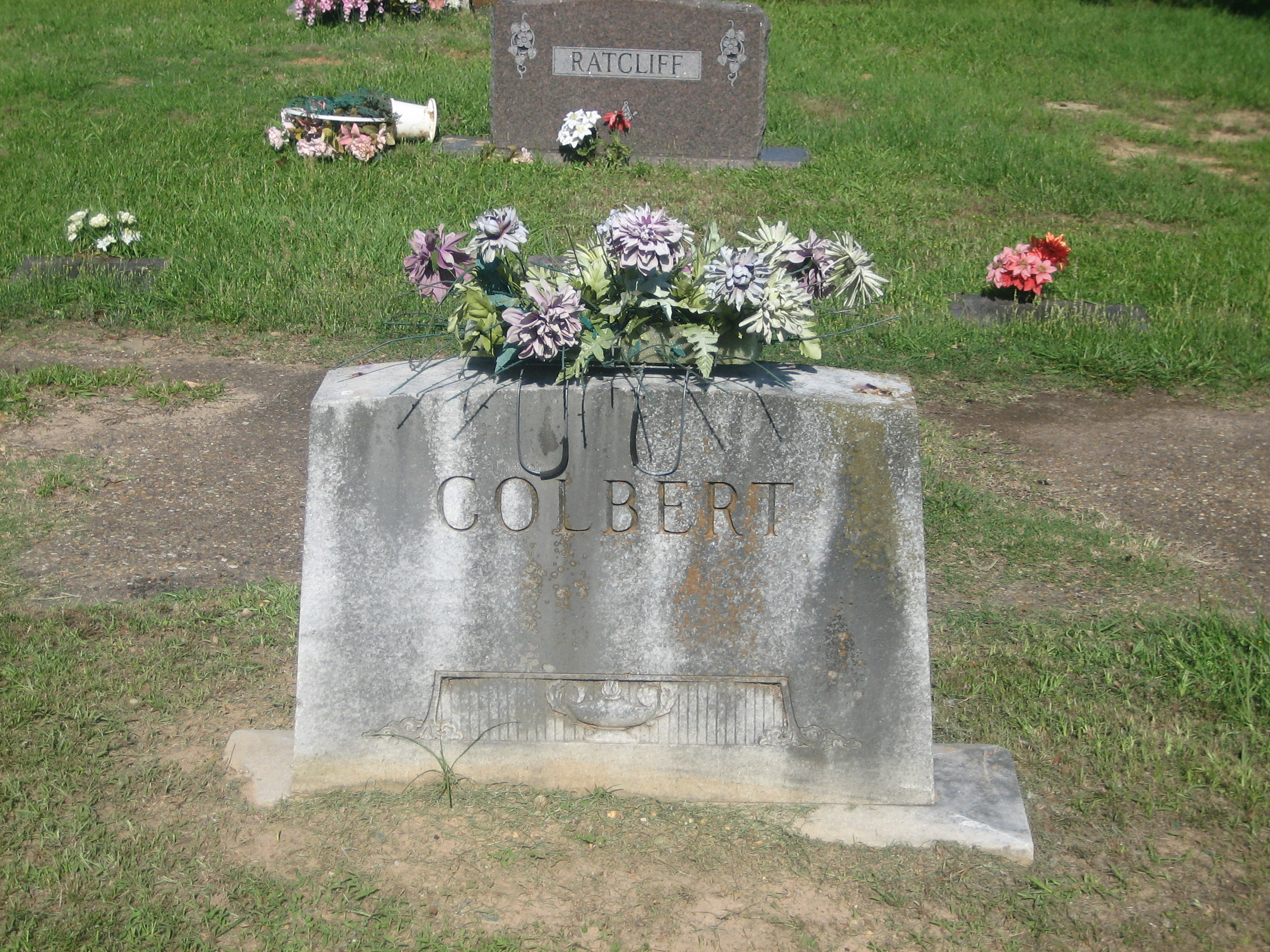
Faded Colbert family tombstone at Minden Cemetery in Minden, Louisiana

Jefferson Franklin Colbert, known as J. Frank Colbert (May 28, 1882 – May 20, 1949), was a Democratic politician and Georgist based in Webster Parish, Louisiana. He later worked in real estate.

== Background ==
Colbert was born in Webster Parish in 1882 to John A. Colbert and his third wife, the former Sarah Eliza Taylor.

== Political career ==
Colbert served in the Louisiana House of Representatives from 1920 to 1925. Colbert ran unsuccessfully in 1940 for the House seat formerly held by John N. Sandlin, on whose staff Colbert had once worked.

Colbert also served from 1944 to 1946 as the mayor of the small city of Minden, the seat of government of Webster Parish in northwestern Louisiana. He had previously and later again served on the Webster Parish Police Jury.

== Henry George movement ==
Georgism, in modern times also called Geoism, and known historically as the single tax movement, is an economic ideology holding that persons (including corporations) should own the value that they produce themselves, while the economic rent derived from land—including from all natural resources, the commons, and urban locations—should belong equally to all members of society. Developed from the writings of American economist and social reformer Henry George, the Georgist paradigm seeks solutions to social and ecological problems based on principles of land rights and public finance that attempt to integrate economic efficiency with social justice. During the Great Depression, Colbert became involved in the Georgist movement and published an article about its single tax proposal.

== Mayoral service ==
Colbert won the primary for the mayor's office by 26 votes, 731 votes (50.9 percent) to 705 (49.1 percent). Given Democratic dominance of the state, and disenfranchisement of most African Americans, who had supported Republicans, Colbert won the general election and served for two years. He did not seek a second two-year term as mayor in 1946.

== Death ==
Colbert died on May 20, 1949 at age 66.

Political offices
Preceded by James Peter Kent	State Representative for Webster Parish; Jefferson Franklin Colbert; 1920—1925	Succeeded by J. S. Bacon
Preceded by John Calhoun Brown, mayor pro-tem	Mayor of Minden, Louisiana; Jefferson Franklin Colbert; 1944—1946	Succeeded by John T. David
Preceded by J. D. Taylor	Member of the Webster Parish Police Jury; Jefferson Franklin Colbert. 1912—1920	Succeeded by At-large in Ward 4: M. D. Wren; James Harvey "J. H." Nelson H. J. Heflin
Preceded by Walton Fort	Member of the Webster Parish Police Jury; Jefferson Franklin Colbert. 1936—1940	Succeeded by W. Matt Lowe
