= W. C. E. Thomas =

First Mayor of Green Bay, Wisconsin

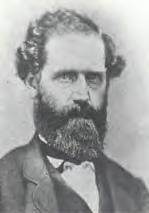

1st Mayor of Green Bay, Wisconsin
- In office May 6, 1854 – April 1855
- Preceded by: Position established
- Succeeded by: Francis X. Desnoyers

Personal details
- Born: November 21, 1818 Muncy, Pennsylvania, U.S.
- Died: August 13, 1876 (aged 57) Green Bay, Wisconsin, U.S.
- Resting place: Woodlawn Cemetery, Green Bay, Wisconsin
- Party: Republican
- Spouse: Jane H. Eames (m. 1846–1876)
- Children: William Eames Thomas^{(b. 1848; died 1903)}; Frank Thomas^{(died young)}; Carrie Thomas^{(died young)}

William C. E. Thomas (November 21, 1818 – August 13, 1876) was an American publisher, Republican politician, and Wisconsin pioneer. He was the first mayor of Green Bay, Wisconsin. After his mayoral term, he served more than a decade as city clerk, and served the last five years of his life as postmaster. In virtually all documents, he is referred to by the abbreviated name W. C. E. Thomas.

== Biography ==
W. C. E. Thomas was born in Muncy, Pennsylvania, on November 21, 1818. He was educated in public schools before attending the Milton Academy in Milton, Pennsylvania. While at Milton, he apprenticed in a printing shop for four years, and learned the printing trade.

In 1839, he moved west, settling at Galena, Illinois, where he worked for the Galena Daily Gazette for nearly ten years. After a period of bad health, he moved north to Green Bay, in the new state of Wisconsin. There, he partnered with Edwin R. Wadsworth and Cyrus Eames in a tannery business. He worked here until 1851, when he became a general merchant.

He became one of the more popular citizens at Green Bay, and, when the city received its official charter in 1854, he was elected their first mayor, serving one year.

When the first American Express office in Green Bay was opened in 1857, Thomas was hired as the agent for that office and worked in that role through 1871. Concurrent to this, he was city clerk, elected by the city council in 1858, and held that role until 1871.

In 1871, he was appointed postmaster for Green Bay by President Ulysses S. Grant for a term to begin in 1872. He held this office until his death in 1876.

He suffered from declining health for two years, beginning in 1874, and was confined to his home for the last two months of his life. After a month of significant suffering, he died on August 13, 1876.

== Personal life and family ==
W. C. E. Thomas was a son of Arthur and Susan (née Gillespie) Thomas, of Lycoming County, Pennsylvania. Arthur Thomas was a merchant.

On March 8, 1846, W. C. E. Thomas married Jane H. Eames, in Jo Daviess County, Illinois. Jane Eames was the daughter of Wisconsin pioneer Cyrus Eames. Together they had two sons and a daughter, though only one son, William Eames Thomas, survived infancy.

After W. C. E. Thomas' death, his son resided at his former home at 318 North Van Buren Street. The home still stood at that location until 2015, when it was replaced by a set of row houses.

== Electoral history ==
Green Bay Mayoral Election, 1854
Party	Candidate	Votes	%
General Election, May 1, 1854
Nonpartisan	W. C. E. Thomas	126	64.28%
Nonpartisan	David Agry	40	20.41%
Nonpartisan	Baron S. Doty	30	15.31%
Plurality		86	43.88%
Total votes		196	100.0%

Political offices
City incorporated	Mayor of Green Bay, Wisconsin; May 6, 1854 – April 1854	Succeeded by Francis X. Desnoyers
