= Richard Maxwell Drew =

American politician

Member of the Louisiana House of Representatives
- In office 1848–1850

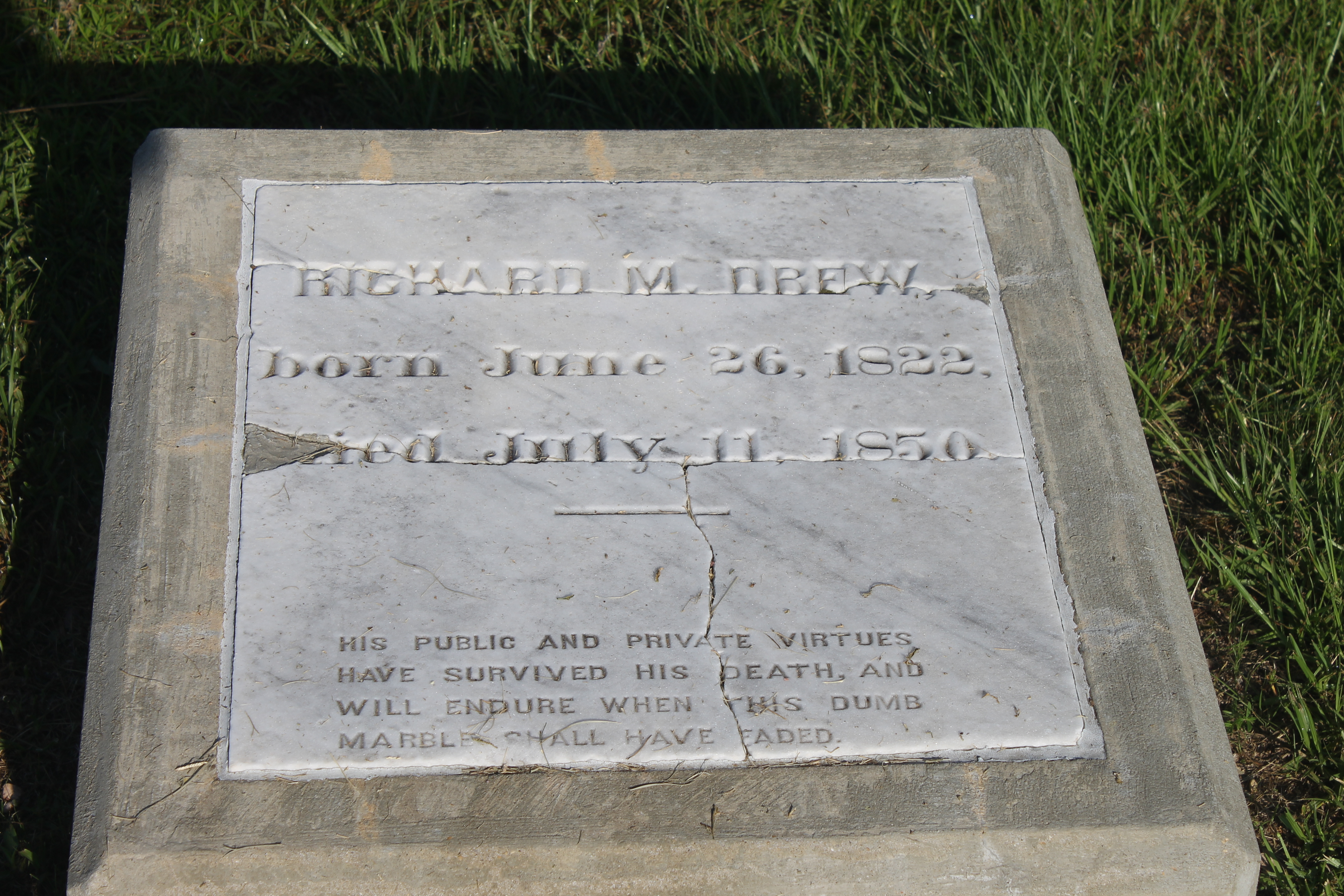
Centaph of Drew at Minden Cemetery.

Richard Maxwell Drew (June 26, 1822 – July 11, 1850) was an American politician who served in the Louisiana House of Representatives from 1848 to 1850.
