= Burley Follett =

American politician (1806–1877)

Mayor of Green Bay, Wisconsin
- In office 1858–1858
- Preceded by: H. E. Eastman
- Succeeded by: Nathan Goodell

Mayor of Green Bay, Wisconsin
- In office 1863–1863
- Preceded by: Henry S. Baird
- Succeeded by: Nathan Goodell

Personal details
- Born: December 30, 1806 Otsego County, New York, U.S.
- Died: February 21, 1877 (aged 70) Green Bay, Wisconsin, U.S.
- Spouse: Elizabeth Arndt Ward
- Children: 11

Burley Follett (December 30, 1806 – February 21, 1877) was an American politician who served as the fourth and eighth mayor of Green Bay, Wisconsin.

== Biography ==
Follett was born on December 30, 1806, in Otsego County, New York. In 1822, he moved to Detroit, Michigan. Follett first came to Wisconsin to deliver supplies to the garrisons of Fort Howard and Fort Winnebago. He took up permanent residence in Green Bay following the Black Hawk War. Follett married Elizabeth Arndt Ward, with whom he had eleven children. They lived for a time in De Pere, Wisconsin. After their return to Green Bay, Follett worked in the employment of Frank B. Desnoyers, who would also become Mayor of Green Bay. Follett died in Green Bay on February 21, 1877, following a stroke.

== Political career ==
Follett was mayor in 1858 and 1863. Previously, he had been register of deeds and treasurer of Green Bay, as well as an alderman.
