= Minden Cemetery =

Cemetery in Minden, Louisiana

The Minden Cemetery
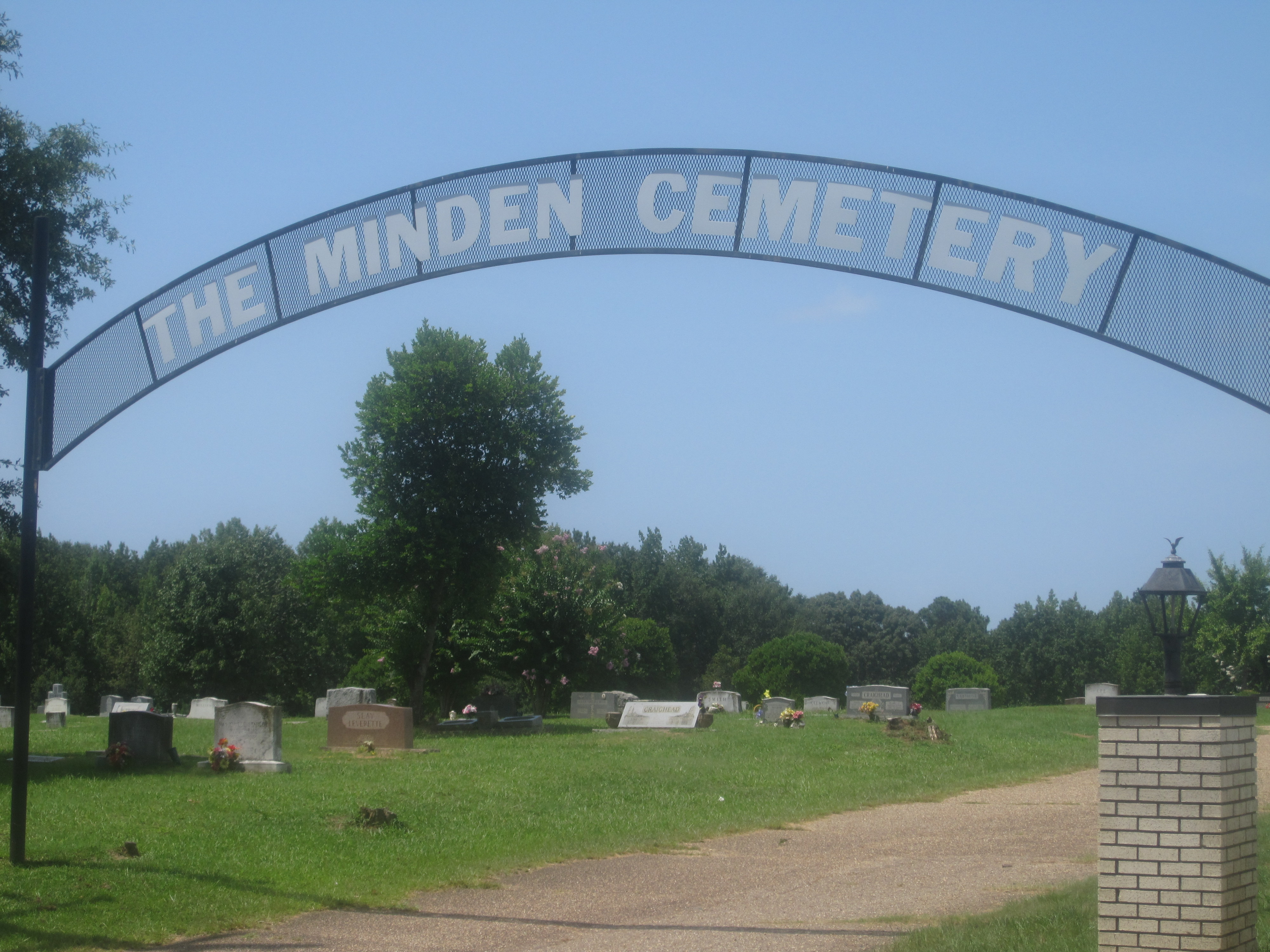
- Entrance to Minden Cemetery at Goodwill Street.
- Interactive map of The Minden Cemetery

Details
- Established: Before 1843
- Location: Minden, Louisiana
- Country: US
- Coordinates: 32.6167°N 93.2936°W
- Find a Grave: The Minden Cemetery

The Minden Cemetery, located in Minden, the seat of Webster Parish in northwestern Louisiana, United States, has graves dating from 1843, seven years after the founding of the city in 1836. Some of the oldest marked graves date back to the era of the American Civil War, but most are 20th-century interments.

== Location ==
Part of the graveyard is located south of Bayou Avenue not far from the downtown district. A larger section is bordered by Bayou Avenue on the west, Goodwill Street on the south and Rephart Street on the north and east. Rephart Street follows the easternmost part of the newer portion of the cemetery adjacent to the main artery of traffic, Pine Street. There is a traffic light at the intersection of Pine and Goodwill at one of several entrances to the cemetery.

== History ==
According to the cemetery website, historical accounts differ on when interments began at the cemetery. Many older grave markers were destroyed in a tornado on May 1, 1933. The first grave, the re-interment of a Mrs. Mary A. Smith on April 22, 1840, is unmarked, having been among the monuments toppled in the tornado. Two other early graves are those of Sarah Emily Pennell on September 13, 1843, and Samuel B. Harper on October 12, 1859. In 1854, the cemetery owners, Colonel and Mrs. John Langdon Lewis, deeded the property to the city of Minden. As of 2009, gravemarkers still existed dating back to 1843.

In 1864, the bodies of twenty-one Confederate soldiers who died of wounds suffered at the Battle of Mansfield were buried in unmarked graves in the cemetery. In 1936, an obelisk was placed at the site of the graves. Individual markers were placed near the obelisk in 2008 to honor the soldiers.

The last surviving Confederate widow in Minden, storekeeper Alberta Glass (August 25, 1845 – January 8, 1937), is interred at Minden Cemetery.

In 2003, the Minden Cemetery Association began conducting an annual "Ghost Walk" to raise money for cemetery upkeep. The event features citizens dressed in period costume portraying some of those interred at the cemetery.

== Notable burials ==
Prominent local citizens interred here include two U.S. representatives, four state representatives, a state senator from the 1950s, and twelve mayors who served since 1910. Their tombstones are pictured in their (if any)Wikipedia articles, accordingly:

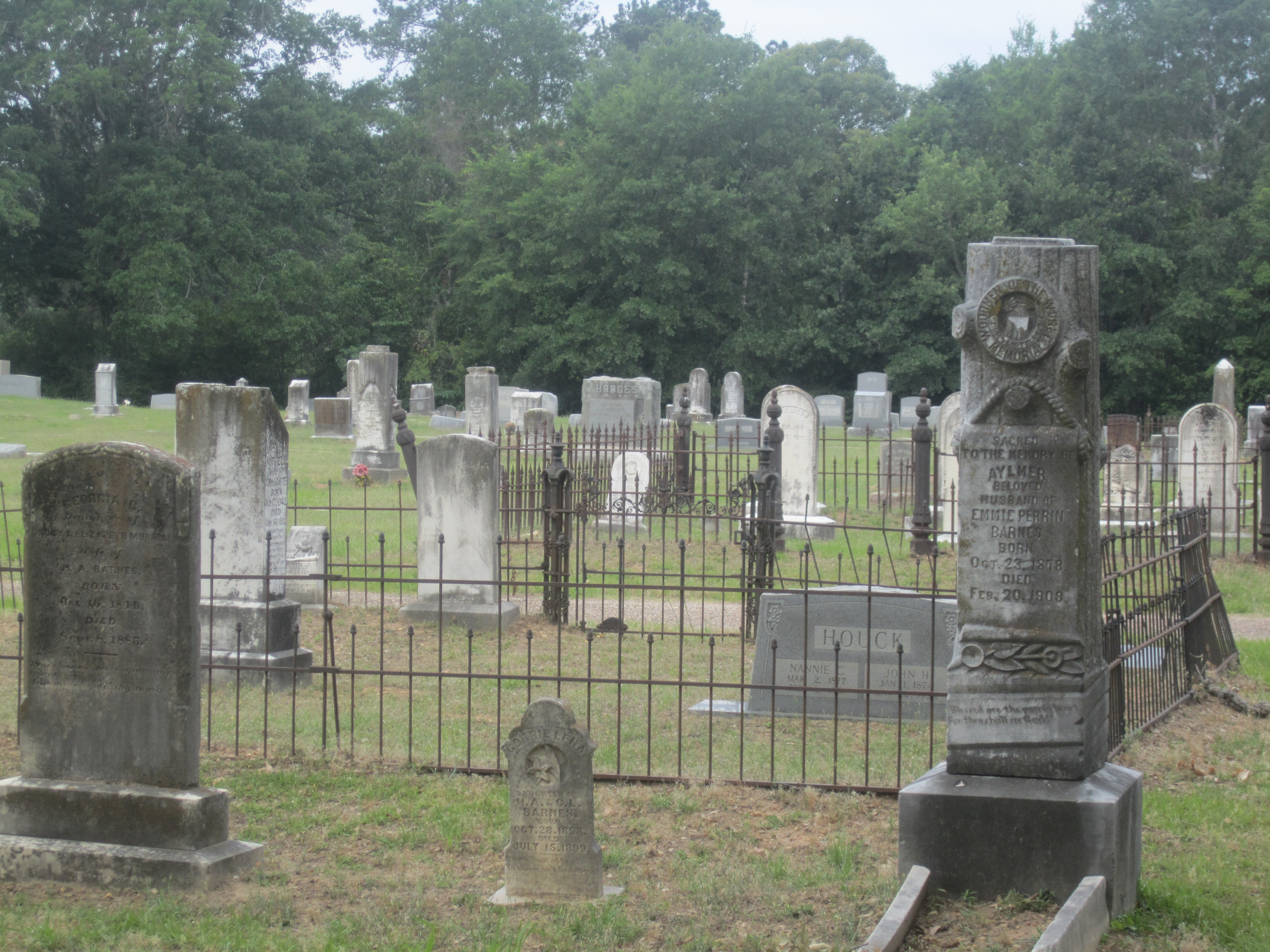
Historic Minden Cemetery has graves dating from the era of the American Civil War.

Mayors in chronological order

- J. J. Carter (1832–1907), mayor 1891–93; state representative for Webster Parish, 1878–80
- McIntyre H. Sandlin (1870–1955), mayor 1894–96; state representative, 1896–1900, parish tax assessor, 1908–37
- Abner Drake Turner (1877–1953), mayor 1910–16
- W. Matt Lowe, mayor 1916–20
- J. Berry Sandefur (1868–1954), mayor 1920 to 1922
- Connell Fort, mayor 1922–26 and 1932–34
- Henry L. Bridges, mayor 1928–32 and 1934–36
- David William Thomas, mayor 1936–40
- John Calhoun Brown (1879–1964), interim mayor 1942–44
- J. Frank Colbert, mayor 1944–46; state representative
- John T. David, mayor 1946–55
- Jasper Goodwill, mayor 1955–58
- Frank T. Norman, mayor 1958–66
- Jack Batton, mayor 1978–82

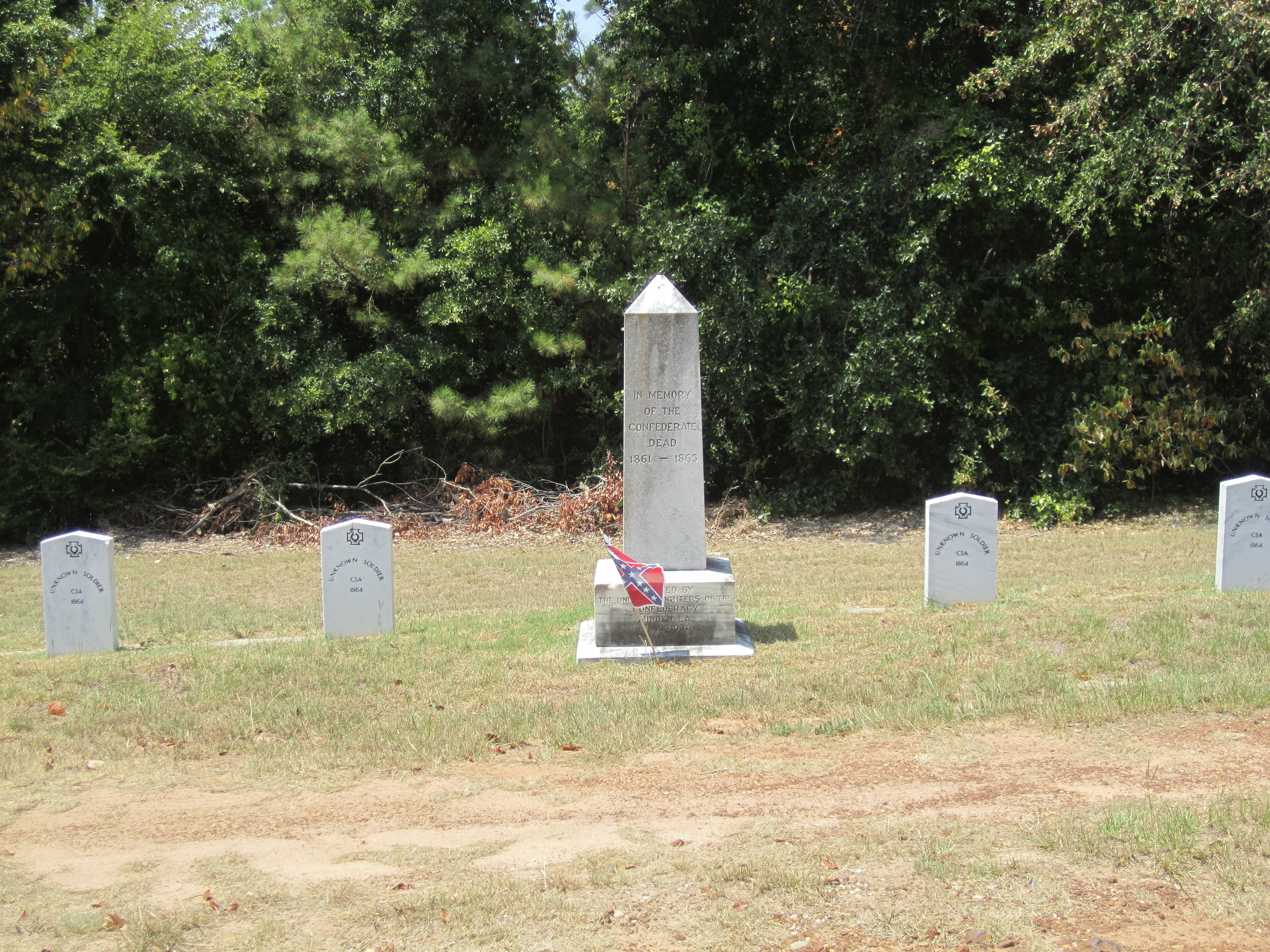
Confederate monument (May 1936) in old section of Minden Cemetery.

Others in alphabetical order

- R. Harmon Drew, Sr., city judge, state representative from 1972–78
- Thomas Wafer Fuller, state senator 1896–1900; Webster Parish school superintendent 1908–20
- E.D. Gleason, state representative
- Mary Smith Gleason, interim state representative (tombstone included in E.D. Gleason article)
- Fred Haynes, LSU Tigers football star
- O. H. Haynes, Jr., Webster Parish sheriff 1964–80
- O. H. Haynes, Sr. (1933–1952), Webster Parish sheriff
- Herman "Wimpy" Jones, state senator 1956–60
- John Sidney Killen, state representative
- John N. Sandlin, district attorney, state court judge, U.S. representative
- Nicholas J. Sandlin, district attorney, police juror, state representative, postmaster
- Ada Jack Carver Snell, short story writer
- E. L. Stewart, Minden lawyer and state representative
- William G. Stewart, farmer, school board president, and namesake of the former William G. Stewart Elementary School in Minden
- John T. Watkins, U.S. representative
- H. O. West, businessman
- B. F. Griffith, Sr., Webster Parish sheriff (1900–08)
- Gladys Powell Hunter (1899–1973), first female member of Webster Parish School Board (1950–62)
- Peggy Janice Staples (1933–2009), first female Minden City Councillor, elected 1978
