= Minden Male Academy =

School in Louisiana, USA

Minden Male Academy, originally Minden Academy, was a school in Minden, Louisiana. It was founded by Charles H. Veeder using a grant of $1,500 from the Louisiana Legislature. It was one of the few private schools in the state that was partly public-funded. John T. Watkins was one of its alumni.

== History ==
Minden Academy was established in 1838. The second principal of the school was Henry M. Spofford who went on to become a judge in the Louisiana Supreme Court. The Louisiana Constitution of 1845 made it illegal for private schools to receive public funds and the school was still running a fund for "indigent" children using the original state funding. As a result, the school was split into the Minden Male Academy and the Minden Female College in 1850.

A new campus was constructed for the male school, funded by W. Abner Drake, Drury Murrell, and J. and T. Gibbs. The male academy lasted into the late 1890s, when the Louisiana Constitution of 1898 required that a public school system be created. The male and female schools were recombined and converted into the Minden Public School.
