= Harvey Locke Carey =

American attorney, military lieutenant and politician

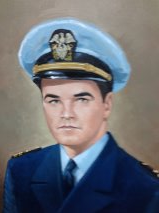
- Carey in 1954

Assistant Attorney General of Louisiana
- In office 1948–1950
- Governor: Earl Long
- Attorney General: Bolivar Edwards Kemp Jr.

United States Attorney for the Western District of Louisiana
- In office August 29, 1950 – January 24, 1952; On leave: December 1950 – March 1951
- President: Harry S. Truman
- Preceded by: William J. Fleniken (acting); Malcolm Lafargue
- Succeeded by: William J. Fleniken

Personal details
- Born: January 18, 1915 Parkin, Arkansas, U.S.
- Died: January 8, 1984 (aged 68) Minden, Louisiana, U.S.
- Party: Democratic
- Spouse: Katie Drew (died. 1967)
- Relatives: R. Harmon Drew Sr. (brother-in-law)
- Education: University of Arkansas; Tulane University
- Occupation: Attorney, military lieutenant

Harvey Locke Carey (January 18, 1915 – January 8, 1984) was an American attorney, military lieutenant and politician. A member of the Democratic Party, he served as assistant attorney general of Louisiana from 1948 to 1950 and as the United States attorney for the Western District of Louisiana from 1950 to 1952.

== Life and career ==
Carey was born in Parkin, Arkansas, the son of Gregory William Carey, a circuit judge, and Willie Belle Locke. He attended Paris High School, graduating in 1931. After graduating, he attended the University of Arkansas, where he played college football for the Arkansas Razorbacks football team. He also attended Tulane University, earning his law degree in 1939, which after earning his degree, he served with the Fleet Marine Force in the United States Naval Amphibous Forces during World War II. During his military service, he received his ensign's commission and completed his naval training at Dartmouth College, later continuing his naval training at Princeton University, and was promoted to the rank of lieutenant in 1945.

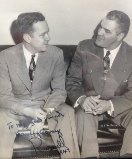
Carey (right) with Russell B. Long, 1949

Carey served as assistant attorney general of Louisiana from 1948 to 1950. After his service as assistant attorney general, he served as the United States attorney for the Western District of Louisiana from 1950 to 1952.

== Death ==
Carey died on January 8, 1984, at the Meadowview Nursing Home in Minden, Louisiana, at the age of 68.
