= Frank B. Desnoyers =

American politician (1859–1945)

27th Mayor of Green Bay, Wisconsin
- In office 1896–1898
- Preceded by: James H. Elmore
- Succeeded by: Simon J. Murphy Jr.

Personal details
- Born: August 7, 1859
- Died: 1945 (aged 85–86)
- Spouse(s): Leila E. Lindsley (m. 1882; died 1920) Augusta Nixon (m. 1923)
- Children: 4
- Parent(s): Francis X. Desnoyers; Louisa A. Baird
- Relatives: Peter J. Desnoyers (grandfather)
- Occupation: Politiciain

Frank B. Desnoyers was an American politician who served as the 27th mayor of Green Bay, Wisconsin, from 1896 to 1898.

== Biography ==
Desnoyers was born on August 7, 1859. His father, Francis, had previously been Mayor of Green Bay. He married Leila E. Lindsley, daughter of Green Bay Mayor M. P. Lindsley, in 1882. They had four children before her death on October 19, 1920. In 1923, he married Augusta Nixon of Ashland, Virginia. He died in 1945.

== Political career ==
Desnoyers served as Mayor of Green Bay from 1896 to 1898. Later, he served as a Green Bay City Councilman and Treasurer of Brown County, Wisconsin.
