= Nathan Goodell =

American politician (1798–1883)

Mayor of Green Bay, Wisconsin
- In office 1859–1859
- Preceded by: Burley Follett
- Succeeded by: E. H. Ellis

Mayor of Green Bay, Wisconsin
- In office 1864–1864
- Preceded by: Burley Follett
- Succeeded by: M. P. Lindsley

Personal details
- Born: August 8, 1798 Pomfret, Connecticut, U.S.
- Died: June 2, 1883 (aged 84)
- Spouse: Hannah Mosely Weeks
- Children: 2
- Parent(s): Richard Goodell; Marcia Goodell

Nathan Goodell (August 8, 1798 – June 2, 1883) was an American politician who served as the fifth and ninth mayor of Green Bay, Wisconsin.

== Biography ==
Goodell was born on August 8, 1798, in Pomfret, Connecticut. He was the eleventh of twelve children born to Richard and Marcia Goodell. Goodell moved to Jefferson County, New York, and married Hannah Mosely Weeks, the daughter of a Swedenborgian clergyman. They had two children. After their marriage, they moved to Detroit, Michigan, before settling in Green Bay. Goodell died from apparent pneumonia on June 2, 1883.

== Career ==
Goodell was mayor in 1859 and 1864. He was also Superintendent of Streets for a number of years.
