= R. Harmon Drew Sr. =

American politician (1917–1995)

Drew in 1935, almost four decades before being a state representative.

Richard Harmon Drew Sr. (February 5, 1917 – December 18, 1995) was an American politician who served in the Louisiana House of Representatives. He was the brother-in-law of Harvey Locke Carey, a military lieutenant.
