= Peter Desnoyers =

American businessman and politician

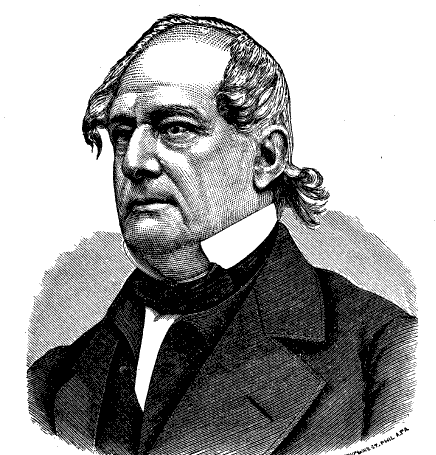
- Born: April 21, 1800; Detroit, Michigan Territory
- Died: March 6, 1880 (aged 79)

Peter Desnoyers (April 21, 1800 – March 6, 1880) was a businessman and politician from Detroit, Michigan, and served as an early State Treasurer of Michigan.

== Early life ==
Peter Desnoyers was born on April 21, 1800, in Detroit, Michigan, the first child of Peter J. Desnoyers and his wife Marie Louise. The younger Peter Desnoyers lived in Detroit during his childhood, and began a career as a merchant in 1821.

Desnoyers married Caroline Leib. The couple had two children: Edmund and Emilie. He later married Annie Hunt Whipple. The couple had two daughters: Frances Agnes and Catherine M.

== Public service ==
Desnoyers was elected county treasurer of Wayne County, Michigan, in 1826, the first man to be elected to that position. He was again elected treasurer in the next election, and was elected twice more later in life in 1843 and 1851. In 1827 he was elected alderman of the city of Detroit, and in 1831 he was appointed a United States Marshal by President Andrew Jackson, a position he held until 1837. In 1838 he was appointed city treasurer of Detroit, and in 1839 Governor Stevens T. Mason appointed him State Treasurer of Michigan, a post which he served until Mason left office in 1840.

In 1849, Desnoyers moved from Detroit to Hamtramck, Michigan. In 1850 he was elected a delegate to the Michigan Constitutional Convention, and in 1867 was again a delegate to the Convention.

Peter Desnoyers died March 6, 1880.

Political offices
Preceded by Henry Howard	State Treasurer of Michigan; 1839-1840	Succeeded by Robert Stuart
