= Francis X. Desnoyers =

American merchant and politician (1813–1868)

2nd Mayor of Green Bay, Wisconsin
- In office April 1855 – April 1856
- Preceded by: William C. E. Thomas
- Succeeded by: H. E. Eastman

Member of the Wisconsin State Assembly from the Brown–Door–Kewaunee district
- In office January 1854 – January 1855
- Preceded by: Randall Wilcox
- Succeeded by: Morgan Lewis Martin

Personal details
- Born: July 29, 1813 Detroit, Michigan Territory
- Died: August 13, 1868 (aged 55) Brown County, Wisconsin, U.S.
- Resting place: Allouez Catholic Cemetery, Green Bay, Wisconsin
- Party: Republican; Democratic (before 1855)
- Spouse: Louisa A. Baird
- Children: Frank B. Desnoyers and 2 others
- Parent(s): Peter J. Desnoyers; Marie

Francis Xavier Desnoyers (July 29, 1813 – August 13, 1868) was an American merchant, politician, and Wisconsin pioneer. He was the 2nd mayor of Green Bay, Wisconsin, and served in the Wisconsin State Assembly in the 1854 session.

== Biography ==
Desnoyers was born on July 29, 1813, in Detroit, Michigan Territory, the son of Peter J. Desnoyers and his wife Marie.

He married Louisa A. Baird of Philadelphia, Pennsylvania, and had three children. Their son, Frank, would also become mayor of Green Bay. Frank married Leila Lindsley, the daughter of former Green Bay mayor M. P. Lindsley. Francis X. Desnoyers died on August 13, 1868, aged 55.

== Political career ==
Desnoyers was mayor of Green Bay in 1855. He also served as an alderman. He was a Republican.

Wisconsin State Assembly
Preceded by Randall Wilcox	Member of the Wisconsin State Assembly from the Brown–Door–Kewaunee district January 2, 1854 – January 1, 1855	Succeeded by Morgan Lewis Martin
Political offices
Preceded by William C. E. Thomas	Mayor of Green Bay, Wisconsin; April 1855 – April 1856	Succeeded by H. E. Eastman
