= Peter J. Desnoyers =

Businessman and politician

- Born: Pierre Jean Desnoyers; August 1, 1772; Paris, France
- Died: June 3, 1846 (aged 73); Detroit, Michigan
- Children: Francis X. Desnoyers; Peter Desnoyers

Peter John Desnoyers (August 1, 1772 – June 3, 1846) was a silversmith and businessman, and a leading citizen of early Detroit, Michigan.

== Early life ==
Peter J. Desnoyers was born in Paris, France, on August 1, 1772, the son of Charles Roquiley Desnoyers and his wife Charlotte (Mallet) Desnoyers. He worked as a silversmith for his father until he was 18 years old. At that time, his father purchased for him some land from the Sciota Land Company, an American firm who was advertising in Paris for artists and artisans to emigrate. The younger Desnoyers set sail to America with other French citizens, arriving in 1790 in Gallipolis, Ohio, where their lands were supposed to be located. It turned out, however, that the land deal was a swindle, and their deeds were worthless.

== Life in Detroit ==
A few of the settlers remained, but Desnoyers moved on to Pittsburgh, and in 1796 accompanied General Anthony Wayne's army to Detroit. There he worked as an armorer for the government under Jean François Hamtramck.

On July 30, 1798, Desnoyers married Marie Louise Gobeille. The couple had twelve children: Peter (born April 21, 1800; died 1880), Marie Louise Rose (born November 12, 1801), Charles Chrysologus (born 1803; died 1804), Emilie (born July 29, 1805; died 1838), Marie Madeleine (born 1807; died 1808), Victoire (born February 12, 1809; died 1863), Charles Robert (born July 7, 1811; died 1846), Francis Xavier (born 1813), Elizabeth (born August 1, 1815; died 1895), Ann Caroline (born 1818; died 1822), Josephine Sylvie (born May 28, 1821), and Marie Antoinette (born 1827; died 1834).

Desnoyers continued as an armorer until 1803, when he went into business as a silversmith. However, the Great Fire of 1805 destroyed his store and stock. After the fire, Desnoyers rebuilt, this time constructing a building that housed both a general store and silversmithing works. He ran both businesses until 1822, when he turned his attention wholly to the general mercantile business. Desnoyers retired from his business in 1835 and remained in Detroit.

== Public Service ==
Desnoyers served in a number of positions of public trust. He was one of the first Trustees on the Board of Regents of the University of Michigan. He served a number of terms as a city alderman, and was director and president of the Bank of Michigan.

He died on June 3, 1846, at his home in Detroit.
