= Southwest Wisconsin Library System =

Federated library system in Wisconsin, US

The Southwest Wisconsin Library System is a federated library system in the US state of Wisconsin, which provides services to 28 public libraries in five counties (Crawford, Grant County, Iowa County, Lafayette County, and Richland County). It was established in its current form, with the support of the Wisconsin Department of Public Instruction, on January 1, 1974.

== History ==
The Southwest Association of Public Libraries (SWAPL) was founded in early 1956 as an informal discussion group between librarians from the 26 public libraries in the five-county region. SWAPL was interested in establishing a central processing center for ordering library materials in bulk. After the passage of the federal Library Services Act of 1956, SWAPL worked with the Wisconsin Free Library Commission to apply for federal grant funding. The Southwest Wisconsin Library Processing Center was the first of its kind in the state, and among the first in the nation. Member libraries were required to order at least 75 percent of their materials through the Center, at a cost of 10 cents per book. Of the 26 libraries in the region, 18 initially agreed to participate. (Note: These were the libraries in Argyle, Barneveld, Benton, Blanchardville, Bloomington, Boscobel, Cassville, Cuba City, Darlington, Fennimore, Gays Mills, Lancaster, Mineral Point, Platteville, Prairie du Chien, Richland Center, Shullsburg, and Viola. Those that initially opted out were Belmont, Blue River, Cobb, De Soto, Dodgeville, Livingston, Montfort, and Muscoda.) The Center, located inside the Dwight T. Parker Public Library in Fennimore, began operation on April 6, 1959. The Muscoda Public Library, which had been one of the eight to initially opt out, joined the program in May.

On September 1, 1961, with the expiration of the two-year federal grant that had launched the program, the governments of the five counties began paying for the operation of the Center. At that time, its name was changed to the Public Library Service Center of Southwest Wisconsin, reflecting the addition of other centralized services to the book processing facility. These included rotating supplementary collections, a reference service, and a bookmobile visiting 40 locations throughout the region once a month. By the early 1970s, all public libraries in the five counties (except De Soto, located in both Crawford and Vernon counties, and Blue River, which no longer had a public library) had joined the consortium.

In December 1971, the state legislature passed a law which offered financial support to cooperative public library systems similar to the concept that SWAPL had pioneered. However, the southwest region was not technically eligible for state funding under the new law, as each system was required to be centered on a city with a population of at least 30,000. The Public Library Service Center of Southwest Wisconsin circumvented this by partnering with the La Crosse Public Library to serve as its backup resource library. With this contract in place, the Southwest Wisconsin Library System was recognized by the state beginning on January 1, 1974. After its first year, the SWLS contracted with the Madison Public Library for this purpose instead, effective January 1, 1975.

Since the system's establishment, two public libraries have opened in the region: one in Hazel Green, and one in Dickeyville which was opened in 2006. Additionally, branch libraries have been added in Gratiot and Potosi.

== Participating libraries ==
- Crawford County
  - Gays Mills Public Library, Gays Mills
  - Prairie du Chien Memorial Library, Prairie du Chien
  - Soldiers Grove Public Library, Soldiers Grove
- Grant County
  - Bloomington Public Library, Bloomington
  - Hildebrand Memorial Library, Boscobel
  - Eckstein Memorial Library, Cassville
  - Cuba City Public Library, Cuba City
  - Brickl Memorial Library, Dickeyville
  - Dwight T. Parker Public Library, Fennimore
  - Hazel Green Public Library, Hazel Green
  - Schreiner Memorial Library, Lancaster
    - Potosi Branch, Potosi
  - Allen-Dietzman Public Library, Livingston
  - Montfort Public Library, Montfort
  - Muscoda Public Library, Muscoda
  - Platteville Public Library, Platteville
- Iowa County
  - Barneveld Public Library, Barneveld
  - Cobb Public Library, Cobb
  - Dodgeville Public Library, Dodgeville
  - Mineral Point Public Library, Mineral Point
- Lafayette County
  - Argyle Public Library, Argyle
  - John Turgeson Public Library, Belmont
  - Benton Public Library, Benton
  - Blanchardville Public Library, Blanchardville
  - Johnson Public Library, Darlington
  - McCoy Public Library, Shullsburg
    - Gratiot Annex Library Branch, Gratiot
- Richland County
  - Lone Rock Community Library, Lone Rock
  - Brewer Public Library, Richland Center
  - Viola Public Library, Viola
