= Harlow S. Orton =

American judge (1817–1895)

The Honorable Harlow S. Orton
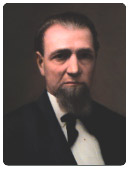

8th Chief Justice of the Wisconsin Supreme Court
- In office January 1, 1894 – July 4, 1895
- Preceded by: William P. Lyon
- Succeeded by: John B. Cassoday

Justice of the Wisconsin Supreme Court
- In office January 1, 1878 – July 4, 1895
- Preceded by: New seat
- Succeeded by: Roujet D. Marshall

Member of the Wisconsin State Assembly from the Dane 5th district
- In office January 1, 1871 – January 1, 1872
- Preceded by: Alden Sprague Sanborn
- Succeeded by: District abolished
- In office January 1, 1859 – January 1, 1860
- Preceded by: Frank Gault
- Succeeded by: Leonard J. Farwell
- In office January 1, 1854 – January 1, 1855
- Preceded by: Mathew Roche
- Succeeded by: Levi Baker Vilas

Personal details
- Born: November 23, 1817 Niagara County, New York, U.S.
- Died: July 4, 1895 (aged 77) Dane County, Wisconsin, U.S.
- Resting place: Forest Hill Cemetery, Madison, Wisconsin
- Party: Democratic (after 1856); (Conservative Democrat); Whig (until 1856)
- Spouse: Elizabeth S. Cheney (m. 1839–1895)
- Children: 4
- Education: Madison University

Harlow South Orton (November 23, 1817 – July 4, 1895) was an American lawyer and judge. He was the 8th Chief Justice of the Wisconsin Supreme Court and served on the court from 1878 until his death. He is chiefly remembered as the author of the Wisconsin Supreme Court opinion Vosburg v. Putney (1890), an important torts case in establishing the scope of liability from battery. Earlier in his career, he served three non-consecutive terms in the Wisconsin State Assembly, representing Madison and central Dane County.

== Background ==
Orton was born in Niagara County, New York, on November 23, 1817, and was educated at the Hamilton Academy and then at Madison University (which later changed its name to Colgate University).

Orton's father was a physician who had been one of the early pioneer settlers of a region of Niagara County, New York that had been part of the Holland Purchase.

In 1837, Orton moved to Kentucky, where he spent a year as a school teacher, before joining his brother Myron, who was a lawyer, in Indiana. Harlow Orton was called to the bar in 1838. Orton practiced law for five years. In 1843, Indiana Governor Samuel Bigger (a Whig) appointed Orton circuit judge for Porter County, Indiana.

Orton served as an Indiana judge for four years. In 1847, he moved to Milwaukee, in the Wisconsin Territory, and again established himself as a private lawyer. In 1852, Orton moved to Madison, Wisconsin, to serve as legal counsel and private secretary for Whig Governor of Wisconsin Leonard J. Farwell.

Orton's brothers John Jay Orton and Myron Orton similarly relocated to Wisconsin.

== Assembly service and the 1855 election ==
He was elected as a Whig member of the Wisconsin State Assembly from Dane County's 5th Assembly district (the then-Village of Madison, and the Towns of Town of Madison, Blooming Grove, "Burk" [sic], Westport, Vienna, and Windsor) in 1853, succeeding Democrat Mathew Roche. Democrat William R. Taylor succeeded him.

In the 1855 Wisconsin gubernatorial election, according to the official canvass, Republican Coles Bashford was narrowly defeated by Democrat William A. Barstow. Bashford sued, however, alleging fraudulent election returns, and was ultimately successful in having the Wisconsin Supreme Court declare him the winner of the election. Orton was Bashford's lawyer in this proceeding.

In 1858, Orton was again elected to the Assembly, succeeding Democrat Frank Gault in a 5th District which now included the Towns of Dane, Vienna, Westport, Springfield, Middleton, and Madison (but only the 1st Ward of the City of Madison), and described his profession as "Capt. of the Dane Cavalry," he was assigned to the standing committees on the judiciary and the militia. In 1859, Orton was appointed judge for the 9th Judicial Circuit to fill the vacancy left by Luther S. Dixon, who became a Wisconsin Supreme Court justice. (Orton was succeeded in the Assembly by Republican Leonard Farwell.) Orton resigned as circuit judge in 1865 and returned to private law practice.

Orton was serving as captain of the Dane County Cavalry at the outbreak of the American Civil War. In a letter to one of his brothers around this time, Orton wrote that he "fully and totally and emphatically" opposed the policies of Abraham Lincoln, who he characterized as war-mongering towards the South which he feared would "destroy all hope of Union forever."

== U.W. Law School and elected offices ==
Orton served as dean of the University of Wisconsin Law School from 1869 to 1874. He was elected a final time to the Assembly in 1870, this time unopposed, as one of several "people's" candidates; he described himself as "a conservative democrat, or democratic-whig, or independent, [who] believes in a strong government of the people". (Democratic incumbent Alden Sanborn was not running for re-election.) He was succeeded in 1871 (the Assembly having been redistricted in the meantime) by Democrat John D. Gurnee. Orton ran for Congress in 1876 as a Democrat, against Republican incumbent Lucien B. Caswell, but lost by 348 votes (0.55% of the vote); and served one term as mayor of Madison in 1877.

== Supreme Court ==
In 1877, Wisconsin amended its constitution to create two additional seats on the Supreme Court, and Orton was elected. Orton became the chief justice when Chief Justice William Lyon retired in 1894.

Orton served on the Supreme Court until he died on July 4, 1895. He and his wife, Elizabeth Cheney, had four children.

Wisconsin State Assembly
| Preceded by Mathew Roche | Member of the Wisconsin State Assembly from the Dane 5th district January 1, 1854 – January 1, 1855 | Succeeded by Levi Baker Vilas |
| Preceded by Frank Gault | Member of the Wisconsin State Assembly from the Dane 5th district January 1, 1859 – January 1, 1860 | Succeeded by Leonard J. Farwell |
| Preceded by Alden Sprague Sanborn | Member of the Wisconsin State Assembly from the Dane 5th district January 1, 1871 – January 1, 1872 | District abolished |
Legal offices
| New seat | Justice of the Wisconsin Supreme Court; January 1, 1878 – July 4, 1895 | Succeeded by Roujet D. Marshall |
| Preceded by William P. Lyon | Chief Justice of the Wisconsin Supreme Court; January 1, 1894 – July 4, 1895 | Succeeded by John B. Cassoday |
