= Matthew Roche =

Matthew Roche may refer to:

- Matthew Roche (bishop), Irish Roman Catholic bishop
- Matthew Roche (politician), member of the Wisconsin State Assembly

== See also ==
- Mathew Jay Roach, American filmmaker
