= Silas U. Pinney =

American politician and jurist (1833–1899)

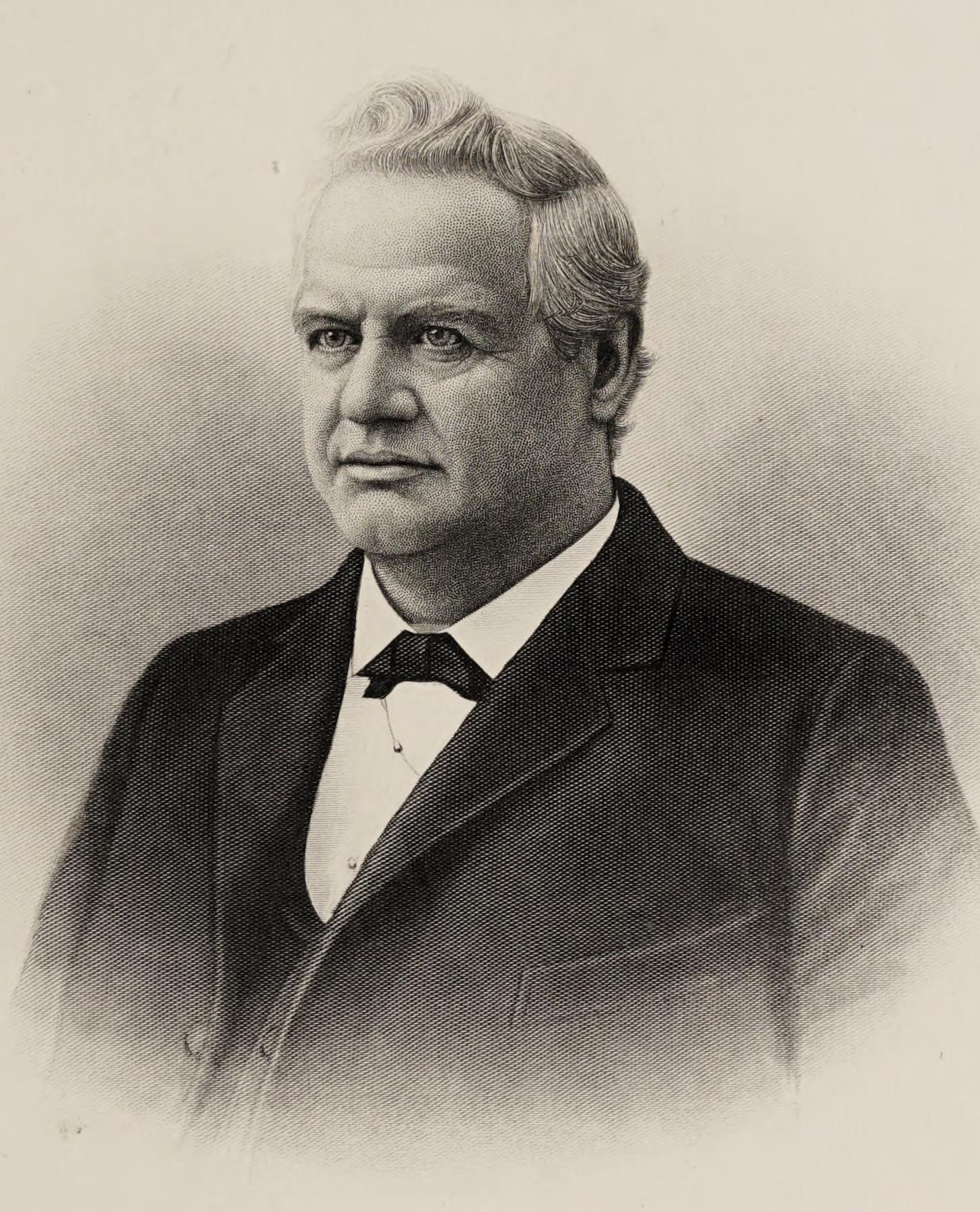
- Portrait from History of the Bench and Bar of Wisconsin (1898)

Justice of the Wisconsin Supreme Court
- In office January 5, 1892 – November 22, 1898
- Preceded by: Orsamus Cole
- Succeeded by: Joshua Eric Dodge

13th Mayor of Madison, Wisconsin
- In office April 1874 – April 1876
- Preceded by: Jared Comstock Gregory
- Succeeded by: John N. Jones

Member of the Wisconsin State Assembly from the Dane 2nd district
- In office January 4, 1875 – January 3, 1876
- Preceded by: Philo Dunning
- Succeeded by: William Charlton

Personal details
- Born: Silas Uriah Pinney; March 3, 1833 Rockdale Township, Pennsylvania, U.S.
- Died: April 1, 1899 (aged 66) Madison, Wisconsin, U.S.
- Resting place: Forest Hill Cemetery, Madison
- Party: Democratic
- Spouse: Mary Melissa Mullikan (m. 1856–1899)
- Children: Clarence H. Pinney^{(b. 1859; died 1879)}; Bessie E. Pinney^{(adopted; died 1891)}

Silas Uriah Pinney (March 3, 1833 – April 1, 1899) was an American lawyer, jurist, and Democratic politician from Madison, Wisconsin. He was a justice of the Wisconsin Supreme Court from 1892 through 1898, and served as the 13th mayor of Madison. Outside of public office, Pinney was a renowned lawyer and legal scholar; he was the compiler and namesake of Pinney's Wisconsin Reports (Pin.), which are the official catalogue of Wisconsin (territory and state) Supreme Court decisions from 1838 through 1853. He also played an important role investing in the early development of the city of Madison; his mayoral term saw the establishment of the first public library in the city—the second public library in the state. He is the namesake of the Pinney Branch of the Madison Public Library.

His name was often abbreviated as S. U. Pinney.

== Early life and legal career ==
Silas Pinney was born in Rockdale Township, Pennsylvania, in March 1833. He was raised and educated there until age 13, when he moved west with his parents, settling in Dane County, Wisconsin Territory, in 1846. His father purchased land for a farm in what is now Windsor, Wisconsin, where they became some of the first settlers in the town. There was little educational infrastructure in the new settlement, so Pinney was mostly self-taught for the next several years, relying on whatever books were available from his parents or neighbors.

At age 16, Pinney decided to pursue a career in law and began teaching school to earn money; he taught school for three winters, using all of his spare time to study whatever legal texts were available to him in the rural town. He was accepted as a student to read law in the law office of Levi Baker Vilas & H. W. Remington in nearby Madison, Wisconsin, in April 1853, and he was admitted to the bar less than a year later.

After his bar admission, he was accepted as a partner in the firm of his former instructors, and the business was subsequently known as Vilas, Roys, & Pinney, with the third partner being Samuel H. Roys. That law firm still exists in Madison, now known as Bell Moore & Richter SC. Vilas retired from the firm in 1856, and Roys died in 1857; Pinney subsequently partnered with J. C. Gregory and Chauncey Abbott. Abbott retired in 1863, but Pinney and Gregory continued together until 1879. In 1880, Pinney took on Arthur Loomis Sanborn as a junior partner, and that partnership continued until Pinney's election to the Wisconsin Supreme Court in 1891.

In his legal practice, Pinney was described by contemporary Edwin E. Bryant as a master of legal procedure, earning him a high reputation among his colleagues. Before his election to the high court, he was a prolific litigant before the Wisconsin Supreme Court; at the time of his death, it was remarked that his name appeared in all but two of the first 100 volumes of the Wisconsin Reports, cataloguing the major decisions of the Wisconsin Supreme Court through its first 50 years.

Pinney's name is also immortalized in Wisconsin legal history as the compiler of reports of the decisions of the Wisconsin Territory Supreme Court and the first Wisconsin Supreme Court, covering the years 1838 to 1853. The reports are generally referred to as Pinney's Wisconsin Reports and are abbreviated as "Pin." in legal reference.

== Public office ==
Pinney won his first public office in the Spring of 1858, when he was elected Madison city attorney. In the Fall of 1860, he was the Democratic Party nominee for Dane County district attorney, but lost the general election to Elisha W. Keyes.

In the years leading up to the American Civil War, Pinney became active in the Wisconsin militia, and served as adjutant of Wisconsin's 18th militia regiment. Pinney did not volunteer for service in the war, but did contribute financially to benefits for Union Army volunteers.

Politically, Pinney was a supporter of Stephen A. Douglas, and remained active in the Democratic Party throughout the Civil War. In 1864, he was elected to the Madison City Council, to replace J. M. Dickinson, who resigned mid-term.

In the latter half of the 1860s, Pinney's legal and political reputation had grown such that he began earning discussion for high office. He was selected by the Wisconsin Supreme Court to compile volume XVI of the Wisconsin Reports in 1865. He was mentioned as aspiring to the Wisconsin Supreme Court in 1868, and in 1869 he won the Democratic nomination for Attorney General of Wisconsin. During the campaign Pinney was accused of having previously served as an officer of a Know Nothing club in Madison, but it's not clear if the accusation was true. Pinney lost the general election, along with the entire state Democratic ticket, receiving about 46.5% of the vote.

The following year, Pinney received another honor from the state Supreme Court when they appointed him special reporter to compile and publish the collected decisions of the Wisconsin Territory Supreme Court and the first state Supreme Court. Pinney completed the work in 1876, published in three volumes referred to as Pinney's Wisconsin Reports (Pin.). Pinney's Reports remain the definitive history of Wisconsin's jurisprudence between 1838 and 1853.

Pinney returned to public office in 1874, when he was elected mayor of Madison. Pinney was functionally unopposed in the election, as the Republicans had failed to nominate a candidate at their convention. Republicans finally named Hiram Giles as a candidate the day before the election; Giles was out of town at the time. In the final tabulation, Giles still received 33% of the vote. That fall, Dane County Democrats nominated Pinney as their candidate for Wisconsin State Assembly in Dane County's 2nd Assembly district. At the time, the district comprised the city of Madison and a strip of rural towns in central Dane County. Republicans in the district mocked the Democrats for nominating Pinney, an elite lawyer who often represented railroad companies, at a time when their party's key political issue was railroad regulation. Nevertheless, Pinney won the election and represented his district in the 28th Wisconsin Legislature.

One of the major events in the 28th Legislature was the election of a United States senator. Incumbent Republican Matthew H. Carpenter sought re-election, but he faced a rebellion from a segment of disgruntled legislative Republicans that left him without a majority. The stalemate dragged on into February. Pinney initially stuck with his party's preferred Senate candidate, Edward S. Bragg, but eventually compromised with anti-Carpenter Republicans to elect Angus Cameron. The following Spring, Pinney was re-nominated by Madison Democrats for another term as mayor and also received the endorsement of Angus Cameron and the Madison Republicans due to his support of Cameron's election as U.S. senator. With both major parties supporting him, he won a second mayoral term without opposition. He did not run for re-election to the Assembly that Fall.

While serving as mayor, Pinney also personally outfitted a firefighter unit in the city, which was named the "S. U. Pinney Supply Hose Company". During Pinney's first term as mayor, the city approved an ordinance to utilize a recent act of the state legislature to implement a public library in the city, known as the Madison Free Library. The library opened in a public ceremony on May 31, 1875; speakers at the event included Pinney, then-University of Wisconsin president John Bascom, and then-state Superintendent of Public Instruction Edward Searing.

Pinney ran for a third term as mayor in 1876, and again received the Republican endorsement. The Democrats, however, nominated hardware dealer John N. Jones. Jones narrowly won the general election, defeating Pinney by 29 votes.

Pinney did not stand for partisan elected office again. Over the next 15 years he continued to bolster his legal reputation, and he was often mentioned as a candidate for Wisconsin Supreme Court. When two new seats were created on the Supreme Court in 1878, and legislative party leaders compromised on each nominating one candidate for the two new seats, Pinney's name was placed in nomination for the Democratic seat, but he was ultimately not selected. Pinney was also encouraged to run for the Madison-area Wisconsin circuit court seat in 1890, but declined.

When it was rumored in 1890 that Wisconsin chief justice Orsamus Cole would retire at the end of his term, Pinney was again discussed as a top contender to succeed him. He formally launched his campaign in December 1890, and quickly secured the support of the vast majority of the state and regional bar associations.

Pinney's campaign had strong Republican support, but struggled to unify the Democrats. Catholic leaders in the Democratic Party initially attempted to organize against his candidacy, accusing him of supporting the use of the protestant bible in school instruction, but Pinney eventually placated the Catholic groups and earned their endorsement. The last lingering opposition to his candidacy came from the Democrats in the Milwaukee Journal, who took issue with Pinney's legal representation of the Republican former state treasurers Edward C. McFetridge and Henry B. Harshaw, who faced a politically-charged prosecution from the Democratic attorney general, James L. O'Connor, over an allegation of embezzlement. Democratic discontent with Pinney ultimately launched a campaign for former circuit judge Eleazor H. Ellis. Ellis ultimately ran a strong campaign, but Pinney prevailed with 55% of the vote.

Pinney took office in January 1892, but could not serve his entire term; he retired in November 1898 due to poor health. Pinney died about four months later; after struggling with edema, he died somewhat suddenly on April 1, 1899, at his home in Madison.

== Personal life and legacy ==
Silas Pinney was one of three children born to Justin Chapman Pinney and his wife Mary Polly (née Miller). His father, Justin Pinney, served as Windsor town chairman in 1854 and was an ex officio member of the Dane County Board of Supervisors. The Pinney family were descended from English colonists who settled in the Connecticut Colony in the 1640s.

On March 3, 1856, Silas Pinney married Mary Melissa Mulliken at Colesburg, Iowa. They had one son together, Clarence, but he died young at age 20 in 1879. After their son's death, they adopted a daughter, Bessie, who also died young in an accident of a runaway horse-drawn carriage in 1891.

Silas Pinney is the namesake of the Pinney Branch of the Madison Public Library, on the east side of the city of Madison. The naming is due to Pinney's role in establishing the first public library in Madison.

== Electoral history ==
=== Wisconsin Attorney General (1869) ===
1869 Wisconsin Attorney General election
| Party | Candidate | Votes | % | ±% |
|---|---|---|---|---|
General Election, November 2, 1869
| Republican | Stephen Steele Barlow | 69,746 | 53.53% | +1.88pp |
| Democratic | Silas U. Pinney | 60,520 | 46.45% | −1.90pp |
| | Scattering | 17 | 0.01% | |
| Plurality | | 9,226 | 7.08% | 3.78pp |
| Total votes | | 130,283 | 100.0% | -8.48% |
| Republican hold | | | | |

=== Madison Mayor (1874, 1875, 1876) ===
1874 Madison mayoral election
| Party | Candidate | Votes | % | ±% |
|---|---|---|---|---|
General Election, April 7, 1874
| Democratic | Silas U. Pinney | 1,015 | 66.78% | |
| Republican | Hiram Giles | 505 | 33.22% | |
| Plurality | | 510 | 33.55% | |
| Total votes | | 1,520 | 100.0% | |
| Democratic hold | | | | |

1876 Madison mayoral election
| Party | Candidate | Votes | % | ±% |
|---|---|---|---|---|
General Election, April 4, 1876
| Democratic | John N. Jones | 879 | 50.84% | |
| Independent Democrat | Silas U. Pinney (incumbent) | 850 | 49.16% | |
| Plurality | | 29 | 1.68% | |
| Total votes | | 1,729 | 100.0% | |
| Democratic hold | | | | |

=== Wisconsin Assembly (1874) ===
Wisconsin Assembly, Dane 2nd District Election, 1874
| Party | Candidate | Votes | % | ±% |
|---|---|---|---|---|
General Election, November 3, 1874
| Democratic | Silas U. Pinney | 1,389 | 52.95% | −5.29pp |
| Republican | William Vroman | 1,234 | 47.05% | |
| Plurality | | 155 | 5.91% | -10.58pp |
| Total votes | | 2,623 | 100.0% | +10.07% |
| Democratic hold | | | | |

=== Wisconsin Supreme Court (1891) ===
1891 Wisconsin Supreme Court election
| Party | Candidate | Votes | % | ±% |
|---|---|---|---|---|
General Election, April 7, 1891
| Nonpartisan | Silas U. Pinney | 96,661 | 54.90% | |
| Nonpartisan | Eleazor H. Ellis | 77,312 | 43.91% | |
| | Scattering | 2,082 | 1.18% | |
| Total votes | | 176,055 | 100.0% | |

== Published works ==
- Pinney, S. U., ed. (1872). Reports of cases argued and determined in the Supreme Court of the Territory of Wisconsin. Vol. 1. Chicago: Callaghan & Co.
- Pinney, S. U., ed. (1874). Reports of cases argued and determined in the Supreme Court of the Territory of Wisconsin and in the Supreme Court of the State of Wisconsin. Vol. 2. Chicago: Callaghan & Co.
- Pinney, S. U., ed. (1876). Reports of cases argued and determined in the Supreme Court of the State of Wisconsin. Vol. 3. Chicago: Callaghan & Co.

== Notes ==
Party political offices
| Preceded by L. P. Weatherby | Democratic nominee for Attorney General of Wisconsin; 1869 | Succeeded by Edward S. Bragg |
Wisconsin State Assembly
| Preceded by Philo Dunning | Member of the Wisconsin State Assembly from the Dane 2nd district January 4, 1875 – January 3, 1876 | Succeeded by William Charlton |
Political offices
| Preceded by Jared Comstock Gregory | Mayor of Madison, Wisconsin; 1874 – 1876 | Succeeded by John N. Jones |
Legal offices
| Preceded by Orsamus Cole | Justice of the Wisconsin Supreme Court; 1892 – 1898 | Succeeded by Joshua Eric Dodge |
