= WRLS =

WRLS could refer to:

- WRLS-FM, a radio station (92.3 FM) in Hayward, Wisconsin, United States
- Winding Rivers Library System, a public library system based in La Crosse, Wisconsin, United States
- WeatherTech Raceway Laguna Seca, a Racetrack in Monterey, California, United States
