= Gurnee (surname) =

Gurnee is a surname. Notable people with the surname include:

- Augustus C. Gurnee (1855–1926), American socialite and art patron;
- Hal Gurnee (born 1935), American television director;
- John D. Gurnee (1831–1906), American politician and lawyer;
- Walter S. Gurnee (1813–1903), American politician.
