= Levi Baker Vilas =

American politician (1811–1879)

Levi B. Vilas
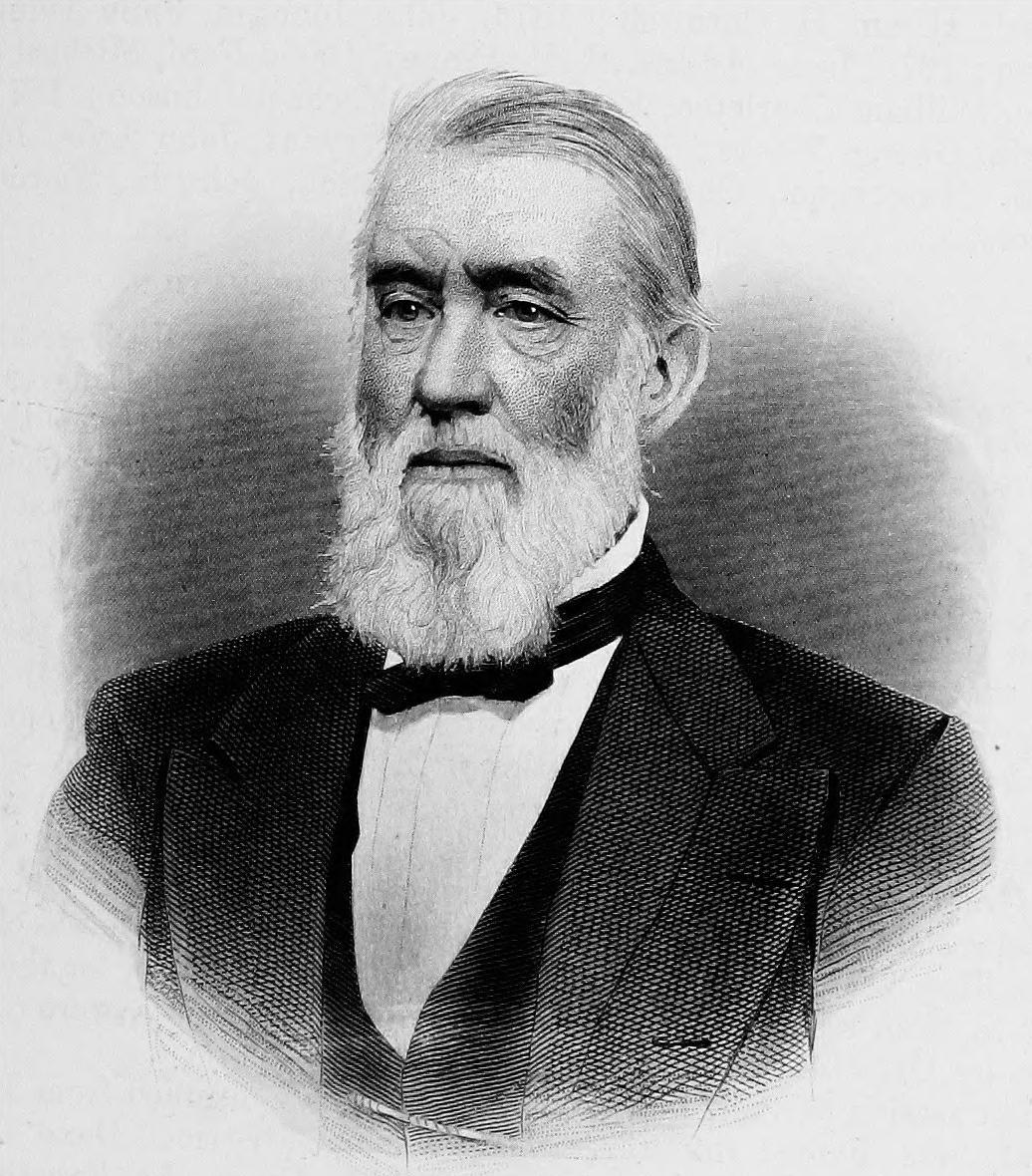

4th Mayor of Madison, Wisconsin
- In office April 1861 – April 1862
- Preceded by: George Baldwin Smith
- Succeeded by: William T. Leitch

Member of the Wisconsin State Assembly from the Dane 2nd district
- In office January 6, 1873 – January 5, 1874
- Preceded by: John D. Gurnee
- Succeeded by: Philo Dunning

Member of the Wisconsin State Assembly from the Dane 5th district
- In office January 6, 1868 – January 4, 1869
- Preceded by: Eleazer Wakeley
- Succeeded by: George Baldwin Smith
- In office January 1, 1855 – January 7, 1856
- Preceded by: Harlow S. Orton
- Succeeded by: Augustus A. Bird

Member of the Vermont Senate from the Orange County district
- In office October 9, 1845 – October 14, 1847 Serving with Horace Fified & Reuben Page
- Preceded by: Ebenezer Bass & Lorin Griswold
- Succeeded by: Henry Keyes, Jefferson P. Kidder, & William Sweatt

Member of the Vermont House of Representatives
- In office October 8, 1840 – October 10, 1844
- Constituency: Orange County
- In office October 13, 1836 – October 1838
- Constituency: Franklin County

Personal details
- Born: Levi Baker Vilas; February 25, 1811 Lamoille County, Vermont, U.S.
- Died: February 6, 1879 (aged 67) Madison, Wisconsin, U.S.
- Cause of death: Pneumonia
- Resting place: Forest Hill Cemetery, Madison, Wisconsin
- Party: Democratic; Anti-Masonic (1834–1836)
- Spouse: Esther Green Smilie (m. 1834)
- Children: Nathan Smilie Vilas^{(b. 1838; died 1839)}; William Freeman Vilas^{(b. 1840; died 1908)}; Henry M. Vilas^{(b. 1842; died 1872)}; Levi M. Vilas^{(b. 1844; died 1889)}; Unnamed son^{(b. 1844; died 1844)}; Charles Harrison Vilas^{(b. 1846; died 1920)}; Frederick Vilas^{(b. 1850; deid 1851)}; Edward Perrin Vilas^{(b. 1852; died 1912)}; Ira Hill Vilas^{(b. 1863; died 1863)}; Esther Vilas^{(b. 1865; died 1885)}
- Parents: Moses Vilas (father); Mercy (Flint) Vilas (mother)
- Relatives: Martin Flint (uncle); Martin S. Vilas (nephew); Joseph Vilas (cousin)
- Profession: Lawyer, banker, politician

Levi Baker Vilas (February 25, 1811 – February 6, 1879) was an American lawyer, banker, Democratic politician, and Wisconsin pioneer. He was the 4th mayor of Madison, Wisconsin, and represented central Dane County for three terms in the Wisconsin State Assembly (1855, 1868, & 1873). He was a major investor in the early development of the city of Madison, and was one of the founders of the company that became Madison Gas and Electric.

Before moving to Wisconsin, he was one of the leading Democrats in the state of Vermont during the 1830s and 1840s, serving two years in the Vermont Senate and six years in the Vermont House of Representatives, and serving as a candidate for U.S. House of Representatives in 1844 and U.S. Senate in 1848.

He was the father of William Freeman Vilas, who served as a U.S. senator from Wisconsin and became the 33rd United States Postmaster General and 17th U.S. Secretary of the Interior.

== Early life and career in Vermont ==
Levi Baker Vilas was born in Randolph, Vermont, in 1811. He was raised and educated in Vermont; he received an academic education and then attended college, but withdrew due to poor health. He subsequently studied law; he was admitted to the bar at St. Albans, Vermont, in 1833, and began his legal practice at Morrisville, Vermont. At Morrisville, Vilas became active in politics with the Anti-Masonic Party. He was appointed the first postmaster in that town in 1834, but resigned in the fall when he relocated to Johnson, Vermont.

At Johnson, Vilas grew in political prominence. He was pushed by the Anti-Masonic Party as a candidate for clerk of the Vermont House of Representatives in the fall of 1835, as part of an attempted political coalition with the Whigs, but the deal ultimately failed and Vilas was not elected. That winter, he was a delegate to Vermont's 1836 constitutional convention, where he was elected to serve as assistant secretary.

In the fall of 1836, Vilas was elected to represent the town of Johnson in the Vermont House of Representatives for the 1836–1837 term, running on the Democratic Party ticket. During his term in the House, he was appointed a register of probate for Lamoille County, Vermont. He was elected to another term in the House of Representatives in the fall of 1837. During the 1837–1838 term, Vilas was elected one of the state commissioners for the deaf and dumb.

In 1838, he moved to Chelsea, Vermont, in Orange County. From Orange County, Vilas was elected to four more terms in the Vermont House of Representatives, serving from October 1840 through October 1844. During this four year period, he was one of the leading Democrats in the House, but was consistently in the minority. During these years, Vilas also became involved in banking and was one of the founders of the Orange County Bank in 1843. During these years, he was also appointed judge of probate in Orange County.

In 1844, Vilas was the Democratic nominee for U.S. House of Representatives in Vermont's 2nd congressional district, running against incumbent Whig Jacob Collamer. After a vigorous campaign, Collamer was re-elected with 55% of the vote; Vilas received just 35%.

The following year, Vilas ran for a seat in the Vermont Senate and was elected along with his entire Democratic slate in Orange County. He was re-elected in 1846. He did not run for re-election in 1847, but continued to serve as judge of probate.

In the 1848, he was a delegate to the Democratic National Convention in Baltimore, and served on the credentials committee there. The Democratic Party in Vermont, already a minority in those years, was further reduced in 1848 by the split of the Free Soil Party over the issue of expanding slavery into territory acquired in the Mexican Cession. In the summer, Vilas was chosen to serve on Vermont's Democratic slate of presidential electors, but their slate came in a distant third in the Vermont voting for presidential electors, behind the Whig and Free Soil slates. That fall, Vilas was also the Democratic nominee for United States senator, but the Democrats remained a small minority of the Vermont Legislature and had no realistic chance of electing their candidate; the incumbent Whig, William Upham, was easily re-elected in both chambers of the legislature. The party's position in Vermont continued to erode over the next several years as they lost their few strongholds in the state.

Vilas served as a delegate to the 1850 Vermont constitutional convention. He ran again for Vermont House of Representatives in the fall of 1850, but the election was tainted by allegations of fraud. After Vilas was declared the apparent winner of the election, evidence of fraud came to light; both Democrats and Whigs accused each other of committing the fraud, but Vilas declined to take his seat in the Legislature.

== Wisconsin career ==
Less than a year after the 1850 election fiasco, Vilas went west to the new state of Wisconsin and took up residence in the capitol, Madison, Wisconsin. On arriving in Madison, he initially focused on his legal practice, starting a law firm from which the present day law firm of Bell, Moore & Richter, S.C. draws its roots. Vilas quickly diversified his interests, speculating in real estate and other financial opportunities in the new state. In 1852, he was one of the chief investors, along with Leonard J. Farwell and Jairus C. Fairchild, in establishing a hotel in Madison; the hotel was constructed and opened in 1853 as the Vilas House hotel. This was an exceptionally lucrative investment, as the Vilas House became one of the principal boarding places for Wisconsin legislators when the legislature was in session.

In the summer of 1853, he was one of the witnesses called in the impeachment trial of Wisconsin circuit court judge Levi Hubbell, testifying that he had been told to pay a certain amount of money to have an injunction lifted in a case.

Vilas quickly grew in influence in Madison and resumed his political activities with the Democratic Party of Wisconsin. He was first nominated for Wisconsin State Assembly in 1853, in Dane County's 5th Assembly district, comprising Madison and the north-central part of the county. The Democratic Party in the state was divided that year, however, with the incumbent Democratic state representative Matthew Roche splitting the Democratic vote in that district; the seat was won instead by Whig Harlow S. Orton, running as an independent. Vilas ran again the next year, however, and was elected to the 8th Wisconsin Legislature. During that term, the legislature elected him to also serve as a regent of the University of Wisconsin.

Also in 1854, Vilas deployed another major investment, becoming one of the founders of the Dane County Bank, working again in partnership with Leonard J. Farwell, and was named the first president of the bank. The following year, he and Farwell were partners in establishing the Madison Gas Light and Coke Company and the Madison Hydraulic Company. During these years, he also became a contributor to the Wisconsin Historical Society and an officer in the Dane County Agricultural Society.

Vilas's first term in the Assembly led to a split between him and then-governor William A. Barstow, who wielded considerable power in the state Democratic apparatus. In 1856, Vilas sought the Democratic nomination for Wisconsin Senate in the newly-created 26th Senate district, then comprising roughly the western half of Dane County. At a spirited convention, the nomination instead went to George P. Thompson. Vilas later alleged that the convention delegates, due to loyalty to Barstow, had acted against the intent of the voters who had elected them by refusing to nominate him for state Senate. He referred to that alleged betrayal when launching an independent run for Assembly in 1858, challenging Harlow S. Orton, who was then the regular Democratic nominee. Orton won the election. Vilas's schism with the Barstow organization would leave him with little influence until the political situation was upended again by the start of the American Civil War.

In 1861, Vilas was nominated for mayor of Madison by both the Democratic city convention and the Union convention. The Republicans ultimately did not nominate a candidate to run against Vilas, and he was elected without opposition. The outbreak of the Civil War roughly coincided with Vilas's election, and his term was mostly taken up with measures to maintain the peace and security in Madison, and to manage the influx of volunteers for the Union Army. Vilas sought another term in 1862, but his renomination faced significant opposition at the Union convention in March. After a contentious session, the convention dissolved without nominating. The city Democratic convention nominated William T. Leitch, an avowed anti-war Democrat. Without official nomination, Vilas ran as an independent candidate with informal Republican support, but lost the election to Leitch. Shortly after leaving office, he was appointed to serve on the draft board for Dane County by new governor Edward Salomon.

Throughout the war, Vilas remained active in the Democratic Party. In 1865, he received the Democratic Party nomination for Secretary of State of Wisconsin. The entire Democratic ticket was defeated, however; Vilas received about 45% of the vote. Vilas was a delegate to the 1866 National Union Convention after the war, attempting to shore up the administration of Andrew Johnson. In 1867, Vilas ran for Assembly again, and was elected to serve in the 21st Wisconsin Legislature; he still represented Dane County's 5th Assembly district, but the boundaries had changed somewhat since 1855, comprising just the city and town of Madison.

Vilas ran for state Senate in the 26th Senate district again in 1869. He won the Democratic nomination, but faced lingering dissent from within his own party. In the end, he lost the general election by 110 votes to Romanzo E. Davis. Vilas won his final term in elected office in 1872, to serve in the Assembly for the 26th Wisconsin Legislature.

Though he never held public office again, Vilas remained active in Democratic politics up to just a few weeks before his death. Vilas died in Madison on February 6, 1879, after suffering from acute pneumonia. He was buried at Forest Hill Cemetery.

== Personal life and family ==
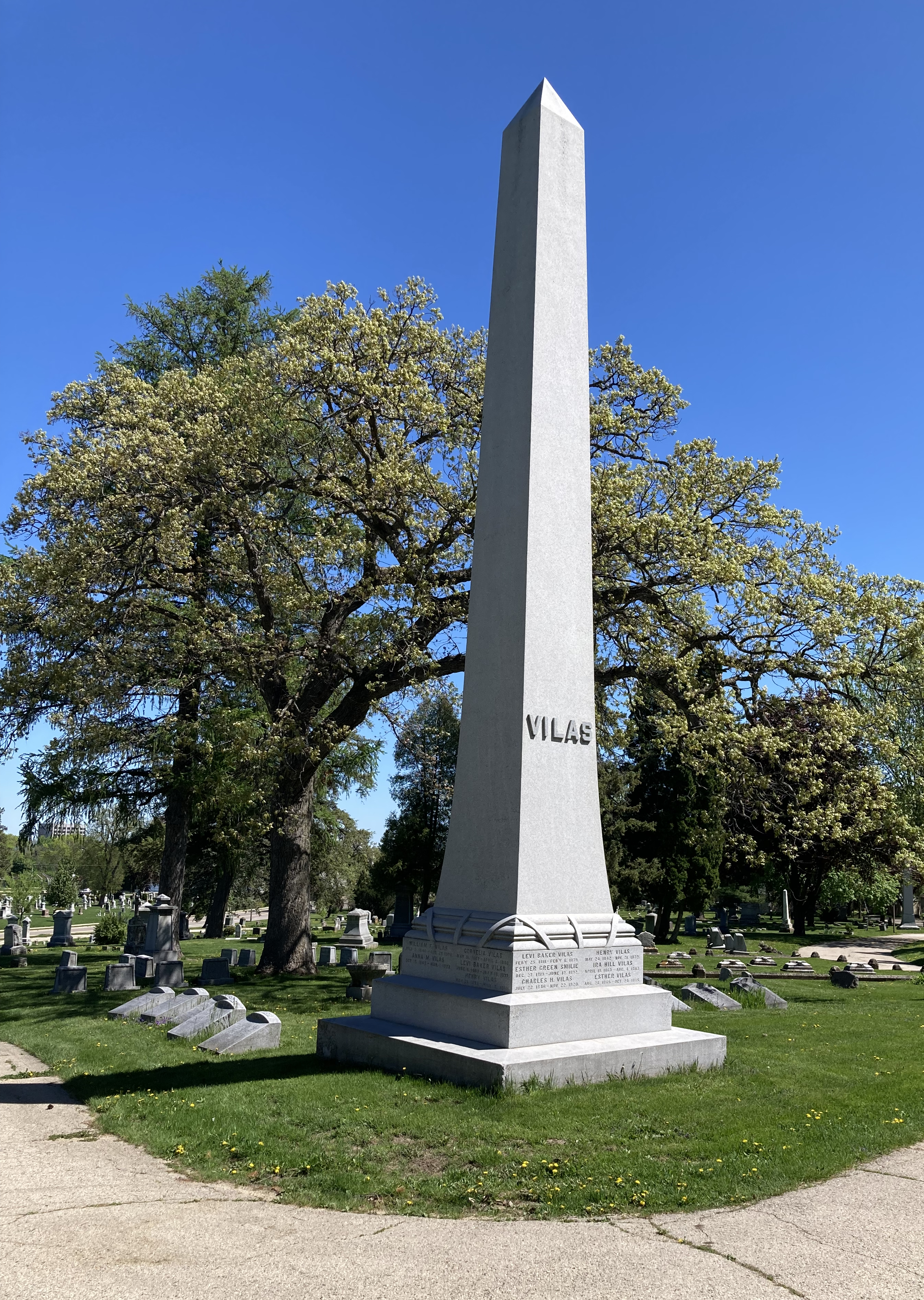
Vilas's grave at Forest Hill Cemetery

Levi Baker Vilas was the 8th of 10 children born to Moses Vilas (1771–1849) and his wife Mercy (née Flint; 1777–1861). Moses Vilas was one of the earliest settlers in Lamoille County, Vermont, and a prominent and successful farmer in the area; he also served a number of local offices, including town clerk and justice of the peace. Levi's mother, Mercy Flint, was an elder sister of Vermont adjutant general Martin Flint. The Vilas family were descended from Peter Vilas (1704–1756), who emigrated from England to the Massachusetts Bay Colony in the early 1700s.

On October 10, 1837, Levi Baker Vilas married Esther Green Smilie at Cambridge, Vermont. Esther was a daughter of Nathan Smilie, a prominent Vermont Democrat who ran for governor in the 1839 election. They had ten children together, but four died in infancy; they were married for over 40 years before Levi's death in 1879.

- Their eldest surviving son was William Freeman Vilas, who served as an officer in the Union Army during the American Civil War, rising to the rank of lieutenant colonel. After the war he became a prominent Democrat in Wisconsin. He was appointed United States Postmaster General by President Grover Cleveland in 1885, then appointed U.S. Secretary of the Interior in 1888. After the Democrats gained control of the Wisconsin Legislature in 1890, Vilas was elected U.S. senator from Wisconsin.
- Their next eldest son, Henry, also served as an officer in the Union Army and rose to the rank of captain of Co. A in the 23rd Wisconsin Infantry Regiment. He became a lawyer in Appleton, Wisconsin, but died of a heart attack at age 30.
- A third son, Levi Madison Vilas, also became a lawyer and had a prominent career in Eau Claire, serving as mayor and district attorney. Later he moved to Saint Paul, Minnesota, and was appointed a district court judge in that county. He died of kidney disease at age 45.
- Their longest surviving child was Charles Harrison Vilas, who became a homeopathic doctor and had a long career as a physician and educator. He became president of the Hahnemann Medical College in Chicago, was later a regent of the University of Wisconsin, and was a prominent philanthropist in Madison.
- Edward Perrin Vilas also became a prominent lawyer. He married the youngest daughter of David Atwood, the long-time publisher of the Wisconsin State Journal.
- Esther "Ettie" Vilas was their only daughter and their last-born child. She died of a sudden illness (possibly tuberculosis) at age 20.

Vilas's former home in Madison is located in what is now the Langdon Street Historic District.

== Electoral history ==
=== U.S. House (1844) ===
Vermont's 2nd Congressional District Election, 1844
Party	Candidate	Votes	%	±%
General Election, September 3, 1844
Whig	Jacob Collamer (incumbent)	7,108	54.99%	+6.13pp
Democratic	Levi Baker Vilas	4,527	35.02%	−5.52pp
Liberty	Titus Hutchinson	1,189	9.20%	+0.78pp
	Scattering	102	0.79%	
Plurality		2,581	19.97%	+11.65pp
Total votes		12,926	100.0%	+8.43%
Whig hold				

=== Madison Mayor (1861, 1862) ===
Madison Mayoral Election, 1861
Party	Candidate	Votes	%	±%
General Election, April 2, 1861
Democratic	Levi Baker Vilas	967	83.22%	
	Scattering	195		
Total votes			100.0%	
Democratic hold				

Madison Mayoral Election, 1862
Party	Candidate	Votes	%	±%
General Election, April 1, 1862
Democratic	William T. Leitch	770	55.44%	
Independent Democrat	Levi Baker Vilas (incumbent)	619	44.56%	
Plurality		151	10.87%	
Total votes		1,389	100.0%	+19.54%
Democratic hold				

=== Wisconsin Secretary of State (1865) ===
Wisconsin Secretary of State Election, 1865
Party	Candidate	Votes	%	±%
General Election, November 7, 1865
Republican	Thomas S. Allen	58,619	55.04%	−4.75pp
Democratic	Levi Baker Vilas	47,874	44.96%	
Plurality		10,745	10.09%	-9.50pp
Total votes		106,493	100.0%	-12.73%
Republican hold				

=== Wisconsin Senate (1869) ===
Wisconsin Senate, 26th District Election, 1869
Party	Candidate	Votes	%	±%
General Election, November 2, 1869
Republican	Romanzo E. Davis	2,256	51.25%	
Democratic	Levi Baker Vilas	2,146	48.75%	
Plurality		110	2.50%	
Total votes		4,402	100.0%	
Republican gain from Democratic				

Party political offices
Preceded by Emil Rothe	Democratic nominee for Secretary of State of Wisconsin; 1865	Succeeded by Emil Rothe
Vermont Senate
Preceded by Ebenezer Bass & Lorin Griswold	Member of the Vermont Senate from the Orange County district October 9, 1845 – October 14, 1847; Served alongside: Horace Fified & Reuben Page	Succeeded by Henry Keyes, Jefferson P. Kidder, & William Sweatt
Wisconsin State Assembly
Preceded by Harlow S. Orton	Member of the Wisconsin State Assembly from the Dane 5th district January 1, 1855 – January 7, 1856	Succeeded by Augustus A. Bird
Preceded by Eleazer Wakeley	Member of the Wisconsin State Assembly from the Dane 5th district January 6, 1868 – January 4, 1869	Succeeded by George Baldwin Smith
Preceded by John D. Gurnee	Member of the Wisconsin State Assembly from the Dane 2nd district January 6, 1873 – January 5, 1874	Succeeded by Philo Dunning
Political offices
Preceded by George Baldwin Smith	Mayor of Madison, Wisconsin; 1861 – 1862	Succeeded by William T. Leitch
