= Southwest Wisconsin Technical College =

Technical college in Fennimore, Wisconsin

Southwest Tech
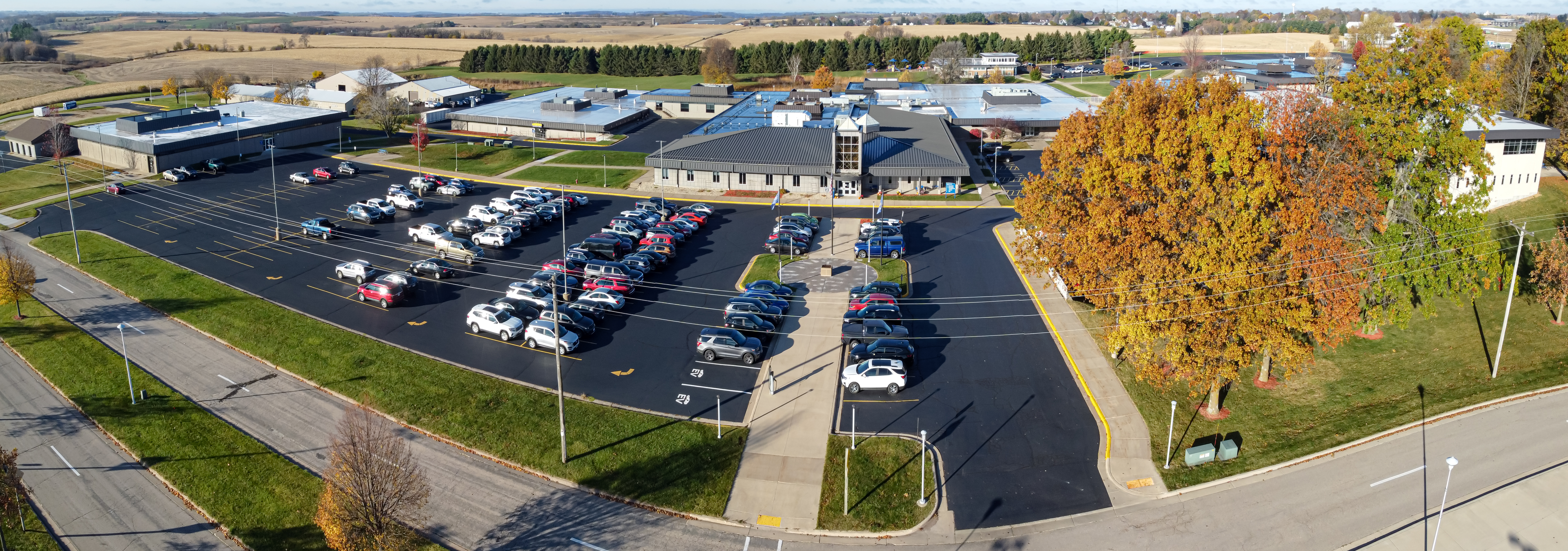
- Type: State Technical College
- President: Jason Wood
- Location: Fennimore, Wisconsin, United States; 42°58′33″N 90°38′14″W
- Campus: Rural
- Website: www.swtc.edu

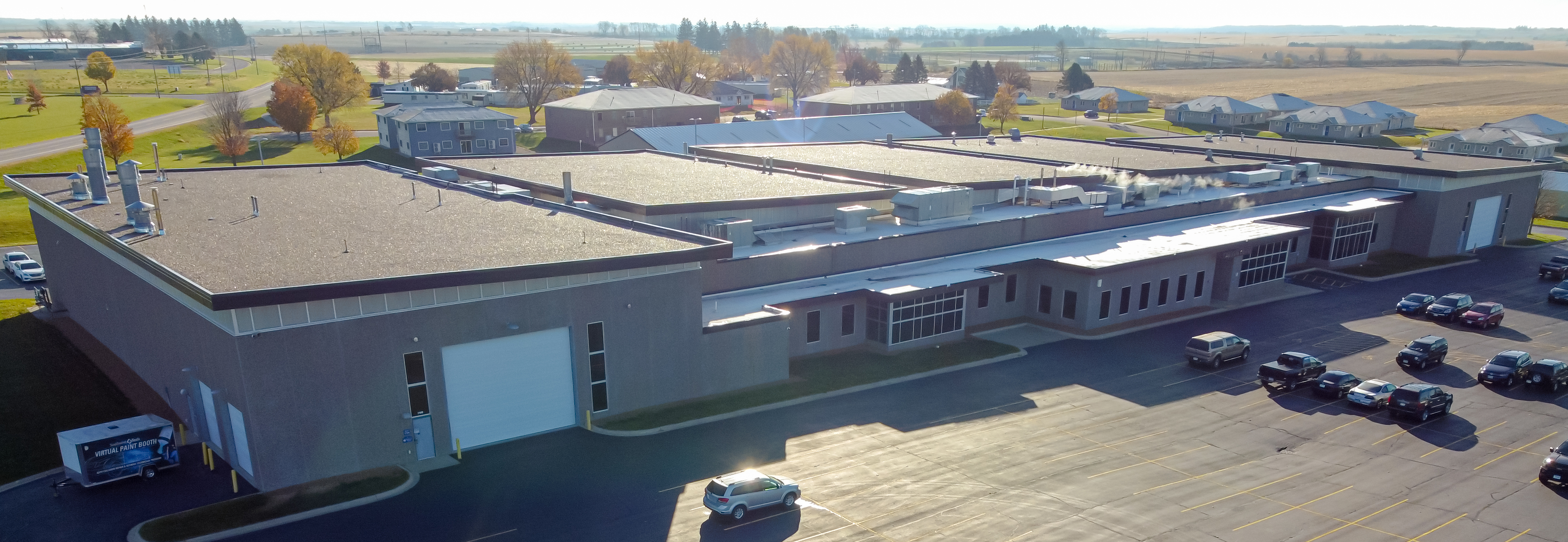
Auto and agriculture building

Southwest Wisconsin Technical College (also Southwest Tech) is a technical college in Fennimore, Wisconsin. The college's district includes the area covered by 30 school districts, including all of Crawford, Grant, Iowa, Lafayette and Richland counties. It also includes parts of Dane, Green, Sauk and Vernon counties. It is a member of the Wisconsin Technical College System. The campus is on U.S. Highway 18.

== History ==
The school became operational on July 1, 1967. It was created by Chapter 292, Laws of Wisconsin of 1965. The first program at the college was Farm Training.

== Accreditations and memberships ==
- Higher Learning Commission
- Wisconsin Educational Approval Board
- National League for Nursing Accreditation Commission
- National Automotive Technician Foundation Automotive Service Excellence (ASE)
- Commission on Accreditation of Allied Health Education Programs
