= Public library systems of Wisconsin =

In the state of Wisconsin, public library systems are not operated by the state, but they are eligible for funding from the Wisconsin Department of Public Instruction. While not required to be, all 382 public libraries (and 87 branch locations of those libraries) in Wisconsin's 72 counties are members of a library system. Under state law, the territories of library systems receiving state funding must consist of one or more whole counties, must not overlap, and must maintain a minimum population of 100,000. Additionally, new library systems may be created only if their territory has a minimum population of 200,000. The law provides for two types of library systems: consolidated systems, which place all libraries in one county under a centralized leadership, and federated systems, which provide services to but do not control the public libraries of one or more counties. As of 2025, all 15 public library systems in Wisconsin are federated.

== History ==
The basis for Wisconsin's public library systems was created by Senate Bill 47, which passed the Wisconsin Legislature in December 1971 and rewrote the chapter of the Wisconsin Statutes dealing with public libraries. The law provided that the Department of Public Instruction could recognize one or more counties as comprising a public library system if they met certain requirements. Each system was required to cover a population of at least 85,000 (with smaller areas provisionally approved on the condition that they reached a population of at least 85,000 in time for the 1980 census), to designate a library in a city with a population of at least 30,000 as its headquarters, and to receive consistent financial support at the local level from participating counties and municipalities. If these requirements were met, the state would give the system 50 cents per year for each resident of the territory, up to $18 per year for each square mile covered by the system, and an additional 7 percent of the total operating expenses of all member libraries.

The first four library systems were approved by the state in 1972, with their certifications taking effect on January 1, 1973. The number of library systems rose to a peak of 17 between 1981 and 2016. The state hoped to encourage all public libraries in all 72 counties to participate in a system. Complete coverage was achieved in 1989, when Florence County joined the Nicolet Federated Library System.

In 2015, the Department of Public Instruction began the Public Library System Redesign Project, intended to study how public library service in the state could be improved. The committee recommended that library systems should consider merging together into larger systems to expand the range of services provided to their members. Since 2015, three library system mergers have occurred, reducing the number of systems from 17 to 15. The Department of Public Instruction recommends that library systems should follow the model of the most recent merger, which created the Prairie Lakes Library System in 2023.

== List of public library systems in Wisconsin ==
=== Current ===
System	Counties	Libraries	Branches
Bridges Library System	Jefferson, Waukesha (2)	24	0
IFLS Library System	Barron, Chippewa, Dunn, Eau Claire, Pepin, Pierce, Polk, Price, Rusk, St. Croix (10)	53	1
Kenosha County Library System	Kenosha (1)	2	8
Manitowoc-Calumet Library System	Calumet, Manitowoc (2)	6	0
Milwaukee County Federated Library System	Milwaukee (1)	15	13
Monarch Library System	Dodge, Ozaukee, Sheboygan, Washington (4)	30	0
Nicolet Federated Library System	Brown, Door, Florence, Kewaunee, Marinette, Menominee, Oconto, Shawano (8)	15	28
Northern Waters Library Service	Ashland, Bayfield, Burnett, Douglas, Iron, Sawyer, Vilas, Washburn (8)	27	3
Outagamie Waupaca Library System	Outagamie, Waupaca (2)	17	0
Prairie Lakes Library System	Racine, Rock, Walworth (3)	22	3
South Central Library System	Adams, Columbia, Dane, Green, Portage, Sauk, Wood (7)	54	12
Southwest Wisconsin Library System	Crawford, Grant, Iowa, Lafayette, Richland (5)	28	2
Winding Rivers Library System	Buffalo, Jackson, Juneau, La Crosse, Monroe, Trempealeau, Vernon (7)	34	6
Winnefox Library System	Fond du Lac, Green Lake, Marquette, Waushara, Winnebago (5)	30	1
Wisconsin Valley Library Service	Clark, Forest, Langlade, Lincoln, Marathon, Oneida, Taylor (7)	25	10
Total (15)	All (72)	382	87

=== Former ===
System	Counties	Dissolution	Aftermath
Arrowhead Library System	Rock (1)	2023	Merged into Prairie Lakes
Eastern Shores Library System	Ozaukee, Sheboygan (2)	2017	Merged into Monarch
Lakeshores Library System	Racine, Walworth (2)	2023	Merged into Prairie Lakes
Mid-Wisconsin Federated Library System	Dodge, Jefferson, Washington (3)	2017	Merged into Bridges and Monarch
Waukesha County Federated Library System	Waukesha (1)	2016	Merged into Bridges
