= Milwaukee County Federated Library System =

Public library in Milwaukee, Wisconsin, U.S.

Coordinates: 43.0391°N 87.922°W

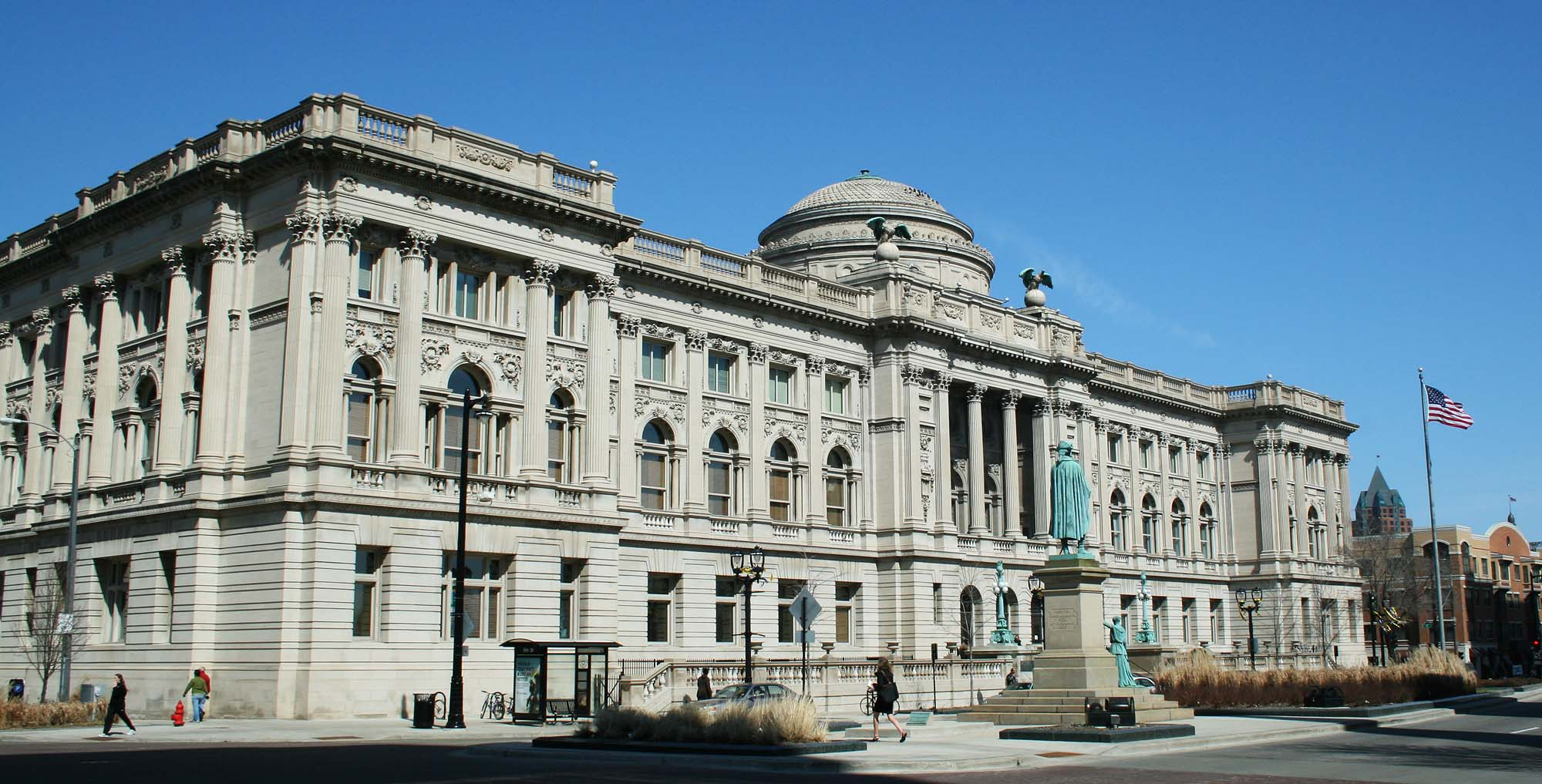
- MCFLS offices, located in the Milwaukee Central Library
- Location: Milwaukee, Wisconsin, U.S.
- Type: Public library

Other information
- Website: http://www.mcfls.org/

The Milwaukee County Federated Library System (MCFLS) is a public library system that coordinates activities between its member public libraries, which collectively serve the Milwaukee metropolitan area. It is governed by a board of trustees and funded by the State of Wisconsin and each member library. The system was established on January 1, 1973, one of the first to be set up under a Wisconsin state law that provided funding for county library systems.

== Purpose ==
The MCFLS provides a number of useful services to any person who is a member of one of its libraries. These services allow the person to use any member library as if they belonged to it, such as searching all libraries' collection through a common catalog system, checking out any library's materials through the internet, and requesting them to be delivered to a closer library. The MCFLS also provides administration services to each of its member libraries, such as assisting with technical upgrades, submitting annual reports, purchasing subscription database services, and providing continuing education opportunities.

== Member Libraries ==
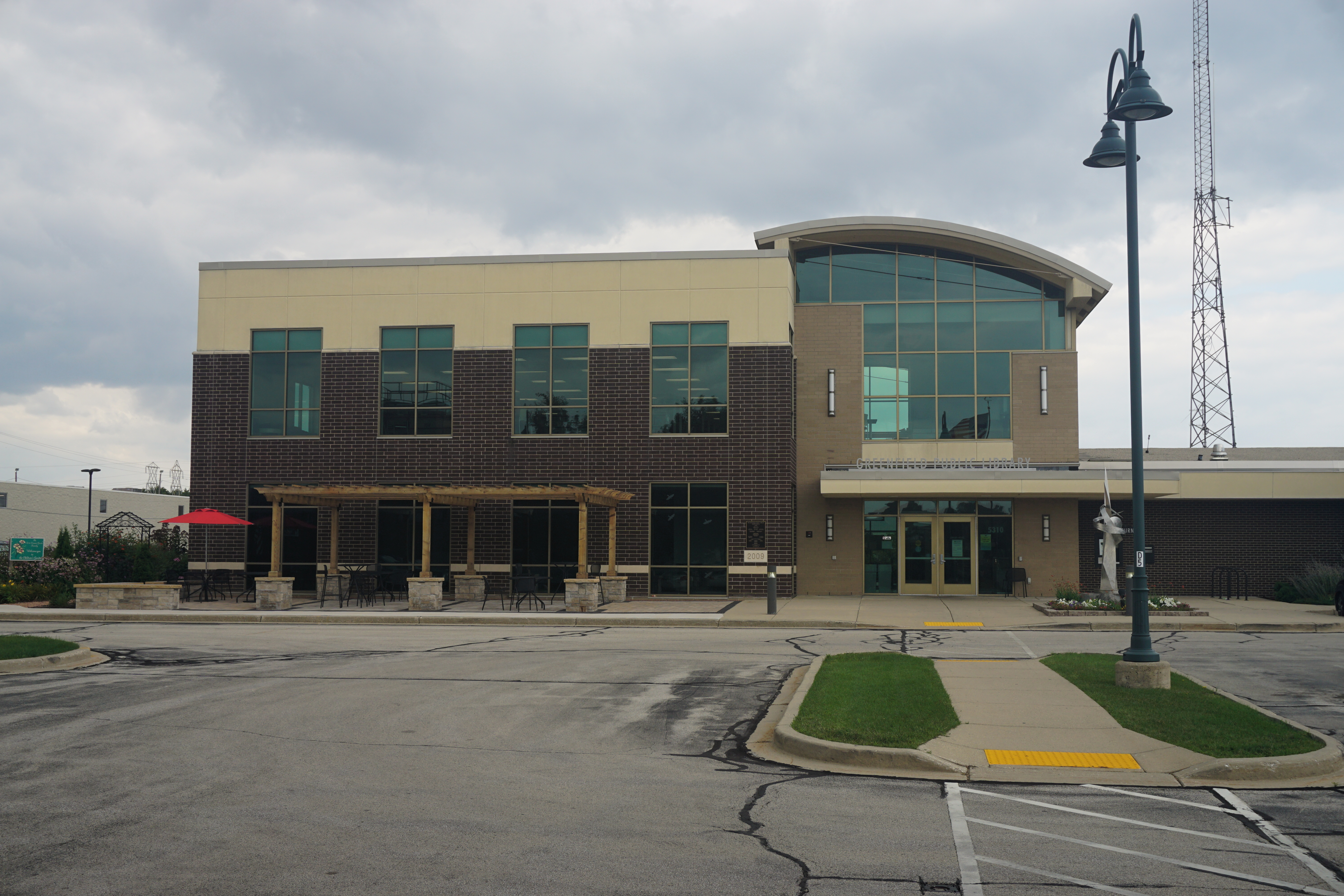
Greenfield Public Library in Greenfield, Wisconsin

Membership in the MCFLS consists of the following public libraries in Milwaukee County:

- Milwaukee Public Library, which maintains the following branch libraries throughout the city of Milwaukee in addition to its Central Library location:
  - Atkinson
  - Bay View
  - Capitol
  - Center Street
  - East
  - Good Hope
  - Martin Luther King
  - Mitchell Street
  - Tippecanoe
  - Villard Square
  - Washington Park
  - Zablocki
- Brown Deer Public Library
- Cudahy Family Library
- Franklin Public Library
- Greendale Public Library
- Greenfield Public Library
- Hales Corners Public Library
- North Shore Library (serving Bayside, Fox Point, Glendale, and River Hills)
- Oak Creek Public Library
- St. Francis Public Library
- Shorewood Public Library
- South Milwaukee Public Library
- Wauwatosa Public Library
- West Allis Public Library
- Whitefish Bay Public Library
