= Village on Park Street =

Community plaza in Madison, Wisconsin

Coordinates: 43°2′28″N 89°23′44″W

- Address: 2300 South Park Street, Madison, Wisconsin 53713
- Opened: August 1966
- Previous names: Park Plaza, Villager Shopping Center or Villager Mall
- Owner: City of Madison
- Floors: 2
- Public transit: Metro Transit
- Website: https://thevillageonpark.info

Village on Park Street (formerly Villager Mall) is a multi-building community plaza located in Madison, Wisconsin. Originally built in the 1960s, the plaza has evolved from a shopping center to a community plaza.

== History ==
The shopping center opened in the 1960s as Park Plaza. The building later connected to an existing bowling alley. It was later renamed Villager Shopping Center or Villager Mall. Businesses included Rennebohm Drugs, Ben Franklin, and Gorman's clothing.

In 1987 the shopping center was renovated. These renovations included converting the center of the mall to an enclosed mall space.

The shopping center was dying in the 1990s. In 1992, the bowling alley closed after 32 years.

In 1995, the former bowling alley was renovated into South Madison Health and Family Center - Harambee. This was a community center that housed a daycare, Planned Parenthood, a health clinic for low-income families, and a branch of the Madison Public Library.

Beginning in 2008, the mall underwent extensive renovation. The focus shifted from primarily retail to human services with a smaller retail component. The interior mall atrium area was renovated into offices. A chunk on the south end was demolished to make way for a new parking lot, forcing a move by Yue Wah Oriental Foods, a store at the far end of the mall.

In 2010, the center was renamed The Village on Park Street.
