= Philo Dunning =

American politician

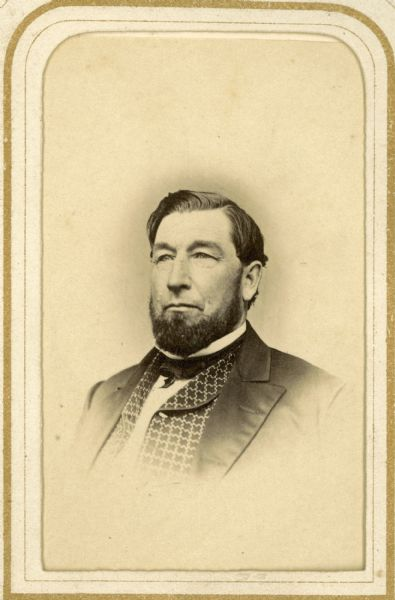
Philo Dunning, Wisconsin businessman and politician; from the collection of the Wisconsin Historical Society

Philo Dunning (March 23, 1819 – September 10, 1900) was an American merchant and druggist from Madison, Wisconsin, who held a number of local office, spent a single one-year term as a Reform Party member of the Wisconsin State Assembly from Dane County, and served on the state fisheries commission.

== Background ==
Dunning was born in Webster, New York, on March 23, 1819. He had a common school education, and became a merchant and druggist by trade. He arrived in Wisconsin Territory in 1840, and settled in Dane County, first in Blooming Grove, where he farmed, and later moved into downtown Madison, reportedly because "the railroad built its tracks across their front yard." His original home in Blooming Grove is still standing.

He was a delegate from Dane County to the May 1841 territorial Democratic Party meeting. In 1851 he was a member of both the Wisconsin Agricultural Society and the Dane County Agricultural Society. For some years prior to 1877, he operated a sawmill on Clyde Creek in the nearby Town of Burke, which he either bought or built in 1841 (accounts differ).

As of 1858, he was a trustee of Madison's downtown Congregational Church.

With his long-time partner Edwin Sumner, "Dunning and Sumner" on Pinckney Street in downtown Madison were retail and wholesale druggists, grocers, and sellers of products including "paints, oils, brushes, toilet articles, spectacles, etc." from 1868 or earlier until at least as late as 1892.

== Public office ==
In 1852, Dunning was elected to the board of supervisors (city council) of the Town of Madison and served as its chairman and thus ex officio as a member of Dane County's County Board. He was elected County Treasurer of Dane county in 1854. When in 1856 the City of Madison was chartered as a separate entity, he was elected to its first Board of Supervisors.

In 1873 he was appointed to the state's visiting committee on charitable and penal institutions by Gov. Cadwallader C. Washburn. In that same year he was elected to the Assembly's 2nd Dane County district (the Towns of Blooming Grove, Burke, Dunn and Windsor, and the City of Madison) as the candidate of the Reform Party (a short-lived coalition of Democrats, reform and Liberal Republicans, and Grangers which elected one governor and a number of state legislators) with 1,388 votes, against 995 for former state senator Clement Warner, a Republican (the incumbent, Levi Baker Vilas, was not a candidate for re-election). He was assigned to the joint committee on charitable and penal institutions. He was not a candidate for re-election in 1874, and was succeeded by Democrat Silas U. Pinney.

He served again on the Dane County Board of Supervisors for the 1878–1879 term from the 2nd Ward of Madison. From 1879 to 1893 he was a member of the Wisconsin Fish Commission; from 1887 to 1893 he served as president of that body. In the spring of 1889 he was elected to the executive committee of the American Fisheries Society.

In May 1893 it was announced that he had retired from business "to take life easy". He died on September 10, 1900, after suffering from paralysis for a year, and he is buried in Madison's Forest Hill Cemetery.
