= Dwight T. Parker Public Library =

- U.S. National Register of Historic Places
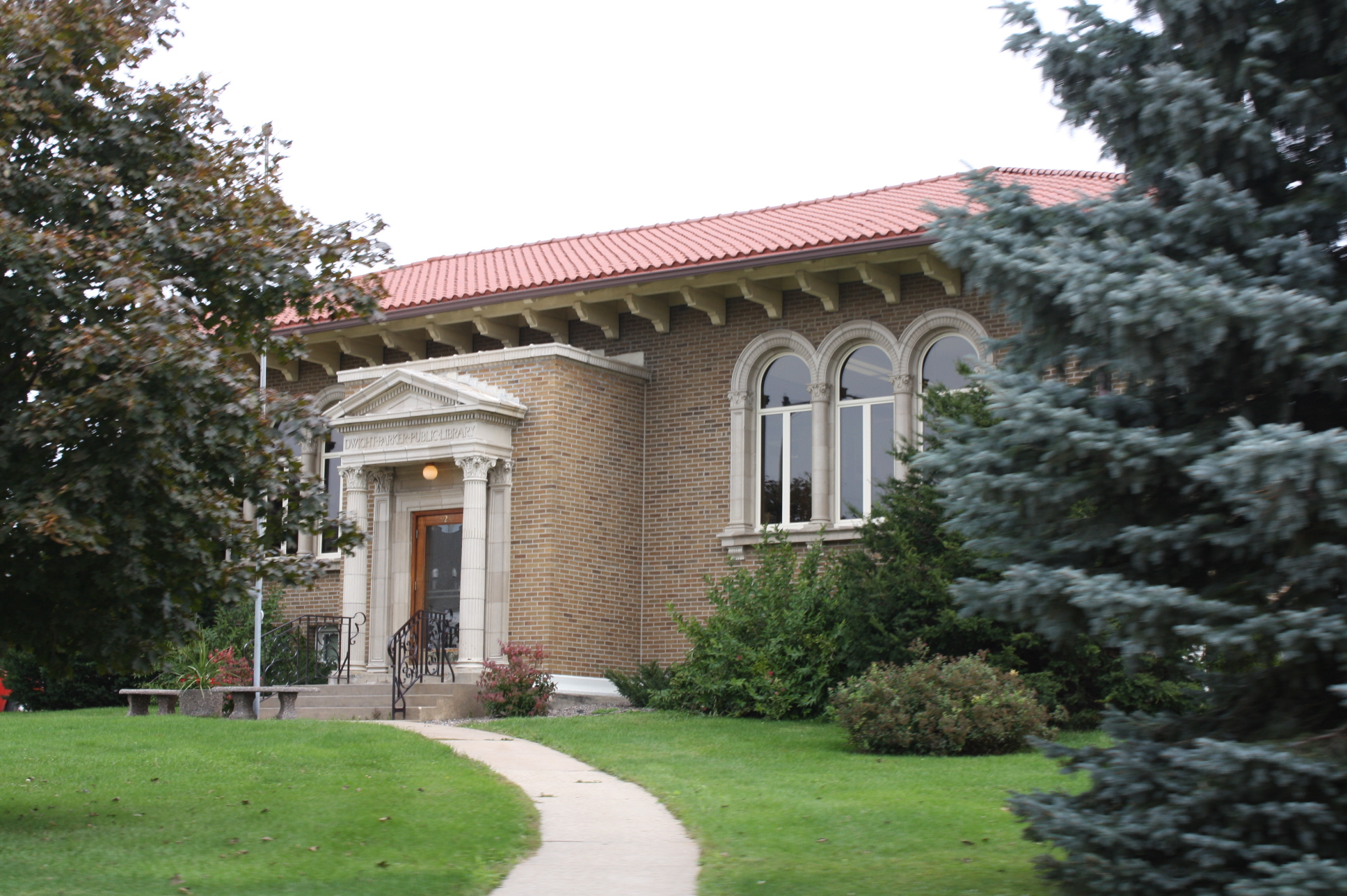

- Location within Wisconsin Location within the United States
- Location: 925 Lincoln Ave., Fennimore, Wisconsin
- Coordinates: 42°59′0″N 90°39′18″W
- Area: less than one acre
- Built: 1923
- Architect: Claude & Starck
- Architectural style: Mediterranean Revival, Neoclassical
- NRHP reference No.: 83003398
- Added to NRHP: March 10, 1983

Dwight T. Parker Public Library is a public library in Fennimore, Wisconsin. The building was constructed in 1923 to house the city's library, which had previously been based in a Methodist church and the Old Fennimore House. Dwight T. Parker, a local banker, funded the library. The architectural firm Claude & Starck designed the structure in a mixture of the Mediterranean Revival and neoclassical styles; the brick building features terra cotta ornamentation and a tile roof.

The library was added to the National Register of Historic Places on March 10, 1983.
