= Winding Rivers Library System =

Coordinates: 43.900095°N 91.099152°W

Winding Rivers Library System (WRLS) is a federated library system which provides services to 34 public libraries across seven Wisconsin counties (Buffalo, Jackson, Juneau, La Crosse, Monroe, Trempealeau, and Vernon). The La Crosse Public Library is the resource library for WRLS, and the administrative offices are in West Salem, Wisconsin.

== History ==
In January 1965, the La Crosse Public Library began selling professional services to smaller libraries in the surrounding counties, as part of a plan to build a new central library building with federal grant money. This arrangement was formalized as the La Crosse Area Library Development in November 1965, with the LCPL ordering and cataloging books for 17 libraries across Jackson, Juneau, La Crosse, Monroe, Trempealeau, and Vernon counties, as well as providing training for their librarians. A bookmobile serving the entire area was introduced in 1968.

In 1971, Wisconsin began offering state funding for public library systems which would administer library services across a region of one or more counties. The La Crosse Area Library System was one of the first to qualify under this program, representing all public libraries in Juneau, La Crosse, and Monroe counties. The other three counties initially chose not to participate because of the requirement that system services not covered by the state grant would be locally funded. The system began operations on January 1, 1973. Trempealeau County joined the system on January 1, 1974.

Vernon County was added at the beginning of 1978. Later that year, the name of the La Crosse Area Library System was changed to Winding Rivers Library System, reflecting the addition of Vernon County (which was not considered part of the La Crosse area) and allowing for the addition of more counties in the future. On January 1, 1979, Buffalo and Jackson counties joined the system, bringing it to its current membership of seven counties.

== Member libraries ==
- Buffalo County
  - Alma Public Library, Alma
  - Mondovi Public Library, Mondovi
- Jackson County
  - Black River Falls Public Library, Black River Falls
  - Taylor Memorial Library, Taylor
- Juneau County
  - Elroy Public Library, Elroy
  - Hatch Public Library, Mauston
  - Necedah Community-Siegler Memorial Library, Necedah
  - New Lisbon Memorial Library, New Lisbon
  - Wonewoc Public Library, Wonewoc
- La Crosse County
  - La Crosse County Library, Holmen
    - F.J. Robers Library (branch), Campbell
    - Hazel Brown Leicht Memorial Library (branch), West Salem
    - Holmen Public Library (branch), Holmen
    - John Bosshard Memorial Library (branch), Bangor
    - Onalaska Public Library (branch), Onalaska
  - La Crosse Public Library, La Crosse
    - North Community Branch, La Crosse
- Monroe County
  - Cashton Memorial Library, Cashton
  - Kendall Public Library, Kendall
  - Norwalk Public Library, Norwalk
  - Sparta Free Library, Sparta
  - Tomah Public Library, Tomah
  - Wilton Public Library, Wilton
- Trempealeau County
  - Arcadia Free Public Library, Arcadia
  - Blair-Preston Public Library, Blair
  - Ettrick Public Library, Ettrick
  - Galesville Public Library, Galesville
  - Hauge Memorial Library, Osseo
  - Independence Public Library, Independence
  - Shirley M. Wright Memorial Library, Trempealeau
  - Strum Public Library, Strum
  - Whitehall Community Library, Whitehall
- Vernon County
  - Bekkum Memorial Public Library, Westby
  - De Soto Public Library, De Soto
  - Hillsboro Public Library, Hillsboro
  - Knutson Memorial Library, Coon Valley
  - Lawton Memorial Library, La Farge
  - McIntosh Memorial Library, Viroqua
  - Ontario Public Library, Ontario
  - Readstown Public Library, Readstown
