= Fennimore, Wisconsin =

City in Grant County, Wisconsin

- City
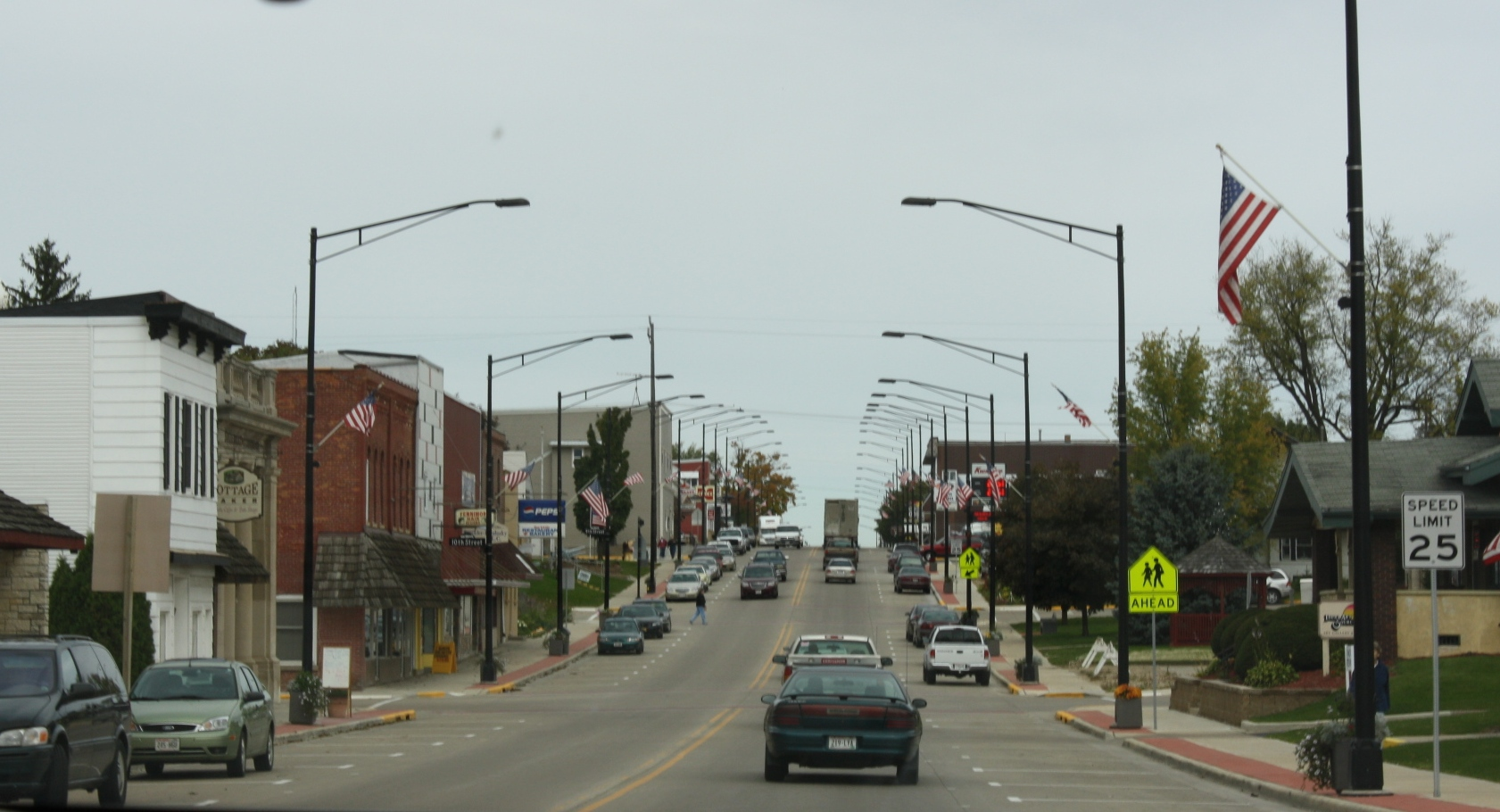
- Downtown Fennimore on US 18/US 61

- Location of Fennimore in Grant County, Wisconsin.

- Location within Wisconsin Location within the United States
- Coordinates: 42°58′56″N 90°39′11″W
- Country: United States
- State: Wisconsin
- County: Grant

Area
  - Total: 1.73 sq mi (4.47 km^{2})
  - Land: 1.73 sq mi (4.47 km^{2})
  - Water: 0 sq mi (0.00 km^{2})
- Elevation: 1,194 ft (364 m)

Population (2020)
  - Total: 2,764
  - Density: 1,600/sq mi (618/km^{2})
- Time zone: UTC-6 (Central (CST))
  - Summer (DST): UTC-5 (CDT)
- Area code: 608
- FIPS code: 55-25600
- GNIS feature ID: 1564906
- Website: www.fennimore.com

Fennimore is a city in Grant County, Wisconsin, United States. The population was 2,764 at the 2020 census. The city's area was separated from the Town of Fennimore, which remains as an adjacent rural area.

== History ==
Fennimore was named for a settler who disappeared during the Black Hawk War. It was previously also known as Fennimore Center. Fennimore incorporated as a village in 1889 and changed to a city in 1919.

== Geography ==
According to the United States Census Bureau, the city has a total area of 1.62 square miles (4.20 km^{2}), all land.

== Demographics ==
Historical population
Census	Pop.	Note	%±
1880	295		—
1890	616		108.8%
1900	1,035		68.0%
1910	1,159		12.0%
1920	1,383		19.3%
1930	1,341		−3.0%
1940	1,592		18.7%
1950	1,696		6.5%
1960	1,747		3.0%
1970	1,861		6.5%
1980	2,212		18.9%
1990	2,378		7.5%
2000	2,387		0.4%
2010	2,497		4.6%
2020	2,764		10.7%
U.S. Decennial Census

=== 2020 census ===
As of the census of 2020, there were 2,764 people, and 1,174 households in the city. The population density was 1,600 inhabitants per square mile (617.8/km^{2}). The racial makeup of the city was 93.2% White, 0.4 African American, 0.2% 0.4% Native American, 0.7% Asian, 1.2% from other races, 4.2% from two or more races. Hispanic or Latino of any race were 3.3% of the population.

=== 2010 census ===
As of the census of 2010, there were 2,497 people, 1,053 households, and 647 families living in the city. The population density was 1,541.4 inhabitants per square mile (595.1/km^{2}). There were 1,145 housing units at an average density of 706.8 per square mile (272.9/km^{2}). The racial makeup of the city was 98.2% White, 0.1% African American, 0.4% Native American, 0.5% Asian, 0.3% from other races, and 0.4% from two or more races. Hispanic or Latino of any race were 1.2% of the population.

There were 1,053 households, of which 31.0% had children under the age of 18 living with them, 45.4% were married couples living together, 11.0% had a female householder with no husband present, 5.0% had a male householder with no wife present, and 38.6% were non-families. 32.0% of all households were made up of individuals, and 13.9% had someone living alone who was 65 years of age or older. The average household size was 2.31 and the average family size was 2.89.

The median age in the city was 36.7 years. 25% of residents were under the age of 18; 9.8% were between the ages of 18 and 24; 24.2% were from 25 to 44; 23.4% were from 45 to 64; and 17.7% were 65 years of age or older. The gender makeup of the city was 48.8% male and 51.2% female.

=== 2000 census ===
As of the census of 2000, there were 2,387 people, 1,021 households, and 622 families living in the city. The population density was 1,610.5 people per square mile (622.7/km^{2}). There were 1,068 housing units at an average density of 278.6 persons/km^{2} (720.6 persons/sq mi). The racial makeup of the city was 99.12% White, 0.08% African American, 0.08% Native American, 0.21% Asian, 0.00% Pacific Islander, 0.34% from other races, and 0.17% from two or more races. 0.75% of the population were Hispanic or Latino of any race.

There were 1,021 households, out of which 28.0% had children under the age of 18 living with them, 48.8% were married couples living together, 9.7% have a woman whose husband does not live with her, and 39.0% were non-families. 32.0% of all households were made up of individuals, and 16.8% had someone living alone who was 65 years of age or older. The average household size was 2.27 and the average family size was 2.88.

In the city, the population was spread out, with 23.2% under the age of 18, 9.4% from 18 to 24, 25.8% from 25 to 44, 20.1% from 45 to 64, and 21.6% who were 65 years of age or older. The median age was 40 years. For every 100 females, there were 91.1 males. For every 100 females age 18 and over, there were 83.2 males.

The median income for a household in the city was $34,453, and the median income for a family was $42,287. Males had a median income of $33,095 versus $20,274 for females. The per capita income for the city was $18,701. 7.9% of the population and 4.1% of families were below the poverty line. Out of the total people living in poverty, 8.4% are under the age of 18 and 7.8% are 65 or older.

== Notable people ==
- Joshua B. Bradbury, Wisconsin legislator
- David A. Brandemuehl, Wisconsin legislator
- Richard Kreul, Wisconsin legislator
- William A. Loy, Wisconsin legislator
- Edward J. Roethe, Wisconsin legislator
- Henry Edgar Roethe, Wisconsin legislator

== Education ==
- The main campus and offices of the Southwest Wisconsin Technical College are in Fennimore.

== Gallery ==
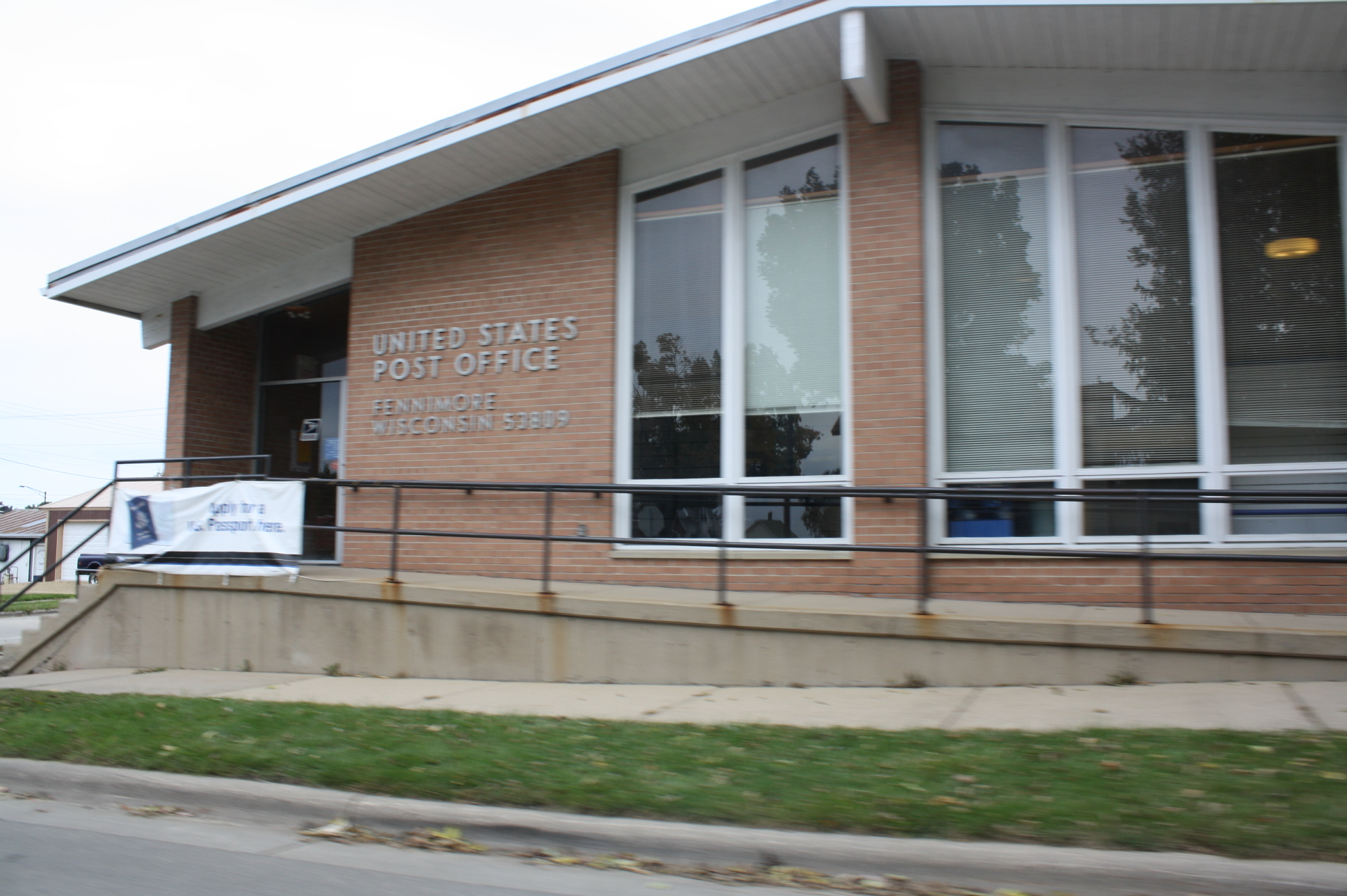
Post office

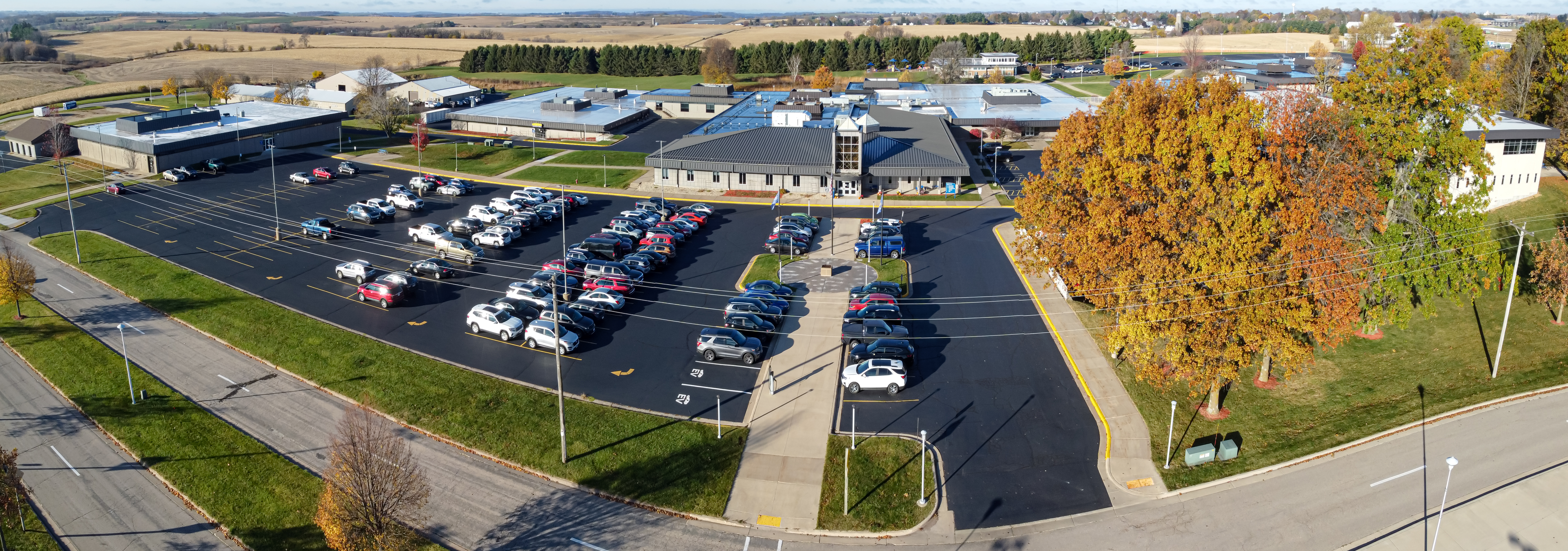
Southwest Wisconsin Technical College in Fennimore

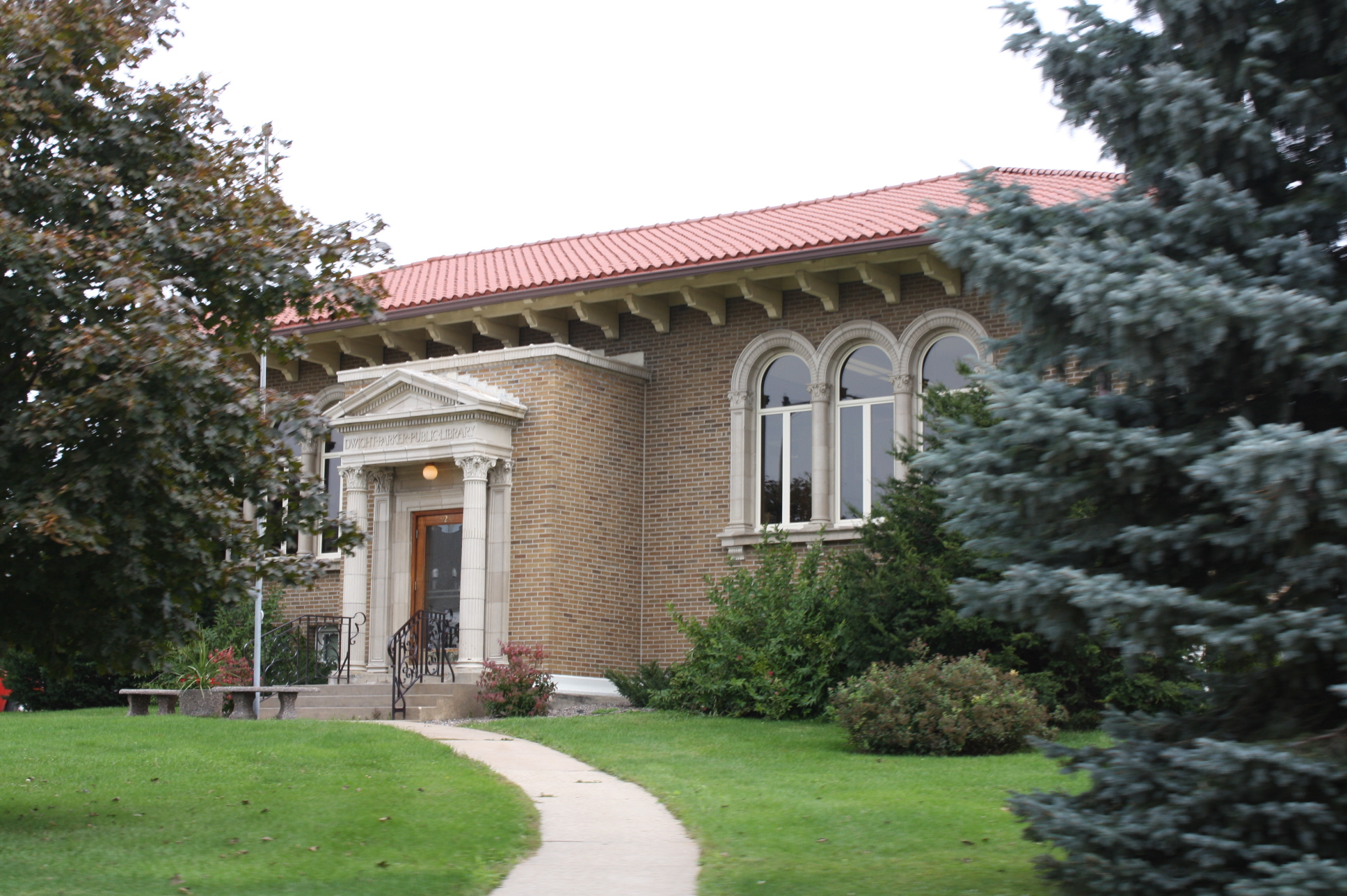
Dwight T. Parker Public Library

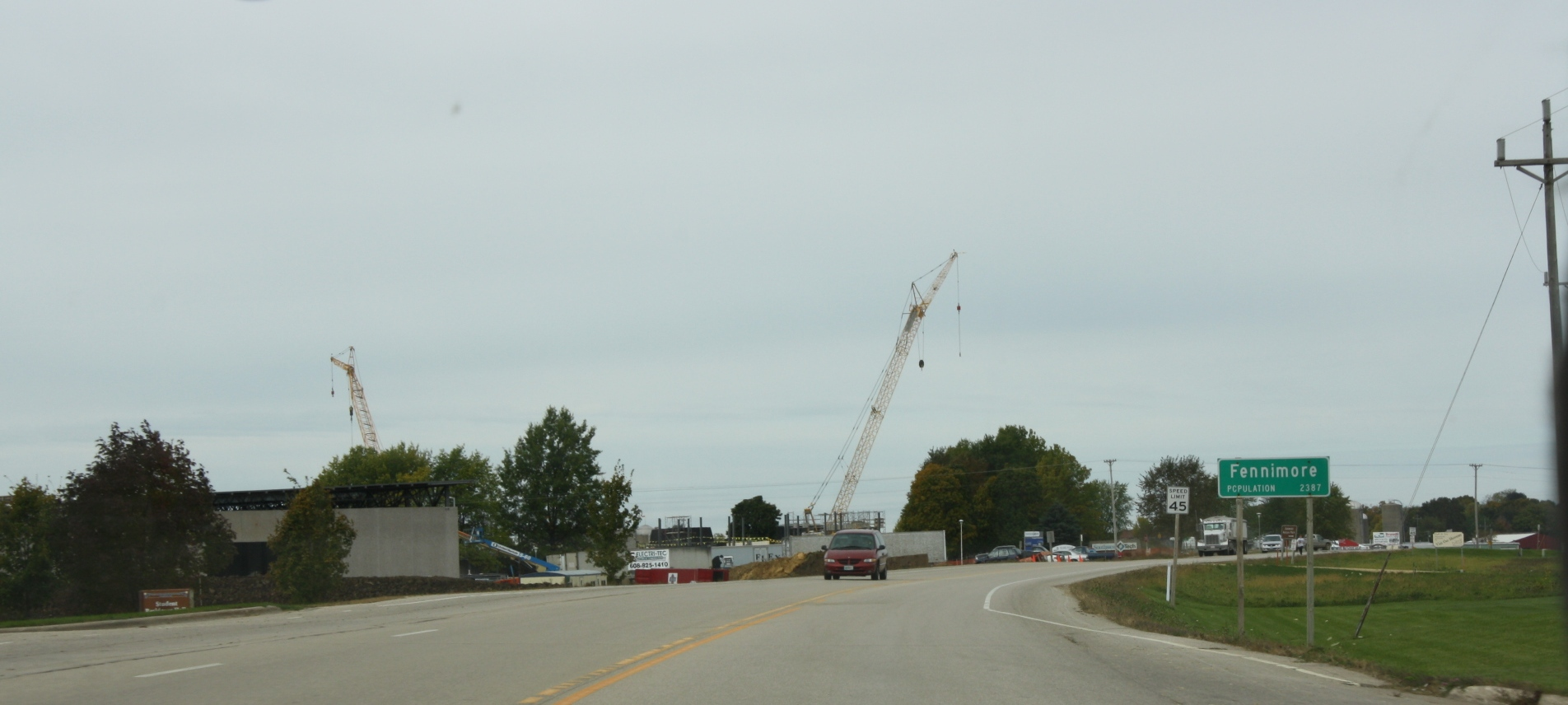
Sign on US 18, SWTC construction in background

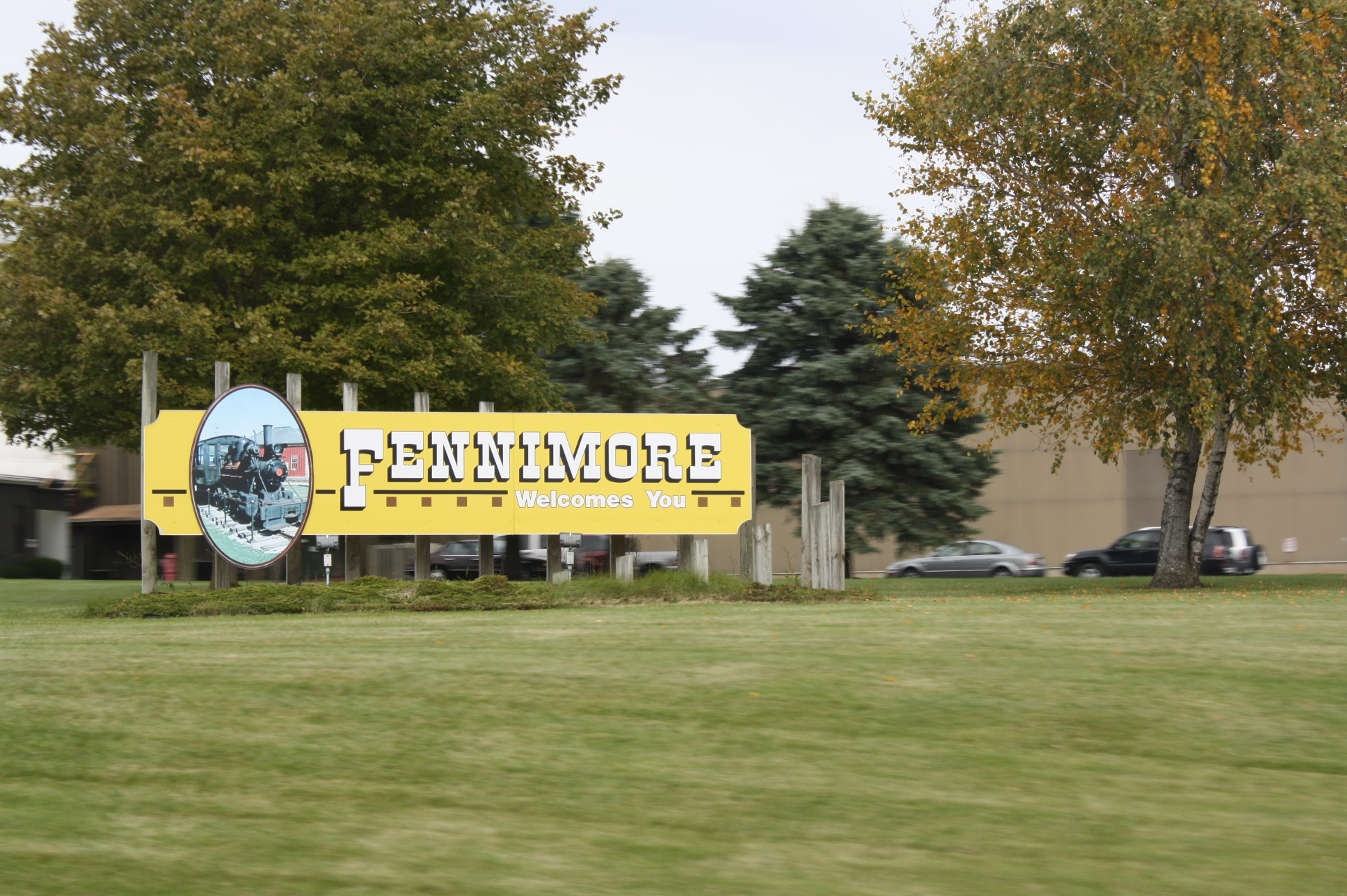
Welcome sign

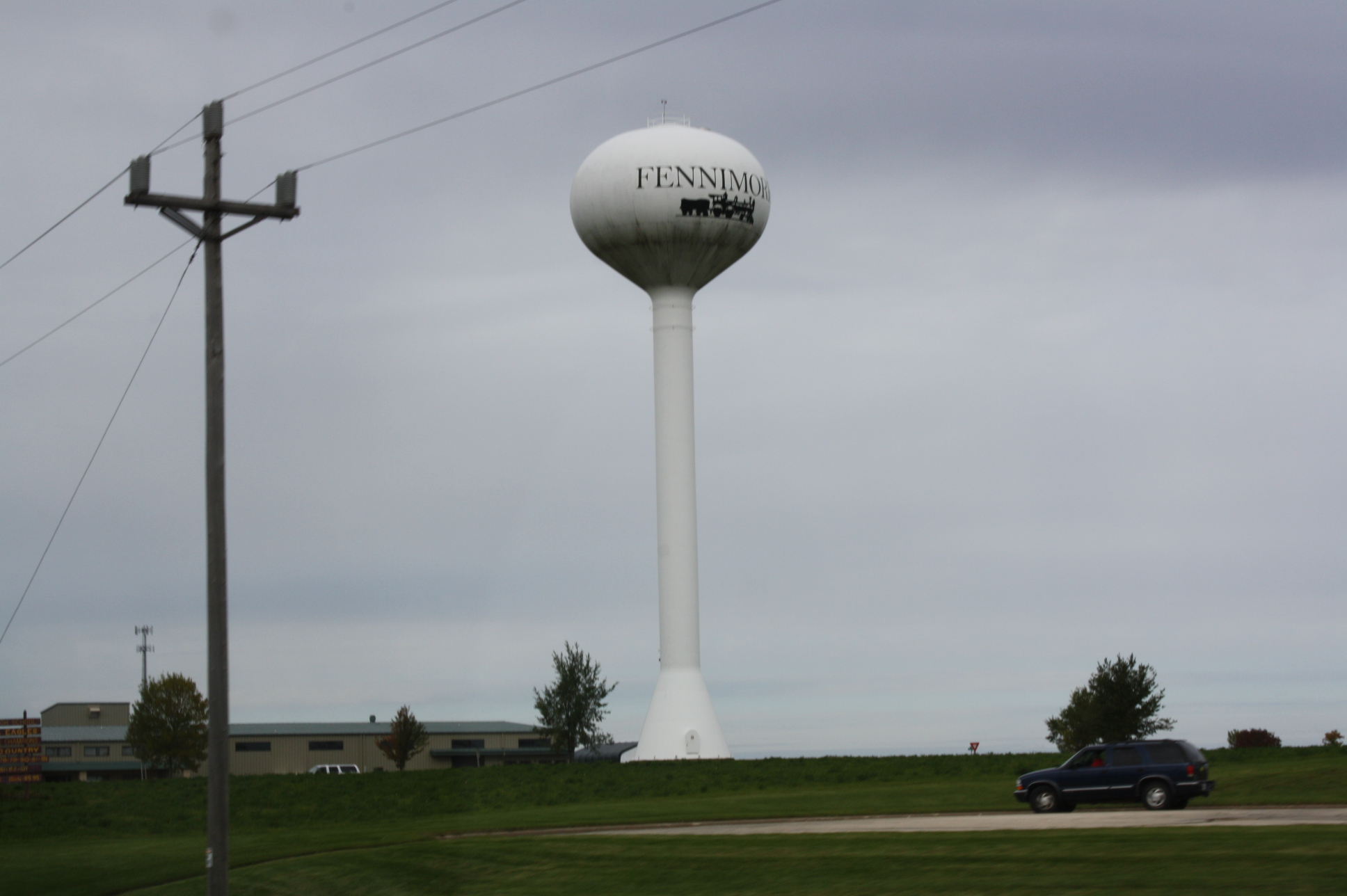
Water tower

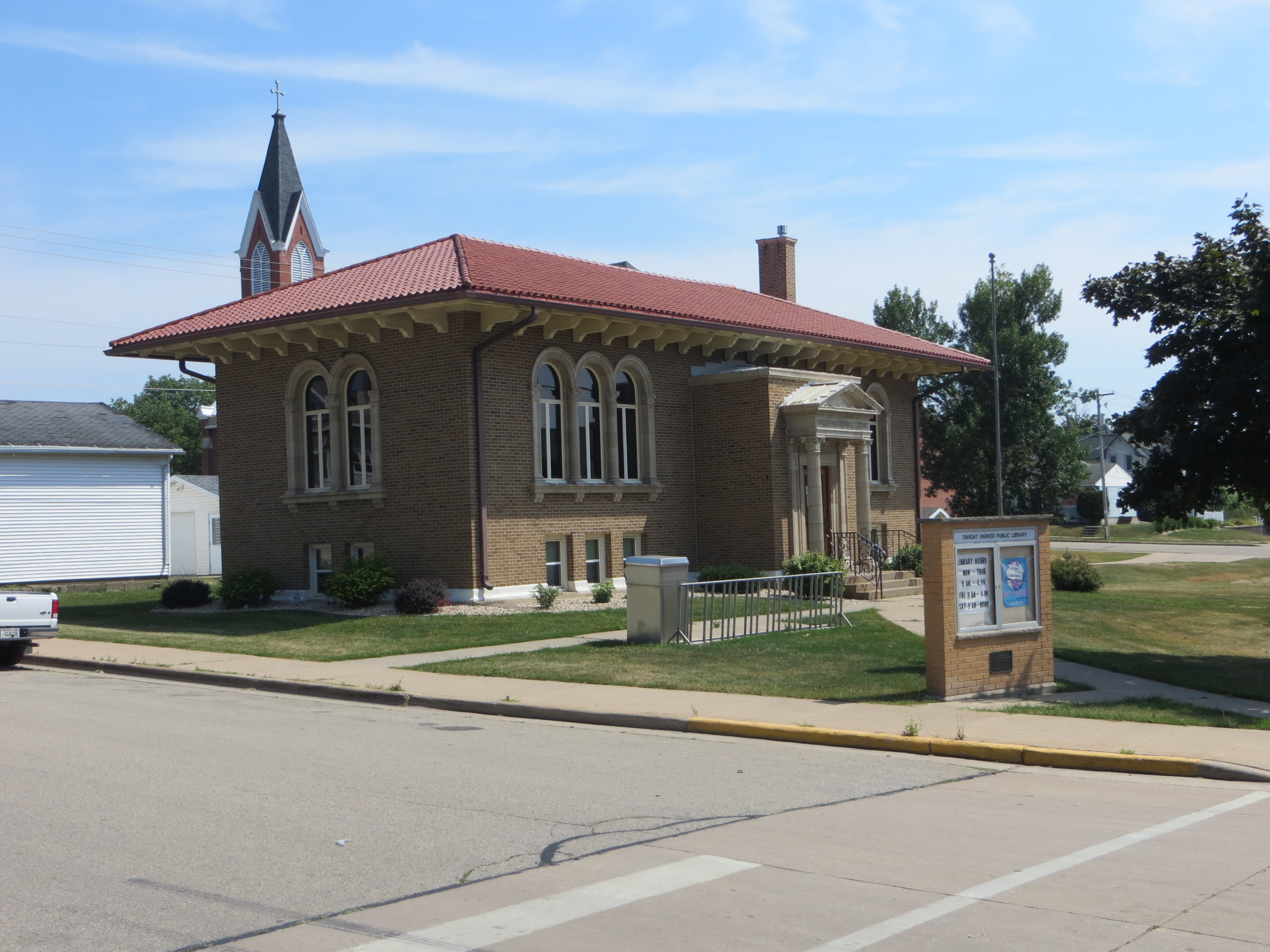
Library in Fennimore

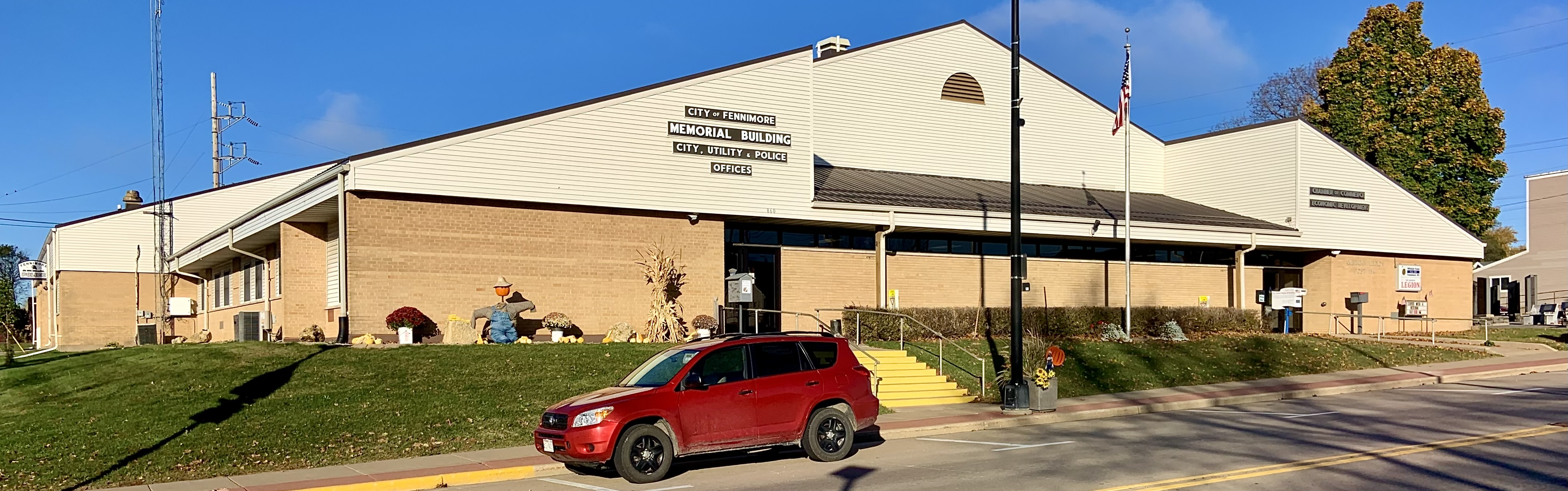
City hall
