= Jared Comstock Gregory =

American politician

Jared Comstock Gregory (January 13, 1823, in Butternuts, New York – February 17, 1892) was mayor of Madison, Wisconsin. He became a lawyer and married Charlotte C. Camp in 1848. They had three children. He moved to Madison in 1858. He was Episcopalian.

== Political career ==
While still living in New York, Gregory was elected a justice of the peace. In 1856, he was candidate for the United States House of Representatives from New York's 19th congressional district, losing to Oliver A. Morse. After moving to Wisconsin, he served as mayor of Madison from 1873 to 1874. In 1870, he was again a candidate for the United States House of Representatives, this time from Wisconsin's 2nd congressional district, in a special election following the death of Benjamin F. Hopkins. He would lose to David Atwood. Gregory ran again from the same district in 1880, losing to incumbent Lucien B. Caswell. He was a Democrat.
