= Frank Gault =

American politician (1826–1898)

Frank Gault (January 31, 1826 – February 7, 1898) was a Democratic member of the Wisconsin State Assembly. Gault was born in Belfast, Ireland in 1826. In 1848, he settled in Middleton, Wisconsin, where he farmed. Gault married Mary Eyre Gyles in Milwaukee, Wisconsin in 1850. They had two children. After his political career in Wisconsin, he moved to Kentucky. He farmed in South Dakota for several years and then returned to Kentucky, where he died in 1898.

== Political career ==
Gault was a member of the Assembly during the 1858, 1867 and 1868 sessions. He served as treasurer of Dane County, Wisconsin from 1859 to 1860. In 1863, Gault was an unsuccessful candidate for the Wisconsin State Senate.
