= La Crosse Public Library (La Crosse, Wisconsin) =

Public library in La Crosse, Wisconsin

Coordinates: 43.8114°N 91.245°W

La Crosse Public Library

La Crosse Public Library (La Crosse, Wisconsin) is the public library system in La Crosse, Wisconsin.

The library serves as the resource library for the Winding Rivers Library System. The library serves 50,000 people, has 245,000 volumes, and has 800,000 annual circulation transactions.

In 2005, the La Crosse Public Library won an award for its digitized history website.

== History ==
After the death of former Wisconsin Governor Cadwallader C. Washburn, a large bequest was made, land was purchased, and a library was built which was opened in 1888. A children's department was opened in 1905 and in 1909 a large extension to the building was built which nearly doubled its size. After 55 years of continuous growth the library was short of space and in 1964 the Friends of the LaCrosse Public Library was formed to address the problem. By 1966 the old building had been razed and replaced by a new one which gained two architectural awards and opened in 1967. After a bequest from Susan and Elizabeth Swarthout it was possible to extend this building and provide accommodation for the La Crosse County Historical Society. The extension was opened in 1980 and in 1981 the library became a department of the city of La Crosse. the use of computers began in 1985 and in 1988 the library celebrated its centennial and the checking out of the 25 millionth book. Remodeling work was undertaken in 1996 and again in 2007 to improve the circulation workflow and service for juvenile readers.
