= Madison Public Library (Madison, Wisconsin) =

Public library in Madison, Wisconsin, U.S.

Coordinates: 43.0735°N 89.3873°W

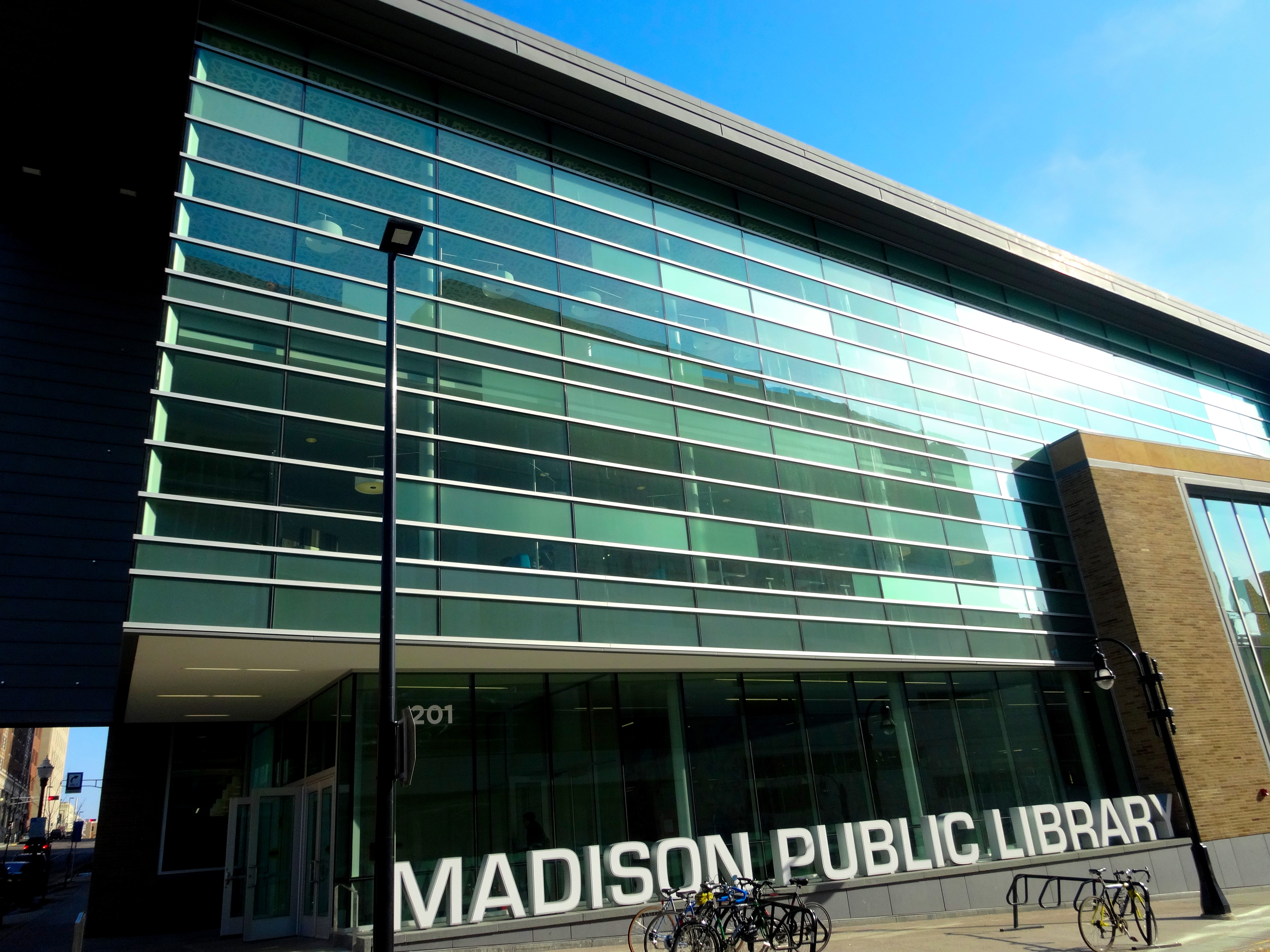
- Location: 201 W. Mifflin St., Madison, Wisconsin, U.S.
- Established: 1875
- Branches: 9

Collection
- Size: 787,793 (2013)

Access and use
- Population served: 259,679 (2013)

Other information
- Director: Tana Elias
- Website: http://www.madisonpubliclibrary.org/

Madison Public Library (MPL), originally called the Madison Free Library, is the public library system in Madison, Wisconsin, United States, consisting of a central library and 8 neighborhood libraries. Madison Public Library is part of the South Central Library System, the second-largest public library system in Wisconsin after Milwaukee Public Library.

== History ==
Madison Public Library was created by city ordinance in November 1874 under the persuasion of Mayor Silas Pinney. It opened on May 31, 1875 as the "Madison Free Library" in two rooms of City Hall. It would keep that name until it was renamed the Madison Public Library effective on January 1, 1959. The original collection was a gift of 3,170 volumes from the Madison Institute, whose library had occupied the same space before the Madison Free Library was created. The collection increased by 200 after city residents were invited to donate books to the library on its opening day. The first librarian, Virginia Robbins, was paid $400 per year to "function primarily as a clerk to dispense requested books" and to supervise the Library, while the Library Board of Directors controlled all book selection and arrangement. She used beans to keep track of the number of books that were borrowed and what genre they were.

There was a collection box with sections labeled history, literature, religion, travel, fiction, and science. When patrons checked out a book, they dropped a bean in the proper compartment of the box. Sometimes when patrons neglected to drop their beans, Miss Robbins put two or three extra beans in the boxes to keep the count as closely accurate as possible.

The Library stayed in the City Hall until 1906, when it moved into a new Carnegie library building that included a library school on the second floor until 1938 when the school became part of the University of Wisconsin–Madison and moved to the University. In 1965, the Central Library moved to its current location at 201 West Mifflin Street. In 1913, the Library opened its first branch in the Sixth Ward on Williamson Street (which would eventually become the Hawthorne Neighborhood Library after several moves and name changes) and opened its second in late 1916/early 1917 in the Neighborhood House on East Washington Avenue. In addition to traditional branches, the Library also operated book deposit stations in Madison storefronts, factories, and fire stations starting in 1903; and, starting in 1911, the Library operated libraries in Madison public schools until they were moved under the jurisdiction of the Madison Board of Education in 1952.

== Library locations ==
- Alicia Ashman
- Central Library (Downtown)
- Goodman South Madison (Village on Park Street)
- Hawthorne
- Lakeview
- Meadowridge (Southwest side)
- Monroe Street
- Pinney
- Sequoya
