= Matthew Roche (bishop) =

Matthew Roche was an Irish Roman Catholic bishop in the seventeenth century: he was appointed vicar Bishop of Leighlin by papal brief on 15 January 1622.
