= Matthew Roche (politician) =

American politician (1827–1873)

Matthew Roche (c. 1827 – March 11, 1873) was a Democratic member of the Wisconsin State Assembly during the 1853 session.

Roche was born in Ireland, emigrated to the United States in 1849, and was naturalized in 1850. He married Elizabeth Walsh (1834–1901) in 1853. He represented the 5th District of Dane County, Wisconsin. He later served as postmaster of Westport, Wisconsin. He died in 1873.
