= John D. Gurnee =

American politician

John Denton Gurnee (December 25, 1831 – March 15, 1906) was an American politician and lawyer.

Born in the town of Ramapo, Rockland County, New York, Gurnee graduated from Princeton University in 1854. He studied law in the office of William C. Hasbrouck in Newburgh, New York and was admitted to the New York bar in 1857. Gurnee settled in Madison, Wisconsin, in 1857, and practiced law. Gurnee was involved with the Democratic Party. In 1872, Gurnee served in the Wisconsin State Assembly. In 1896, Gurnee ended his involvement with the Democratic Party. Wisconsin Governor Cadwallader C. Washburn appointed Gurnee to the Wisconsin Park Commission. Gurnee died at his home in Madison, Wisconsin.
