= List of secretaries of state of Wisconsin =

Number of secretaries of state of Wisconsin by party affiliation (Note: Wisconsin has had 29 secretaries of state. Two served non-consecutive terms, and are thus counted twice in this table. Theodore Dammann changed his party and is therefore counted twice also.)
Party	Secretaries
Republican	20
Democratic	11
Progressive	1

The secretary of state of Wisconsin is an officer of the executive branch of the government of the U.S. state of Wisconsin and the second in the order of succession of the governor of Wisconsin, behind the lieutenant governor. The secretary of state is responsible for keeping records of the official acts of the legislative and executive branches of Wisconsin's government and affixing the Great Seal of the State of Wisconsin to the official acts of the governor.

As second in the order of succession to Wisconsin's governorship, the secretary of state becomes governor if the governor dies, resigns or is removed from office while the lieutenant governorship is vacant; prior to a 1979 amendment to the Wisconsin Constitution, however, the secretary simply became acting governor if any of these events were to occur. No secretary of state has ever ascended to the governorship or acting-governorship under such circumstances. Both before and after the 1979 amendment, the secretary becomes acting governor while the governor is absent from the state, impeached or incapacitated in the absence of a lieutenant governor. Some secretaries of state have acted as governor for short periods of time under such circumstances.

Under the original terms of the state constitution, the secretary of state was elected for a two-year term on a separate ticket from the governor or any other official. A 1967 amendment increased the term of the secretary of state, as well as those of other state officials, to four years. There is no limit to the number of terms a secretary of state may hold. In the event of the death, resignation or removal from office of the secretary of state, the governor may appoint someone to fill the vacancy.

Twenty-eight individuals have held the office of secretary of state since Wisconsin's admission to the Union in 1848, two of whom—Fred Zimmerman and Douglas La Follette—served for non-consecutive terms. The first secretary of state was Thomas McHugh, who took office on June 7, 1848. The current secretary is Sarah Godlewski, who took office on March 17, 2023; her current term expires in 2027.

== Secretaries of state ==
=== Secretaries of Wisconsin Territory ===
From 1836 until 1848, what is now Wisconsin was part of Wisconsin Territory. The Organic Act which created the territory provided for the office of a secretary, to be appointed by the president, whose duties consisted of recording the proceedings of the territory's legislature, and the laws it produced, as well as the proceedings of the territorial governor. Additionally, in the event of the inability of the governor to serve—due to death or various other circumstances—the secretary was to assume the governor's powers and carry out his duties.

Wisconsin Territory was formed on July 3, 1836. During the time of its existence, it had six territorial secretaries.

#	Image	Name	Appointed	Left office (Note: When there is no evidence to the contrary, it is assumed that territorial secretaries left office the same day their successors were appointed.)	Territorial Governor	Appointed by
1		John S. Horner	April 30, 1836	February 16, 1837	Henry Dodge	Andrew Jackson
2		William B. Slaughter	February 16, 1837	January 25, 1841	Henry Dodge	Andrew Jackson
3		Francis J. Dunn	January 25, 1841	April 23, 1841	Henry Dodge	Martin Van Buren
4		Alexander Pope Field	April 23, 1841	October 30, 1843	Henry Dodge	John Tyler
4		Alexander Pope Field	April 23, 1841	October 30, 1843	James Doty	John Tyler
5		George R. C. Floyd	October 30, 1843	February 24, 1846	James Doty	John Tyler
5		George R. C. Floyd	October 30, 1843	February 24, 1846	Nathaniel Tallmadge	John Tyler
5		George R. C. Floyd	October 30, 1843	February 24, 1846	Henry Dodge	John Tyler
6		John Catlin	February 24, 1846	March 3, 1849 (Note: Wisconsin became a state on May 29, 1848; however, portions of the territory which are now part of Minnesota were not included in the state; some were of the opinion that this area continued to be Wisconsin Territory. Henry Dodge took his seat as a U.S. Senator from Wisconsin on June 23, 1848, thus precluding the possibility that he continued to be the Territorial Governor. John Catlin therefore declared that, as Secretary, he was the acting governor of Wisconsin Territory, an office he exercised until the organization of Minnesota Territory on March 3, 1849.)	Henry Dodge	James Polk

=== Secretaries of state of Wisconsin ===
Wisconsin was admitted to the Union on May 29, 1848. Since then, it has had 29 secretaries of state, two of whom served non-consecutive terms.

Democratic Whig Republican Progressive Changed party

#	Image	Name	Party	Took office	Left office (Note: When there is no evidence to the contrary, it is assumed that secretaries of state left office the same day their successors were sworn in.)	Governor	Terms (Note: The fractional terms of some secretaries of state are not to be understood absolutely literally; rather, they are meant to show single terms during which multiple secretaries served due to death.)
1		Thomas McHugh	Democratic	June 7, 1848	January 7, 1850	Nelson Dewey	1
2		William A. Barstow	Democratic	January 7, 1850	January 5, 1852	Nelson Dewey	1
3		Charles D. Robinson	Democratic	January 5, 1852	January 2, 1854	Leonard Farwell	1
4		Alexander T. Gray	Democratic	January 2, 1854	January 7, 1856	William A. Barstow	1
5		David W. Jones	Democratic	January 7, 1856	January 2, 1860	William A. Barstow	2
5		David W. Jones	Democratic	January 7, 1856	January 2, 1860	Arthur MacArthur Sr.	2
5		David W. Jones	Democratic	January 7, 1856	January 2, 1860	Coles Bashford	2
5		David W. Jones	Democratic	January 7, 1856	January 2, 1860	Alexander Randall	2
6		Louis P. Harvey (Note: Earlier editions of the Wisconsin Blue Books refer to the sixth secretary of state as "Louis P. Harvey" and make it clear that he and "Louis Powell Harvey", the seventh governor of the state, are the same man. More recent editions, however, refer to the seventh governor as "Louis Powell Harvey" and the sixth secretary of state as "Lewis P. Harvey".)	Republican	January 2, 1860	January 6, 1862	Alexander Randall	1
7		James T. Lewis	Republican	January 6, 1862	January 4, 1864	Louis P. Harvey	1
7		James T. Lewis	Republican	January 6, 1862	January 4, 1864	Edward Salomon	1
8		Lucius Fairchild	Republican	January 4, 1864	January 1, 1866	James T. Lewis	1
9		Thomas S. Allen	Republican	January 1, 1866	January 3, 1870	Lucius Fairchild	2
10		Llywelyn Breese	Republican	January 3, 1870	January 5, 1874	Lucius Fairchild	2
10		Llywelyn Breese	Republican	January 3, 1870	January 5, 1874	Cadwallader C. Washburn	2
11		Peter Doyle	Democratic	January 5, 1874	January 7, 1878	William Robert Taylor	2
11		Peter Doyle	Democratic	January 5, 1874	January 7, 1878	Harrison Ludington	2
12		Hans Warner	Republican	January 7, 1878	January 2, 1882	William E. Smith	2
13		Ernst Timme	Republican	January 2, 1882	January 5, 1891	Jeremiah M. Rusk	4 (Note: During Timme's first term, the Wisconsin Constitution was amended to say that all elections of state and county officers would henceforth take place in even-numbered years. By the provisions of the amendment, the terms of all officials who would have left office in 1884, including Timme, were extended by one year.)
13		Ernst Timme	Republican	January 2, 1882	January 5, 1891	William D. Hoard	4
14		Thomas Cunningham	Democratic	January 5, 1891	January 7, 1895	George Wilbur Peck	2
15		Henry Casson	Republican	January 7, 1895	January 2, 1899	William H. Upham	2
15		Henry Casson	Republican	January 7, 1895	January 2, 1899	Edward Scofield	2
16		William Froehlich	Republican	January 2, 1899	January 5, 1903	Edward Scofield	2
16		William Froehlich	Republican	January 2, 1899	January 5, 1903	Robert M. La Follette Sr.	2
17		Walter Houser	Republican	January 5, 1903	January 7, 1907	Robert M. La Follette Sr.	2
17		Walter Houser	Republican	January 5, 1903	January 7, 1907	James O. Davidson	2
18		James A. Frear	Republican	January 7, 1907	January 6, 1913	James O. Davidson	3
18		James A. Frear	Republican	January 7, 1907	January 6, 1913	Francis E. McGovern	3
19		John Donald	Republican	January 6, 1913	January 1, 1917	Francis E. McGovern	2
19		John Donald	Republican	January 6, 1913	January 1, 1917	Emanuel L. Philipp	2
20		Merlin Hull	Republican	January 1, 1917	January 3, 1921	Emanuel L. Philipp	2
21		Elmer Hall	Republican	January 3, 1921	January 1, 1923	John J. Blaine	1
22		Fred R. Zimmerman	Republican	January 1, 1923	January 3, 1927	John J. Blaine	2
23		Theodore Dammann	Republican	January 3, 1927	January 7, 1935	Fred R. Zimmerman	4
23		Theodore Dammann	Republican	January 3, 1927	January 7, 1935	Walter J. Kohler Sr.	4
23		Theodore Dammann	Republican	January 3, 1927	January 7, 1935	Philip La Follette	4
23		Theodore Dammann	Republican	January 3, 1927	January 7, 1935	Albert G. Schmedeman	4
23		Theodore Dammann	Progressive	January 7, 1935	January 2, 1939	Philip La Follette	2
24		Fred R. Zimmerman	Republican	January 2, 1939	December 14, 1954	Julius P. Heil	71/3 (Note: Died in office.)
24		Fred R. Zimmerman	Republican	January 2, 1939	December 14, 1954	Walter Samuel Goodland	71/3
24		Fred R. Zimmerman	Republican	January 2, 1939	December 14, 1954	Oscar Rennebohm	71/3
24		Fred R. Zimmerman	Republican	January 2, 1939	December 14, 1954	Walter J. Kohler Jr.	71/3
vacant				December 14, 1954	December 16, 1954	Walter J. Kohler Jr.	1/3 (Note: Vacant due to death of secretary of state.)
25		Louis Allis	Republican	December 16, 1954	January 3, 1955	Walter J. Kohler Jr.	1/3 (Note: Appointed to fill vacancy.)
26		Glenn Wise	Republican	January 3, 1955	January 7, 1957	Walter J. Kohler Jr.	1 (Note: Before his death, Zimmerman was elected to a ninth term as secretary of state, to last from 1955 until 1957. Wise was appointed to fill this term.)
27		Robert C. Zimmerman	Republican	January 7, 1957	January 6, 1975	Vernon W. Thomson	8 (Note: As per a 1967 amendment to the Wisconsin Constitution, Zimmerman's eighth term, beginning in 1971, was the first to last for 4 years)
27		Robert C. Zimmerman	Republican	January 7, 1957	January 6, 1975	Gaylord Nelson	8
27		Robert C. Zimmerman	Republican	January 7, 1957	January 6, 1975	John W. Reynolds Jr.	8
27		Robert C. Zimmerman	Republican	January 7, 1957	January 6, 1975	Warren P. Knowles	8
27		Robert C. Zimmerman	Republican	January 7, 1957	January 6, 1975	Patrick Lucey	8
28		Doug La Follette	Democratic	January 6, 1975	January 3, 1979	Patrick Lucey	1
28		Doug La Follette	Democratic	January 6, 1975	January 3, 1979	Martin J. Schreiber	1
29		Vel Phillips	Democratic	January 3, 1979	January 3, 1983	Lee S. Dreyfus	1
30		Doug La Follette	Democratic	January 3, 1983	March 17, 2023	Tony Earl	11 (Note: La Follette resigned on March 17, 2023, cutting his eleventh term short.)
30		Doug La Follette	Democratic	January 3, 1983	March 17, 2023	Tommy Thompson	11
30		Doug La Follette	Democratic	January 3, 1983	March 17, 2023	Scott McCallum	11
30		Doug La Follette	Democratic	January 3, 1983	March 17, 2023	Jim Doyle	11
30		Doug La Follette	Democratic	January 3, 1983	March 17, 2023	Scott Walker	11
30		Doug La Follette	Democratic	January 3, 1983	March 17, 2023	Tony Evers	11
31		Sarah Godlewski	Democratic	March 17, 2023	Incumbent	Tony Evers	1 (Note: Appointed to serve the remainder of La Follette's eleventh term following his resignation.)

== Other high offices held ==
This is a table of governorships, lieutenant governorships, congressional seats, and ranking diplomatic positions in foreign countries held by former Wisconsin secretaries of state.

Name	Term	Other offices held
William Barstow	1850–1852	Governor of Wisconsin
Louis Harvey	1860–1862	Governor of Wisconsin
James Lewis	1862–1864	Lieutenant Governor of Wisconsin; Governor of Wisconsin
Lucius Fairchild	1864–1866	Governor of Wisconsin; Minister to Spain
James Frear	1907–1913	Representative from Wisconsin
Merlin Hull	1917–1921	Representative from Wisconsin
Fred Zimmerman	1923–1927; 1939–1954	Governor of Wisconsin
