= Merlin Hull =

American politician (1870–1953)

Merlin Gray Hull
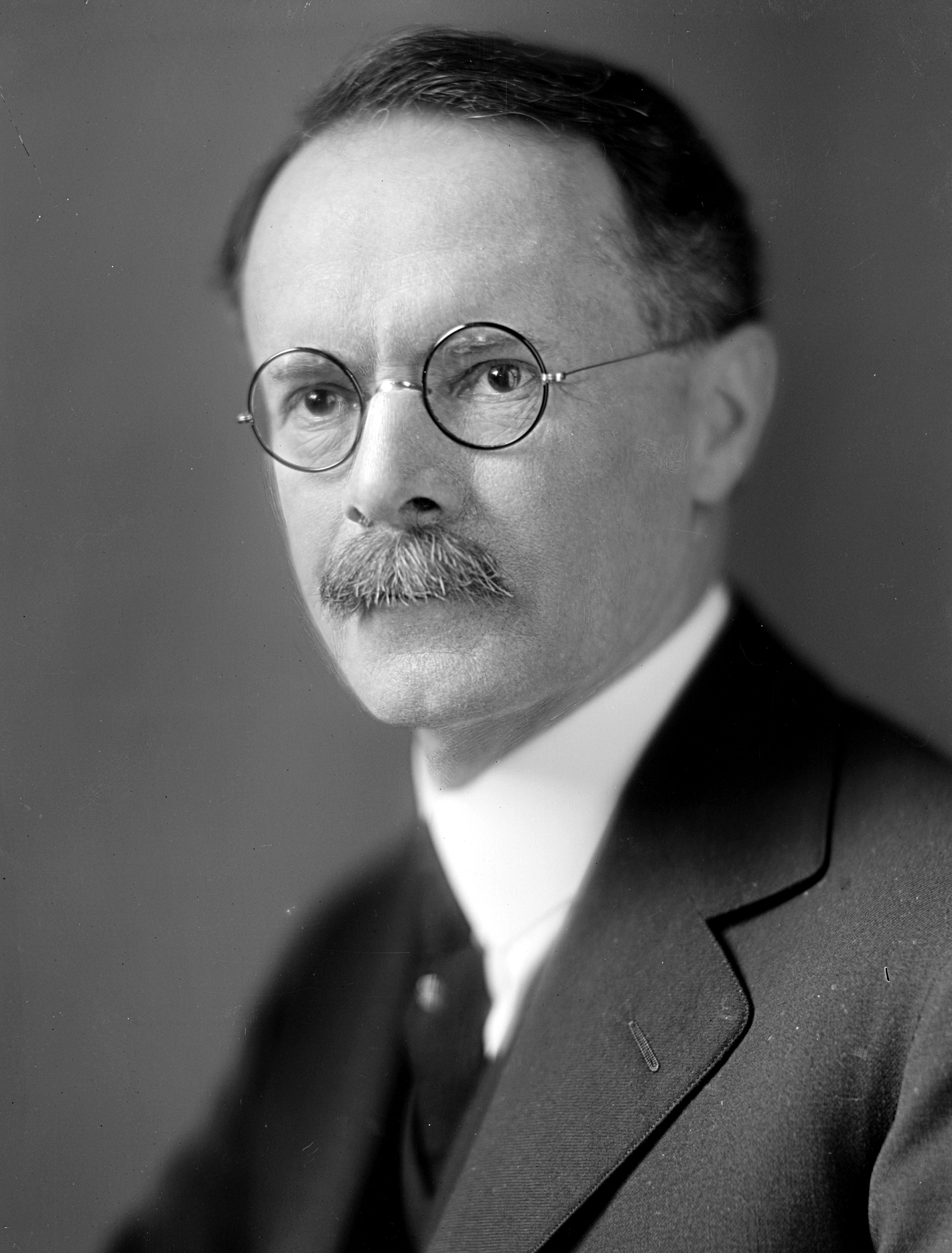

Member of the U.S. House of Representatives from Wisconsin
- In office January 3, 1935 – May 17, 1953
- Preceded by: James A. Frear
- Succeeded by: Lester Johnson
- Constituency: 9th district
- In office March 4, 1929 – March 3, 1931
- Preceded by: Joseph D. Beck
- Succeeded by: Gardner R. Withrow
- Constituency: 7th district

20th Secretary of State of Wisconsin
- In office January 1, 1917 – January 3, 1921
- Governor: Emanuel L. Philipp
- Preceded by: John S. Donald
- Succeeded by: Fred R. Zimmerman

45th Speaker of the Wisconsin State Assembly
- In office January 6, 1913 – January 4, 1915
- Preceded by: Charles A. Ingram
- Succeeded by: Lawrence C. Whittet

Member of the Wisconsin State Assembly from the Jackson County district
- In office January 4, 1909 – January 4, 1915
- Preceded by: John F. Baker
- Succeeded by: B. L. Van Gorden

Personal details
- Born: December 18, 1870 Farina, Illinois, U.S.
- Died: May 17, 1953 (aged 82) La Crosse, Wisconsin, U.S.
- Party: Republican; Wisconsin Progressive Party

Merlin Gray Hull (December 18, 1870 – May 17, 1953) was an American politician, lawyer, and newspaper publisher who served as a member of the United States House of Representatives from Wisconsin. Hull first served as a Republican in the 7th district from 1929 until 1931, after being defeated for re-nomination in 1930. He later served as a Progressive in the 9th district from 1935 until 1946, when he rejoined the Republican party and served as representative until his death in 1953.

Born in Farina, Illinois to John and Adelia Hull, Merlin Hull was a graduate of Gale College, De Pauw University, and Columbian University (now George Washington University Law School). He was admitted to the bar in 1894 and commenced practice in Black River Falls. He served as publisher of the Jackson County Journal from 1904 to 1926 and of the merged Banner-Journal for the rest of his life. He served as district attorney of Jackson County from 1907 to 1909; he was a Republican member of the Wisconsin State Assembly from 1909 to 1915, serving as speaker in the 1913-15 session; he was elected Secretary of State in 1916, serving until 1921.

Hull was first elected (as a Republican) to the Seventy-first Congress in 1928. He represented Wisconsin's 7th congressional district. He was an unsuccessful candidate for renomination in 1930 and an unsuccessful independent candidate in 1932. In 1934, Hull was reelected to the House of Representatives this time as part of the Seventy-fourth Congress, as a member of the Progressive Party and represented Wisconsin's 9th congressional district. He was reelected to this post for the succeeding nine congresses, as a member of the Progressive Party for the first six and after the disbanding of the Wisconsin Progressive Party, as a Republican to the other four, serving continuously from January 3, 1935, until his death from pulmonary complications following surgery in La Crosse, Wisconsin on May 17, 1953.

== See also ==
- List of secretaries of state of Wisconsin
- List of members of the United States Congress who died in office (1950–1999)

Party political offices
Preceded by John Donald	Republican nominee for Secretary of State of Wisconsin; 1916, 1918	Succeeded by Elmer Hall
Political offices
Preceded by John Donald	Secretary of State of Wisconsin; 1917–1921	Succeeded by Elmer Hall
U.S. House of Representatives
Preceded by Joseph D. Beck	Member of the U.S. House of Representatives from Wisconsin's 7th congressional district March 4, 1929 - March 3, 1931	Succeeded by Gardner R. Withrow
Preceded by James A. Frear	Member of the U.S. House of Representatives from Wisconsin's 9th congressional district January 3, 1935 - May 17, 1953	Succeeded by Lester Johnson
