= Thomas McHugh (politician) =

American politician in Wisconsin (1822–1856)

1st Secretary of State of Wisconsin
- In office June 7, 1848 – January 7, 1850
- Governor: Nelson Dewey
- Preceded by: Position Established
- Succeeded by: William A. Barstow

Personal details
- Born: Thomas Morris McHugh; November 22, 1822 Mohill, County Leitrim, Ireland, UK
- Died: March 19, 1856 (aged 33) Palatka, Florida
- Party: Democratic
- Parents: Stephen McHugh (father); Elizabeth Norris (mother)
- Profession: lawyer

Thomas Morris McHugh (November 22, 1822 – March 19, 1856) was an Irish American immigrant and lawyer who served as the first Secretary of State of Wisconsin. He had previously served as Secretary of the Territorial Council and the second Wisconsin Constitutional Convention.

== Biography ==
Thomas McHugh was born in County Leitrim, Ireland, to Elizabeth Norris and the Reverend Stephen McHugh. His father was an Episcopal minister. He studied law at Utica, New York, and moved with his parents to Delavan, in the Wisconsin Territory, in 1844, where his father established an Episcopal parish.

In 1847, McHugh was chosen as Secretary to the Wisconsin Territorial Council, and, in 1848, was Secretary for the second Wisconsin Constitutional Convention. In May 1848, he was elected the first Secretary of State of Wisconsin. He was admitted to the State Bar of Wisconsin in 1849. He later served as Chief Clerk to the Wisconsin State Assembly in the 1853 and 1854 sessions.

He died, unmarried, in Palatka, Florida, March 19, 1856.

Political offices
Preceded by John Catlin as Secretary of Wisconsin Territory	Secretary of State of Wisconsin; 1848–1850	Succeeded by William Barstow
