= Robert C. Zimmerman =

20th century American politician

27th Secretary of State of Wisconsin
- In office January 7, 1957 – January 6, 1975
- Governor: Vernon Wallace Thomson; Gaylord Nelson; John W. Reynolds Jr.; Warren P. Knowles; Patrick Lucey
- Preceded by: Glenn Wise
- Succeeded by: Doug La Follette

Personal details
- Born: January 5, 1910 Lake, Milwaukee County, Wisconsin, U.S.
- Died: January 17, 1996 (aged 86) Madison, Wisconsin, U.S.
- Resting place: Forest Hill Cemetery, Madison, Wisconsin
- Party: Republican
- Spouse: Dorothy F. McCurdy (m. 1941; died 1978)
- Parents: Fred R. Zimmerman (father); Amanda (Freedy) Zimmerman (mother)
- Nickname(s): "Bob", "Zim"

Military service
- Allegiance: United States
- Branch/service: United States Army
- Years of service: 1941–1943
- Rank: Sergeant
- Battles/wars: World War II

Robert Charles Zimmerman (January 5, 1910 – January 17, 1996) was an American government administrator and Republican politician. He was the 27th secretary of state of Wisconsin, serving from 1957 to 1975. His father was Fred R. Zimmerman, the 25th governor of Wisconsin and the 22nd & 24th secretary of state of Wisconsin.

== Biography ==
Robert Zimmerman was born in the town of Lake, in Milwaukee County, Wisconsin. The town of Lake no longer exists, and was mostly annexed into the city of Milwaukee in 1954. As a child, he moved with his family to Madison, Wisconsin, where his father was serving as secretary of state. He graduated from Madison Central High School.

When his father returned to the secretary of state's office in 1939, he hired Robert as a private secretary. In 1940, he appointed his son assistant secretary of state.

In January 1941, he was drafted into the United States Army, he served about 8 months and was then discharged in September 1941, when men over age 28 were exempted. He returned, briefly, to his job as assistant secretary of state, but after the attack on Pearl Harbor in December 1941, he was called back to service in the Army. He was promoted to corporal in June 1942, and was later promoted to sergeant. He spent his entire service at various bases in the continental United States, he was discharged due to disability in September 1943.

After returning from the Army, Zimmerman resumed his office as assistant secretary of state. He served in that role until his father's death in December 1954. In the November 1954 election, Robert was largely responsible for campaigning on behalf of his father, who was in poor health for most of the last years of his life after suffering a stroke.

Governor Walter J. Kohler Jr., appointed statistician Glenn Wise to fill the 1955–1956 term as secretary of state. In the 1956 election, Zimmerman launched a primary challenge against Wise, and prevailed with 57% of the vote. He went on to win the general election with 58% of the vote. He went on to win re-election eight times, serving eight two-year terms and one four-year term. He announced in January 1974 that he would not run for another term and would retire. Between Zimmerman and his father, they controlled the secretary of state's office for 38 years.

== Personal life and family ==
Robert Zimmerman was the older of two sons born to Fred R. Zimmerman and his wife Amanda (née Freedy) Zimmerman. Fred Zimmerman was a prominent Wisconsin Republican, he served ten terms (20 years) as secretary of state of Wisconsin, and served one term as governor of Wisconsin. He famously clashed with Republican U.S. senator Joseph McCarthy. Robert's younger brother, Frederick, also served in the Army during World War II.

Robert Zimmerman married Dorothy F. McCurdy of Madison, Wisconsin, on October 17, 1941. She died of cancer in 1978. They had no children.

Robert Zimmerman died at St. Mary's Hospital in Madison on January 17, 1996, just after his 86th birthday.

== Electoral history ==
=== Wisconsin Secretary of State (1956–1970) ===
Year	Election	Date	Elected				Defeated				Total	Plurality
1956	Primary	Sep. 11	Robert C. Zimmerman	Republican	248,281	57.49%	Glenn Wise (inc.)	Rep.	183,620	42.51%	431,901	64,661
1956	General	Nov. 6	Robert C. Zimmerman	Republican	888,706	58.48%	Marguerite R. Benson	Dem.	630,851	41.52%	1,519,557	257,855
1958	General	Nov. 4	Robert C. Zimmerman (inc.)	Republican	604,177	51.60%	Jerome J. Reinke	Dem.	566,606	48.40%	1,170,783	37,571
1960	General	Nov. 8	Robert C. Zimmerman (inc.)	Republican	930,547	55.65%	William H. Evans	Dem.	741,450	44.35%	1,671,997	189,097
1962	General	Nov. 6	Robert C. Zimmerman (inc.)	Republican	687,866	55.88%	Gerald Humphrey	Dem.	543,166	44.12%	1,231,032	144,700
1964	General	Nov. 3	Robert C. Zimmerman (inc.)	Republican	889,218	54.76%	Theodore J. Griswold	Dem.	734,503	45.24%	1,623,721	154,715
1966	General	Nov. 8	Robert C. Zimmerman (inc.)	Republican	692,807	61.25%	Cletus J. Johnson	Dem.	438,330	38.75%	1,131,137	254,477
1968	General	Nov. 5	Robert C. Zimmerman (inc.)	Republican	985,744	61.73%	Darryl D. Hanson	Dem.	611,194	38.27%	1,596,938	374,550
1970	General	Nov. 3	Robert C. Zimmerman (inc.)	Republican	804,002	61.71%	Robert A. Zimmerman	Dem.	487,584	37.42%	1,302,949	316,418
1970	General	Nov. 3	Robert C. Zimmerman (inc.)	Republican	804,002	61.71%	George D. Reed	Amer.	11,363	0.87%	1,302,949	316,418

Party political offices
Preceded by Fred R. Zimmerman	Republican nominee for Secretary of State of Wisconsin; 1956, 1958, 1960, 1962, 1964, 1966, 1968, 1970	Succeeded by Kent C. Jones
Political offices
Preceded by Glenn Wise	Secretary of State of Wisconsin; 1957–1975	Succeeded by Doug La Follette
