= William Froehlich =

American politician (1857–1942)

William H. Froehlich
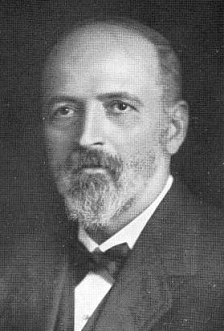

16th Secretary of State of Wisconsin
- In office January 2, 1899 – January 5, 1903
- Governor: Edward Scofield; Robert M. La Follette
- Preceded by: Henry Casson
- Succeeded by: Walter L. Houser

Member of the Wisconsin State Assembly from the Washington district
- In office January 7, 1895 – January 2, 1899
- Preceded by: August Konrad
- Succeeded by: Louis D. Guth

Personal details
- Born: June 22, 1857 Jackson, Washington County, Wisconsin, U.S.
- Died: January 31, 1942 (aged 84) Milwaukee, Wisconsin, U.S.
- Resting place: Graceland Cemetery, Milwaukee, Wisconsin
- Party: Republican
- Spouse: Clara (m. 1879–1942)
- Children: John A. Froehlich; Alfred B. Froehlich; Paul E. Froehlich; Robert J. Froehlich; George W. Froehlich; Amalia (Gumm); Minnie (Schmidt)

William Henry Froehlich (June 22, 1857 – January 31, 1942) was an American businessman and a Republican politician. He served as the 16th Secretary of State of Wisconsin, and served two terms in the Wisconsin State Assembly, representing Washington County.

== Biography ==
Born in Jackson, Washington County, Wisconsin, Froehlich graduated from Spencer Business College in Milwaukee, Wisconsin. He was a bookkeeper and clerk in Milwaukee and then went into business for himself in Jackson, in general merchandise and grain. He served as postmaster of Jackson from 1881 to 1893 and served on the school board from 1891 to 1899. He also served as town clerk and justice of the peace. In 1895 and 1897, Froehlich served in the Wisconsin State Assembly. He served as that state's sixteenth Secretary of State, serving two terms from January 2, 1899, to January 5, 1903. He was a Republican and served under governors Edward Scofield and Robert La Follette, Sr.

== Embezzlement ==
In 1923, Froehlich, who was the former cashier at the Jackson State Bank, pleaded guilty to embezzlement and was sentenced to prison. In 1925, Governor John Blaine gave a conditional pardon to Froehlich saying Froehlich did not have the criminal attitude to take advantage of people.

== Death ==
Froehlich worked for the Milwaukee County Park Board until he retired. He died in Milwaukee, Wisconsin, on January 31, 1942.

Party political offices
Preceded by Henry Casson	Republican nominee for Secretary of State of Wisconsin; 1898, 1900	Succeeded by Walter Houser
Wisconsin State Assembly
Preceded by August Konrad	Member of the Wisconsin State Assembly from the Washington district January 7, 1895 – January 2, 1899	Succeeded by Louis D. Guth
Political offices
Preceded by Henry Casson	Secretary of State of Wisconsin; January 2, 1899 – January 5, 1903	Succeeded by Walter Houser
