= 1978 Wisconsin Secretary of State election =

- November 7, 1978
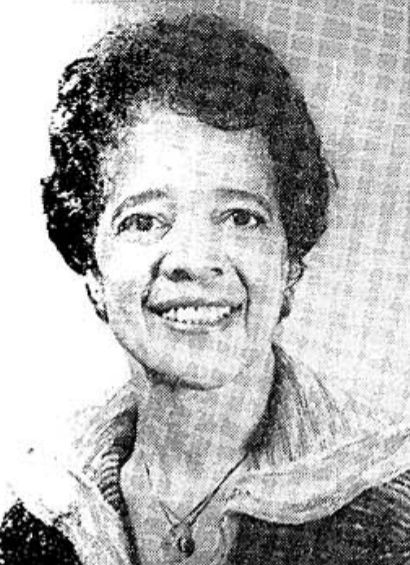

Nominee	Vel Phillips	Frederic A. Seefeldt
Party	Democratic	Republican
Popular vote	697,945	663,474
Percentage	50.4%	47.9%
- Phillips: 40–50% 50–60% 60–70% 80–90% Seefeldt: 40–50% 50–60% 60–70%
Secretary of State before election
Doug La Follette
Democratic
Elected Secretary of State
Vel Phillips
Democratic

The 1978 Wisconsin Secretary of State election took place on November 7, 1978, to elect the Secretary of State of Wisconsin. Incumbent Democrat Doug La Follette declined to seek re-election, instead running in the primary for Lieutenant Governor. Milwaukee Alderwoman and civil rights activist Vel Phillips was nominated in a field of 9 candidates and defeated Republican Frederic A. Seefeldt. Her election made her the first African American to be elected to a statewide office in Wisconsin.

== Democratic primary ==
=== Candidates ===
==== Nominee ====
- Vel Phillips, former Milwaukee Alderwoman and civil rights activist

==== Eliminated in primary ====
- Harvey J. Cooper
- Ada Deer, Native American activist and scholar
- Michael Jaliman
- Janet Soergel Mielke, former state representative and union officer
- Jan A. Olson
- Thomas F. St. John
- Benjamin Southwick
- Rita Wlodarczyk, former staffer for Frank Zeidler's mayoral campaign

=== Results ===
Results by county: Phillips: 10–20%; 20–30%; 30–40%; Deer: 10–20%; 20–30%; 30–40%; 70–80%; Southwick: 10–20%; 20–30%; 40–50%; Wlodarczyk: 10–20%; 20–30%; Mielke: 10–20%; 50–60%; Phillips–Deer Tie: 10-20%

Democratic primary results
Party	Candidate	Votes	%
Democratic	Vel Phillips	78,797	25.58%
Democratic	Ada Deer	46,696	15.16%
Democratic	Benjamin Southwick	37,791	12.27%
Democratic	Harvey J. Cooper	31,444	10.21%
Democratic	Jan A. Olson	31,027	10.07%
Democratic	Rita Wlodarczyk	30,473	9.89%
Democratic	Janet Soergel Mielke	25,251	8.20%
Democratic	Thomas F. St. John	14,182	4.60%
Democratic	Michael Jaliman	12,315	3.40%
Total votes		307,976	100.0%

== Republican primary ==
- Frederic A. Seefeldt ran unopposed in the primary

== Constitution primary ==
- George A. Myers ran unopposed in the primary

== General election ==
=== Results ===
1978 Wisconsin Secretary of State election
Party	Candidate	Votes	%	±%
Democratic	Vel Phillips	697,945	50.37%	%
Republican	Frederic A. Seefeldt	663,474	47.88%	%
Constitution	George A. Meyers	24,272	1.75%	%
Plurality		34,471	2.49%	-%
Total votes		1,385,691	100.0%	-%
Democratic hold				
