= James A. Frear =

American politician (1861–1939)

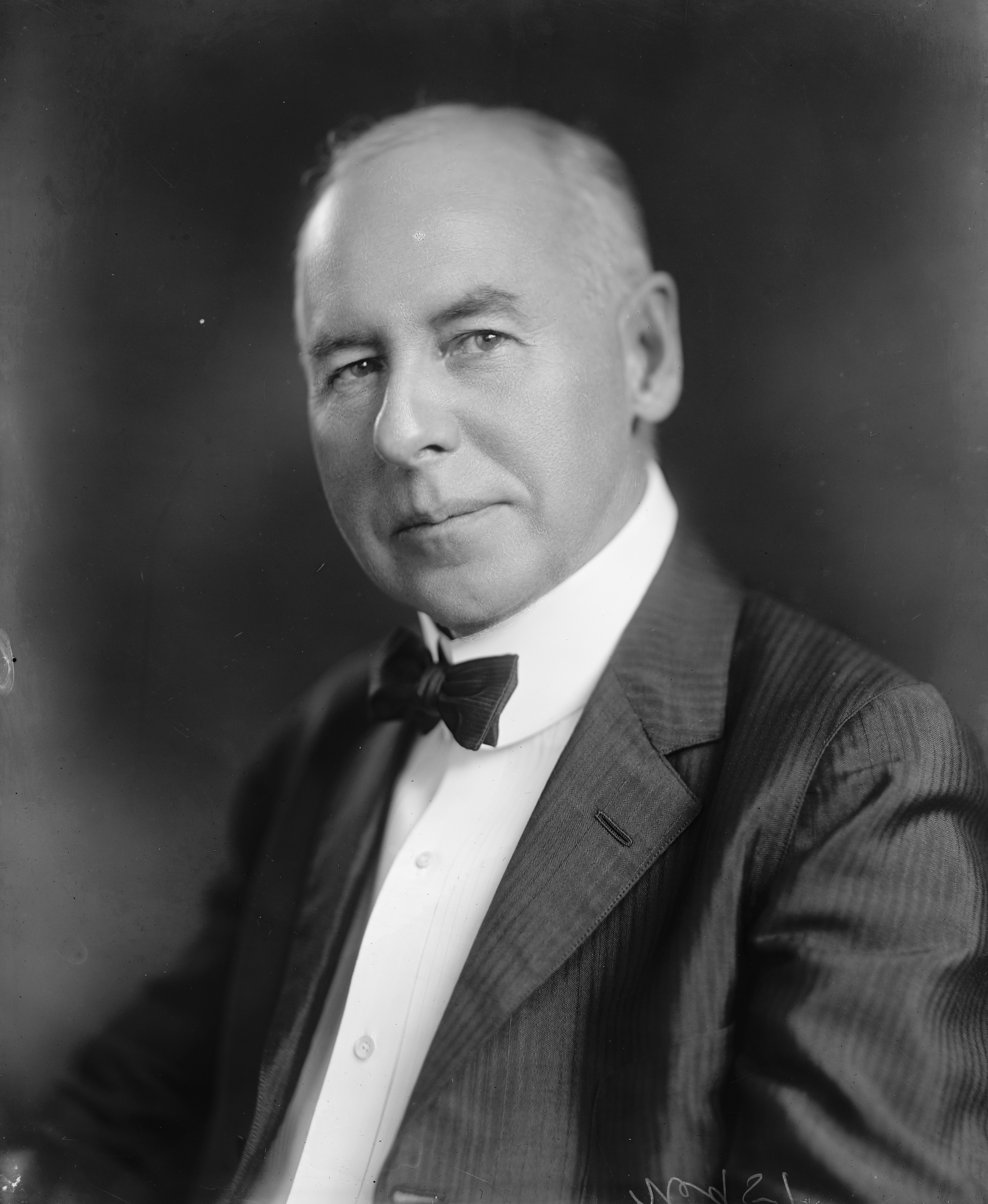

Member of the U.S. House of Representatives from Wisconsin
- In office March 4, 1913 – January 3, 1935
- Preceded by: Elmer A. Morse (10th); George J. Schneider (9th)
- Succeeded by: Hubert H. Peavey (10th); Merlin Hull (9th)
- Constituency: 10th district (1913-33); 9th district (1933-35)

Member of the Wisconsin State Senate
- In office 1905

Member of the Wisconsin State Assembly
- In office 1903

18th Secretary of State of Wisconsin
- In office January 7, 1907 – January 6, 1913
- Governor: James O. Davidson; Francis E. McGovern
- Preceded by: Walter L. Houser
- Succeeded by: John S. Donald

Personal details
- Born: October 24, 1861 Hudson, Wisconsin, U.S.
- Died: May 28, 1939 (aged 77) Washington, D.C., U.S.
- Party: Republican

James Archibald Frear (October 24, 1861 – May 28, 1939) was a U.S. representative from Wisconsin.

== Biography ==
Born in Hudson, Wisconsin, in St. Croix County, Wisconsin, Frear attended the public schools, and Lawrence University, Appleton, Wisconsin, in 1878.

He moved with his parents to Washington, D.C., in 1879. He served in the Signal Service, United States Army from 1879 to 1884. He graduated from the National Law University, Washington, D.C., in 1884. He was admitted to the bar the same year and commenced practice in Hudson, Wisconsin. He was city attorney of Hudson in 1894 and 1895. He served eleven years with the Wisconsin National Guard, retiring with the rank of colonel and judge advocate. He was elected district attorney of St. Croix County from 1896 to 1901. He was a member of the Wisconsin State Assembly in 1903. He then served in the Wisconsin State Senate in 1905. Frear became the Secretary of State of Wisconsin from 1907 to 1913.

Frear was elected as a Republican to the Sixty-third and to the ten succeeding Congresses (March 4, 1913 – January 3, 1935). On April 5, 1917, he voted against declaring war on Germany. For his first ten terms in office he represented Wisconsin's 10th congressional district, but for his last term in office, the 73rd Congress, he redistricted and represented Wisconsin's 9th congressional district. He was not a candidate for renomination in 1934. He resumed the practice of law in Washington, D.C., where he died May 28, 1939. He was interred in Arlington National Cemetery.

Party political offices
Preceded by Walter Houser	Republican nominee for Secretary of State of Wisconsin; 1906, 1908, 1910	Succeeded by John Donald
Political offices
Preceded by Walter Houser	Secretary of State of Wisconsin; 1907–1913	Succeeded by John Donald
U.S. House of Representatives
Preceded by Elmer A. Morse	Member of the U.S. House of Representatives from Wisconsin's 10th congressional district March 4, 1913 - March 3, 1933	Succeeded by Hubert H. Peavey
Preceded by George J. Schneider	Member of the U.S. House of Representatives from Wisconsin's 9th congressional district March 4, 1933 - January 3, 1935	Succeeded by Merlin Hull
