= John Scott Horner House =

Historic house in Wisconsin, United States

- U.S. National Register of Historic Places
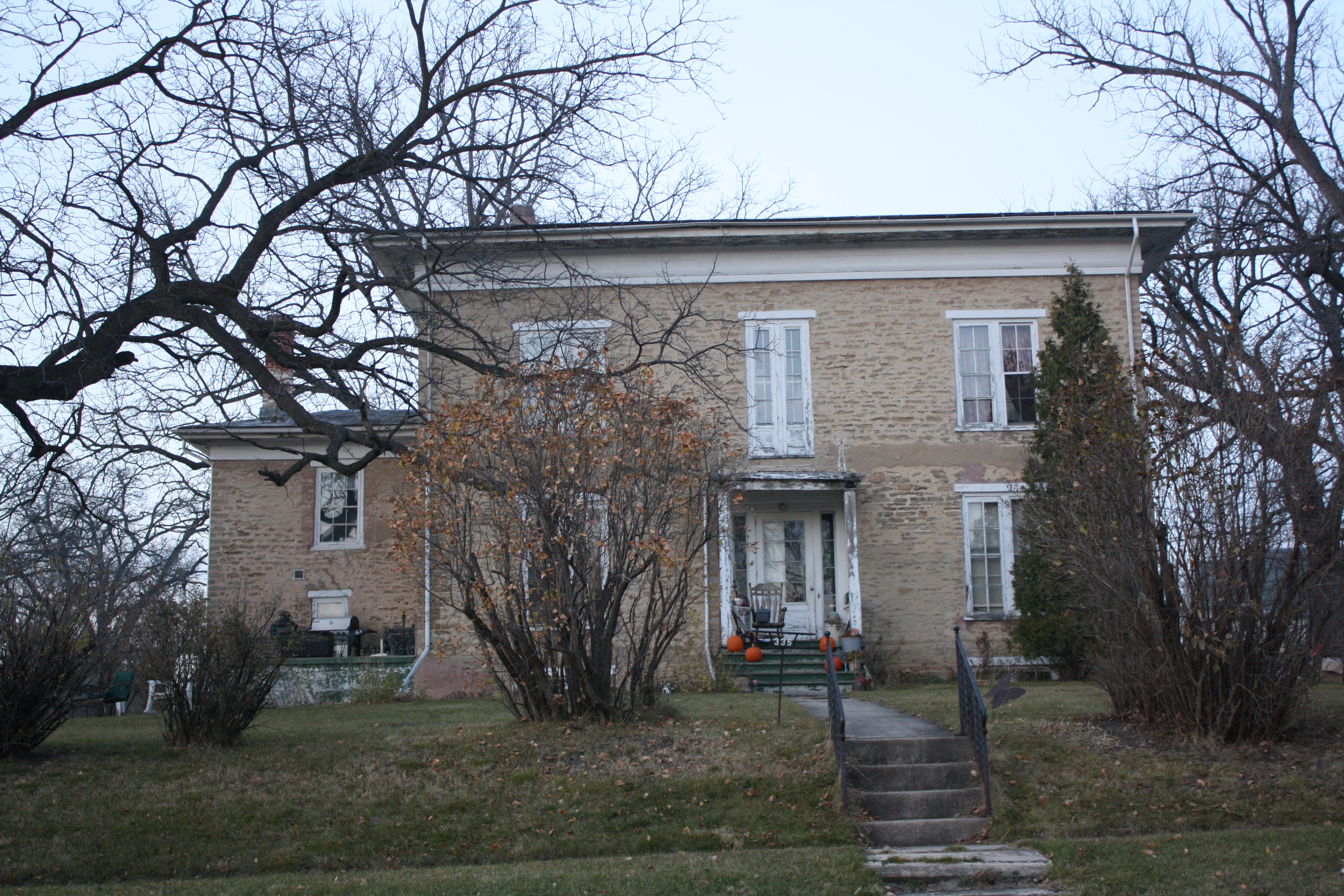
- John Scott Horner House
- Location: 336 Scott St., Ripon, Wisconsin
- Coordinates: 43°50′44″N 88°50′01″W
- Area: less than one acre
- Built: 1860
- Architectural style: Italianate
- NRHP reference No.: 84003672
- Added to NRHP: September 27, 1984

The John Scott Horner House is located in Ripon, Wisconsin.

== History ==
John Scott Horner was Governor of the Michigan Territory before becoming Secretary of the Wisconsin Territory. He would help to established Ripon, along with Ripon College. The house was listed on the National Register of Historic Places in 1984 and on the State Register of Historic Places in 1989.
