= Tia Nelson =

American politician

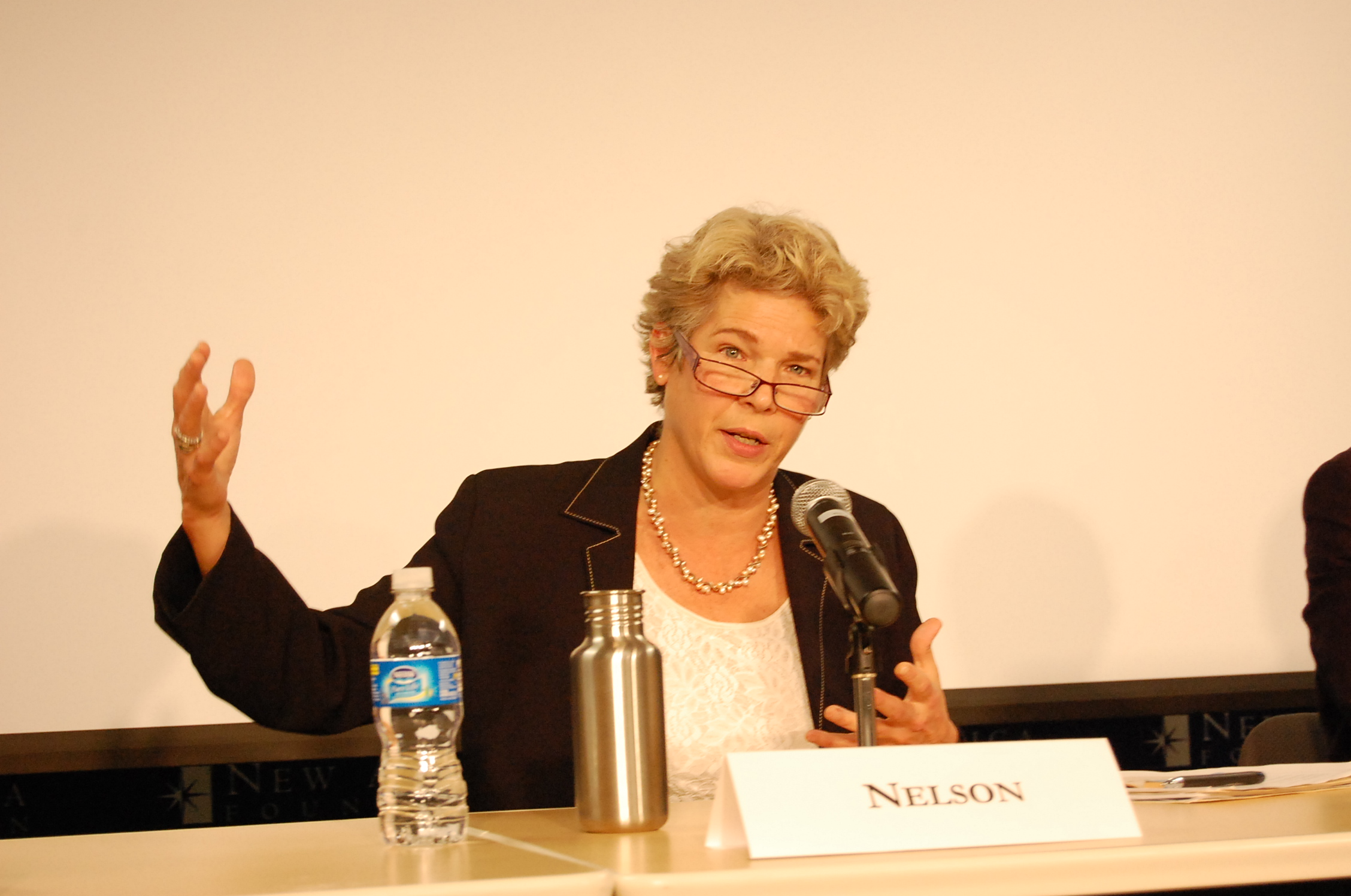
- Tia Nelson speaking as a panelist during "Understanding REDD" event

Executive Secretary of the Wisconsin Board of Commissioners of Public Lands
- Incumbent
- Assumed office 2026
- In office 2004–2015

Personal details
- Born: June 21, 1956 (age 70) Madison, Wisconsin, U.S.
- Party: Democratic
- Parent(s): Gaylord Nelson; Carrie Dotson Nelson
- Education: University of Wisconsin-Madison (BS)

Tia Lee Nelson (born June 21, 1956) is an American academic, environmental activist, and public servant from the state of Wisconsin, who has served as Executive Secretary of the Wisconsin Board of Commissioners of Public Lands since 2026. She previously held the position from 2004 to 2015, held several high-profile positions at The Nature Conservancy, and was managing director of the climate program at the Outrider Foundation. Nelson is the daughter of former United States Senator and Governor Gaylord Nelson, the founder of Earth Day.

== Early life ==
Nelson was born on June 21, 1956, in the Crestwood neighborhood of Madison, Wisconsin. She was two years old when her father was elected Governor of Wisconsin. She lived in the Executive Residence (Governor's Mansion) in Maple Bluff, Wisconsin, until the age of six, when her father was elected to United States Senate. She spent her upbringing in Washington, D.C., until graduating from high school and returning to Wisconsin to attend college. Nelson often accompanied her father during campaign stops throughout his political career.

== Career ==
After graduating from UW–Madison's school of wildlife ecology and clerking for the Wisconsin Assembly Committee on Natural Resources, Nelson joined The Nature Conservancy as legislative liaison for government relations. She spent 17 years with the organization, also holding posts as a senior policy advisor for the Latin America and Caribbean Division and then, as the first director of the Conservancy's Global Climate Change Initiative. During her time with the group, Nelson worked in more than 25 countries, and was in Rio de Janeiro in 1992 when President George H. W. Bush signed the United Nations Framework Convention on Climate Change at the Earth Summit, the U.S. commitment to help fight global warming.

While at The Nature Conservancy, Nelson advocated for forest protection and restoration as a critical climate change mitigation strategy and an essential component of public policies to address global warming. She led the development of pilot carbon sequestration projects in Belize, Bolivia, and Brazil, where she helped create standards for the measurement and verification of the greenhouse gas benefits of conservation and improved timber management. The Rio Bravo project in Belize was the first one of its kind in the world to be certified by the U.S. Initiative on Joint Implementation, and earned her the Climate Protection Award in 2000 from the Environmental Protection Agency.

In 2004, Nelson returned home to Wisconsin to serve as Executive Secretary to the Wisconsin Board of Commissioners of Public Lands (BCPL), which included an appointment in 2007 as co‐chair of Wisconsin's Task Force on Global Warming. In July 2005, Nelson spoke at her father's memorial service which was held at the Wisconsin Capitol Building. Nelson introduced Michelle Obama during a rally before the 2008 presidential primary in Wisconsin. In 2009, Nelson testified before the U.S. House Energy and Commerce Committee regarding the American Clean Energy and Security Act. The legislation would have cut carbon dioxide and other greenhouse gases by 20 percent by 2020 and by 83 percent by mid-century.

While serving as Executive Secretary to the BCPL, Nelson was ordered to never discuss climate change on state time by two of the three board members—the Attorney General and the State Treasurer. The Attorney General later changed his position on the "gag" order and went on to express strong support for Nelson's job performance in a letter released to the press. Nelson left her post at the state agency in 2015 and is currently the managing director of the Climate program at the Outrider Foundation, a Madison, Wisconsin group which works to end the threat of a nuclear war and reverse global climate change. Nelson introduced U.S. Senator Bernie Sanders at an October 2016 Madison rally for Democratic presidential candidate Hillary Clinton. Nelson voiced her support for Clinton and U.S. Senate Candidate Russ Feingold based on their advocacy for clean energy policies.

In 2026, Nelson returned to her prior position of Executive Secretary of the Wisconsin Board of Commissioners of Public Lands.

== Other roles ==
- Through the UW-Madison Nelson Institute and Wisconsin Historical Society, Nelson helped launch www.nelsonearthday.net, a site which houses the Gaylord Nelson Collection.
- Nelson is a trustee emeritus at the Northland College Board and has served on the boards of the Earth Day Network, Gathering Waters Conservancy, Cool Choices, and the Friends of the Apostle Islands.
- She is also an emeritus board member of the UW-Madison Nelson Institute of Environmental Studies Board of Visitors.
- Nelson is a member of the ecoAmerica Board of Directors.
- Nelson has served as an advisor to several councils including the World Bank's Bio Carbon Fund, the Chicago Climate Exchange, and the Climate Neutral Network.

== Awards ==
- 2000: Climate Protection Award by the United States Environmental Protection Agency.
- 2006: The Environmental Lifetime Achievement Award by Keep Greater Milwaukee Beautiful.
- 2012: David Engleson Award by Wisconsin Association for Environmental Education.
- 2015: Environmental Leader Award by the University of Wisconsin-Stevens Point.
