= Vel Phillips =

American judge and politician (1924–2018)

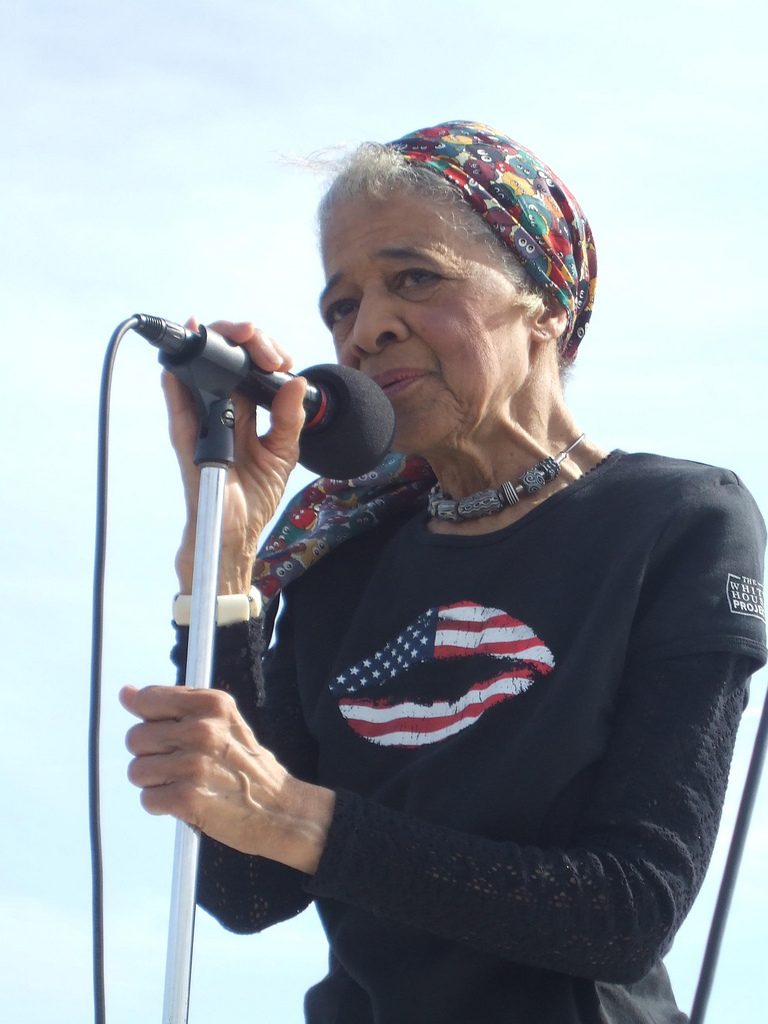
- Phillips at March on Milwaukee in 2007

29th Secretary of State of Wisconsin
- In office January 3, 1979 – January 3, 1983
- Governor: Lee S. Dreyfus
- Preceded by: Doug La Follette
- Succeeded by: Doug La Follette

Personal details
- Born: Velvalea Hortense Rodgers; February 18, 1924 Milwaukee, Wisconsin, U.S.
- Died: April 17, 2018 (aged 94) Milwaukee, Wisconsin, U.S.
- Party: Democratic
- Education: Howard University; University of Wisconsin–Madison Law School

Velvalea Hortense Rodgers "Vel" Phillips (February 18, 1924 – April 17, 2018) was an American attorney, politician, jurist, and civil rights activist, who served as an alderperson and judge in Milwaukee, Wisconsin, and as secretary of state of Wisconsin (1979–1983). She was the first African American woman to graduate from the University of Wisconsin Law School; the first African American, as well as the first woman, elected Alderwoman to the Milwaukee Common Council; and the first African American, as well as the first woman, to serve as a jurist in Wisconsin.

Until 2023, she was the only person other than Doug La Follette to serve as Wisconsin's secretary of state for nearly 50 years.

== Early life and background ==
Vel Phillips was born in Milwaukee, Wisconsin on February 18, 1924, to Thelma and Russel Rodgers and had two siblings. Her father owned a restaurant for a few years and was a cook. Her mother had three rules for her children, they could not smoke, drink, or talk loudly. As a high school student, she entered a speaking contest and won the prize of scholarship of her choice, in which she chose Howard University in Washington D.C..

One instance that was a major influence on her life was on a Sunday morning when she was in church with white friends in college and she was escorted out by ushers. At this time Washington was still segregated and people of color were not allowed to worship there. She said, “this lit a fire within her” because she thought it was wrong to be treated that way and “it is not as it should be”.

After graduating she returned to Milwaukee and started to volunteer at a branch of the NAACP. This is where she met Dale Philips. Once married they moved to Madison and attended law school together. They moved to a new place called Badger Village, a white middle-class neighborhood with small apartments. Once living there for a short period of time the people living there made a petition because she was living there and was African American. They chose to move to a more friendly unnamed trailer park nearby. Once graduated the couple were the first African American couple to graduate from the university of Wisconsin Law School. After graduation they opened their own firm Philip and Philips in Milwaukee. Shortly after they decided to start a family. During this time she joined a League of women voters to register her neighbors to vote.

As a civil rights activist, Vel Phillips worked for fair housing and racial justice in Milwaukee. She was also a member of the Milwaukee Turners.

== Career ==
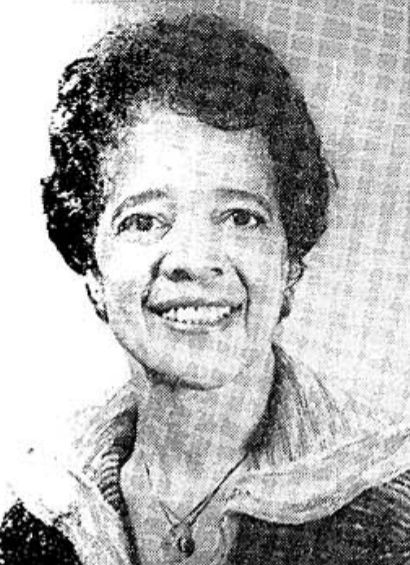
Phillips as secretary of state.

In 1953, Phillips ran for a seat on the school board of the Milwaukee Public Schools, and was the first black candidate to make it past the non-partisan citywide primary election, though she lost the runoff. Both she and her husband became active locally in the National Association for the Advancement of Colored People (NAACP) in support of a city redistricting referendum (there were at that time no black members of Milwaukee's Common Council). In 1955, Phillips legally changed her first name from Velvalea to Vel. In 1956, Phillips became the first woman and the first African-American member of the Common Council in Milwaukee; since Common Council members were called "Alderman," she was given the title "Madam Alderman" by local officials. She would remain the only woman and only black member of that body for many years to come. Phillips frequently participated in nonviolent civil rights protests against discrimination in housing, education, and employment during the 1960s. Phillips first proposed an ordinance in 1962 to outlaw housing discrimination. In 1968 the Milwaukee Common Council approved a desegregation law, only after a federal housing law was passed. She was arrested at a rally following the firebombing of an NAACP office, the only city official to be arrested during the "long hot summer" of 1967, bringing further national media attention to the city.

Phillips mentored baseball player Hank Aaron about civil rights and how he could contribute to the civil rights movement during Aaron's time playing for the Milwaukee Braves.

Phillips resigned from the Common Council in 1971 when appointed to the judiciary becoming the first female judge in Milwaukee County and the first African American judge in Wisconsin. She lost her bid for reelection to the bench to a white candidate who made an issue of her involvement in protests and civil rights activities. She subsequently served as a lecturer at UW–Milwaukee and a visiting professor at Carroll College and UW–Madison Law School.

In 1978, Phillips made history as the first woman and first non-white elected Secretary of State in Wisconsin (although Glenn Wise had been appointed Secretary of State of Wisconsin 23 years earlier). Incumbent Democratic Secretary of State Doug La Follette ran unsuccessfully for Lieutenant Governor and Phillips won the highly fractured nine-candidate Democratic primary with just 25.6%, though she did finish more than 10% ahead of the second-place candidate, Native American advocate and scholar Ada Deer. In the general election, she defeated Republican Frederic A. Seefeldt with 50.4% of the vote. During a brief absence of both the Governor and Lieutenant Governor, under Wisconsin law she served as Acting Governor (she later joked that "the men hurried back" when they realized they had left a woman in charge). Although Phillips lost the Democratic primary in 1982 (to La Follette, who took 51.1% to Deer's 30.9% and Phillips' 12.4%), she was the highest-ranking woman to win state office in Wisconsin in the 20th century. A lifelong Democrat, she was also the first black person to be elected as a member of the National Committee of either of the major U.S. political parties.

== Active retirement ==
After leaving office, Phillips remained active in the community, serving on the boards of the Wisconsin Conservatory of Music and America's Black Holocaust Museum. In 2002, Phillips was appointed "Distinguished Professor of Law" at the Marquette University School of Law, where she is also reported to be producing a first-person memoir of Milwaukee's civil rights movement. She chaired the successful congressional campaign of Gwen Moore, Wisconsin's first African-American and Milwaukee's first female member of the United States House of Representatives. She also served on the board of the Vel Phillips Foundation, a charitable foundation created in 2006, whose mission is "to help establish equality and opportunity for minorities through social justice, education, equal housing opportunities, and jobs."

In August 2011, the University of Wisconsin–Madison announced that it had renamed one of its residence halls for Phillips.

In March 2014, the Wisconsin Alumni Association awarded Phillips its Distinguished Alumni Award.

== Death and legacy ==
Vel Phillips died at 95 in Milwaukee, Wisconsin, on April 17, 2018. On August 7, 2018, North 4th Street from St. Paul Avenue to Capitol Drive was renamed Vel R. Phillips Avenue in her honor, which includes the new Fiserv Forum arena's official address. On November 22, 2021, the Madison Metropolitan School District's Board of Education voted unanimously to rename what was James Madison Memorial to Vel Phillips Memorial High School as of the start of the 2022–23 school year.

In 2021, Wisconsin's Capitol and Executive Residence Board unanimously voted to erect a statue of Phillips on the Wisconsin State Capitol grounds. That statue was unveiled on July 27, 2024; it is the first outdoor sculpture on the capitol grounds of any American state of an African-American woman.

== See also ==
- List of African-American jurists
- List of first women lawyers and judges in Wisconsin

Party political offices
Preceded by Doug La Follette	Democratic nominee for Secretary of State of Wisconsin; 1978	Succeeded by Doug La Follette
Political offices
Preceded by Doug La Follette	Secretary of State of Wisconsin; 1979–1983	Succeeded by Doug La Follette
