= Walter Houser =

American politician (1885–1928)

Walter L. Houser

16th Secretary of State of Wisconsin
- In office January 5, 1903 – January 7, 1907
- Governor: Robert M. La Follette; James O. Davidson
- Preceded by: William Froehlich
- Succeeded by: James A. Frear

Walter L. Houser (May 6, 1855 – April 7, 1928) was a politician from the U.S. state of Wisconsin. He served as that state's seventeenth Secretary of State of Wisconsin, serving two terms from January 5, 1903 to January 7, 1907. He was a Republican and served under governors Robert La Follette, Sr. and James O. Davidson.

He resided in Mondovi, Wisconsin at the time of his election, where he also served as mayor.

== Notes ==
Party political offices
Preceded by William Froehlich	Republican nominee for Secretary of State of Wisconsin; 1902, 1904	Succeeded by James A. Frear
Political offices
Preceded by William Froehlich	Secretary of State of Wisconsin; 1903–1907	Succeeded by James Frear
