= Theodore Dammann =

American politician (1869–1946)

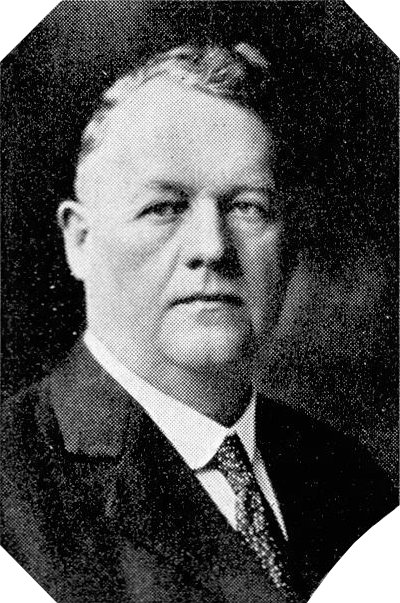
- Dammann c. 1929

23rd Secretary of State of Wisconsin
- In office January 3, 1927 – January 2, 1939
- Governor: Fred R. Zimmerman; Walter J. Kohler Sr. Philip La Follette; Albert G. Schmedeman
- Preceded by: Fred R. Zimmerman
- Succeeded by: Fred R. Zimmerman

Personal details
- Born: November 4, 1869 Milwaukee, Wisconsin, U.S.
- Died: January 16, 1946 (aged 76) Milwaukee, Wisconsin, U.S.
- Cause of death: Stroke
- Resting place: Forest Home Cemetery, Milwaukee
- Party: Progressive (1934–1946); Republican
- Spouse: Alma Othelia Ulbricht (m. 1896–1946)
- Children: Ruth Emma (Effler)^{(b. 1897; died 1977)}; Mildred Joy (Singer)^{(b. 1903; died 1962)}
- Education: Concordia College
- Occupation: Haberdasher, hotelier, politician

Theodore Dammann (November 4, 1869 – January 16, 1946) was an American haberdasher, hotelier, and progressive politician from Milwaukee, Wisconsin. He was the 23rd secretary of state of Wisconsin, serving six terms from 1927 to 1939. He began his political career as a progressive Republican, supporting Robert M. "Fighting Bob" La Follette, and was first elected to office as a Republican; he joined the Wisconsin Progressive Party founded by La Follette's sons in 1934, and won his final two terms running on the Progressive ticket.

At the time of his death, he held the record as Wisconsin's longest-serving partisan statewide officeholder, but was soon after surpassed by his successor Fred R. Zimmerman.

== Biography ==
Theodore Dammann was born in Milwaukee, Wisconsin, on November 4, 1869. The son of a Lutheran pastor, he attended Concordia College, at the time located in Milwaukee, now known as Concordia University Wisconsin, located in Wisconsin. For twenty years, he operated a haberdashery in Milwaukee.

He became involved in politics with the Republican Party of Wisconsin as a supporter of Wisconsin governor and later U.S. senator Robert M. "Fighting Bob" La Follette. Dammann first held political office as treasurer of Milwaukee County, serving from 1912 to 1919.

In 1920, he became treasurer of the Milwaukee County Republican Committee, and held that position for the next 15 years. In 1920, he was also a delegate to the 1920 Republican National Convention, supporting La Follette.

Dammann was the progressive candidate for Wisconsin secretary of state in the 1926 Republican primary. The progressive slate won nearly all of the statewide Republican primaries, the exception being the gubernatorial race, where Herman Ekern was defeated by Fred Zimmerman. The Republican primary in this era was more important than the general election, as no other party could seriously contest the statewide general elections in Wisconsin. Dammann easily won his general election, and was re-elected in 1928 and 1930.

Dammann was the only Republican statewide officeholder to survive the Democratic wave election of 1932. Two years later, he joined the Wisconsin Progressive Party when it split from the Republicans. He won his 5th and 6th terms as secretary of state running on the Progressive Party ticket in 1934 and 1936. In 1936, Dammann was also named president of the National Association of Secretaries of State. In 1938, he was endorsed for governor by the Farmer-Labor Progressive Federation, but declined their nomination and sought another term as secretary of state alongside progressive gubernatorial candidate Philip La Follette. The Progressive slate was wiped out in the 1938 general election; Dammann was defeated by his predecessor, the former governor Fred Zimmerman.

After leaving office, Dammann worked as assistant manager of the Republican Hotel in Milwaukee.

Dammann died on January 17, 1946, after suffering a stroke.

Party political offices
Preceded by Fred R. Zimmerman	Republican nominee for Secretary of State of Wisconsin; 1926, 1928, 1930, 1932	Succeeded by John F. Jardine
First	Progressive nominee for Secretary of State of Wisconsin; 1934, 1936, 1938	Succeeded by Adolph W. Larsen
Political offices
Preceded by Fred R. Zimmerman	Secretary of State of Wisconsin; 1927–1939	Succeeded by Fred R. Zimmerman
