= Wisconsin Board of Commissioners of Public Lands =

Wisconsin state government agency

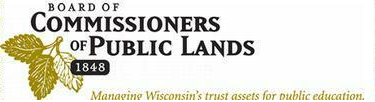

Agency overview
- Formed: May 29, 1848
- Jurisdiction: Wisconsin
- Headquarters: 101 E. Wilson Street, 2nd Floor, Madison, Wisconsin 53703
- Employees: 9.5
- Annual budget: $1,584,000 (2021-23)
- Agency executive: Tia Nelson, Executive Secretary
- Parent agency: Department of Administration
- Website: http://bcpl.wisconsin.gov/

The Board of Commissioners of Public Lands, otherwise known as BCPL, is a state agency responsible for investing Wisconsin's school trust funds in support of public education, for managing the state's remaining school trust lands, and for maintaining an extensive archive of land records. The board was established by Article X, Sections 7 and 8 of the Wisconsin Constitution, ratified in 1848, making it Wisconsin's oldest extant state agency.

== History and endowment purposes ==
Following the failed adoption by popular referendum of Wisconsin's first state constitution in April 1846, a second constitutional convention was convened later that year. The second constitutional convention - as was the first - was bitterly divided on a number of public policy issues, including women's right to own property, immigrants' right to vote, banking regulations, and even the nascent state's boundaries. On one matter however, delegates were in near-unanimous agreement: the creation of a permanent endowment for public education, derived from school trust lands appropriated from the federal public domain and granted to the young state by Congress upon its entry into the Union. The creation of said "school trust funds" was deemed necessary by the convention to assure sufficient protection of the land grants from discounted speculation and poor management practices. In furtherance of these objects, the constitutional convention - led by an Eleazer Root, who would later serve as the first Superintendent of Public Instruction - authored Article X of the present state constitution. Largely unchanged to this day, Article X provides for, among other matters, a uniform system of public schools, a state university at the seat of government, and the elected constitutional office of Superintendent of Public Instruction to supervise public education in every school district. Perhaps most importantly however, Article X created BCPL to manage and sell all school trust lands granted to the state and to invest the funds arising therefrom subject to constitutionally mandated restrictions. The resulting disposition of the school trust lands, whether by sale or by continued management, constitute what is today an endowment of four school trust funds worth over $1.6 billion, the principal of which is inviolate and can never be reduced.

=== Common School Fund ===
The Common School Fund was created at statehood from the sale of the 16th section in each of Wisconsin's townships; this amounted to almost 1,000,000 acres (1,600 mi^{2}). The U.S. Congress later added to the Common School Fund's principal by allocating an additional 500,000 acres (780 mi^{2}) of common school lands. Most of the land grant was quickly sold in BCPL's early years, with only some 7,000 acres (11 mi^{2}) remaining today. Along with the proceeds of land sales and trust land revenues, the state constitution also guarantees to the Common School Fund all fines, fees, and forfeitures collected by the counties for violations of the criminal laws, together with unclaimed and escheated property that accrues to the state. As a result of these sources, the Common School Fund has a market value of over $1.4 billion as of November 2023. Income from the Common School Fund is annually apportioned by the Superintendent of Public Instruction and remitted to the Department of Administration for distribution to every school district as school library aid. These annual distributions are the only source of statewide aid for Wisconsin's public school libraries.

The Common School Fund was valued at $1.56 billion as of June 30, 2025, according to BCPL reports.

=== Normal School Fund ===
The Normal School Fund was created in 1865 from the proceeds of half of the land grant conveyed to Wisconsin by Congress in the Swamp Land Act of 1850, after the Legislature determined not all of the swampland was needed for drainage purposes. The resulting land grant amounted to some 1,500,000 acres (2,300 mi^{2}) of public land, of which approximately 70,000 acres (110 mi^{2}) remain under management. The Normal School Fund was originally intended to provide financial support to normal schools, or state teacher colleges. However, following the merger of Wisconsin's state teacher colleges with the University of Wisconsin System in 1971, the Normal School Fund now primarily finances scholarships and environmental studies programs at the University of Wisconsin System.

The Normal School Fund was valued at $39 million as of June 30, 2025, according to BCPL reports.

=== University Fund ===
The University Fund was created from congressional grants in 1838 and 1854 of four townships, some 92,000 acres (144 mi^{2}), to support a land-grant university. Neither Congress nor the Legislature provided for additional revenues to the University Fund following the sale of all but 80 acres (0.13 mi^{2}) of the university lands. Interest on trust fund principal is distributed annually from the University Fund to support the libraries at the University of Wisconsin–Madison.

=== Agricultural College Fund ===
The Agriculture College Fund was created from the proceeds of the land grant allocated to the state by the Morrill Land-Grant Colleges Act. The state received 240,000 acres (380 mi^{2}) of land under this Act. Neither Congress nor the Legislature provided for additional revenues to the Agricultural College Fund following the rapid sale of the agricultural college lands. Interest on trust fund principal is distributed annually from the Agricultural College Fund to the University of Wisconsin–Madison, the state's land-grant university.

== Assets under management ==
=== Land portfolio ===
BCPL was organized upon statehood to oversee the sale and management of Wisconsin's school trust lands, public lands allotted by Congress to finance primary, secondary and post-secondary public education at a time when the United States was a land rich but cash poor nation. Once encompassing over 3 million acres, a little less than 77,000 acres (310 km^{2}) of the original land grant remains under BCPL's stewardship; these lands are largely forested and therefore harvested for sustainable timber. BCPL also engages in sales of school trust lands in exchange for more productive parcels. Land sales are by private sale and either paid with cash or through mortgaged installments. The remaining school trust lands are accessible to the public without fee for hunting, fishing, trapping, hiking, and other appropriate outdoor recreational activities. BCPL prioritizes efficient and sustainable land management practices that not only generate increasing returns to beneficiaries but which also support timber productivity, forest health, water quality protection, biodiversity conservation, and enhanced public access.

=== Investment portfolio ===
BCPL prudently invests the school trust funds in a diversified portfolio of bonds, stock, real estate, securities and private capital to support public schools and the University of Wisconsin System. As part of its diversified investments, BCPL furthers asset appreciation by issuing loans from the school trust funds to Wisconsin's 3,000-plus municipalities and school districts as part of its State Trust Fund Loan Program. These "State Trust Fund Loans" are generally used to finance school building repairs and maintenance, municipal infrastructure projects, capital equipment and vehicles, pension liability refinancing, debt refinancing, and local economic development projects, among other public purposes. Principal and interest on loans are payable annually at BCPL's office in downtown Madison, Wisconsin.

== Agency organization and operations ==
=== Land commissioners ===
Wisconsin's founders had concerns about the concentration of political power and did not want either the Governor or the Legislature to control the school trust corpus. Instead, management of the school trust lands and investment of the school trust funds was vested in a board of three ex officio "Commissioners of Public Lands" which, in accordance with Article X, Section 7 of the Wisconsin State Constitution, are the duly elected Secretary of State, State Treasurer, and Attorney General. Wisconsin's "land commission model" for independently managing school trust lands and investments proved successful and served as an example to states west of Wisconsin as they gradually joined the Union. In fact, all but a handful of the Western states - including Arizona, Arkansas, Minnesota, New Mexico, Texas, and Washington - adopted Wisconsin's land commission model.

=== Staff ===
The three commissioners are supported by an Executive Secretary and a professional staff of civil servants to carry out the day-to-day operations of the agency. Tia Nelson, daughter of late governor and U.S. Senator Gaylord Nelson, previously served as Executive Secretary of the BCPL from October 2004 to July 2015. She was succeeded by Jonathan Barry, who in turn was succeeded by longtime Deputy Secretary Tom German following the former's retirement on January 4, 2020. German retired at the end of 2025 and the land commissioners reappointed Nelson for a second time in January 2026.

=== Professional affiliations ===
BCPL is a member of the National Association of State Trust Lands, an organization that represents America's state land commissioners.

== Board composition ==
-2023–2027 term-from March 18, 2023
Member	Office	Since	Party
Josh Kaul	Attorney General	January 7, 2019	Democratic
John Leiber	Treasurer	January 3, 2023	Republican
Sarah Godlewski, chair	Secretary of State	March 18, 2023	Democratic

January 3 through March 17, 2023
Member	Office	Since	Party
Doug La Follette, chair	Secretary of State	January 3, 1983	Democratic
Josh Kaul	Attorney General	January 7, 2019	Democratic
John Leiber	Treasurer	January 3, 2023	Republican

-2019–2023 term-
Member	Office	Since	Party
Doug La Follette	Secretary of State	January 3, 1983	Democratic
Josh Kaul	Attorney General	January 7, 2019	Democratic
Sarah Godlewski, chair	Treasurer	January 7, 2019	Democratic

-2015–2019 term-
Member	Office	Since	Party
Doug La Follette, chair (to March 17, 2015)	Secretary of State	January 3, 1983	Democratic
Brad Schimel, chair (from March 17, 2015)	Attorney General	January 5, 2015	Republican
Matt Adamczyk	Treasurer	January 5, 2015	Republican
