= Elmer Hall =

American politician (1866–1952)

Personal details
- Born: September 12, 1866 New London, Wisconsin, U.S.
- Died: May 22, 1952 (aged 85) Green Bay, Wisconsin, U.S.
- Resting place: Fort Howard Cemetery
- Party: Republican
- Spouse: Emma Taylor (m. 1890)
- Occupation: Politician

Elmer Stephen Hall (September 12, 1866 – May 22, 1952) was an American politician from Wisconsin. He served as a member of the Wisconsin Senate, the 21st Wisconsin Secretary of State and as the 26th mayor of Green Bay.

== Early life ==
Elmer Stephen Hall was born on September 12, 1866, in New London, Wisconsin. He was raised by his grandparents in Green Bay. He attended school until fourth grade. At the age of 16, he was assistant postmaster at the Fort Howard post office.

== Career ==
Hall worked as a railway car checker, postal clerk and letter carrier. In 1895, he was a member of the consolidation committee of Fort Howard and Green Bay. He was elected as county clerk of Brown County in 1904. He served as county clerk for 12 years.

Hall served on the draft board for World War I. He served as the 26th mayor of Green Bay for five years, during World War I and until January 1921. He was the first mayor under the new commission form of government in Green Bay. He became the 21st Wisconsin Secretary of State in 1921 and served for two years. He was appointed by Governor John J. Blaine as conservation commissioner of Wisconsin in 1923 and served in that role until 1928. He was a Republican. He served in the Wisconsin Senate, representing district 2, from 1929 to 1932. He was defeated for re-election in 1932.

Hall was secretary of the commercial club, forerunner of the Association of Commerce. He was a member of the Green Bay choral society. He was a self-taught astronomer and published Solution of Lunar Motion by Diagram (with Harmonic Table) in 1935 and Gyro-static Mechanics of Earth's Moons System in 1944.

== Personal life ==
Hall married Emma Taylor of Fond du Lac on January 20, 1890.

Hall died on May 22, 1952, at the Hilltop Nursing Home on West Mason Street in Green Bay. He was buried in Fort Howard Cemetery.

== Notes ==
Party political offices
Preceded by Merlin Hull	Republican nominee for Secretary of State of Wisconsin; 1920	Succeeded by Fred R. Zimmerman
Political offices
Preceded by Merlin Hull	Secretary of State of Wisconsin; 1921–1923	Succeeded by Fred Zimmerman
