= Alexander Pope Field =

19th century American politician

21st Attorney General of Louisiana
- In office 1872 – August 19, 1876
- Governor: P. B. S. Pinchback; William Pitt Kellogg
- Preceded by: Simeon Belden
- Succeeded by: William H. Hunt

6th Illinois Secretary of State
- In office 1829–1840
- Governor: Ninian Edwards; John Reynolds; William Lee D. Ewing; Joseph Duncan; Thomas Carlin
- Preceded by: George Forquer
- Succeeded by: Stephen A. Douglas

4th Secretary of the Wisconsin Territory
- In office April 23, 1841 – October 30, 1843
- Appointed by: John Tyler
- Governor: Henry Dodge; James Duane Doty
- Preceded by: Francis J. Dunn
- Succeeded by: George R. C. Floyd

Personal details
- Born: Alexander Pope Field; November 30, 1800 Louisville, Kentucky
- Died: August 19, 1876 (aged 75) Louisiana
- Party: Republican; Whig (before 1854); Democratic (before 1841)
- Spouses: Eliza Worthington Owings; (m. 1841; died 1863)
- Children: Alice Owings (Smith)^{(b. 1843; died 1940)}; Alexander Pope Field^{(b. 1846; died 1868)}; Julia Eliza (Dutcher)^{(b. 1849; died 1897)}; Eugene Field^{(b. 1852; died 1900)}
- Parents: Abner Field (father); Jane (Pope) Field (mother)
- Profession: lawyer, politician

Military service
- Allegiance: United States
- Branch/service: United States Army
- Battles/wars: Black Hawk War

Alexander Pope Field (November 30, 1800 – August 19, 1876) was an American lawyer and politician who served as the 21st Attorney General of Louisiana, the 6th Illinois Secretary of State, and the 4th Secretary of the Wisconsin Territory. His party affiliation shifted during his career.

== Early life and education ==
Born on November 30, 1800, in Louisville, Kentucky. He moved to Jonesboro, Illinois, studied law, and was admitted to the Illinois bar. His uncle was judge Nathaniel Pope.

== Career ==
From 1822 until 1828, Field served in the Illinois House of Representatives as a Democrat and supported Andrew Jackson. He later became a Whig.

He served in the United States Army including in the Black Hawk War of 1832 and was brigade inspector. From 1829 until 1840, he served as Illinois Secretary of State.

Field moved to Wisconsin Territory and served as the territory's secretary from 1841 to 1843. He then moved to Saint Louis, Missouri, in 1845.

In 1849, Field moved to New Orleans, Louisiana. In 1864 during the American Civil War, Field was elected to U.S. Congress in the second district of Louisiana, however he was not allowed to take his seat. Field assaulted Hon. William D. Kelley from Pennsylvania with a penknife. Maximilian F. Bonzano was also elected to the 38th United States Congress the same year in 1864 for the first district of Louisiana, and Bonzano was also not allowed to take his seat after the assault.

Field was elected Louisiana Attorney General serving from 1873 until his death.

== Notes ==
Political offices
Preceded by George Forquer	Secretary of State of Illinois; 1829–1840	Succeeded by Stephen A. Douglas
Legal offices
Preceded by Simeon Beldon	Attorney General of Louisiana; 1873–1876	Succeeded by William H. Hunt
