= George Rogers Clark Floyd =

American politician (1810–1895)

George Floyd
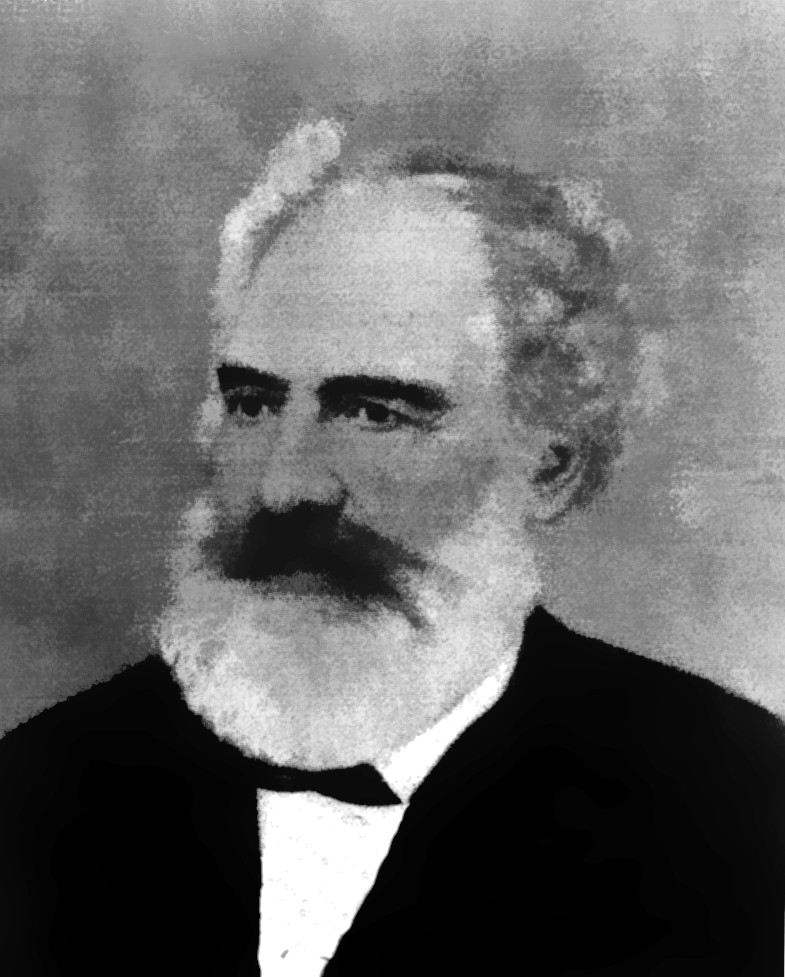
- Portrait of Floyd at an unknown date

5th Secretary of Wisconsin Territory
- In office October 30, 1843 – February 24, 1846
- Appointed by: John Tyler
- Governor: James Duane Doty; Nathaniel P. Tallmadge; Henry Dodge
- Preceded by: Alexander Pope Field
- Succeeded by: John Catlin

Member of the West Virginia House of Delegates from the Logan district
- In office November 19, 1872 – December 31, 1873
- Preceded by: H. S. White
- Succeeded by: C. J. Stone

Personal details
- Born: September 13, 1810 Christiansburg, Virginia
- Died: May 7, 1895 (aged 84) Logan County, West Virginia
- Spouse: Ellen Mead
- Relations: John B. Floyd (brother)
- Children: John B. Floyd
- Parents: John Floyd (father); Lelitia (Preston) Floyd (mother)
- Occupation: Farmer and businessman

George Rogers Clark Floyd (September 13, 1810 – May 7, 1895) was an American politician and businessman. He served as the Secretary of the Wisconsin Territory from 1843 to 1846, and served in the West Virginia House of Delegates from 1872 to 1873.

== Family ==
Floyd was born in Christiansburg, Virginia, son of former Virginia Governor John Floyd and Lelitia (Preston). Floyd was the brother of Virginia Governor John B. Floyd. He married Ellen Mead and they had eight children, including John B. Floyd (November 13, 1854 – April 15, 1935) who also went to serve in the West Virginia House of Delegates and West Virginia Senate.

== Career ==
President John Tyler appointed Floyd as Secretary of the Wisconsin Territory on October 30, 1843, and served in this capacity until February 24, 1846, when a successor was appointed. He continued to live in Dane County, Wisconsin Territory, and served as colonel of the Dane County militia from 1846 to 1847. He returned to Wythe County, Virginia, where he became a farmer. He operated a coal and salt property in Warfield, Kentucky, but the business did not do well. Augustus C. Dodge, of Iowa brought forward a joint resolution in the United States Senate on July 12, 1852, for the "relief of George R. C. Floyd, late Secretary of Wisconsin Territory, and sureties..." It was referred to the Committee on Finance. It passed the Senate, for on July 27, 1852, it was presented to the United States House of Representatives. He sold his property to his brother John B. Floyd on March 3, 1857, and moved to Logan County, West Virginia, to look after some mineral and timber property he had an interest in. In 1872, he was elected as a delegate to the West Virginia House of Delegates, serving in the 11th West Virginia Legislature, which convened shortly after the election in 1872 and adjourned in December 1873.

== Notes ==
Political offices
Preceded by Alexander Field	Secretary of Wisconsin Territory; 1843–1846	Succeeded by John Catlin
