= Gilbert Poor =

American politician

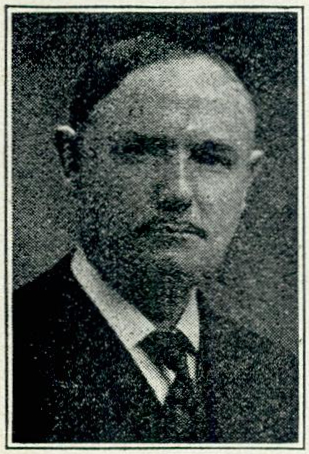
Poor's official State Assembly portrait, 1917

Gilbert H. Poor (October 18, 1866 – death date unknown) was a homesteader, newspaper publisher and machinist who served as a Socialist member of the Milwaukee Common Council and of the Wisconsin State Assembly.

== Background ==
Poor was born in Murphysboro, Illinois on October 18, 1866. When he was eleven, his family emigrated with his parents to Kansas and farmed there. He received his education in public schools, but quit while in the eighth grade. In 1888 he moved to southern Louisiana and took a Government homestead, which he later gave up. (He was later to publish a 90-page booklet, Blazing a trail: The story of a pioneer socialist agitator [Milwaukee: The Cooperative Printing Co., 1911], which he described as "Interesting sketches written by Gilbert H. Poor... first socialist agitator and first state organizer of Louisiana.") One historian describes him as a clergyman from Louisiana.

In 1896 he established a reform newspaper which eventually took up the cause of socialism. After running the paper about four years, the plant was destroyed by fire. In 1904 he came to Milwaukee, worked one year as an assistant engineer and then became a machinist.

== Elective office ==
In 1908 Poor lost to Republican Fred R. Zimmerman in a three-way race for the 8th Milwaukee County district (8th and 23d Wards of the City of Milwaukee) State Assembly seat, with 1159 votes to 1703 votes for Zimmerman and 1697 for Democrat Harry R. McLogan.

Poor was elected to represent the Eighth Ward in the Milwaukee Common Council in the 1910 Socialist sweep which gave them an absolute majority in that body; but served only one two-year term.

He was elected to the Assembly in 1916 to represent Milwaukee County (the Fifth Ward of the City) to succeed Democrat Charles J. Stemper (who did not seek re-election). Poor received 818 votes against 807 for Democrat Otto Battger (or Batger; both spellings are found) and 778 for Republican William Leben. He was assigned to the standing committee on insurance and banking.

Poor did not run for reelection in 1918, and was succeeded by Republican John Kaney.
