= John S. Horner =

American politician

John Scott Horner
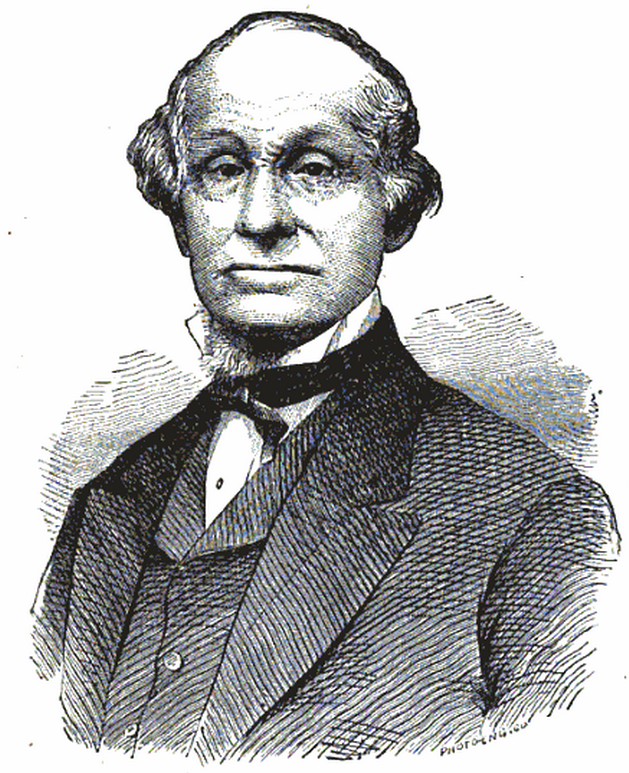

4th Territorial Governor of Michigan
- In office 1835–1836
- Preceded by: Stevens T. Mason
- Succeeded by: Stevens T. Mason as State Governor

Secretary of Wisconsin Territory
- In office 1836–1837
- Succeeded by: William Slaughter

Personal details
- Born: December 5, 1802 Warrenton, Virginia, U.S.
- Died: February 3, 1883 (aged 80) Ripon. Fond du Lac County, Wisconsin, U.S.
- Resting place: Hillside Cemetery; Ripon, Fond du Lac County, Wisconsin U.S.
- Spouse: Harriet L. Watson
- Parent(s): Gustavus Brown Horner; Frances Harrison Scott Horner
- Profession: Farmer; Attorney; Politician

John Scott Horner (December 5, 1802 – February 3, 1883) was a U.S. politician, secretary and acting governor of Michigan Territory, 1835–1836 and secretary of Wisconsin Territory, 1836–1837.

== Early life ==
Horner was born in what is now Warrenton, Virginia, the third of eight children of Gustavus Brown Horner and Frances Harrison Scott Horner. He attended a private boarding school near Middleburg, Virginia run by a Scottish Presbyterian clergyman. He attended Washington College (now known as Washington and Jefferson College) in Washington County, Pennsylvania, graduating in 1819. He then studied law, was admitted to the bar in Virginia and maintained a successful private practice in Fauquier, Loudoun, and Rappahannock counties. In October, 1834, Horner married Harriet L. Watson, the daughter of James Watson, U.S. Senator from New York.

== Political career ==
On August 15, 1835, President Andrew Jackson appointed Horner to be Secretary (and acting Governor) of the Michigan Territory, replacing the popular Stevens T. Mason. The circumspect Horner knew he was entering office in a volatile situation. Michigan had satisfied all the requirements set out in the Northwest Ordinance to become a state, however the U.S. Congress had repeatedly rejected or ignored Michigan's petition for statehood, due to two very contentious issues:

1. There was an acrimonious border dispute with the state of Ohio, which became known as the Toledo War.
2. Southern slave states were reluctant to increase the number of northern free states.

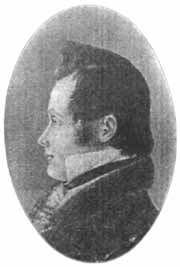

Jackson, facing reelection in 1836, did not want to alienate Ohio, with its many electoral votes. So he removed the popular Mason from office. Mason was agitating for statehood and was, at that time, unyielding in demands regarding the Toledo Strip. At Mason's urging, Michigan had drafted a constitution on its own without the sanction of an Enabling Act from Congress. The people adopted the constitution in October 1835 and at the same time elected Mason as governor along with a full slate of state officials (the state government was not recognized by Congress until 1837, when Michigan became a state).

So Horner had to appease irate Ohioans as well as deal with an unauthorized, but popular local government that undermined his own authority as Territorial Governor. Horner was at least partially successful, in that he helped to avert violence (aside from some minor scuffles) and persuaded both parties to wait for the upcoming session of Congress to propose a resolution. Despite heading alternate governments, there was little disagreement between Mason and Horner, with Horner mostly staying out of the way in local politics.

In August 1835, while Michigan prepared itself for statehood, Mason had separated all of the territory which was not going to be part of the state into a separate jurisdiction in order to provide some continuity in governance. Horner had replaced Mason as Territorial Secretary in the interim and was to assume responsibility for the western territory. But he was delayed for various reasons and the western area had its own government for a time without any official representative of the federal government. Congress organized the Wisconsin Territory on July 3, 1836, and Horner assumed the office of Secretary, leaving the de facto, if unrecognized, government of the state of Michigan to Mason.

As Secretary of the Wisconsin Territory, Horner's first acts were to administer the oaths of office to Governor Henry Dodge and the judges of the supreme court with Charles Dunn as chief justice, and William C. Frazer and David Irvin as associate justices.

In June 1837, Jackson transferred Horner to become Register of the Green Bay Land Office. Horner resisted requests by friends and relatives to move back east to Virginia, and in 1847, Horner moved to a farm on the south shore of Green Lake in present-day Green Lake County. In 1849, he was elected probate judge for Marquette County (which then included Green Lake County). He held this office until the court was abolished in 1854.

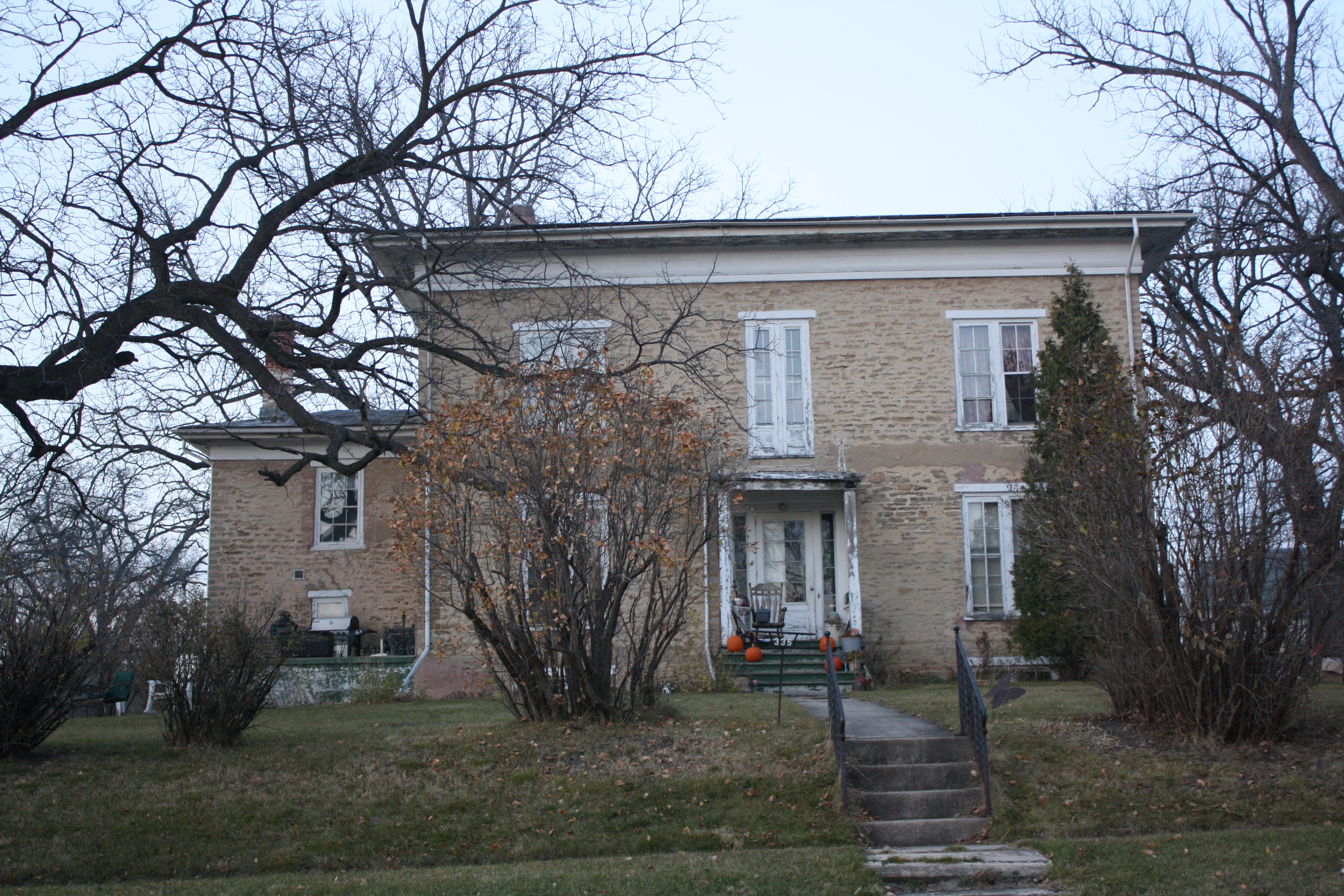
Horner's house in Ripon, listed on the National Register of Historic Places as the John Scott Horner House

== Later life ==
Horner was one of the original settlers of the present day city of Ripon, Wisconsin. In 1851, Horner also helped establish Ripon College. His former home, now known as the John Scott Horner House, is listed on the National Register of Historic Places.

== Death ==
Horner died in Ripon in Fond du Lac County, Wisconsin, at the age of eighty. He is interred at Hillside Cemetery, Ripon, Wisconsin.

== Family life ==
He married Harriet L. Watson (1805–1883) in October 1834, who died two months after him in Ripon.

Political offices
Preceded by Stevens T. Mason	Territorial Governor of Michigan; 1835–1836	Succeeded by Stevens T. Mason; State Governor
New creation	Secretary of Wisconsin Territory; 1836–1837	Succeeded by William Slaughter
