= August Konrad =

American politician

August Konrad was a member of the Wisconsin State Assembly. He was elected to the Assembly in 1890 and 1892. Additionally, Konrad was a member of the county board of Washington County, Wisconsin from 1883 to 1888 and again in 1890. He was a Democrat. Konrad was born on September 17, 1849, in Milwaukee, Wisconsin.
