= Glenn Wise =

American politician (1896–1991)

26th Secretary of State of Wisconsin
- In office January 3, 1955 – January 7, 1957
- Governor: Walter J. Kohler Jr.
- Preceded by: Louis Allis
- Succeeded by: Robert C. Zimmerman

Personal details
- Born: Glenn Evelyn Miller; July 14, 1896 Wyocena, Wisconsin, U.S.
- Died: September 24, 1991 (aged 95) Madison, Wisconsin, U.S.
- Resting place: Forest Hill Cemetery, Madison
- Party: Republican
- Spouse: John Edwin Wise (m. 1924; died 1968)
- Children: John Edwin Wise Jr.; (b. 1927; died 1999)
- Education: Milwaukee-Downer College (B.A.); University of Wisconsin (M.A.)
- Occupation: Statistician

Glenn Evelyn Miller Wise (July 14, 1896 – September 24, 1991) was an American statistician, and Republican politician from Sauk County, Wisconsin. She was the 26th secretary of state of Wisconsin, from 1955 to 1957; appointed by Governor Walter J. Kohler Jr. after the death of Secretary of State Fred R. Zimmerman, she was the first woman to hold statewide office in Wisconsin.

== Early life and education ==
Glenn Wise was born Glenn Evelyn Miller on July 14, 1896, in Wyocena, Wisconsin. As a child, she moved with her parents to La Valle in Sauk County, where she was raised and educated. She graduated from Reedsburg Area High School, then earned a B.A. at Milwaukee-Downer College in 1917, and an M.A. in economics at the University of Wisconsin in 1919.

== Career ==
She was employed as a secretary in the Department of Economics of UW for two years, then went into business as the organizer and director of the Employment Exchange of the Washington School for Secretaries in Washington, D.C., before taking employment as a statistician at the University of Wisconsin. She was active in the Republican Party, being a particularly avid supporter of Wendell Willkie.

== Office ==
Miller was appointed Secretary of State of Wisconsin by Governor Kohler on January 3, 1955, to fill the vacancy caused by the death in office of Secretary of State Fred R. Zimmerman, becoming Wisconsin's first woman Secretary of State. Zimmerman's son, Robert C. Zimmerman defeated her in the 1956 Republican primary. Wise remained an active and steadfast Republican.

== Personal life and family ==
Glenn Evelyn Miller was the elder of two children born to country doctor William J. Miller and his wife Bertha (née Muggleton). Her father served several years as deputy state health officer after practicing medicine in Sauk County for more than 25 years.

Glenn Miller took the last name Wise when she married John Edwin Wise in 1924; he later became chief electrical engineer for the State of Wisconsin, and died in 1968. Glenn Wise was active in the Presbyterian church and civic activities; when she died at the age of 95, she left behind one son (John Jr.), five grandchildren and six great-grandchildren.

Political offices
Preceded by Louis Allis	Secretary of State of Wisconsin; 1955–1957	Succeeded by Robert Zimmerman
