= Louis Allis =

American politician (1916–1994)

25th Secretary of State of Wisconsin
- In office December 16, 1954 – January 3, 1955
- Governor: Walter J. Kohler Jr.
- Preceded by: Fred R. Zimmerman
- Succeeded by: Glenn Wise

Personal details
- Born: Louis Allis Jr. April 14, 1916 Milwaukee, Wisconsin, U.S.
- Died: March 26, 1994 (aged 77) Scottsdale, Arizona, U.S.
- Party: Republican
- Occupation: Politician, industrialist

Military service
- Allegiance: United States
- Branch/service: United States Navy
- Battles/wars: World War II

Louis Allis Jr. (April 14, 1916, in Milwaukee, Wisconsin – March 26, 1994, in Scottsdale, Arizona) was an American politician and industrialist. Allis started working for the Louis Allis Company in the 1940s and served in the United States Army during World War II.

From December 16, 1954, until January 3, 1955, Louis Allis was Secretary of State of Wisconsin following the death of Fred R. Zimmerman who died in office.

Political offices
Preceded by Fred Zimmerman	Secretary of State of Wisconsin; 1954–1955	Succeeded by Glenn Wise
