= William B. Slaughter (politician) =

American politician (1797–1879)

William Banks Slaughter (April 27, 1797 – July 15, 1879) was an American politician.

== Biography ==
Born in Culpeper County, Virginia, on April 27, 1797, Slaughter was educated at the College of William & Mary. In 1826, he moved to Bardstown, Kentucky, to read law and be admitted to the Kentucky bar. Later, he moved to Bedford, Indiana, where he practiced law and was later elected to the Indiana House of Representatives.

In 1832, Slaughter introduced resolutions in the Indiana General Assembly supporting President Andrew Jackson and the Nullification Crisis involving South Carolina; the resolutions passed the Indiana General Assembly. Slaughter was appointed Register of the Land Office by Andrew Jackson in Indianapolis, and was transferred to Green Bay, which was in Michigan Territory. In 1835, he became one of the first white settlers to take possession of land claims in the area of Madison, Wisconsin, in present Middleton. Slaughter was elected to the Michigan Territorial Legislature and helped with the creation and organization of the Wisconsin Territory. In 1837, President Jackson appointed Slaughter secretary of the Wisconsin Territory and he served until 1841. In 1845, Slaughter retired to Virginia, but returned to Wisconsin because of the American Civil War. He was appointed by President Abraham Lincoln to oversee the commissary and later was quartermaster at Jefferson Barracks Military Post, Missouri. In 1878, Slaughter published a book, titled Reminiscences of distinguished men. He died in Madison.

In 1838, a county was named in honor of William Slaughter in what is now Iowa. Citizens were dissatisfied with the name and the county was renamed Washington County in 1839.
