= Wisconsin Territory =

Territory of the US between 1836–1848

Coordinates: 44°N 90°W

Territory of Wisconsin
- Organized incorporated territory of the United States
- 1836–1848
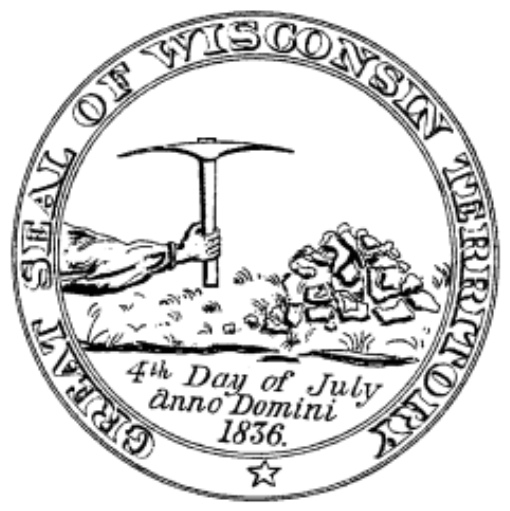
- Territorial seal

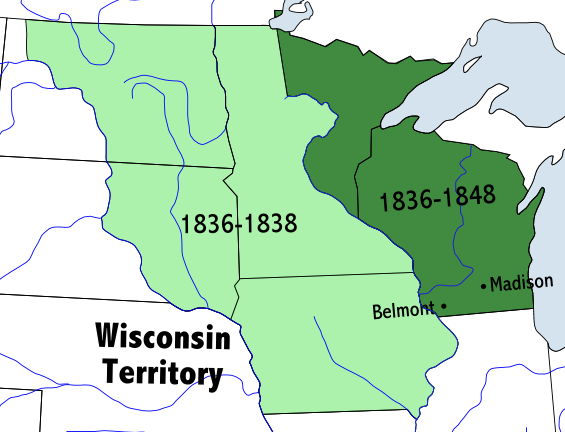
- Map of the Wisconsin Territory, 1836–1848
- Capital: Madison (1838–1848); Burlington (1837); Belmont (July–December 1836)
- Government
  - Type: Organized incorporated territory
- Governor
  - 1836–1841: Henry Dodge
  - 1841–1844: James Duane Doty
  - 1844–1845: Nathaniel P. Tallmadge
  - 1845–1848: Henry Dodge
  - 1848: John Catlin (acting)
- Legislature: Legislative Assembly of the Territory of Wisconsin
- History
  - Organic Act effective: July 3, 1836
  - Iowa Territory split off: July 4, 1838
  - Statehood of Wisconsin: May 29, 1848
Preceded by
Michigan Territory
Succeeded by
Wisconsin
Iowa Territory
Minnesota Territory

The Territory of Wisconsin was an organized and incorporated territory of the United States that existed from July 3, 1836, until May 29, 1848, when an eastern portion of the territory was admitted to the Union as the State of Wisconsin. Belmont was initially chosen as the capital of the territory. In 1837, the territorial legislature met in Burlington, just north of the Skunk River on the Mississippi, which became part of the Iowa Territory in 1838. In that year, 1838, the territorial capital of Wisconsin was moved to Madison.

== Territorial area ==
The Wisconsin Territory initially included all of the present-day states of Wisconsin, Minnesota, and Iowa, as well as part of the Dakotas east of the Missouri River. Much of the territory had originally been part of the Northwest Territory, which was ceded by Britain in 1783. The portion in what is now Iowa and the Dakotas was originally part of the Louisiana Purchase, though a small fraction was part of a parcel ceded by Great Britain in 1818, and was split off from the Missouri Territory in 1821 and attached to the Michigan Territory in 1834.

The portion that was formerly part of the Northwest Territory and which later became the state of Wisconsin was part of the Indiana Territory when this was formed in 1800. In 1809, it became part of the Illinois Territory; then, when Illinois was about to become a state in 1818, this area was joined to the Michigan Territory. Then the Wisconsin Territory was split off from Michigan Territory in 1836 as the state of Michigan prepared for statehood. In 1838, the section of the territory to the west of the Mississippi became the Iowa Territory.

In 1838, the Iowa Territory was formed, reducing the Wisconsin Territory to the boundaries for the next ten years; upon granting statehood to Wisconsin, its boundaries were once again reduced, to their present location.

In 1850, 10 years after the end of the Second Great Awakening (1790–1840), of the 341 churches with regular services in the Wisconsin, 110 were Methodist, 64 were Catholic, 49 were Baptist, 40 were Presbyterian, 37 were Congregationalist, 20 were Lutheran, 19 were Episcopal, and 2 were Dutch Reformed. In the 1840 United States census, 22 counties in the Wisconsin Territory reported the following population counts:

Rank	County	Population
1	Milwaukee	5,605
2	Iowa	3,978
3	Grant	3,926
4	Racine	3,475
5	Walworth	2,611
6	Brown	2,107
7	Rock	1,701
8	Portage	1,623
9	Crawford	1,502
10	Green	933
11	Jefferson	914
12	St. Croix	809
13	Washington	343
14	Dane	314
15	Calumet	275
16	Manitowoc	235
17	Fond du Lac	139
18	Winnebago	135
19	Sheboygan	133
20	Sauk	102
21	Dodge	67
22	Marquette	18
	Wisconsin Territory	30,945

== History ==
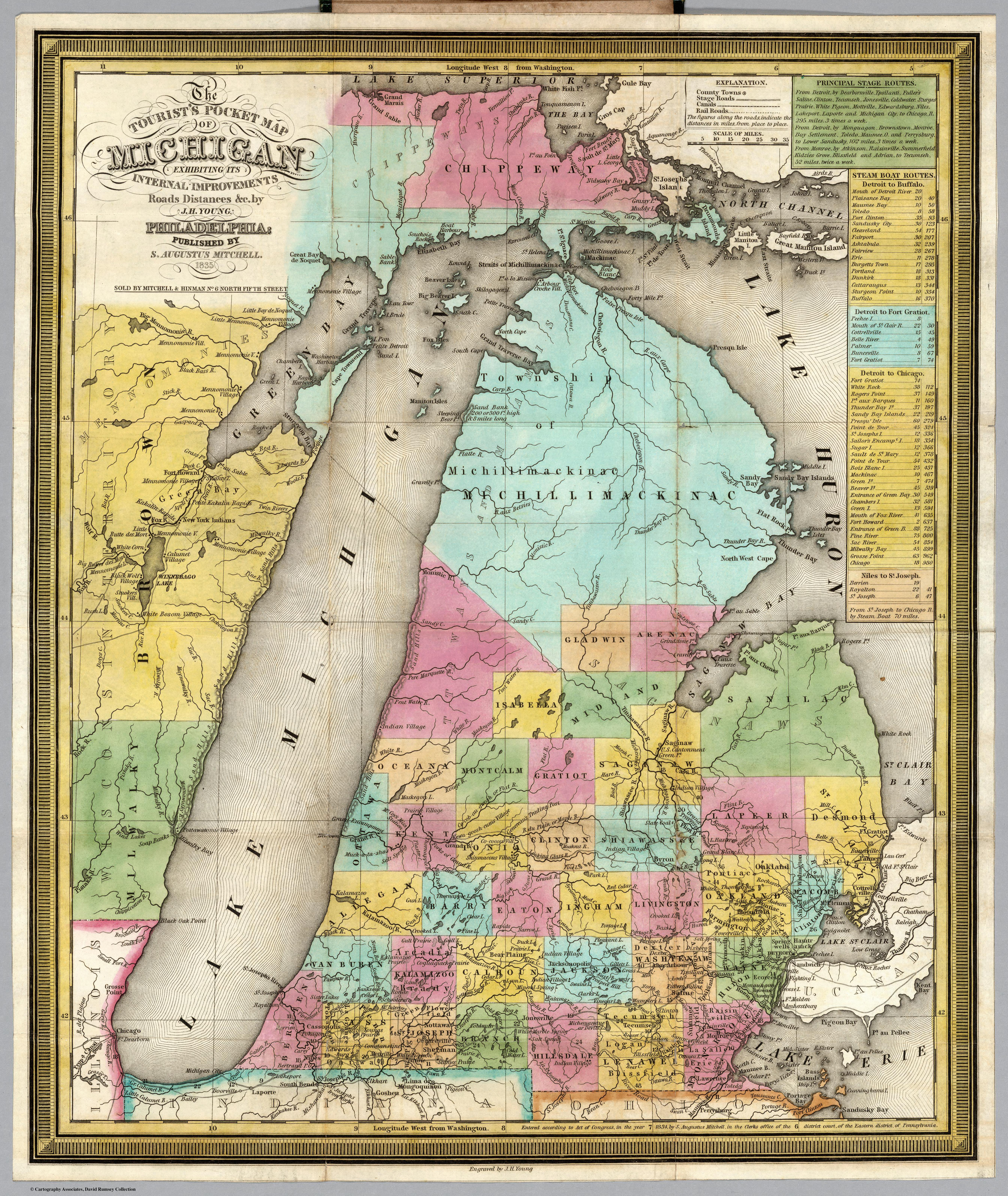
The Wisconsin Territory as depicted on this 1835 Tourist's Pocket Map of Michigan, showing a Menominee-filled Brown County, Wisconsin that spans the northern half of the territory

There are irregularities in the historical timeline at the outset of the Territory. After Congress refused Michigan's petition for statehood, despite meeting the requirements specified in the Northwest Ordinance, the people of Michigan authorized its constitution in October 1835 and began self-governance at that time. Yet, Michigan did not enter the Union until January 26, 1837, and Congress did not organize the Wisconsin Territory separately from Michigan until July 3, 1836.

Hoping to provide for some continuity in governance during that interim, acting Governor of the Michigan Territory, Stevens T. Mason, issued a proclamation on August 25, 1835, that called for the election of a western legislative council (the Seventh Michigan Territorial Council), which became known as the Rump Council. This council was to meet in Green Bay, Wisconsin, on January 1, 1836. However, because of the controversy between Michigan and Ohio over the Toledo Strip, known as the Toledo War, President Jackson removed Mason from office on August 15, 1835, and replaced him with John S. Horner. Horner issued his own proclamation on November 9, 1835, calling for the council to meet on December 1, 1835—giving delegates less than a month to learn of the change and travel to the meeting. This caused considerable annoyance among the delegates, who ignored it. Even Horner himself neglected to attend. The Council convened on January 1 as previously scheduled, but Horner, while reportedly intending to attend, was delayed by illness and in the Governor's absence the council could do little more than perform some administrative and ceremonial duties. For its concession to the Toledo Strip, Michigan was given the Upper Peninsula.

President Andrew Jackson appointed Henry Dodge Governor and Horner Secretary. The first legislative assembly of the new territory was convened by Governor Dodge at Belmont, in the present Lafayette County, on October 25, 1836. In 1837, Burlington, Iowa, became the second territorial capital of the Wisconsin Territory. The next year, the Iowa Territory was created and the capital was moved to Madison.

=== Wisconsin Enabling Act ===
In 1846, Congress approved the Wisconsin Enabling Act, which was the first step on the road to statehood for Wisconsin. Wisconsin would become the fifth state created out of the old Northwest Territory. Representing the expressed intent of the Wisconsin territorial legislature, Morgan Lewis Martin, Wisconsin's territorial delegate to Congress, initially argued that the proposed state should incorporate all remaining land in the original Northwest Territory as defined by the Northwest Ordinance of 1787.

Most members of Congress believed that such a state would be too large. They eventually accepted the argument of Stephen A. Douglas of Illinois, chairman of the House Committee on Territories, that Congress was not bound by the Northwest Ordinance, and passed legislation allowing a sixth state to be formed from the remnant of the Northwest Territory excluded from the new state of Wisconsin. However, subsequent bills in 1847 and 1848 to organize a new "Territory of Minasota" were rejected on the grounds that "Minasota" did not have anywhere near the 5,000 free adult males required for legal territorial status.

=== Wisconsin Territory after Wisconsin became a state ===
When Wisconsin became a state on May 29, 1848, no provision was made for the section of land between the St. Croix River and the Mississippi River which had previously been organized as part of Wisconsin Territory. Additionally when Iowa became a state on December 28, 1846, no provision was made for official organization of the remainder of what had been Iowa Territory.

In the summer of 1848, residents in the area organized themselves and called a series of meetings. As these meetings commenced, the most recent territorial delegate to congress John H. Tweedy officially tendered his resignation, thus vacating the seat. Secretary of State John Catlin went to Stillwater, Minnesota, and in the capacity of acting governor of the territory issued writs for a special election to fill the seat, which was won by Henry H. Sibley on October 30.

When Sibley went to Washington to take his seat in Congress, he was not immediately recognized. Only after a long political battle was he allowed to take his seat on January 15, 1849. For a period of time, there were simultaneously representatives in Congress from both the State of Wisconsin and the Territory of Wisconsin, an unprecedented situation. Sibley made it his first order of business to push through the statute necessary to establish the Territory of Minnesota, which occurred on March 3, 1849.

== Secretaries of Wisconsin Territory ==
- John S. Horner 1836–1837
- William B. Slaughter 1837–1841
- Francis J. Dunn 1841
- Alexander P. Field 1841–1843
- George Rogers Clark Floyd 1843–1846
- John Catlin 1846–1848

== Legislature ==
The Legislative Assembly of the Wisconsin Territory consisted of a council (equivalent to a senate) and representatives. The first session of the First Legislative Assembly convened at Belmont, Iowa County (now in Lafayette County), on October 25, and adjourned December 9, 1836. The Council at that time had 14 seats, and was presided over by Henry Baird of Brown County. There were 26 representatives; the Speaker of the House was Peter H. Engle of Dubuque County ("Dubuque County" at this time embraced all of the territory west of the Mississippi River and north of the latitude of the south end of Rock Island).

The last session of the assembly was the second session of the Fifth Legislative Assembly, which convened February 7, and adjourned March 13, 1848. The president of the 13-member council was Horatio N. Wells of Milwaukee, and the speaker of the 26-member House of Representatives was Timothy Burns of Iowa County.

== Attorneys general of Wisconsin Territory ==
- Henry S. Baird 1836–1839
- Horatio N. Wells 1839–1841
- Mortimer M. Jackson 1841–1845
- William Pitt Lynde 1845
- A. Hyatt Smith 1845–1848

== Congressional delegates ==
See also Wisconsin Territory's at-large congressional district

- George Wallace Jones 1836–1838 24th Congress, 25th Congress
- James Duane Doty 1839–1841 25th Congress, 26th Congress
- Henry Dodge 1841–1845 27th Congress, 28th Congress
- Morgan Lewis Martin 1845–1847 29th Congress
- John Hubbard Tweedy 1847–1848 30th Congress
- Henry Hastings Sibley 1848–1849 30th Congress

== See also ==
- Burlington Hawkeye
- James Clarke (Iowa politician)
- Governors of the Territory of Wisconsin
- Historic regions of the United States
- History of Wisconsin
- Territorial evolution of the United States
