= Fred R. Zimmerman =

American politician (1880–1954)

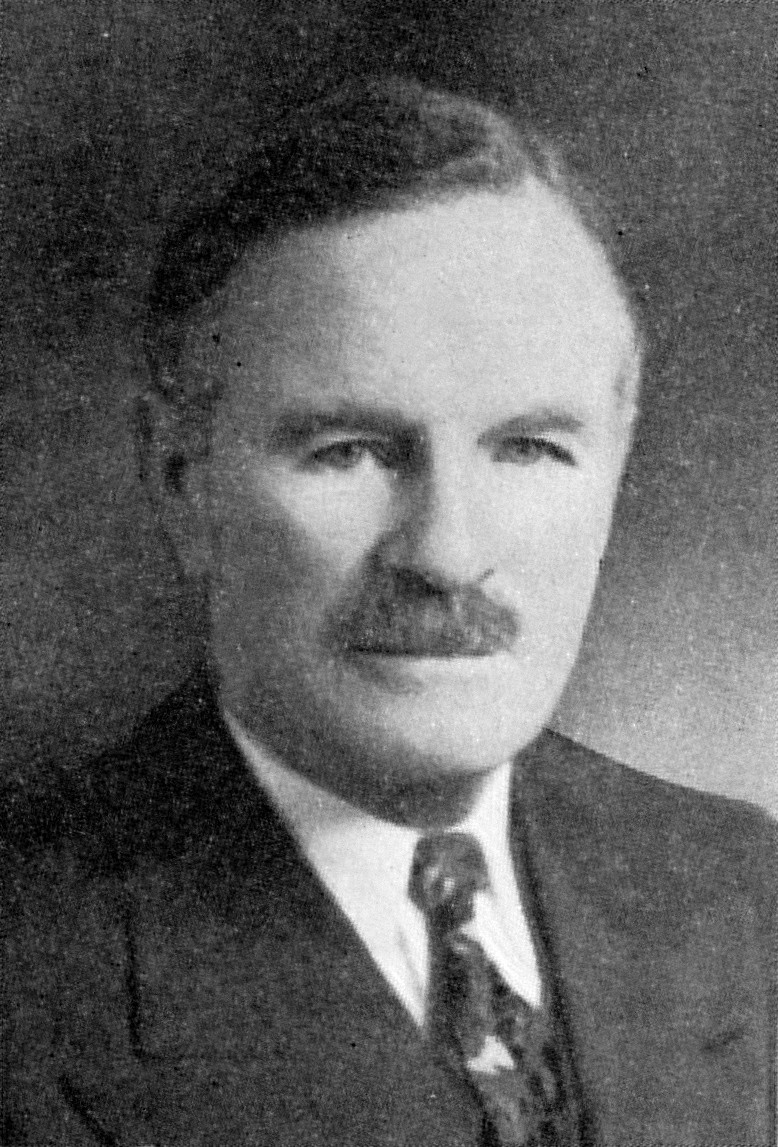

25th Governor of Wisconsin
- In office January 3, 1927 – January 7, 1929
- Lieutenant: Henry A. Huber
- Preceded by: John J. Blaine
- Succeeded by: Walter J. Kohler Sr.

22nd & 24th Secretary of State of Wisconsin
- In office January 2, 1939 – December 14, 1954
- Governor: Julius Heil; Walter Goodland; Oscar Rennebohm; Walter Kohler Jr.
- Preceded by: Theodore Dammann
- Succeeded by: Louis Allis
- In office January 1, 1923 – January 3, 1927
- Governor: John J. Blaine
- Preceded by: Elmer S. Hall
- Succeeded by: Theodore Dammann

Member of the Wisconsin State Assembly from the Milwaukee 8th district
- In office January 1, 1909 – January 1, 1911
- Preceded by: Simon Kander
- Succeeded by: James H. Vint

Personal details
- Born: Frederick Rudolph Zimmerman; November 20, 1880 Milwaukee, Wisconsin, U.S.
- Died: December 14, 1954 (aged 74) Milwaukee, Wisconsin, U.S.
- Resting place: Forest Home Cemetery, Milwaukee
- Party: Republican
- Spouse: Amanda Freedy (m. 1904–1954)
- Children: Robert Charles Zimmerman^{(b. 1910; died 1996)}; Frederick Underwood Zimmerman^{(b. 1916; died 2011)}

Frederick Rudolph Zimmerman (Note: Primary sources of his birth records and WWI draft registration, verified by date of birth, location, and parents' names, give his middle name as "Rudolph".) (November 20, 1880 – December 14, 1954) was a German American public administrator and Republican politician from Milwaukee, Wisconsin. He served as the 25th governor of Wisconsin (1927–1929), but was defeated in the 1928 Republican primary, trying to straddle both sides in the decades-long intra-party struggle between progressive and stalwart Republicans. Before and after serving as governor, Zimmerman also served as Wisconsin Secretary of State—serving a total of eighteen years in that office (1923–1927; 1939–1954). He also served one term in the Wisconsin State Assembly.

His son, Robert C. Zimmerman, also served as Wisconsin Secretary of State from 1957 until 1975.

== Background and early career ==
Zimmerman was born in Milwaukee, son of Charles E. Zimmerman and Augusta Fiesenhauser Zimmerman. He was a grandson of German-American Forty-Eighters. His father was born in New York state and came to Milwaukee in 1875. His mother was born in Wisconsin of parents who were natives of Stuttgart. Zimmerman's father, a molder, died when he was 5 and at an early age he began contributing to the support of his family by selling newspapers. After completing grammar school, he attended night school briefly, and held various jobs until he was 22, when he started the Bee Hive Dairy, distributing milk to Milwaukee residents. He left this job, after his marriage, to take a position as a traveling salesman with the Pfister & Vogel Leather Company, and also worked as a bookkeeper for a Milwaukee lumber firm.

== Elective office ==
=== Legislature ===
Zimmerman was elected to the Wisconsin State Assembly by six votes in 1908 in a three-way race, receiving 1703 votes on the Republican ticket to 1697 for Democrat Harry R. McLogan, and 1159 for Socialist Gilbert H. Poor, to represent the 8th Milwaukee County district (8th and 23d wards of the City of Milwaukee). He was an active member of the Progressive faction of his party, but served only one term (1909–1910), losing the 1910 election in a four-way contest to Socialist James H. Vint with 1521 votes, to 1501 for Zimmerman, 143 for McLogan, and 12 for Prohibitionist William H. Trout.

=== Secretary of State ===
In 1922, Zimmerman (by then an industrial relations manager for Nash Motors) had moved to the Town of Lake and served two years on the Town Board. He received the Republican nomination and election as Wisconsin Secretary of State in 1922 (with 77.7% of the vote in a four-way race) and re-election in 1924 in a five-way race, earning a then-record 509,771 votes statewide. During this period he remained closely identified with the Progressive faction of the Republican Party.

=== Governor ===
When the Progressives refused to endorse him in the gubernatorial election in 1926 (because of his failure to support the 1924 presidential candidacy of Robert M. La Follette Sr.), Zimmerman ran in the Republican primary election as an "independent" against both Progressive (Herman Ekern) and Stalwart (Charles B. Perry) candidates, as well as another "independent". Zimmerman won the Republican nomination and was elected by an absolute majority, outpolling Perry (who came in second, running as an independent), as well as the Democratic, Socialist, Prohibitionist and Socialist Labor candidates combined, with 350,927 votes out of 552,921. In 1928 he was defeated for re-nomination, running a poor third to Stalwart Walter J. Kohler Sr., and Progressive Congressman Joseph D. Beck.

Thereafter he went into a political decline for several years, briefly holding a position in the Beverage Tax Commission in 1936.

=== Secretary of State once more ===
Zimmerman was nominated and elected Secretary of State on the Republican ticket in 1938 and served until his death, polling a larger vote at each subsequent election and in 1952 again received the highest total ever given any candidate for any office in the state.

== Private life ==
Zimmerman was a delegate to the Republican National Conventions in 1916, 1920, 1924, 1940, and 1944. He was attacked as a member of America First, but he denied membership therein, although he generally followed isolationist positions. He died in Milwaukee in 1954 just after again winning re-election as Secretary of State.

== Electoral history ==
=== Wisconsin Assembly (1908, 1910) ===
Year	Election	Date	Elected				Defeated				Total	Plurality
1908	General	Nov. 3	Fred R. Zimmerman	Republican	1,703	37.35%	Harry R. McLogan	Dem.	1,697	37.22%	4,559	6
1908	General	Nov. 3	Fred R. Zimmerman	Republican	1,703	37.35%	Gilbert H. Poor	Soc.D.	1,159	25.42%	4,559	6
1910	General	Nov. 8	James H. Vint	Social Dem.	1,521	47.88%	Fred R. Zimmerman (inc)	Rep.	1,501	47.25%	3,177	20
1910	General	Nov. 8	James H. Vint	Social Dem.	1,521	47.88%	Harry R. McLogan	Dem.	143	4.50%	3,177	20
1910	General	Nov. 8	James H. Vint	Social Dem.	1,521	47.88%	William H. Trout	Proh.	12	0.38%	3,177	20

=== Wisconsin Secretary of State (1922, 1924) ===
Year	Election	Date	Elected				Defeated				Total	Plurality
1922	Primary	Sep. 5	Fred R. Zimmerman	Republican	282,913	62.47%	Martin R. Paulson	Rep.	169,984	37.53%	452,897	112,929
1922	General	Nov. 7	Fred R. Zimmerman	Republican	353,596	77.71%	Mathilda Boorman	Soc.	41,975	9.22%	455,046	311,621
1922	General	Nov. 7	Fred R. Zimmerman	Republican	353,596	77.71%	Peter S. Brzonkala	Ind.D.	40,388	8.88%	455,046	311,621
1922	General	Nov. 7	Fred R. Zimmerman	Republican	353,596	77.71%	Maria I. A. Nelsen	Proh.	19,000	4.18%	455,046	311,621
1924	Primary	Sep. 2	Fred R. Zimmerman (inc)	Republican	226,476	58.55%	Theodore Dammann	Rep.	70,379	18.19%	386,835	156,097
1924	Primary	Sep. 2	Fred R. Zimmerman (inc)	Republican	226,476	58.55%	Francis E. Davidson	Rep.	45,605	11.79%	386,835	156,097
1924	Primary	Sep. 2	Fred R. Zimmerman (inc)	Republican	226,476	58.55%	Guy J. Johnson	Rep.	44,375	11.47%	386,835	156,097
1924	General	Nov. 4	Fred R. Zimmerman (inc)	Republican	509,771	68.04%	John M. Callahan	Dem.	174,769	23.33%	749,249	335,002
1924	General	Nov. 4	Fred R. Zimmerman (inc)	Republican	509,771	68.04%	Ida Fenske	Soc.	46,606	6.22%	749,249	335,002
1924	General	Nov. 4	Fred R. Zimmerman (inc)	Republican	509,771	68.04%	Richard Keoppel	S.Lab.	10,100	1.35%	749,249	335,002
1924	General	Nov. 4	Fred R. Zimmerman (inc)	Republican	509,771	68.04%	Oliver Needham	Proh.	7,962	1.06%	749,249	335,002

=== Wisconsin Governor (1926, 1928) ===
Year	Election	Date	Elected				Defeated				Total	Plurality
1926	Primary	Sep. 7	Fred R. Zimmerman	Republican	215,546	46.77%	Herman Ekern	Rep.	178,252	38.68%	460,842	37,294
1926	Primary	Sep. 7	Fred R. Zimmerman	Republican	215,546	46.77%	Charles B. Perry	Rep.	41,856	9.08%	460,842	37,294
1926	Primary	Sep. 7	Fred R. Zimmerman	Republican	215,546	46.77%	W. Stanley Smith	Rep.	25,188	5.47%	460,842	37,294
1926	General	Nov. 2	Fred R. Zimmerman	Republican	350,927	63.47%	Charles B. Perry	Ind.	76,507	13.84%	552,912	274,420
1926	General	Nov. 2	Fred R. Zimmerman	Republican	350,927	63.47%	Virgil H. Cady	Dem.	72,627	13.14%	552,912	274,420
1926	General	Nov. 2	Fred R. Zimmerman	Republican	350,927	63.47%	Herman O. Kent	Soc.	40,293	7.29%	552,912	274,420
1926	General	Nov. 2	Fred R. Zimmerman	Republican	350,927	63.47%	David W. Emerson	Proh.	7,333	1.33%	552,912	274,420
1926	General	Nov. 2	Fred R. Zimmerman	Republican	350,927	63.47%	Alex Gorden	S.Lab.	4,593	0.83%	552,912	274,420
1928	Primary	Sep. 4	Walter J. Kohler Sr.	Republican	224,421	43.66%	Joseph D. Beck	Rep.	203,359	39.56%	514,065	21,062
1928	Primary	Sep. 4	Walter J. Kohler Sr.	Republican	224,421	43.66%	Fred R. Zimmerman (inc)	Rep.	82,837	16.11%	514,065	21,062
1928	Primary	Sep. 4	Walter J. Kohler Sr.	Republican	224,421	43.66%	John E. Ferris	Rep.	3,448	0.67%	514,065	21,062

=== Wisconsin Secretary of State (1938–1954) ===
Year	Election	Date	Elected				Defeated				Total	Plurality
1938	Primary	Sep. 20	Fred R. Zimmerman	Republican	152,475	74.22%	John L. Wasson	Rep.	31,326	15.25%	205,423	121,149
1938	Primary	Sep. 20	Fred R. Zimmerman	Republican	152,475	74.22%	Lee I. Yorkson	Rep.	21,622	10.53%	205,423	121,149
1938	General	Nov. 8	Fred R. Zimmerman	Republican	421,044	44.79%	Theodore Dammann (inc)	Prog.	391,150	41.61%	939,986	29,894
1938	General	Nov. 8	Fred R. Zimmerman	Republican	421,044	44.79%	William R. Callahan	Dem.	120,221	12.79%	939,986	29,894
1938	General	Nov. 8	Fred R. Zimmerman	Republican	421,044	44.79%	Bernard Smerlinski	Union	6,185	0.66%	939,986	29,894
1938	General	Nov. 8	Fred R. Zimmerman	Republican	421,044	44.79%	John J. Stoltenberg	S.Lab.	1,380	0.15%	939,986	29,894
1940	Primary	Sep. 17	Fred R. Zimmerman (inc)	Republican	272,467	76.84%	Bernhard Gettelman	Rep.	82,100	23.16%	354,567	190,367
1940	General	Nov. 5	Fred R. Zimmerman (inc)	Republican	712,267	55.74%	Adolph W. Larsen	Prog.	332,505	26.02%	1,277,763	379,762
1940	General	Nov. 5	Fred R. Zimmerman (inc)	Republican	712,267	55.74%	Julius G. Seyfert	Dem.	230,433	18.03%	1,277,763	379,762
1940	General	Nov. 5	Fred R. Zimmerman (inc)	Republican	712,267	55.74%	Arthur Wepfer	S.Lab.	2,386	0.19%	1,277,763	379,762
1942	General	Nov. 3	Fred R. Zimmerman (inc)	Republican	434,979	58.01%	John H. Kaiser	Prog.	196,287	26.18%	749,861	238,692
1942	General	Nov. 3	Fred R. Zimmerman (inc)	Republican	434,979	58.01%	Julius G. Seyfert	Dem.	107,535	14.34%	749,861	238,692
1942	General	Nov. 3	Fred R. Zimmerman (inc)	Republican	434,979	58.01%	John O. Van Hazinga	Soc.	9,434	1.26%	749,861	238,692
1942	General	Nov. 3	Fred R. Zimmerman (inc)	Republican	434,979	58.01%	John Stoltenberg	S.Lab.	1,290	0.17%	749,861	238,692
1944	General	Nov. 7	Fred R. Zimmerman (inc)	Republican	776,430	63.38%	Jack E. Joyce Jr.	Dem.	421,944	34.44%	1,225,061	354,486
1944	General	Nov. 7	Fred R. Zimmerman (inc)	Republican	776,430	63.38%	William J. Kirst	Soc.	13,898	1.13%	1,225,061	354,486
1944	General	Nov. 7	Fred R. Zimmerman (inc)	Republican	776,430	63.38%	Adelaide Woelfel	Ind.	12,681	1.04%	1,225,061	354,486
1946	General	Nov. 5	Fred R. Zimmerman (inc)	Republican	681,659	68.04%	John H. Kaiser	Dem.	307,591	30.70%	1,001,921	374,068
1946	General	Nov. 5	Fred R. Zimmerman (inc)	Republican	681,659	68.04%	William J. Kirst	Soc.	12,580	1.26%	1,001,921	374,068
1948	Primary	Sep. 21	Fred R. Zimmerman (inc)	Republican	329,018	73.62%	William H. Markham	Rep.	78,630	17.59%	446,937	250,388
1948	Primary	Sep. 21	Fred R. Zimmerman (inc)	Republican	329,018	73.62%	Andrew J. Rockne	Rep.	39,289	8.79%	446,937	250,388
1948	General	Nov. 2	Fred R. Zimmerman (inc)	Republican	705,040	57.32%	Erle J. Stoneman	Dem.	500,589	40.70%	1,229,960	204,451
1948	General	Nov. 2	Fred R. Zimmerman (inc)	Republican	705,040	57.32%	George C. Warnecke	Prog.	12,777	1.04%	1,229,960	204,451
1948	General	Nov. 2	Fred R. Zimmerman (inc)	Republican	705,040	57.32%	Walter G. Benson	Soc.	11,548	0.94%	1,229,960	204,451
1950	General	Nov. 7	Fred R. Zimmerman (inc)	Republican	689,356	62.36%	Nels M. Justeson	Dem.	408,790	36.98%	1,105,515	280,566
1950	General	Nov. 7	Fred R. Zimmerman (inc)	Republican	689,356	62.36%	Linton Jahr	Prog.	3,705	0.34%	1,105,515	280,566
1950	General	Nov. 7	Fred R. Zimmerman (inc)	Republican	689,356	62.36%	Fred Dahir	Soc.	3,658	0.33%	1,105,515	280,566
1952	Primary	Sep. 9	Fred R. Zimmerman (inc)	Republican	483,505	66.06%	Maurice Wigderson	Rep.	230,528	32.29%	714,033	252,977
1952	General	Nov. 4	Fred R. Zimmerman (inc)	Republican	1,039,317	66.06%	Herman Jessen	Dem.	534,017	33.94%	1,573,395	505,300
1954	Primary	Sep. 14	Fred R. Zimmerman (inc)	Republican	208,579	58.60%	Joyce M. Larkin	Rep.	147,341	41.40%	355,920	61,238
1954	General	Nov. 2	Fred R. Zimmerman (inc)	Republican	631,034	55.65%	Marguerite R. Benson	Dem.	502,910	44.35%	1,133,944	128,124

=== Wisconsin Supreme Court (1945) ===
Year	Election	Date	Elected				Defeated				Total	Plurality
1945	General	Apr. 3	Elmer E. Barlow (inc)	Nonpartisan	220,145	57.75%	Fred R. Zimmerman	Non.	138,756	36.40%	381,192	81,389
1945	General	Apr. 3	Elmer E. Barlow (inc)	Nonpartisan	220,145	57.75%	Peter F. Leuch	Non.	22,271	5.84%	381,192	81,389

== Notes ==
Political offices
Preceded by Elmer Hall	Secretary of State of Wisconsin; 1923 – 1927	Succeeded by Theodore Dammann
Preceded by John J. Blaine	Governor of Wisconsin; 1927 – 1929	Succeeded by Walter J. Kohler Sr.
Preceded by Theodore Dammann	Secretary of State of Wisconsin; 1939 – 1954	Succeeded by Louis Allis
Party political offices
Preceded by Elmer Hall	Republican nominee for Secretary of State of Wisconsin; 1922, 1924	Succeeded by Theodore Dammann
Preceded by John J. Blaine	Republican nominee for Governor of Wisconsin; 1926	Succeeded by Walter J. Kohler Sr.
Preceded by Charles Hawks Jr.	Republican nominee for Secretary of State of Wisconsin; 1938, 1940, 1942, 1944, 1946, 1948, 1950, 1952, 1954	Succeeded by Robert C. Zimmerman
