= Secretary of State of Wisconsin =

Political officer of Wisconsin

- Great Seal of the State of Wisconsin

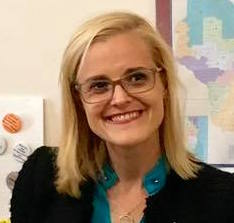
- Incumbent; Sarah Godlewski since March 17, 2023
- Style: Mister or Madam Secretary (informal); The Honorable (formal)
- Member of: Board of Commissioners of Public Lands
- Seat: Wisconsin State Capitol; Madison, Wisconsin
- Appointer: General election
- Term length: Four years, no term limits
- Constituting instrument: Wisconsin Constitution of 1848, Article VI
- Inaugural holder: Thomas McHugh
- Formation: June 7, 1848 (178 years ago)
- Succession: Second
- Salary: $72,551
- Website: Official page

The secretary of state of Wisconsin is a constitutional officer in the executive branch of the government of the U.S. state of Wisconsin, and is second (behind the lieutenant governor) in the line of succession to the office of governor of Wisconsin. Twenty-nine individuals have held the office of secretary of state, two of whom have held non-consecutive terms. The incumbent is Sarah Godlewski, who was appointed by Governor Tony Evers on March 17, 2023, to replace long-time Secretary of State Doug La Follette.

== Election and term of office ==
The secretary of state is elected on Election Day in November, and takes office on the first Monday of the next January. Originally, the secretary of state's term lasted for two years; since a 1967 amendment, however, the term has lasted four years. There is no limit to the number of terms a secretary of state may hold.

In the event of a vacancy in the office of the secretary of state, the governor may appoint a replacement to serve the balance of the term; this has occurred three times: upon the death of Fred R. Zimmerman, Louis Allis was appointed to fill the remainder of the term, Glenn Wise was appointed to fill the entire of the next term to which Zimmerman had been elected, and upon the retirement of Douglas La Follette, Sarah Godlewski was appointed to fill the remainder of the term, January 2027. She is now the third woman to hold the state office.

The secretary of state may be removed from office through an impeachment trial. They may also choose to resign from office. No secretary of state has ever been impeached. Only one secretary of state has resigned, when Douglas La Follette retired on March 17, 2023.

== Powers and duties ==
=== Chief clerk of state government ===
The secretary of state is charged by the state constitution with recording the official acts of the legislature and governor and making such records available for public inspection whenever required by either house of the Legislature. The state constitution likewise directs the secretary of state to keep the Great Seal and use it to authenticate the governor's official acts, other than bills signed into law. In this capacity as the chief clerk of state government, the secretary of state files, certifies, or issues an array of legally, commercially, and historically significant public records, including:

1. The original and enrolled laws and resolutions of the Legislature;
2. Executive orders, pardons, proclamations, extraditions, and commissions granted by the governor;
3. The official oaths and bonds of state legislators, judges, and the principal officers of state agencies, whether elected or appointed;
4. All political appointments made to each legislative, administrative and judicial agency;
5. All deeds, conveyances, abstracts of tile, options and leases of state lands;
6. The signatures and impressions of the official seal of the county clerks and registers of deeds in each of Wisconsin's 72 counties;
7. Apostilles and authentications of notarial acts and other official documents deposited in his or her office; and
8. Unless otherwise directed by law, all bonds, mortgages, and other securities, for money, for which the State of Wisconsin is a party.

=== Other responsibilities ===
Aside from these functional responsibilities, the secretary of state is an ex officio member of the Board of Commissioners of Public Lands. Moreover, the secretary of state is second in the order of succession to the office of governor; under the current terms of the constitution, if the governor dies, resigns or is removed from office and the office of the lieutenant governor is vacant, the secretary of state becomes governor, whereas in the vacancy of the office of lieutenant governor and the absence from the state, impeachment or inability to serve due to illness on the part of the governor, the secretary of state merely becomes acting governor. These terms came into effect with an amendment to the constitution in 1979; originally, in all of these events, the secretary of state simply became acting governor. While secretaries of state have at times briefly acted as governor, none has ever become governor, or acted as governor in circumstances that would have caused him or her to become governor had the 1979 amendment been in effect at the time.

== History of the office ==
The secretary of state's office has existed since before Wisconsin achieved statehood in 1848 and has a storied past. For most of Wisconsin's history, the secretary of state was one of the most powerful positions in state government, perhaps second only to the governor. In 1929 for example, the secretary of state registered businesses, issued driver's licenses, preserved important government records and, as Wisconsin's central elections officer, canvassed election returns, maintained voter records, regulated lobbyists, and enforced state election laws. In addition, prior to the passage of a 1946 constitutional amendment, the secretary of state served as ex officio state auditor. As the role of state auditor was understood at the time, the secretary of state acted as a comptroller, maintaining and settling state accounts, pre-auditing claims by and against the state, and issuing warrants on the state treasurer in payment of claims approved. Following passage of the constitutional amendment however, budgetary control and accounting of state spending was transferred to what is known today as the Department of Administration. At the same time, what is now known as the Legislative Audit Bureau was created to perform audits of state agencies and assist the Legislature in their oversight of government performance. Today, the secretary of state's counterpart in Oregon remains the only secretary of state in the nation to serve as state auditor. Later, 1973 Wisconsin Act 334 transferred the secretary of state's elections administration and ethics enforcement duties to two independent agencies now known as the Elections Commission and the Ethics Commission. Both commissions consist of six political appointees chosen by the governor and state lawmakers. After this reorganization, the secretary of state remained responsible for registering businesses, regulating lobbyists, and managing public records as the chief clerk of state government.

In 1978, Vel Phillips became the first African-American woman elected to statewide executive office in the United States, winning election as secretary of state of Wisconsin.

Since 1989, most of the secretary of state's duties have gradually been reassigned to other state agencies or outright eliminated. 1989 Wisconsin Act 338 transferred lobbying regulation to the Ethics Board, now known as the Ethics Commission. 1991 Wisconsin Act 39 transferred publication of the session laws to the Legislative Reference Bureau. 1995 Wisconsin Act 27 transferred corporations, charities and video franchise regulation, and the secretary of state's duties concerning Uniform Commercial Code, including the recording of tax liens and financing statements, to the Department of Financial Institutions. 2011 Wisconsin Act 32 transferred the commissioning of notaries public and trademark registration to the Department of Financial Institutions. 2013 Wisconsin Act 5 eliminated the secretary of state's power to designate the date of publication for each act of the legislature, largely in response to Secretary of State Doug La Follette's approach to the controversy surrounding 2011 Wisconsin Act 10. 2015 Wisconsin Act 55 transferred the secretary of state's municipal boundary review duties to the Department of Administration. The same act also eliminated the secretary of state's duty to publish slip laws and proposed constitutional amendments. As a result, the office of secretary of state in Wisconsin is institutionally the weakest directly elected member of the National Association of Secretaries of State, according to state-by-state analyses published by the Council of State Governments. Former Secretary La Follette advocated for years to return business registration and lobbying regulation back to his office, but the state legislature refused.

== See also ==
- List of secretaries of state of Wisconsin
- Wisconsin Board of Commissioners of Public Lands
