= Thomas Allen (Wisconsin politician) =

American publisher and politician (1825–1905)

Thomas S. Allen
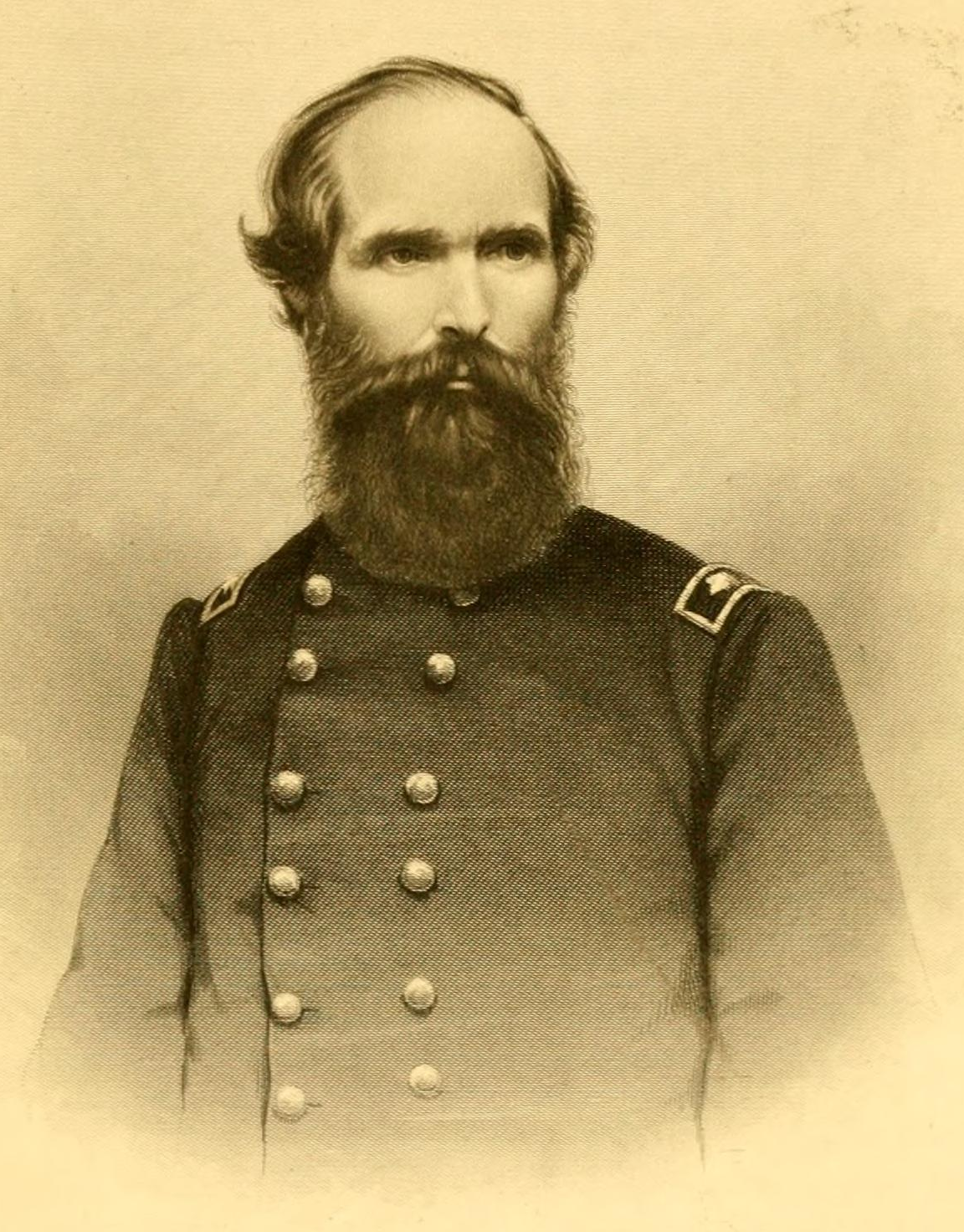
- Depicted in Quiner's Military History of Wisconsin (1866)

9th Secretary of State of Wisconsin
- In office January 1, 1866 – January 3, 1870
- Governor: Lucius Fairchild
- Preceded by: Lucius Fairchild
- Succeeded by: Llywelyn Breese

Member of the Wisconsin State Assembly from the Iowa 2nd district
- In office January 5, 1857 – January 4, 1858
- Preceded by: Richard M. Smith
- Succeeded by: Levi Sterling

Personal details
- Born: Thomas Scott Allen; July 26, 1825 Andover, New York, U.S.
- Died: December 12, 1905 (aged 80) Oshkosh, Wisconsin, U.S.
- Resting place: Riverside Cemetery, Oshkosh, Wisconsin
- Party: Republican
- Spouses: Natalia W. Weber; (died 1930)
- Children: Henry Asa Allen^{(b. 1867; died 1950)}; Alena K. Allen^{(b. 1869; 1892)}; Thomas Edward Allen^{(b. 1871; 1897)}; Georgia A. (West)^{(b. 1873; 1961)}; Emma Isabel Allen^{(b. 1874; 1897)}; Mary Allen Bishop^{(b. 1879; 1955)}
- Parents: Asa Smith Allen (father); Lydia (Kingsbury) Allen (mother)
- Profession: publisher, politician

Military service
- Allegiance: United States
- Branch/service: United States Army; Union Army
- Years of service: 1861–1865
- Rank: Colonel, USV; Brevet Brigadier General, USV
- Unit: Army of the Potomac
- Commands: Co. I, 2nd Reg. Wis. Vol. Infantry; 5th Reg. Wis. Vol. Infantry
- Battles/wars: See list: American Civil War; Manassas campaign; First Battle of Bull Run; Northern Virginia campaign; Second Battle of Bull Run; Maryland campaign; Battle of South Mountain; Battle of Antietam; Fredericksburg campaign; Battle of Fredericksburg; Gettysburg campaign; Battle of Gettysburg; Bristoe campaign; Second Battle of Rappahannock Station; Siege of Petersburg; Appomattox campaign; Third Battle of Petersburg

Thomas Scott Allen (July 26, 1825 – December 12, 1905) was an American printer, teacher, newspaper publisher, and politician. He served as the 9th Secretary of State of Wisconsin and served as a Union Army officer throughout the American Civil War, earning an honorary brevet rank of brigadier general. Before the war he also served a term in the Wisconsin State Assembly, representing Iowa County, and later in life he was publisher of the Oshkosh Northwestern newspaper.

== Early life ==
Thomas Scott Allen was born in Andover, New York, on July 26, 1825. He attended Oberlin College.

He served in the Wisconsin State Assembly in 1857, replacing Democrat Richard M. Smith in representing the new 2nd Iowa County district (Mineral Point, Mifflin, Linden and Waldwick). He was succeeded by fellow Republican Levi Sterling (Sterling, like Smith, was also from Mineral Point).

== Civil War service ==
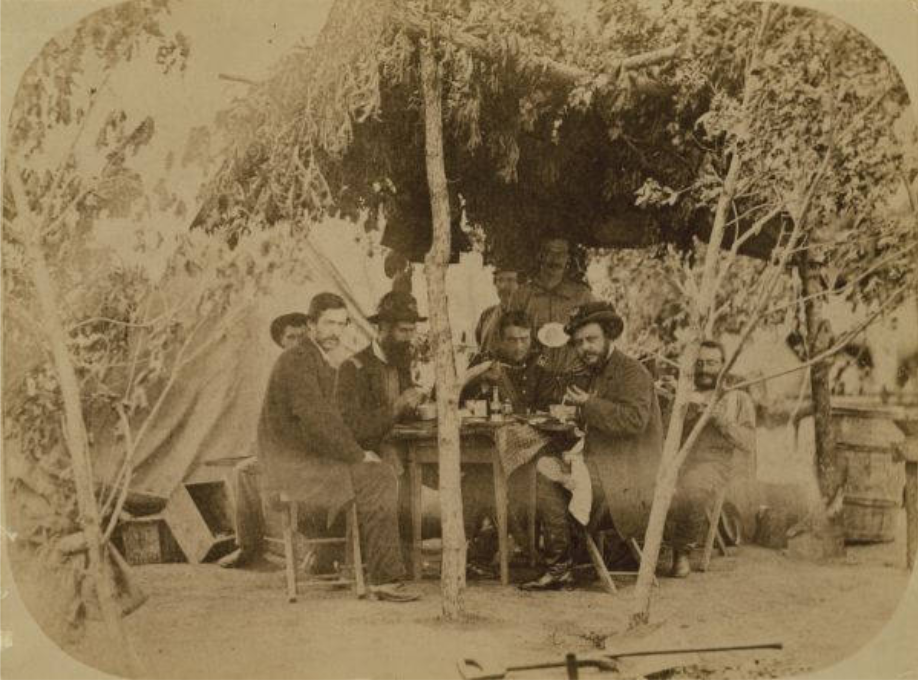
Field officers of the 2nd Wisconsin Vol. Infantry, photographed at a camp in northern Virginia circa 1862. The officers seated, from left, are surgeon A. J. Ward, Major Thomas S. Allen, Lt. Colonel Lucius Fairchild, and Colonel Edgar O'Connor.

=== Iron Brigade ===
At the outbreak of the American Civil War, Allen was one of the first Wisconsin volunteers to sign up for service in the Union Army. He helped organize a company of volunteers, known as the "Miners' Guards", and was elected captain. His company was then enrolled as Company I of the 2nd Wisconsin Infantry Regiment.

The regiment mustered into federal service in June 1861 and went east to Washington, D.C. Shortly after arriving, they were assigned to the brigade of William Tecumseh Sherman and went south into northern Virginia with the Manassas campaign on July 16. Within days, they were engaged at the disastrous First Battle of Bull Run. The 2nd Wisconsin Infantry was with Sherman's surprise attack on the Confederate right flank which briefly destabilized the Confederate line. After the Union retreat from Virginia, Allen was promoted to major, in place of Duncan McDonald, who resigned.

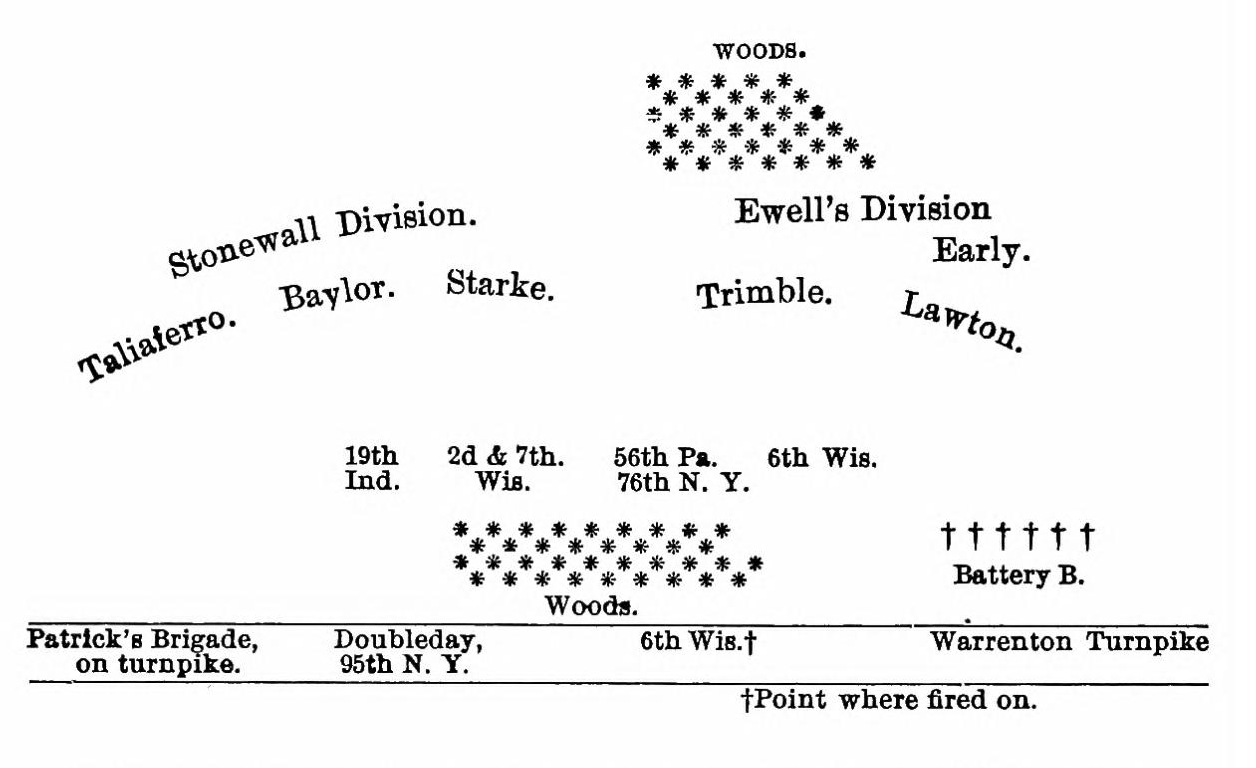
A sketch by Major Rufus Dawes of the location of forces at the Battle of Gainesville

The regiment was then reassigned to a new brigade under general Rufus King, along with the 6th Wisconsin Infantry, 7th Wisconsin Infantry, and 19th Indiana Infantry. The brigade would shortly become known as the Iron Brigade of the Army of the Potomac. With this brigade, Allen joined the second campaign into northern Virginia, culminating in the Second Battle of Bull Run. Their brigade was part of the initial engagement of that battle, which took place on the Warrenton Turnpike near Gainesville, Virginia. Sometimes referred to as the Battle of Gainesville, this is where the Iron Brigade first received its nickname as they withstood a combined assault from five brigades of Stonewall Jackson's Corps. The 2nd Wisconsin Infantry took the worst of the casualties. Nearly every officer of the regiment was killed or wounded; Allen was among the wounded but was able to return to duty within days. He was present with the brigade at the Battle of Antietam a month later, when he was wounded again.

=== 5th Wisconsin Infantry ===
In December 1862, Allen was promoted to colonel and assigned to take command of the 5th Wisconsin Infantry Regiment, to replace Amasa Cobb, who had been elected to Congress. He reported for duty and took command of the regiment on January 26, 1863.

He led the regiment at the Battle of Chancellorsville in the Spring of 1863, where he performed his most notable war service. He personally led five companies of his regiment to storm the position known as "Marye's Heights". Nicknamed the "slaughter pen", 5,000 Union men had died in the previous assault on the position during the Battle of Fredericksburg. It was a steep hill topped with fortifications, with neighboring hills capable of supporting the defense by strafing any assault from the sides.

Allen addressed his men to encourage them before the assault, saying:

Boys! You see those heights! You have got to take them! You think you cannot do it; but you can! You will do it! When the order 'Forward' is given, you will start at double quick—you will not fire a gun—you will not stop until you get the order to halt! You will never get that order!

— The Military History of Wisconsin (1866)

Allen led the assault through a barrage of bullets and chaff. As ordered, they ran up the hill without firing their weapons, then bayoneted men in their fortifications. They captured the heights, and accepted the surrender of the Washington Battery of New Orleans, with the enemy colonel complimenting Allen for his daring and the bravery of his men. The assault in the neighboring sector failed to secure their position, so Allen then led his men to assault that area from behind, capturing it. In all, Allen's assault captured nine cannons, over a hundred Confederate prisoners, and a comparable number of rifles, muskets, and other small arms.

Despite their gallant effort, the Battle of Chancellorsville was another disaster for the Union, and they were soon forced to abandon the heights and return to the north side of the Rappahannock River. Following Chancellorsville, the Confederate Army went on the offense into Union territory, on the campaign which culminated in the Battle of Gettysburg. The 5th Wisconsin Infantry, then part of VI Corps, arrived late on the second day of the battle and were largely held in reserve after they arrived.

Shortly after the battle, the 5th Wisconsin was ordered to go to New York City to assist with the draft riots. They were stationed in New York until October, when they returned to VI Corps in Virginia.

In November, the 5th Wisconsin was again selected for a special assault—along with the 6th Maine Infantry Regiment—when they were assigned to seize the Confederate outpost at the Second Battle of Rappahannock Station. Allen again led his men in a successful assault on the fortifications, but Allen was shot through the hand during the battle, rendering him unfit for duty. While recuperating, he returned to Wisconsin where he spoke at several events to support the Union cause and veterans charities. Around that same time, Allen re-enlisted as a veteran along with about 200 of his regiment. Their 200 veterans were not enough to qualify the regiment as a veteran regiment and remain in service, so the regiment would disband at the end of the enlistment term in August 1864.

Allen returned to Virginia with the regiment in March 1864, but his health remained somewhat delicate after his recent wound. Shortly after returning, he was assigned to a special commission in Washington, D.C., to examine officer candidates for the United States Colored Troops and he served there until the end of the original term of enlistment for the 5th Wisconsin Infantry.

=== 5th Wisconsin Infantry (Reorganized) ===
About the time of the expiration of the 5th Wisconsin Infantry, Allen decided he was well enough to return to service. Governor Lewis authorized the reorganization of the 5th Wisconsin Infantry in Wisconsin and reappointed Allen as colonel. Allen raised and organized seven new companies of volunteers and quickly marched them back to Virginia to integrate with the veteran remnant battalion of the old 5th Wisconsin. Upon rejoining VI Corps at the Siege of Petersburg, Allen was placed in command of a brigade.

In this role, Allen led one final assault of the war, charging the enemy's works at the Third Battle of Petersburg. The 5th Wisconsin Infantry was the first to enter the enemy's trenches, capturing several prisoners as the Confederates attempted to withdraw from the city. They then joined the pursuit of Lee's army in the Appomattox campaign, and were responsible for the capture of Lieutenant General Richard S. Ewell.

After Lee's capture, the regiment returned to Richmond, then mustered out on June 20, 1865. Allen was nominated for an honorary brevet to brigadier general on January 13, 1866, and his brevet was confirmed by the U.S. Senate on March 12, with an effective date of March 13, 1865.

== After the war ==
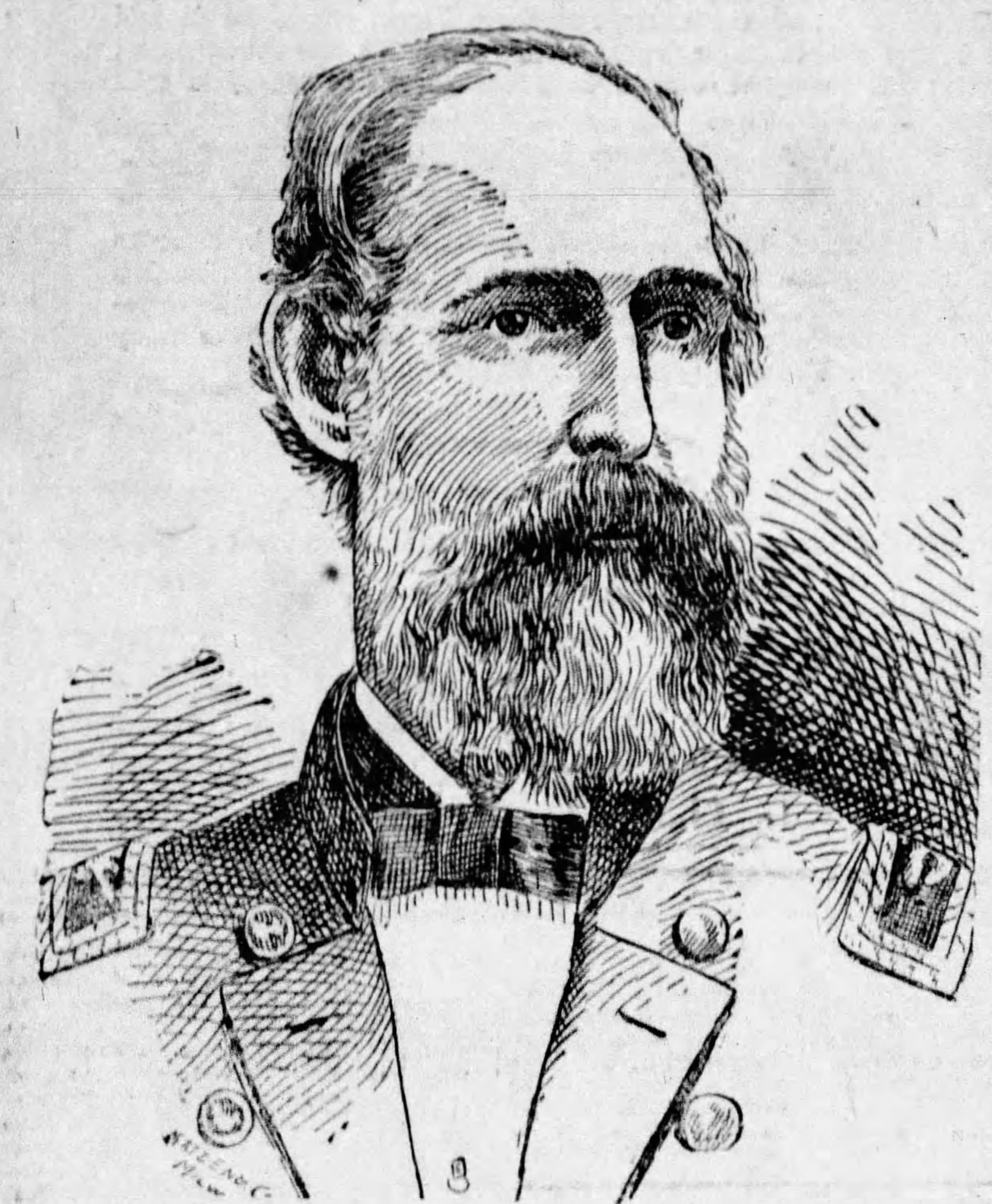
Depicted in the Oshkosh Northwestern after his death in 1905.

Allen was the Republican Party candidate for Secretary of State in the 1865 election, running alongside Republican gubernatorial candidate and fellow Iron Brigade veteran, Lucius Fairchild. Both Republicans won their elections and were subsequently re-elected in 1867. Allen served as the state's ninth Secretary of State, from January 1866 through January 1870.

After leaving office, he moved to Oshkosh, Wisconsin, and became the publisher of the Oshkosh Northwestern newspaper. He ran the Northwestern until 1884. He then published a German language paper, the Wisconsin Telegraph until 1902.

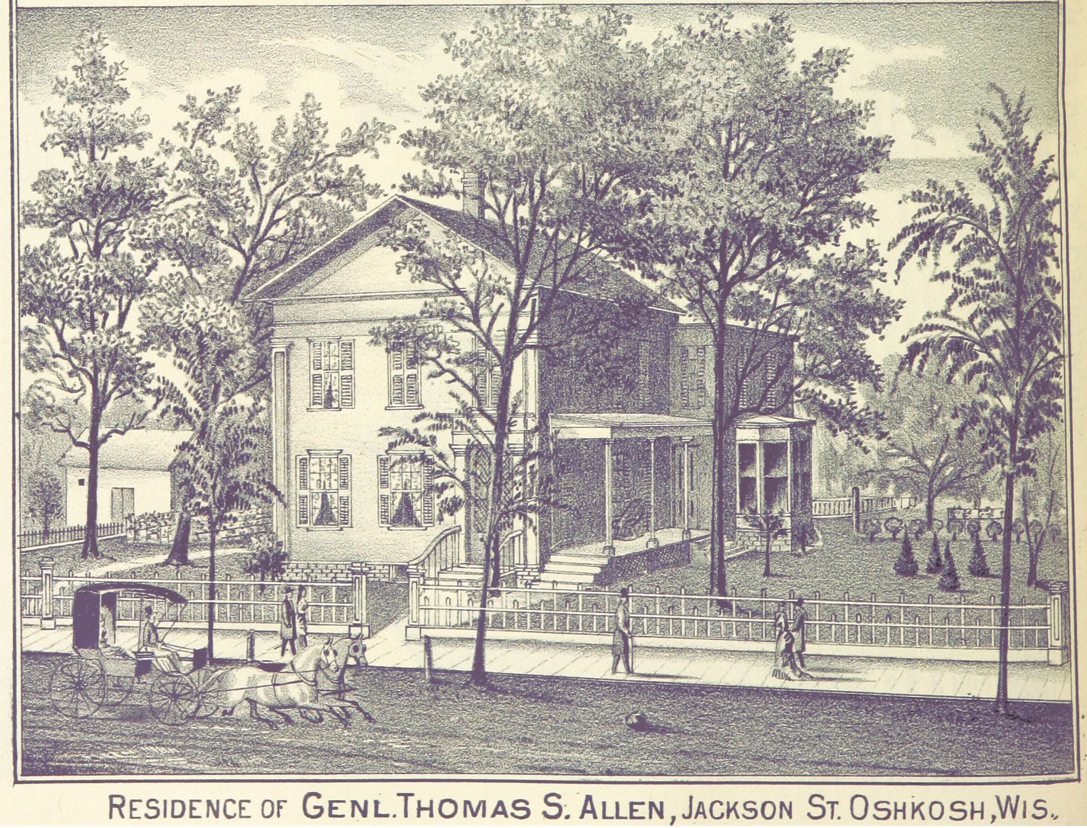
Allen's residence in Oshkosh

Allen died of heart failure at his home in Oshkosh on December 12, 1905. He was buried at Riverside Cemetery in Oshkosh.

Military offices
Preceded by Amasa Cobb	Command of the 5th Wisconsin Infantry Regiment; December 25, 1862 – August 20, 1865	Regiment abolished
Party political offices
Preceded by Lucius Fairchild	Republican nominee for Secretary of State of Wisconsin; 1865, 1867	Succeeded by Llywelyn Breese
Wisconsin State Assembly
Preceded by Richard M. Smith	Member of the Wisconsin State Assembly from the Iowa 2nd district January 5, 1857 – January 4, 1858	Succeeded by Levi Sterling
Political offices
Preceded by Lucius Fairchild	Secretary of State of Wisconsin; 1866–1870	Succeeded by Llywelyn Breese
