= Ephraim W. Young =

American politician (1821–1892)

County Judge of Sauk County, Wisconsin
- In office January 1, 1882 – March 25, 1892
- Preceded by: Giles Stevens
- Succeeded by: W. T. Kelsey

Chief Clerk of the Wisconsin State Assembly
- In office January 1, 1866 – January 5, 1874
- Preceded by: John S. Dean
- Succeeded by: George Wilbur Peck

Member of the Wisconsin State Assembly from the Sauk 1st district
- In office January 2, 1860 – January 7, 1861
- Preceded by: Nelson Wheeler
- Succeeded by: John Bear

Personal details
- Born: October 7, 1821 Bingham, Maine, U.S.
- Died: March 25, 1892 (aged 70) Baraboo, Wisconsin, U.S.
- Cause of death: Heart attack
- Resting place: Prairie du Sac Cemetery, Prairie du Sac, Wisconsin
- Party: Republican; Whig (before 1854)
- Spouse: Harriet Holbrook Bowers Norton (m. 1848–1892)
- Children: daughter^{(died at 20 months)}; Edward T. Young^{(b. 1853; died 1874)}
- Education: Harvard University
- Profession: Lawyer

Ephraim Wood Young (October 7, 1821 – March 25, 1892) was an American lawyer, Republican politician, and Wisconsin pioneer. He served one term in the Wisconsin State Assembly, representing Sauk County during the 1860 term. After his term as a representative in the Assembly, he served as assistant chief clerk for the next five terms, and then served as chief clerk of the Assembly from 1866 through 1873. He served the last ten years of his life as Sauk County probate judge. His name was sometimes abbreviated as E. W. Young.

== Biography ==
Ephraim Young was born October 7, 1821, in the town of Bingham, Maine. He attended Waterville College in Waterville, Maine, from 1844 to 1846, then went on to Harvard University, graduating in the class of 1848. After graduating, he worked for eight years as an educator in Lowell, Massachusetts. While working as a teacher, he also studied law in the office of Tappan Wentworth, and was admitted to the Massachusetts Bar in October of 1856.

That year, Young went west to the new state of Wisconsin and settled in the village of Prairie du Sac, in Sauk County, Wisconsin. Shortly after arriving, he became involved in politics with the Republican Party of Wisconsin, and in 1859 he was nominated for Wisconsin State Assembly in Sauk County's 1st Assembly district—then comprising the southern half of the county. Young won the election and went on to serve in the 13th Wisconsin Legislature. During the 1860 term, Young was appointed by Governor Alexander Randall to the board of trustees of the state Hospital for the Insane in Madison, Wisconsin; he would serve in that role continuously until 1874.

Young did not run for re-election in 1860, but immediately after the election he was mentioned as a candidate for chief clerk of the Assembly in the 14th Legislature, with the expectation that long-serving clerk L. H. D. Crane would retire. Crane ultimately served one final term as chief clerk, but Young was hired as bookkeeper for that term, under assistant chief clerk John S. Dean. The following term Crane retired, Dean became chief clerk, and Young became assistant chief clerk—they remained in those roles for four terms, until Dean's retirement at the end of the 1865 term. With the start of the 19th Wisconsin Legislature, Young became chief clerk of the Assembly, and went on to serve in that role for eight terms, from 1866 to 1874.

In early 1873, Young was discussed as a potential candidate for Secretary of State of Wisconsin. The 1873 Republican state convention was seen as a repudiation of the "Madison Regency" political machine of Elisha W. Keyes; all of the Regency's slate was defeated at the convention, Young was nominated for Secretary of State over incumbent Llywelyn Breese.

But the same factors that led to the overthrow of the Regency in the state convention also bolstered the Democratic statewide ticket, their ranks swelled by Liberal Republicans, Grangers, and other reformers in the short-lived Reform Coalition. Young lost the general election, as nearly the entire Republican ticket went down to defeat.

After Republicans regained the legislative majority, Young was frequently nominated as a candidate for chief clerk again, but was not re-elected.

In 1881, Young was nominated by the county Republican Party as their candidate for county judge in the spring election. He won the election and went on to serve the last ten years of his life in that role, working up until the day of his death.

Ephraim W. Young died of a sudden heart attack on March 25, 1892.

== Personal life and family ==
Ephraim W. Young married Harriet Holbrook Bowers Norton in 1848. They had two children together, but their daughter died in infancy and their son died in a horse-drawn carriage accident at age 20. Young's wife survived him.

== Electoral history ==
=== Wisconsin Secretary of State (1873) ===
Wisconsin Secretary of State Election, 1873
Party	Candidate	Votes	%	±%
General Election, November 4, 1873
Democratic	Peter Doyle	80,539	54.53%	+7.42pp
Republican	Ephraim W. Young	67,110	45.44%	−7.43pp
	Scattering	36	0.02%	
Plurality		13,429	9.09%	+3.34pp
Total votes		147,685	100.0%	+0.20%
Democratic gain from Republican				

Party political offices
Preceded by Llywelyn Breese	Republican nominee for Secretary of State of Wisconsin; 1873	Succeeded by Hans Warner
Wisconsin State Assembly
Preceded by Nelson Wheeler	Member of the Wisconsin State Assembly from the Sauk 1st district January 2, 1860 – January 7, 1861	Succeeded by John Bear
Preceded by John S. Dean	Chief Clerk of the Wisconsin State Assembly; January 1, 1866 – January 5, 1874	Succeeded by George Wilbur Peck
Legal offices
Preceded by Giles Stevens	County Judge of Sauk County, Wisconsin; January 1, 1882 – March 25, 1892	Succeeded by W. T. Kelsey
