= Senator Sterling (disambiguation) =

Thomas Sterling (1851–1930) was a U.S. Senator from South Dakota from 1913 to 1925. Senator Sterling may also refer to:

- Levi Sterling (1804–1868), Wisconsin State Senate
- Micah Sterling (1784–1844), New York State Senate
