= Mineral Point Hill =

- U.S. National Register of Historic Places
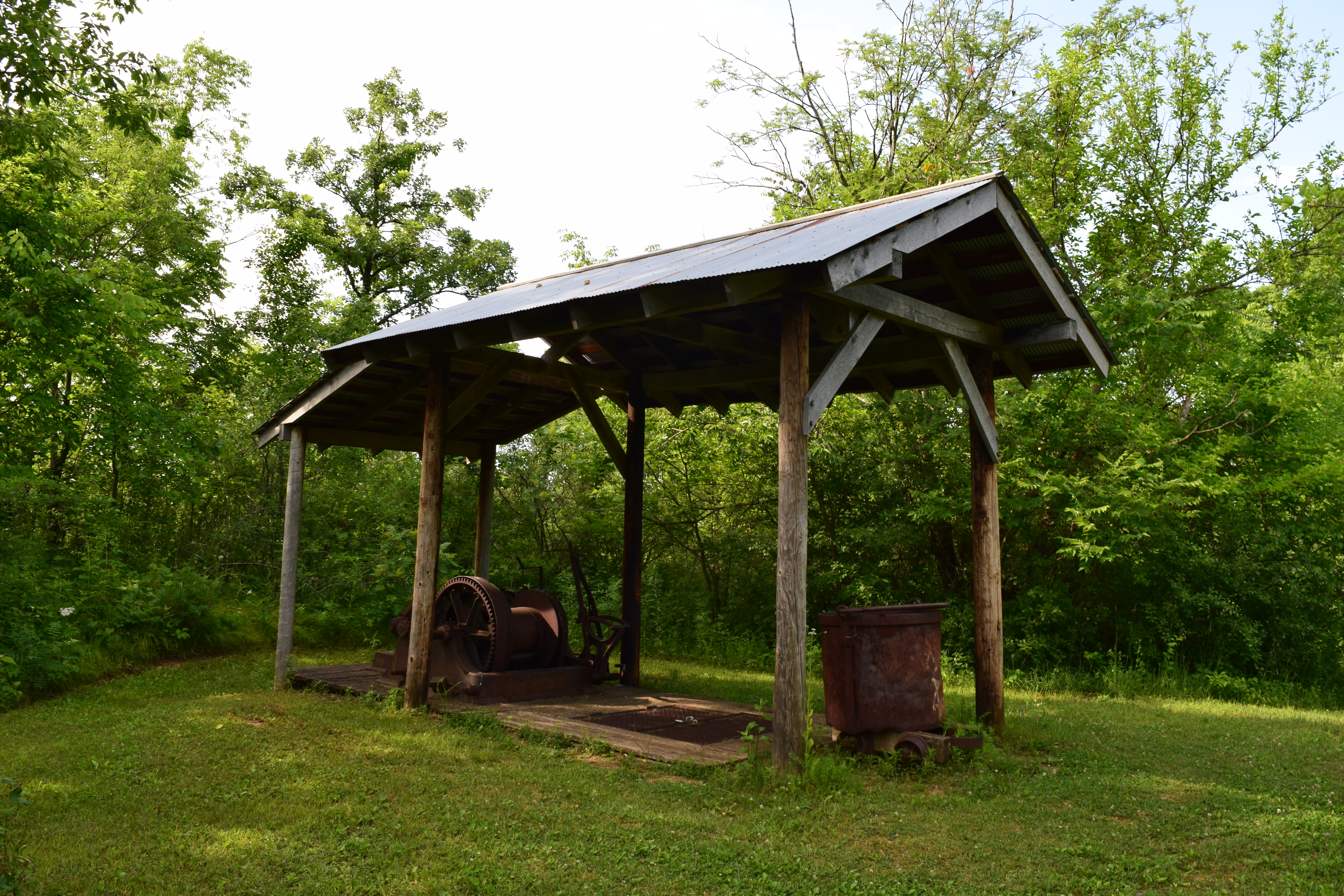

- Location within Wisconsin
- Location: Roughly bounded by WI 23, Copper, Dodge, and Shake Rag Sts., Mineral Point, Wisconsin
- Coordinates: 42°51′36″N 90°10′16″W
- Area: 50 acres (20 ha)
- NRHP reference No.: 72000054
- Added to NRHP: October 26, 1972

Mineral Point Hill is a hill and former mining site in Mineral Point, Wisconsin, bounded by Wisconsin Highway 23, Shake Rag Street, Copper Street, and Dodge Street. It is the site of the 1825 discovery of lead ore in Mineral Point, which drew settlers to the region over the next decade. Many of these new residents were Cornish immigrants, and they settled in a community called Pendarvis at the base of the hill. The wave of settlement led to Mineral Point's establishment in the 1830s, making it the third-oldest city in Wisconsin. The hill was also the site of the Merry Christmas zinc mine, which operated from 1906 to 1912; by this point, zinc had supplanted lead as the area's most plentiful resource. The site includes a mine office building, the shaft of the Merry Christmas mine, and several filled mine sites.

The hill was added to the National Register of Historic Places on October 26, 1972.
