= Richard M. Smith =

American politician (1828–1888)

Richard Moore Smith (October 1, 1828 – May 24, 1888) was an American politician from Mineral Point, Wisconsin who in 1856 spent a one-year term as a Democratic member of the Wisconsin State Assembly from Iowa County, Wisconsin.

Smith was born in Pennsylvania, the son of William Rudolph Smith, and moved with his parents to Mineral Point as a child in 1837. He served as Chairman of the Committee on Railways. He was succeeded by Republican Thomas Allen, also of Mineral Point. Smith moved to Quincy, Illinois in 1868, where he managed the savings department at Bull's Bank. He died in Quincy in 1888 and was buried in Mineral Point.
