= William Rudolph Smith =

19th-century American politician and pioneer (1787–1868)

William R. Smith
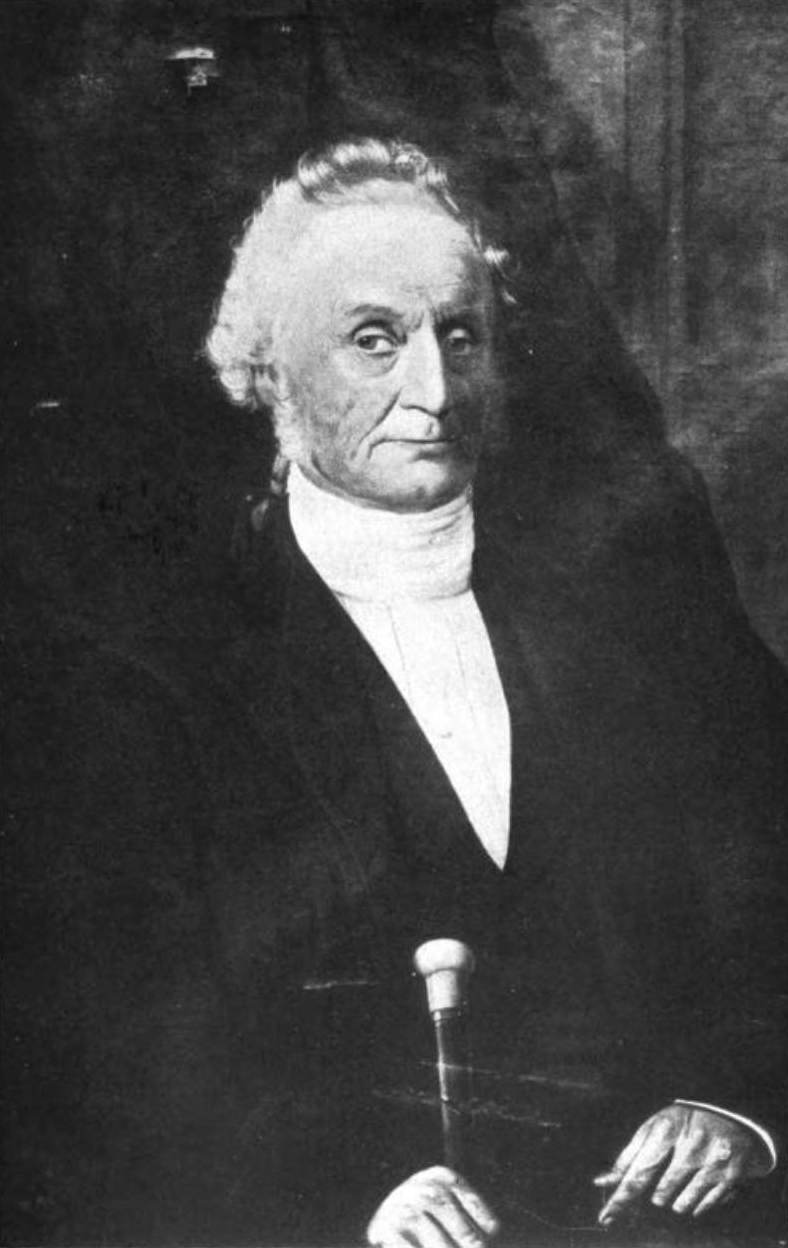

5th Attorney General of Wisconsin
- In office January 7, 1856 – January 4, 1858
- Governor: William A. Barstow; Arthur MacArthur Sr. Coles Bashford
- Preceded by: George Baldwin Smith
- Succeeded by: Gabriel Bouck

1st Adjutant General of Wisconsin
- In office May 29, 1848 – April 1, 1851
- Preceded by: Position established
- Succeeded by: William A. Barstow

Member of the Pennsylvania Senate from the 17th district
- In office December 2, 1823 – December 7, 1824
- Preceded by: William Davidson
- Succeeded by: Christian Garber

Member of the Pennsylvania House of Representatives from the Centre and Clearfield district
- In office December 7, 1819 – December 3, 1822
- Preceded by: Jacob Kryder
- Succeeded by: John Mitchell and Martin Hoover

Personal details
- Born: August 31, 1787 Trappe, Pennsylvania
- Died: August 22, 1868 (aged 80) Quincy, Illinois, U.S.
- Resting place: Graceland Cemetery; Mineral Point, Wisconsin
- Party: Democratic; Federalist (before 1836)
- Spouses: Eliza Anthony (m. 1809; died 1821); Mary Hamilton Van Dyke (m. 1823)
- Children: with Eliza Anthony; William Anthony Smith^{(b. 1809; died 1887)}; with Mary Van Dyke; Penelope C. "Nellie" (Henry)^{(b. 1830; died 1852)}; Richard Moore Smith^{(b. 1828; died 1888)}; John Montgomery Smith^{(b. 1834; died 1903)}; Maria Letitia Smith^{(b. 1836; died 1852)}
- Parents: William Moore Smith (father); Anne (Rudolph) Smith (mother)
- Profession: lawyer

Military service
- Allegiance: United States
- Branch/service: Pennsylvania Militia (1812–1815); Wisconsin Territorial Militia (1837–1848); Wisconsin Militia (1848–1852)
- Rank: Major General
- Commands: 62nd Pennsylvania Reserves
- Battles/wars: War of 1812

William Rudolph Smith (August 31, 1787 – August 22, 1868) was an American lawyer, politician, pioneer, and historian from Pennsylvania who served as the 5th Attorney General of Wisconsin, the first President of the Wisconsin Historical Society, and the first Adjutant General of Wisconsin.

Earlier, while living in Pennsylvania, he served as a Federalist member of the Pennsylvania House of Representatives and Senate, and served for many years in the Pennsylvania Militia, including service as Colonel of the 62nd Pennsylvania Reserves in the War of 1812.

== Early life ==
Smith was born on August 31, 1787, in Trappe, Pennsylvania. He moved with his father to Philadelphia in 1792 and was educated in a prestigious preparatory school there. In 1799, he entered Latin school, but soon his education was taken over by his paternal grandfather, Reverend William Smith—who had been the first provost of the College of Philadelphia. In 1803, his father, William Moore Smith, was appointed one of the commissioners to England to negotiate the ongoing adjustments and claims related to the "Jay Treaty" of 1795. The 16-year-old Smith was then employed by his father as a private secretary and accompanied him on his mission to the United Kingdom.

He returned to the United States in 1805 and studied law. In 1808, he was admitted to the Pennsylvania Bar and moved to Huntingdon, Pennsylvania—a town that had been laid out by his grandfather—where he started his legal practice. In 1811, he was appointed Deputy Attorney General for nearby Cambria County.

While living in Philadelphia as a young man, he became affiliated with the Philadelphia Light Horse. Throughout the years he became more active with the Pennsylvania Militia, and, at the outbreak of the War of 1812, he was appointed Colonel of the 62nd Pennsylvania Reserves. He led the regiment in support of the Erie Campaign and the Battle of Lundy's Lane; he was among the defenders at the Battle of Baltimore and witnessed the disastrous Battle of Bladensburg and the subsequent burning of Washington, D.C. He remained active with the Militia after the war, eventually rising to the rank of Major General.

== Pennsylvania career ==
He became more active in politics after the war, and, in 1819, was elected to a term in the Pennsylvania House of Representatives, for the district representing Centre and Clearfield counties. In 1823, he was elected to the Pennsylvania Senate to fill the last year of the term of William Davidson, who had resigned. His politics evolved after his senate term, where he had served as a member of the Federalist Party. He became a Jeffersonian democrat and, in 1836, was a presidential elector for Martin Van Buren in the presidential election. That same year, as he continued his legal career, he was admitted to the bar of the Supreme Court of the United States.

== Wisconsin career ==
On March 25, 1837, Smith was appointed commissioner for the United States, along with Wisconsin Territory Governor Henry Dodge, to negotiate with the Chippewa to purchase Ojibwe lands. He arrived too late; Dodge had already single-handedly wrested old growth pine and millsites in the future east central Minnesota and central Wisconsin from the assembled Ojibwe by a treaty negotiated at Fort Snelling in late July 1837. In 1838 Smith published his travel notes as Observations on the Wisconsin Territory: Chiefly on That Part Called the Wisconsin Land District: With a Map, Exhibiting the Settled Parts of the Territory. As laid off in Counties by Act of the Legislature in 1837.

Following the treaty, Smith remained in the Wisconsin Territory, and, in 1839, was appointed adjutant general of the Wisconsin Territorial militia. He retained this office by a vote of the Legislature after Wisconsin achieved statehood in 1848, relinquishing it in 1852 after nearly 13 years in command of the Wisconsin Militia. He also became heavily involved with the emerging Democratic Party in the Wisconsin Territory, presiding over the first convention of the party in the territory, in 1840, and drafted the address of the party to the people of the territory.

In 1846, Smith was hired as Clerk of the Legislative Council (the upper body of the territorial legislature) and, that same year, was elected as one of Iowa County's delegates to Wisconsin's first constitutional convention. He sat in the chair of the constitutional convention when it first convened until the convention was able to elect a president. The constitution produced by this convention was ultimately rejected by the voters and another attempt was made in 1848, which produced the Constitution of Wisconsin.

After Wisconsin achieved statehood, in the 2nd session of the Wisconsin State Senate (1849), the members elected Smith as Chief Clerk of the Senate. He was re-elected for another term in the 3rd Legislature (1850). In 1852, Smith was commissioned by the Legislature to compose a documentary history of Wisconsin and, at the creation of the Wisconsin Historical Society, Smith was appointed the first President of the organization. He ultimately produced two volumes of a planned three volume history.

In 1855, Smith was elected the 5th Attorney General of Wisconsin, in the first statewide elections after the creation of the Republican Party. Smith defeated Republican candidate Alexander Randall, who, two years later, would be elected Governor. Immediately after taking office, Smith was confronted by the controversy over the disputed results of the 1855 Wisconsin gubernatorial election—in which both Republican candidate, Coles Bashford, and Democratic candidate, William A. Barstow, claimed victory. Smith ultimately referred the matter to the Wisconsin Supreme Court on the information provided by Bashford that Barstow's majority relied on fraudulent returns. The Supreme Court ruled in favor of Bashford and he was ultimately installed as Governor.

After leaving office in 1857, Smith largely retired from public affairs.

== Personal life and family ==
Smith was married twice. His first wife, Eliza Anthony, was a granddaughter of Michael Hillegas, who had been the first Treasurer of the United States. Smith and Eliza Anthony were married March 17, 1809, and she died in 1821. In 1823, Smith married Mary Campbell Van Dyke, a niece of Congressman Thomas Jefferson Campbell of Tennessee.

With his first wife, Smith had at least one child:

- William Anthony Smith became a medical doctor and served as a surgeon in the Union Army during the American Civil War. Earlier in his life, he raised a company of militia known as the Cambria Guards who served in the Mexican American War.

With his second wife, Smith had at least four children:

- Penelope "Nellie" Smith married William T. Henry and moved to Sacramento, California, dying at age 22.
- Richard Moore Smith served one term in the Wisconsin State Assembly in 1856.
- John Montgomery Smith also served one term in the Wisconsin State Assembly, in 1892.
- Maria Letitia Smith died of a lung disease at age 16.

In addition to his political interests, Smith was active in the masonic organizations of Pennsylvania and Wisconsin and had served as Grand Master of both state organizations. He died on August 22, 1868, while visiting one of his daughters living in Quincy, Illinois. He was interred at Graceland Cemetery in Mineral Point. Sources indicate Smith had eight children still living at the time of his death.

== Electoral history ==
=== Wisconsin Attorney General (1855) ===
Wisconsin Attorney General Election, 1855
Party	Candidate	Votes	%	±%
General Election, November 6, 1855
Democratic	William R. Smith	37,312	51.22%	−5.81%
Republican	Alexander Randall	35,533	48.78%	
Plurality		1,779	2.44%	-12.00%
Total votes		72,845	100.0%	+31.03%
Democratic hold				

== Works ==
- Smith, William Rudolph (1854). The History of Wisconsin. Vol. 1, Historical. Madison, Wisconsin: Beriah Brown.
- Smith, William Rudolph (1854). The History of Wisconsin. Vol. 2, Documentary. Madison, Wisconsin: Beriah Brown.

Military offices
New state government	Adjutant General of Wisconsin; May 29, 1848 – April 1, 1851	Succeeded by William A. Barstow
Party political offices
Preceded by George Baldwin Smith	Democratic nominee for Attorney General of Wisconsin; 1855	Succeeded by Gabriel Bouck
Pennsylvania House of Representatives
Preceded by Jacob Kryder	Member of the Pennsylvania House of Representatives from the Centre and Clearfield district December 7, 1819 – December 3, 1822	Succeeded by John Mitchell and Martin Hoover
Pennsylvania State Senate
Preceded by William Davidson	Member of the Pennsylvania Senate from the 17th district December 2, 1823 – December 7, 1824	Succeeded by Christian Garber
Legal offices
Preceded by George Baldwin Smith	Attorney General of Wisconsin; January 7, 1856 – January 4, 1858	Succeeded by Gabriel Bouck
