= McAloney =

McAloney is a surname. Notable people with this surname include:

- Will McAloney (born 1993), Filipino-Canadian basketball player
- William McAloney (1910–1995), Australian engineering officer

== See also ==
- William Aloney Rust (1844–1903), American businessman and politician
