= Levi Sterling =

19th century Wisconsin pioneer (1804–1868)

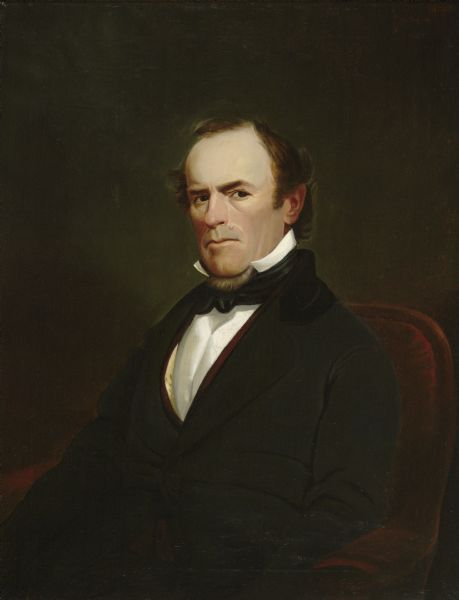
- Portrait by Samuel Marsden Brookes, ca. Nov. 1856

Sheriff of Iowa County, Wisconsin
- In office January 1, 1855 – January 5, 1857
- Preceded by: Charles N. Mumford
- Succeeded by: T. McFarland
- In office January 4, 1847 – January 6, 1851
- Succeeded by: R. S. Vivian

Member of the Wisconsin Senate
- In office January 3, 1853 – January 1, 1855
- Preceded by: Andrew Palmer
- Succeeded by: Amasa Cobb
- Constituency: 15th Senate district
- In office January 6, 1851 – January 3, 1853
- Preceded by: M. M. Cothren
- Succeeded by: Edward M. Hunter
- Constituency: 5th Senate district

Member of the Wisconsin State Assembly from the Iowa 2nd district
- In office January 4, 1858 – January 3, 1859
- Preceded by: Thomas S. Allen
- Succeeded by: John Toay

Member of the Council of the Wisconsin Territory from Iowa County
- In office November 5, 1838 – November 1, 1841 Serving with James Collins
- Preceded by: Ebenezer Brigham, John B. Terry, & James R. Vineyard
- Succeeded by: James Collins & Moses M. Strong

Personal details
- Born: January 2, 1804 Woodford County, Kentucky, U.S.
- Died: October 16, 1868 (aged 64) Mineral Point, Wisconsin, U.S.
- Resting place: Graceland Cemetery, Mineral Point, Wisconsin (re-interred)
- Party: Republican; Whig (before 1854)
- Spouse: Nancy Parish (died 1865)
- Children: Lillian Sterling; (b. 1857; died 1934); at least 3 others

Military service
- Allegiance: United States
- Branch/service: United States Volunteers; Union Army
- Years of service: 1836, 1861–1865
- Rank: Lt. Colonel, USV
- Unit: 2nd Reg. Wis. Vol. Cavalry
- Battles/wars: Black Hawk War; American Civil War

Levi Sterling (January 2, 1804 – October 16, 1868) was an American farmer, politician, and Wisconsin pioneer. He was one of the first American settlers at what is now Iowa County, Wisconsin. He served five years in the Wisconsin Legislature and—before Wisconsin achieved statehood—he served three years in the Wisconsin Territorial Assembly. During the American Civil War, he served as a Union Army cavalry officer.

== Early life ==
Levi Sterling was born in Woodford County, Kentucky, in January 1804. He moved to Galena, Illinois, in March 1828 and, two months later, moved to the vicinity of what is now Mineral Point, Wisconsin—then part of the Michigan Territory. In 1830, he was appointed deputy clerk of the United States District Court and for the county court of Iowa County. During the Black Hawk War of 1832, he served as lieutenant in the volunteer militia company of Francis Gehon, in the army of Colonel Henry Dodge.

== After the Black Hawk War ==
After the war, he was appointed sheriff of Iowa County by Governor George Bryan Porter and was designated marshal for the United States District Court in Iowa and Crawford counties—at the time, this constituted roughly the western half of what is now the state of Wisconsin. In 1834, he performed the first census of his district, which then contained 3,443 inhabitants—810 in Crawford and 2,633 in Iowa—not including Native Americans.

In 1836, Sterling served as sergeant-at-arms for the last session of the Legislative Council of the Michigan Territory (the "Rump Council"), and then served in the same role at the second session of the Council of the Wisconsin Territory. He subsequently was elected transcribing clerk for the special session of the Assembly held in the Summer of 1838.

That Fall, he was elected as one of Iowa County's representatives in the Council (upper legislative chamber) of the Wisconsin Territory and served through all of the 2nd Wisconsin Territorial Assembly and the first session of the 3rd Wisconsin Territorial Assembly. He resigned in 1841 after being appointed receiver of public moneys in the Mineral Point land district.

He was elected sheriff of Iowa County in 1846 and re-elected in 1848. He was elected to the Wisconsin State Senate in 1850 for the 5th State Senate district—then comprising just Iowa County. After redistricting in 1852, he was elected to another term in the Senate for the 15th State Senate district—then comprising Iowa and Richland counties. While serving in the Senate, he was also appointed deputy surveyor of U.S. lands in Iowa and Wisconsin. In 1854, he was elected to another two-year term as sheriff. In 1857, Governor Coles Bashford appointed him as one of the three commissioners to locate and build a State Hospital for the Insane. He was subsequently elected to a final term in the Legislature, serving in the Wisconsin State Assembly in 1858. In politics, Sterling was a member of the Whig Party until the creation of the Republican Party in 1854.

== Civil War and aftermath ==
At the outbreak of the American Civil War, Sterling received a commission to raise a company of volunteers from the Mineral Point area for the 2nd Wisconsin Cavalry Regiment. When the regiment was organized in the Fall of 1861, he was mustered into service as major for the 2nd battalion of the regiment, under Colonel Cadwallader C. Washburn. The 2nd Wisconsin Cavalry served in the western theater of the war. After a year, he was promoted to lieutenant colonel of the regiment, and served in that capacity for another year, resigning in June 1863.

Sterling died of inflammation of the lungs and pleurisy at his home near Mineral Point in October 1868. He was survived by three daughters and one son.

Wisconsin State Assembly
Preceded by Thomas S. Allen	Member of the Wisconsin State Assembly from the Iowa 2nd district January 4, 1858 – January 3, 1859	Succeeded by John Toay
Wisconsin Senate
Preceded by M. M. Cothren	Member of the Wisconsin Senate from the 5th district January 6, 1851 – January 3, 1853	Succeeded by Edward M. Hunter
Preceded by Andrew Palmer	Member of the Wisconsin Senate from the 15th district January 3, 1853 – January 1, 1855	Succeeded by Amasa Cobb
Legal offices
Preceded by	Sheriff of Iowa County, Wisconsin; January 4, 1847 – January 6, 1851	Succeeded by R. S. Vivian
Preceded by Charles N. Mumford	Sheriff of Iowa County, Wisconsin; January 1, 1855 – January 5, 1857	Succeeded by T. McFarland
