= Camp Jackson =

Camp Jackson may refer to:

- Camp Jackson (Alabama), a camp near Scottsboro, Alabama
- Camp Jackson (California), a post located near Ione, California in Amador County during the American Civil War
- Initial name for Fort Jackson (South Carolina), a US Army base
- Camp Jackson Affair, a military encounter during the American Civil War which occurred outside of St. Louis in what has been called "Camp Jackson"
- Camp Jackson (Korea), a US Army base south of Uijeongbu, South Korea
- A temporary camp in Goodale Park, Columbus, Ohio, used as a staging area for Union troops during the American Civil War

== See also ==
- Fort Jackson (disambiguation)
