= George G. Cox =

American farmer and politician

George Goldsmith Cox (November 24, 1842 – February 19, 1920) was an American farmer and politician.

Born in Suffolk County, New York, Cox moved to Mineral Point, Wisconsin in 1850 and was a farmer. During the American Civil War, Cox served in the 2nd Wisconsin Cavalry Regiment. Cox served as chairman of the Mineral Point Town Board and superintendent of the poor. In 1879, 1880, 1885, and 1887, Cox served in the Wisconsin State Assembly and was a Republican. Cox died in Mineral Point, Wisconsin.
