= Llywelyn Breese =

American politician

10th Secretary of State of Wisconsin
- In office January 3, 1870 – January 5, 1874
- Governor: Lucius Fairchild; Cadwallader C. Washburn
- Preceded by: Thomas Allen
- Succeeded by: Peter Doyle

Treasurer of Columbia County, Wisconsin
- In office January 1861 – January 1867

Personal details
- Born: May 13, 1833 Mallwyd, Merionethshire, Wales, UK
- Died: November 28, 1922 (aged 89) Portage, Wisconsin, U.S.
- Resting place: Silver Lake Cemetery, Portage
- Party: Republican
- Spouse: Mary Ann Evans (m. 1863–1922)
- Children: William Llewellyn Breese^{(b. 1864; died 1954)}; Mary Breese^{(b. 1867; died 1957)}; Eleanor Breese^{(b. 1869; died 1932)}; Carrie Breese^{(b. 1872; died 1872)}; Llewelyn Breese Jr.^{(b. 1874; died 1965)}; Rodney Edward Breese^{(b. 1879; died 1955)}; Robert Breese^{(b. 1883; died 1885)}
- Occupation: Businessman, politician

Llywelyn Breese Sr. (May 13, 1833 – November 28, 1922) was a Welsh American immigrant, businessman, Republican politician, and Wisconsin pioneer. He served as the 10th Secretary of State of Wisconsin, from 1870 to 1874. Prior to winning statewide office, he held several local offices in Portage, Wisconsin, and served six years as treasurer of Columbia County, Wisconsin. He was also the founder and first president of the City Bank of Portage, one of the earliest banks in Wisconsin, and owned several other businesses throughout his life. His first name was sometimes alternatively spelled "Llewellyn", or simply abbreviated "Ll."

== Biography ==
Llywelyn Breese was born May 13, 1833, in Mallwyd, Merionethshire, Wales. He served as Wisconsin's tenth Secretary of State for two terms from January 3, 1870, to January 5, 1874. He was a Republican who served under governors Lucius Fairchild and Cadwallader C. Washburn. He resided in Portage, Wisconsin, at the time of his election.

Party political offices
Preceded by Thomas Allen	Republican nominee for Secretary of State of Wisconsin; 1869, 1871	Succeeded by Ephraim W. Young
Political offices
Preceded by Thomas Allen	Secretary of State of Wisconsin; January 3, 1870 – January 5, 1874	Succeeded by Peter Doyle
