= Walker House (Mineral Point, Wisconsin) =

Coordinates: 42.8590°N 90.1760°W

The Walker House is an inn and restaurant in Mineral Point, in Iowa County, Wisconsin. It is one of the oldest inns in the state.

== History ==
The house was built in 1836 and did a brisk business for many years, serving as a meeting house for people from all over the region. On November 1, 1842, a public hanging took place at the Walker House when William Caffee was executed for shooting another man in an argument. The hanging was a strange affair, with the condemned man being brought to the inn astride his coffin, beating out the tune of a funeral march with empty beer bottles.

In 1957, the inn closed its doors and stood vacant for over seven years, abandoned to vandalism. In 1964, the building was purchased by Ted Landon, who was intent on restoring the place to its former glory. In 1974, the tavern and inn re-opened. However, things did not go well for Landon and his partners. In 1978, they sold the inn to Dr. David Ruf, who placed the management of the place in the hands of Walker Calvert. The current owners are Dan and Kathy Vaillancourt.
