= Fort Jackson =

Fort Jackson may refer to several places or things:

- Fort Jackson (Alabama), also called Fort Toulouse, a War of 1812 fort
- Fort Jackson (Colorado), a frontier trading post located near present-day Ione, Colorado
- Fort Jackson, Louisiana, an American Civil War–era fort
- Fort Jackson (Pennsylvania), a frontier and Revolutionary War fort in western Pennsylvania
- Fort Jackson (South Carolina), a modern U.S. Army post
- Fort Jackson (Virginia), an American Civil War–era fort that defended Washington, D.C.
- Fort Jackson (Wisconsin), an American fort used during the Black Hawk War of 1832
- Fort James Jackson, a War of 1812 fort that defended Savannah, Georgia
- USS Fort Jackson, an American Civil War–era ship
- Treaty of Fort Jackson, an 1814 treaty
- Battle of Forts Jackson and St. Philip, a battle in the American Civil War
