= Hans Warner =

19th century American politician

12th Secretary of State of Wisconsin
- In office January 7, 1878 – January 2, 1882
- Governor: William E. Smith
- Preceded by: Peter Doyle
- Succeeded by: Ernst Timme

Member of the Wisconsin Senate from the 25th district
- In office January 1, 1883 – January 4, 1887
- Preceded by: George B. Burrows
- Succeeded by: William A. Rust

Personal details
- Born: Hans Bertel Pederson; July 12, 1844 Oppland, Sweden–Norway
- Died: August 18, 1896 (aged 52) Ellsworth, Wisconsin, U.S.
- Resting place: Maple Grove Cemetery, Ellsworth, Wisconsin
- Party: Republican
- Spouse: Julia E. Hudson (died 1916)

Military service
- Allegiance: United States
- Branch/service: United States Army; Union Army
- Years of service: 1864
- Rank: Corporal, USV
- Unit: 37th Reg. Wis. Vol. Infantry
- Battles/wars: American Civil War: Siege of Petersburg; Battle of the Crater (WIA / POW)

Hans Bertel Warner (born Hans Bertel Pederson; July 12, 1844 – August 18, 1896) was a Norwegian American immigrant, farmer, and Republican politician. He was the 12th Secretary of State of Wisconsin and served four years in the Wisconsin State Senate, representing Eau Claire, Pepin, and Pierce counties.

== Early life ==
Warner was born Hans Bertel in the valley of Gudbrandsdalen in Oppland, Norway. As a young boy in 1849, he emigrated to the United States with his parents. They originally settled in Dodge County, Wisconsin, but in 1855 relocated to Martell, in Pierce County, Wisconsin. His mother died that year and he was subsequently adopted out of the family by Judson and Almira Warner. Hans was educated in common schools and worked on his adopted father's farm until 1864, when, at age 19, he volunteered for service in the American Civil War.

== Civil War service ==
On March 28, 1864, Warner was enrolled as a private in Company G of the 37th Wisconsin Infantry Regiment. The 37th Wisconsin Infantry had been called to urgent service that month, so the bulk of the regiment had already left the state by the time Warner enrolled. His company took several more weeks to complete its enlistment, and traveled to Virginia in June 1864, joining the regiment entrenched in the Siege of Petersburg.

Just a month after his arrival at Petersburg, on July 30, 1864, Warner participated in the Battle of the Crater. The "Crater" refers to the massive detonation of a sapper mine under a Confederate defensive fortress. The 37th Wisconsin Infantry, among IX Corps, was part of the Union assault on the Confederate position after the detonation. The 37th Wisconsin took significant casualties during the battle, and Warner was wounded and captured by the enemy. Warner spent about two months in captivity at Danville and Libby Prison until he was paroled in September. He was mustered out of service due to his wounds.

== Political career ==
Warner returned to farming in Pierce County, and in 1868 was elected County Clerk, ultimately serving through 1877. During these years, he became a prominent member of the Republican Party of Wisconsin, attending several state party conventions. While serving as County Clerk, in 1875 he received the Republican Party nomination for Secretary of State of Wisconsin. In this election, he was narrowly defeated by Democrat Peter Doyle, receiving 49.82% of the vote. He was renominated for another attempt at the office in 1877, and this time went on to win the general election with 44% of the vote, defeating Democrat James B. Hays and Greenbacker Joseph H. Osborne. He resigned the County Clerk's office in December of that year and took office as the 12th Secretary of State on the first Monday of 1878. He was subsequently reelected in 1879, receiving 53% of the vote.

In 1881, Warner sought the Republican nomination for Governor of Wisconsin. His main rivals for the nomination were Jeremiah McLain Rusk, a U.S. Congressman and former Union Army colonel, and James M. Bingham, the incumbent Lieutenant Governor. After five ballots, Bingham's support collapsed; Rusk obtained the necessary majority of convention delegates and went on to become the 15th Governor of Wisconsin.

Warner left office in January 1882. Later that year, however, he began another campaign, running for Wisconsin State Senate in the 25th State Senate district. Warner's district comprised his home county, Pierce, as well as Pepin and Eau Claire counties. Warner won a comfortable victory in the general election, taking 61% of the vote over Democrat Frank N. McVean and Prohibitionist H. C. Van Hovenberg. In the 1882 election, voters also approved an amendment to the Constitution of Wisconsin which changed State Senate terms from two years to four years. Warner served through 1886, and was chairman of the Senate Committee on Finance, Banks, and Insurance.

== Later years ==
In 1892, Warner was elected probate judge in Pierce County. In 1895, Governor William H. Upham appointed him to the State Board of Control of Reformatory, Charitable, and Penal Institutions. The three-member board chose Warner as President, where he served until his death in August 1896.

Warner was stricken with a stomach ailment in the summer of 1896, which was apparently exacerbated by a trip to Milwaukee to attend the Republican State Convention. He died at his home in Ellsworth on August 18, 1896.

== Personal life ==
Warner was one of five children born to Peder Bertilson and Mari Olsdatter Berge (née Sønstegaard). All five children were born in Norway, and the family emigrated aboard a ship named Preciosa. For unknown reasons, Hans was adopted out of the family to the home of Judson and Almira Warner. His biological brothers, Ole and Amund Pederson, both also served in the Union Army during the Civil War.

Warner married Julia E. Hudson but had no known children.

== Electoral history ==
=== Wisconsin Secretary of State (1875, 1877, 1879) ===
Wisconsin Secretary of State Election, 1875
Party	Candidate	Votes	%	±%
General Election, November 2, 1875
Democratic	Peter Doyle	85,102	50.18%	
Republican	Hans B. Warner	84,484	49.82%	
Plurality		618	0.36%	
Total votes		169,586	100.0%	
Democratic gain from Republican				

Wisconsin Secretary of State Election, 1877
Party	Candidate	Votes	%	±%
General Election, November 6, 1877
Republican	Hans B. Warner	78,506	44.80%	−5.02%
Democratic	James B. Hays	71,659	40.89%	−9.29%
Greenback	Joseph H. Osborne	25,077	14.31%	
Plurality		6,847	3.91%	+3.54%
Total votes		175,242	100.0%	+3.34%
Republican gain from Democratic				

Wisconsin Secretary of State Election, 1879
Party	Candidate	Votes	%	±%
General Election, November 4, 1879
Republican	Hans B. Warner (incumbent)	100,908	53.54%	+8.74%
Democratic	Samuel Ryan Jr.	74,813	39.69%	−1.20%
Greenback	George W. Lee	12,752	6.77%	−7.54%
Plurality		26,095	13.85%	+9.94%
Total votes		188,473	100.0%	+7.55%
Republican hold				

Party political offices
Preceded by Ephraim W. Young	Republican nominee for Secretary of State of Wisconsin; 1875, 1877, 1879	Succeeded by Ernst Timme
Wisconsin Senate
Preceded by George B. Burrows	Member of the Wisconsin Senate from the 25th district January 1, 1883 – January 4, 1887	Succeeded by William A. Rust
Political offices
Preceded by Peter Doyle	Secretary of State of Wisconsin; January 7, 1878 – January 2, 1882	Succeeded by Ernst Timme
