= Ernst Timme =

German-American politician (1843–1923)

13th Secretary of State of Wisconsin
- In office January 2, 1882 – January 5, 1891
- Governor: Jeremiah McLain Rusk; William D. Hoard
- Preceded by: Hans Warner
- Succeeded by: Thomas J. Cunningham

Member of the Wisconsin Senate from the 3rd district
- In office January 7, 1895 – January 2, 1899
- Preceded by: Adam Apple
- Succeeded by: John F. Reynolds

Personal details
- Born: Werden, Essen, Prussia; June 23, 1843
- Died: April 1, 1923 (aged 79) Kenosha, Wisconsin, U.S.
- Resting place: Green Ridge Cemetery, Kenosha, Wisconsin
- Party: Republican
- Spouse: Caroline J. Maas (m. 1867; died 1923)
- Children: Carrie M. Timme; ^{born 1868; died 1868}; Florence Timme; ^{born 1869; died 1874}; Lettie D. Timme; ^{died young}; Albert F. Timme; ^{born 1874; died 1962}; Madaline Elizabeth "Lena" (Schroeder); ^{born 1878; died 1955}; Ernst G. Timme; ^{born 1882; died 1888}; Elizabeth A. Timme; ^{born 1886; died 1968}; Zalmon G. Timme; ^{born 1889; died 1890}

Military service
- Allegiance: United States
- Branch/service: United States Army; Union Army
- Years of service: 1861–1863
- Rank: Private; Brevet Captain, USV
- Unit: 1st Reg. Wis. Vol. Infantry
- Battles/wars: American Civil War: Battle of Perryville; Battle of Stones River; Tullahoma campaign; Battle of Chickamauga

Ernst Gerhardt Timme (June 23, 1843 – April 1, 1923) was a German American immigrant, farmer, and Republican politician. He was the 13th Secretary of State of Wisconsin (1882–1891) and a member of the Wisconsin State Senate, representing Racine and Kenosha counties. He was a Union Army volunteer in the American Civil War and lost an arm at the Battle of Chickamauga.

== Early life ==
Timme was born in Werden, a borough of the city of Essen, in what is now western Germany. At the time of his birth, this region was part of the Rhine Province, part of the Kingdom of Prussia. At age 5, Timme emigrated with his parents to the United States by sea. The voyage was difficult, the boat was shipwrecked twice during the crossing, and ultimately took seven weeks to reach its destination. The Timme family arrived at Southport, Wisconsin Territory (now Kenosha), on August 17 of that year. They quickly acquired land in the western part of the county, in the town of Wheatland, and established a homestead. Timme was educated in the common schools in Wheatland, and, on turning 18, he enlisted in the Union Army for service in the American Civil War.

== Civil War service ==
Timme enrolled with a company of volunteers from Kenosha County on a three-year enlistment. The company proceeded to Camp Scott in Milwaukee, and was integrated into the 1st Wisconsin Infantry Regiment, which was reorganizing after its previous 3-month enlistment had expired. Timme's company was designated Company C.

The reorganized 1st Wisconsin was ordered to proceed to Jefferson, Indiana, and then to Elizabethtown, Kentucky, where they were attached to the brigade of General James S. Negley, in the division of Alexander McDowell McCook, and shortly thereafter became part of the Army of the Cumberland. With his regiment, Timme participated in the battles of Perryville, Stones River, Hoover's Gap, and Chickamauga, in the campaign for control over Middle Tennessee in the western theater of the war. Timme was wounded during the first day of fighting at the Battle of Chickamauga; the wound was so severe that the surgeon had to amputate his left arm. Though only a private at the time, for his bravery at Chickamauga, he received a brevet to the rank of captain, and later advanced to colonel.

== Postbellum career ==
After his amputation, Timme decided to pursue higher education at Bryant & Stratton College in Cleveland, Ohio, where he graduated in 1865. He returned to Wheatland, Wisconsin, where he taught school. Back in Kenosha County, he quickly entered public service—he was elected town clerk, and served as town assessor and justice of the peace. Then, in 1866, he was elected Kenosha County Clerk and was re-elected seven times, serving fifteen years.

Timme was first discussed as a candidate for Secretary of State at the 1877 State Republican Convention, which ultimately nominated Hans Warner, who was elected. In 1881, Warner sought the party's nomination for Governor instead, and the Party selected Timme as their nominee for Secretary of State that year. Timme defeated Democrat Michael Johnson, of Springdale, with 48% of the vote. His two-year term, along with all other statewide elected officers, was subsequently extended to three years by an amendment to the state constitution, which moved state officer elections from odd-numbered years to even-numbered years. He was re-elected in 1884, 1886, and 1888, leaving office in 1891.

That year, he was appointed as an auditor of the United States Postal Service by President Benjamin Harrison, serving until Harrison left office in 1893. After the change in administration, Timme returned to Wisconsin, and, in 1894, he won election to the Wisconsin State Senate, representing all of Racine and Kenosha counties in the recently redrawn 3rd State Senate district. Timme served a single four-year term in the Senate, and afterward received another federal appointment. President William McKinley appointed him an auditor in the United States Department of State, where he remained for the next seven years. He was then transferred back to the U.S. Postal Service under the presidency of Theodore Roosevelt, where he served another three years. At the end of Roosevelt's presidency, Timme retired and returned to Kenosha.

== Personal life and family ==
Ernst Timme married Caroline J. Maas, of Wheatland, on March 25, 1867. They had at least eight children, though only three survived to adulthood.

Party political offices
Preceded by Hans Warner	Republican nominee for Secretary of State of Wisconsin; 1881, 1884, 1886, 1888	Succeeded by Edwin D. Coe
Wisconsin Senate
Preceded by Adam Apple	Member of the Wisconsin State Senate from the 3rd district January 7, 1895 – January 2, 1899	Succeeded by John F. Reynolds
Political offices
Preceded by Hans Warner	Secretary of State of Wisconsin; 1882–1891	Succeeded by Thomas J. Cunningham
