= Lee Croft (American football) =

American football player (1898–1984)

Profile
- Position: Guard

Personal information
- Born: November 5, 1898; Mineral Point, Wisconsin, U.S.
- Died: January 28, 1984 (aged 85); Ector, Texas, U.S.
- Listed height: 6 ft 1 in (1.85 m)
- Listed weight: 190 lb (86 kg)

Career information
- College: Wisconsin-Platteville

Career history
- Racine Legion (1924)

Career statistics
- Games played: 1
- Stats at Pro Football Reference

Leland Reynolds Croft (November 5, 1898 – January 28, 1984) was an American football player and petroleum engineer.

Croft was born in 1898 in Mineral Point, Wisconsin, and attended Mineral Point High School. He attended the Wisconsin School of Engineering where he received a degree in petroleum engineering.

Croft played one game as a guard in the National Football League (NFL) for the Racine Legion during the 1924 NFL season.

Croft moved to Texas by the 1930s. As of 1935, he was employed by Stanolind Oil Company in Houston. He moved to Odessa, Texas, in 1945. Croft worked as a geologist, engineer, and appraiser in the oil business. From 1954 to 1964, he also served on the board of regents of Odessa College. Croft died in 1984 at the Medical Center Hospital in Odessa.
