= Fort Jackson (Wisconsin) =

Coordinates: 42°51′32.3″N 90°10′37.9″W

Fort Jackson was a frontier fort located in Mineral Point, Michigan Territory, and constructed during the 1832 Black Hawk War.

== History ==
Fort Jackson was constructed in Mineral Point, Michigan Territory, during the 1832 Black Hawk War. The wooden stockade was constructed using logs from some of the early log cabins located in Mineral Point. Fort Jackson's commanding officer was Captain John F. O'Neal. A historical marker commemorating the site is located at the junction of Commerce and Fountain streets in Mineral Point.
