= Oshkosh Northwestern =

Newspaper in Oshkosh, Wisconsin

- Type: Daily newspaper
- Owner: USA Today Co.
- Publisher: Andy Fisher
- Editor: Katy Macek
- Headquarters: 224 State St., Oshkosh, Wisconsin
- Circulation: 3,888 (as of 2022)
- Website: thenorthwestern.com

The Oshkosh Northwestern is a daily newspaper based in Oshkosh, Wisconsin. The Northwestern is primarily distributed in Winnebago, Waushara, and Green Lake counties.

== History ==
For the forty years preceding establishment of the newspaper's name as Oshkosh Northwestern in 1979, the newspaper was known as the Oshkosh Daily Northwestern.

The Northwestern was owned by the Schwalm and Heaney families until 1998, when it was sold to Ogden Newspapers; Ogden traded the paper to Thomson Newspapers two months later for four papers in Ohio and Pennsylvania. It has been part of the Gannett chain of newspapers since 2000, when it was purchased from Thomson Corporation.

In 2022, the Northwestern moved to a six-day printing schedule, eliminating its printed Saturday edition.

- Daily Northwestern Building
- U.S. National Register of Historic Places
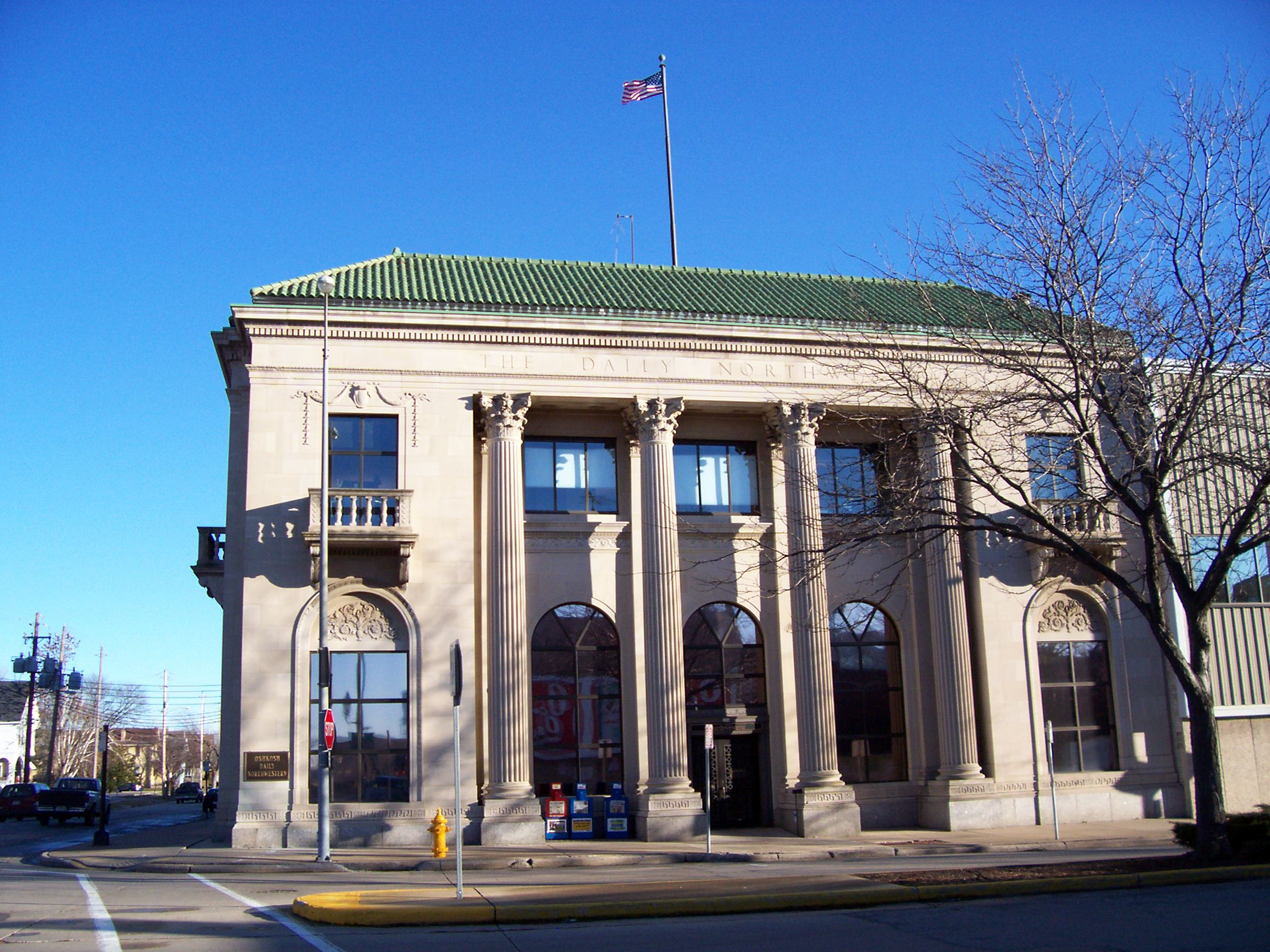
- Building in downtown Oshkosh
- Location: 224 State St. Oshkosh, Wisconsin
- Architect: Auler, Jenson & Brown
- NRHP reference No.: 82000732
- Added to NRHP: May 13, 1982

== Building ==
The building for the newspaper was listed on the National Register of Historic Places on May 13, 1982. It is a significant example of 1930 Renaissance architecture.

In 2017 the building was purchased by Oshkosh Business Center III LLC.
