= William Davidson (Pennsylvania politician) =

American politician (1783–1867)

William Davidson (February 14, 1783 – March 2, 1867) was an American politician from Pennsylvania who served as a Democratic member of the Pennsylvania House of Representatives from 1814 to 1818 including as Speaker of the House from 1817 to 1818 and as an Independent Republican member of the Pennsylvania Senate for the 17th district from 1817 to 1824.

== Early life ==
Davidson was born in Carlisle, Pennsylvania. He served as prothonotary and worked as manager of the Laurel Furnace in Bedford County, Pennsylvania. In 1808, he moved to Connellsville, Pennsylvania, and worked as ironmaster at the Breakneck Furnace. He served in the War of 1812 and was held as a prisoner of war after Fort Detroit was surrendered by William Hull. After the war, he returned to Connellsville, married the widow Sarah Rogers Blackstone and together they had five children.

== Career ==
He served as a Democrat in the Pennsylvania House of Representatives from 1814 to 1818 and was elected as the 52nd Speaker of the House on December 2, 1817. He also served in the Pennsylvania Senate for the 17th district from 1817 to 1824.

He died on March 2, 1867, in Connellsville, Pennsylvania.

== See also ==
- List of speakers of the Pennsylvania House of Representatives

== Bibliography ==
- Biographical and Portrait Cyclopedia of Fayette County, Pennsylvania editorially managed by John M. Gresham assisted in the compilation by Samuel T. Wiley, a Citizen of the county. Compiled and Published by John M. Gresham & Co. Chicago: 1889
- History of Fayette County, Pennsylvania: with biographical sketches of many of its pioneers and prominent men by Franklin Ellis 1828–1886. p. 362
