= Peter Doyle (politician) =

American politician

Peter Doyle (December 8, 1844 – October 27, 1900) was an Irish-American politician from the U.S. state of Wisconsin.

== Biography ==
Born in Myshall, County Carlow, Ireland, Doyle moved with his parents to Franklin, Wisconsin, in Milwaukee County, Wisconsin, in 1850. Doyle taught school and studied law in Milwaukee, Wisconsin. He served as that state's eleventh Secretary of State, serving for two terms from January 5, 1874, to January 7, 1878. He was a Democrat and served under governors William Robert Taylor and Harrison Ludington. He also served in the Wisconsin State Assembly from Crawford County, Wisconsin, in 1873. He resided in Prairie du Chien, Wisconsin, at the time of his election and served as secretary to John Lawler and Hercules Dousman. From 1884 to 1900, Doyle practiced law in Milwaukee, Wisconsin. He took a law course at Yale University. In 1900, Doyle moved to Jersey City, New Jersey, where he died on October 27, 1900.

Political offices
Preceded by Llywelyn Breese	Secretary of State of Wisconsin; 1874–1878	Succeeded by Hans Warner
