= John B. Terry =

American politician

John B. Terry (January 18, 1796 – January 11, 1874) was an American pioneer, merchant, soldier, and territorial legislator.

Born in Coxsackie, New York, Terry served in the United States Army during the War of 1812. He moved to St. Charles, Missouri where he was a merchant and then to Sangamon County, Illinois. In 1829, Terry moved to Michigan Territory and settled in Mineral Point where he was a merchant and smelter. Terry served as a captain in the Black Hawk War of 1832. From 1836 to 1838, Terry served in the Wisconsin Territorial Council of the Wisconsin Territorial Legislature. He died in Mineral Point, Wisconsin.
