= Amasa Cobb =

American politician and judge (1823–1905)

The Honorable Amasa Cobb
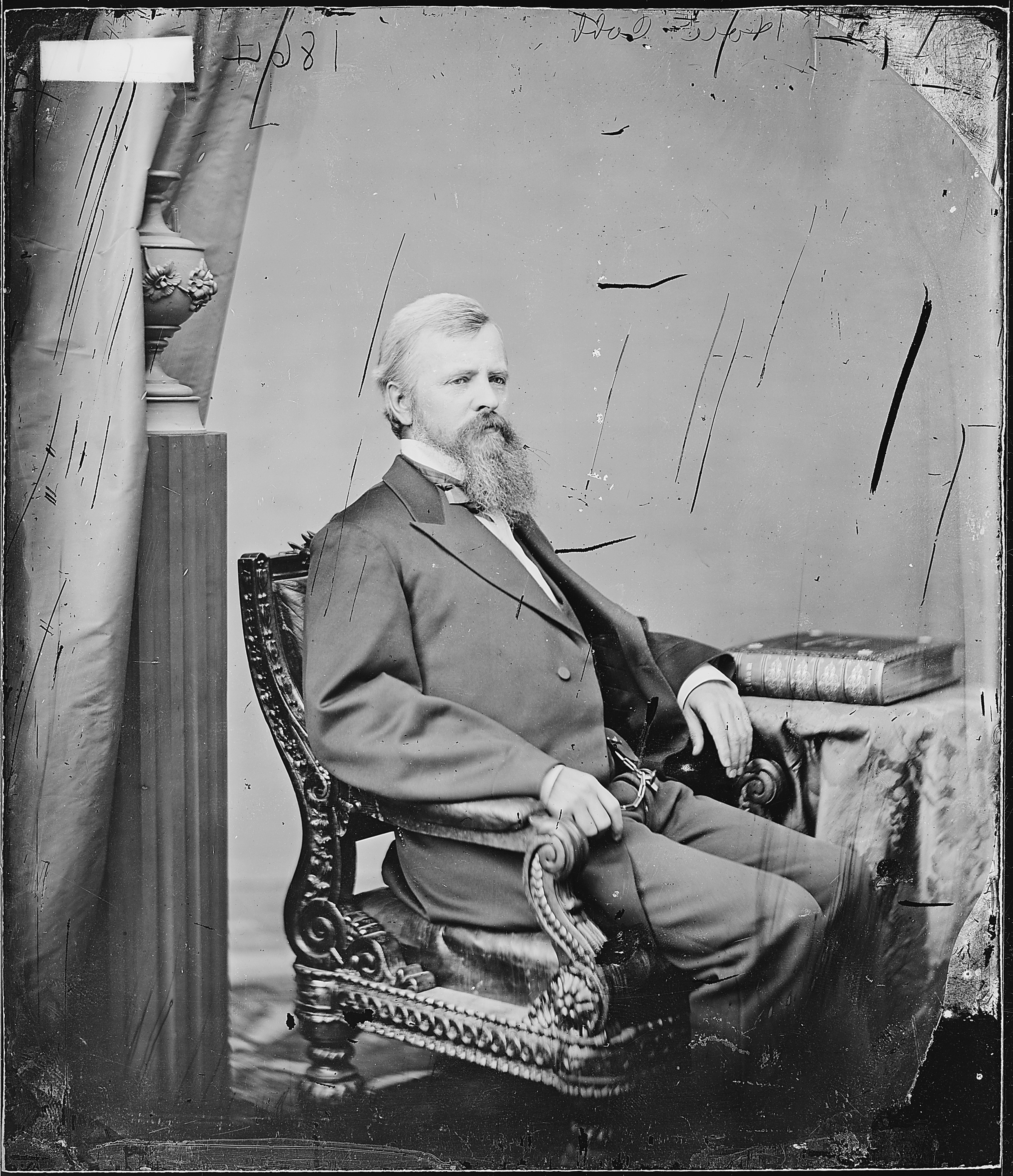

6th and 9th Chief Justice of the Nebraska Supreme Court
- In office 1890–1892
- Preceded by: Manoah B. Reese
- Succeeded by: Samuel Maxwell
- In office 1884–1886
- Preceded by: George B. Lake
- Succeeded by: Samuel Maxwell

Justice of the Nebraska Supreme Court
- In office 1878–1892
- Preceded by: Daniel Gantt
- Succeeded by: Alfred M. Post

5th Mayor of Lincoln, Nebraska
- In office 1875–1876
- Preceded by: Samuel W. Little
- Succeeded by: Robert D. Silver, Jr.

Member of the U.S. House of Representatives from Wisconsin's 3rd district
- In office March 4, 1863 – March 3, 1871
- Preceded by: A. Scott Sloan
- Succeeded by: J. Allen Barber

13th Speaker of the Wisconsin State Assembly
- In office January 9, 1861 – January 6, 1862
- Preceded by: William P. Lyon
- Succeeded by: Joseph W. Beardsley

Member of the Wisconsin Senate from the 15th district
- In office January 1, 1855 – January 5, 1857
- Preceded by: Levi Sterling
- Succeeded by: Lemuel W. Joiner

Member of the Wisconsin State Assembly from the Iowa 2nd district
- In office January 2, 1860 – January 6, 1862
- Preceded by: Levi Sterling
- Succeeded by: John H. Vivian

Personal details
- Born: September 27, 1823 Crawford County, Illinois, US
- Died: July 5, 1905 (aged 81) Los Angeles, California, US
- Resting place: Wyuka Cemetery
- Party: Republican
- Spouses: Philadelphia Stone Moffett; (m. 1849; died 1896)
- Children: 1

Military service
- Allegiance: United States
- Branch/service: United States Army; Union Army
- Years of service: 1861–1865
- Rank: Colonel, USV; Brevet Brigadier General, USV
- Unit: Army of the Potomac
- Commands: 5th Reg. Wis. Vol. Infantry; 43rd Reg. Wis. Vol. Infantry
- Battles/wars: American Civil War; Peninsula Campaign; Siege of Yorktown; Battle of Williamsburg; Seven Days Battles; Battle of Gaines's Mill; Battle of Garnett's & Golding's Farm; Maryland campaign; Battle of Antietam; Fredericksburg campaign; Battle of Fredericksburg

Amasa Cobb (September 27, 1823 – July 5, 1905) was an American politician and judge. He was the 6th and 9th chief justice of the Nebraska Supreme Court and the 5th mayor of Lincoln, Nebraska. Earlier in his life, he served four terms in the U.S. House of Representatives, representing Wisconsin's 2nd congressional district from 1863 to 1871. He also served several years in the Wisconsin Legislature, and was the 13th Speaker of the Wisconsin State Assembly (1861). He also served as a Union Army officer during the American Civil War.

== Biography ==
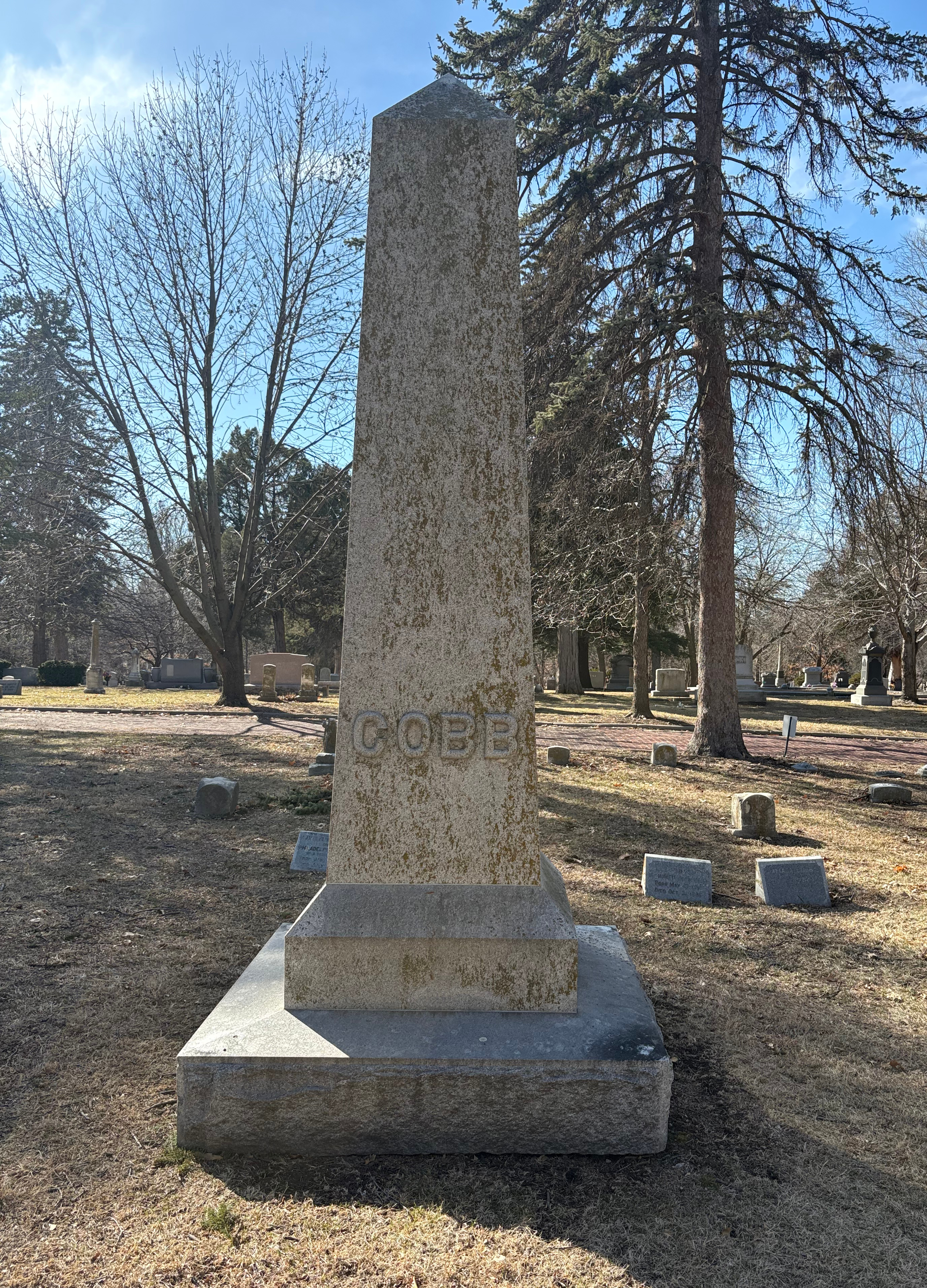
Cobb's grave at Wyuka Cemetery

Born in Crawford County, Illinois, near Palestine, Illinois, Cobb was the son of Nancy (Briggs) and John Cobb. He moved to the Wisconsin Territory in 1842 and mined for lead. He served in the Mexican–American War as a private. After the war he studied law, passed the bar and set up practice in Mineral Point, Wisconsin. He was a district attorney from 1850 to 1854, then was elected to the Wisconsin State Senate in 1855, serving until 1856. During his term, he was also the Adjutant General of Wisconsin from 1855 to 1858. He became a member of the Wisconsin State Assembly in 1860 and served as speaker in 1861.

At the outset of the Civil War, on July 12, 1861, he joined the Union army as Colonel of the 5th Wisconsin Infantry Regiment, serving in the Army of the Potomac in several campaigns and battles. Most notably, Cobb succeeded Brigadier General Winfield S. Hancock in command of a brigade in second division VI Corps at the Battle of Antietam, after Hancock was transferred to command the first division II Corps. In the fall of 1862, he was elected to the 38th Congress from Wisconsin's 3rd congressional district for a two-year term. Cobb was reelected to the 39th, 40th, and 41st Congresses, serving until 1871. His last action with 5th Wisconsin Infantry was the Battle of Fredericksburg.

Despite being a sitting Representative in the United States House of Representatives, he resumed his military career on September 29, 1864, when he was named as Colonel of the newly raised 43rd Wisconsin Infantry Regiment. After arriving at Nashville, Tennessee, in October, Cobb and his regiment guarded the important supply and railroad depot at Johnsonville in Benton County, Tennessee, on the Tennessee River. On November 4, Cobb's men fought off an attack by John Bell Hood's Confederates led by Major General Nathan Bedford Forrest in the Battle of Johnsonville. For the rest of the war, the regiment was positioned in various parts of Tennessee to guard railroads and supply routes, and Cobb briefly commanded a brigade under Major General Robert H. Milroy. He and his men were mustered out of the service on June 24, 1865 in Nashville before returning to Wisconsin and civilian life.

On January 13, 1866, President Andrew Johnson nominated Cobb for appointment to the grade of brevet brigadier general of volunteers to rank from March 13, 1865, for his distinguished services at the Battles of Williamsburg, Golding's Farm, Virginia, during the Seven Days Battles and Antietam, and the United States Senate confirmed the appointment on March 12, 1866. After the war, Cobb became a member of the Military Order of the Loyal Legion of the United States.

In 1871, Cobb moved to Lincoln, Nebraska, where he started to practice law again. He was appointed mayor of Lincoln in 1873, and then became associate justice of the Nebraska Supreme Court in 1878 to 1892. The last four years, from 1888 to 1892, he served as Nebraska's chief justice.

Amasa Cobb died in Los Angeles, California, on July 5, 1905. He was buried in Wyuka Cemetery, Lincoln, Nebraska.

== See also ==
- List of American Civil War brevet generals (Union)

== Notes ==
U.S. House of Representatives
Preceded by A. Scott Sloan	Member of the U.S. House of Representatives from Wisconsin's 3rd congressional district March 4, 1863 – March 3, 1871	Succeeded by J. Allen Barber
Political offices
Preceded by William P. Lyon	Speaker of the Wisconsin State Assembly; 1861 – 1862	Succeeded by James W. Beardsley
Preceded by Samuel W. Little	Mayor of Lincoln, Nebraska; 1875 – 1876	Succeeded by Robert D. Silver, Jr.
Legal offices
Preceded by Daniel Gantt	Justice of the Nebraska Supreme Court; 1878 – 1892	Succeeded by Alfred M. Post
Preceded by George B. Lake	Chief Justice of the Nebraska Supreme Court; 1884 – 1886	Succeeded by Samuel Maxwell
Preceded by Manoah B. Reese	Chief Justice of the Nebraska Supreme Court; 1890 – 1892	Succeeded by Samuel Maxwell
