= Pendarvis (Mineral Point, Wisconsin) =

Historic house in Wisconsin, United States

- U.S. National Register of Historic Places
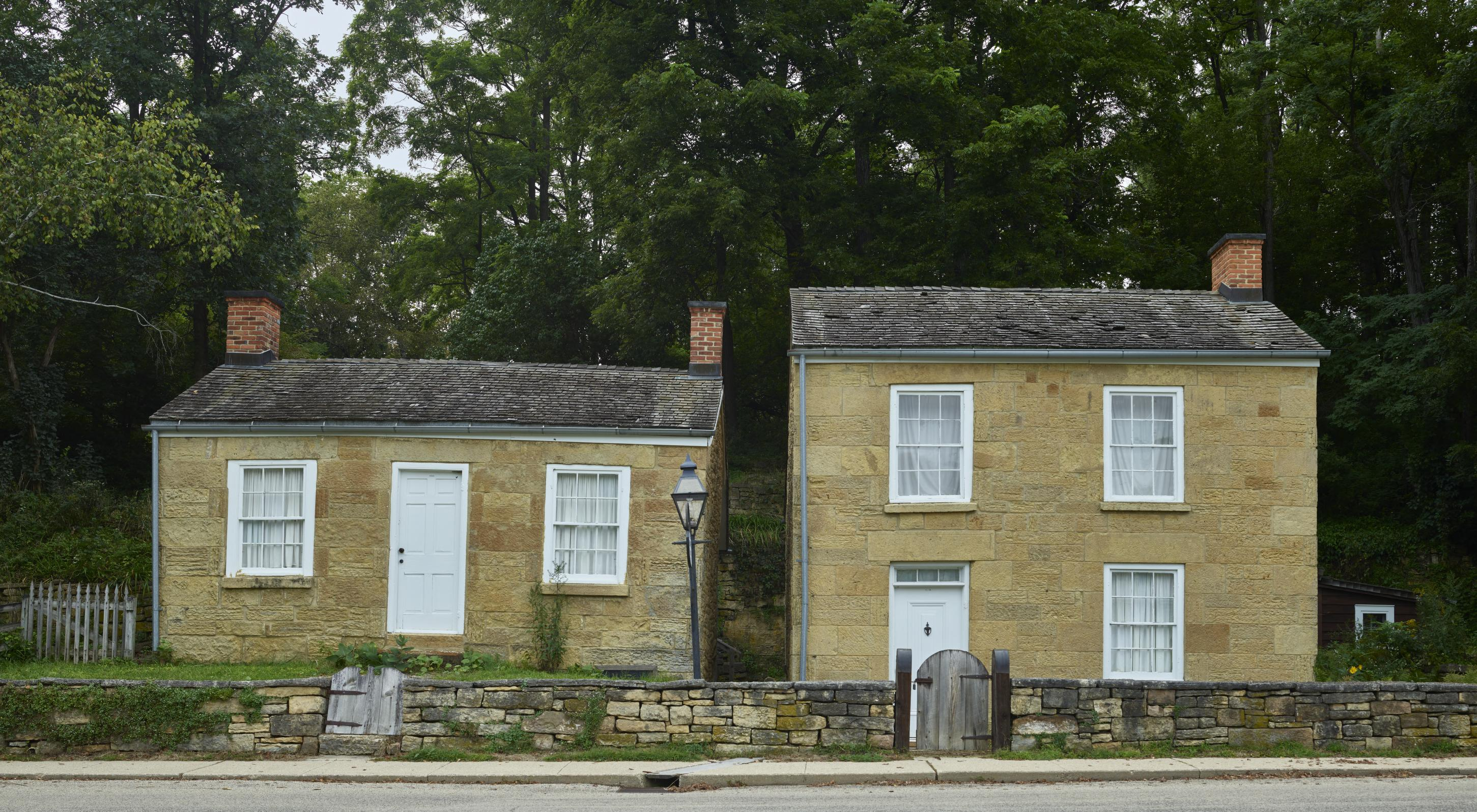
- Pendarvis (left) and Trelawny houses (right)

- Location within Wisconsin Location within the United States
- Location: 114 Shake Rag St., Mineral Point, Wisconsin
- Coordinates: 42°51′50″N 90°10′21″W
- Area: 4.6 acres (1.9 ha)
- Built: 1835
- Website: pendarvis.wisconsinhistory.org
- NRHP reference No.: 71000038
- Added to NRHP: January 25, 1971

Pendarvis is a historic site located in Mineral Point, Iowa County, Wisconsin, United States. The site, which is listed on the National Register of Historic Places, is made up of several 19th-century stone and timber cabins built by Cornish immigrants who came to Mineral Point to mine lead and zinc. Today the site is owned by the Wisconsin Historical Society and serves as a museum of Wisconsin's early lead mining history. Programs at the site also interpret the groundbreaking preservation work by Robert Neal and Edgar Hellum, begun during the Great Depression.

== History ==
During the 1830s and 1840s, the area that today comprises southwest Wisconsin and northwest Illinois was rapidly populated as miners came from across the United States and Europe to work the region's abundant lead deposits. Several mining boomtowns sprang up in the region, including Galena, Illinois; Platteville, Wisconsin; and Mineral Point, the location of Pendarvis. During the height of the mining era, the population of Mineral Point rose to over 4,000 as people migrated to the city to work in the lead mines. Many of the immigrants who came to Mineral Point were tin miners from Cornwall, at the southwestern tip of Great Britain. Many of the Cornish immigrants built simple houses in the town using wood or limestone taken from the local landscape. As time went on, however, the lead mines were exhausted and many of the miners moved on to other mining sites, especially California following the discovery of gold at Sutter's Mill in 1848. Other miners stayed in the area to mine zinc, which was also abundant, but by the early 20th century the zinc mines were also being abandoned.

== Preservation ==
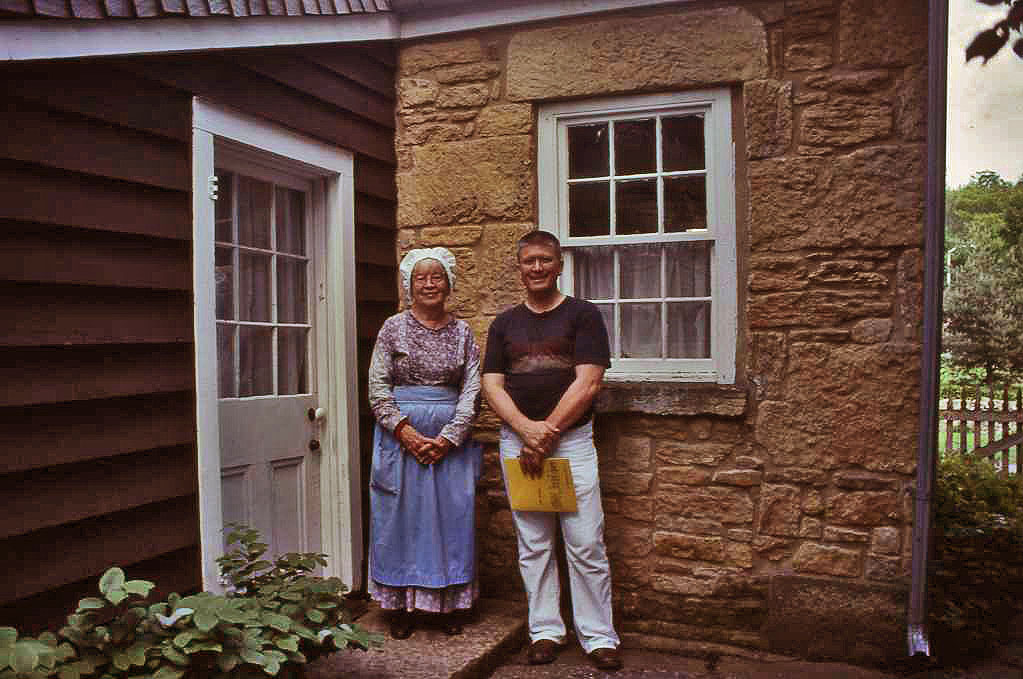
UW-Platteville professor of German Patrick Hagen with a Wisconsin Historical Society tour guide at Pendarvis.

In the 1920s and 1930s, many of the old cabins built by the Cornish miners were being torn down. Seeing this, a local resident named Robert Neal, together with Edgar Hellum, began to acquire and restore several of the old Cornish buildings. Neal and Hellum also gave Cornish-language names to each of the buildings they restored. They called their first project, a 1-story stone cabin, Pendarvis. In order to support the restoration of other buildings, Pendarvis House was turned into a restaurant serving authentic Cornish dishes such as Cornish pasty. The Pendarvis House Restaurant received wide acclaim, and helped finance Neal and Hellum's restoration of even more historic Cornish homes in Mineral Point.

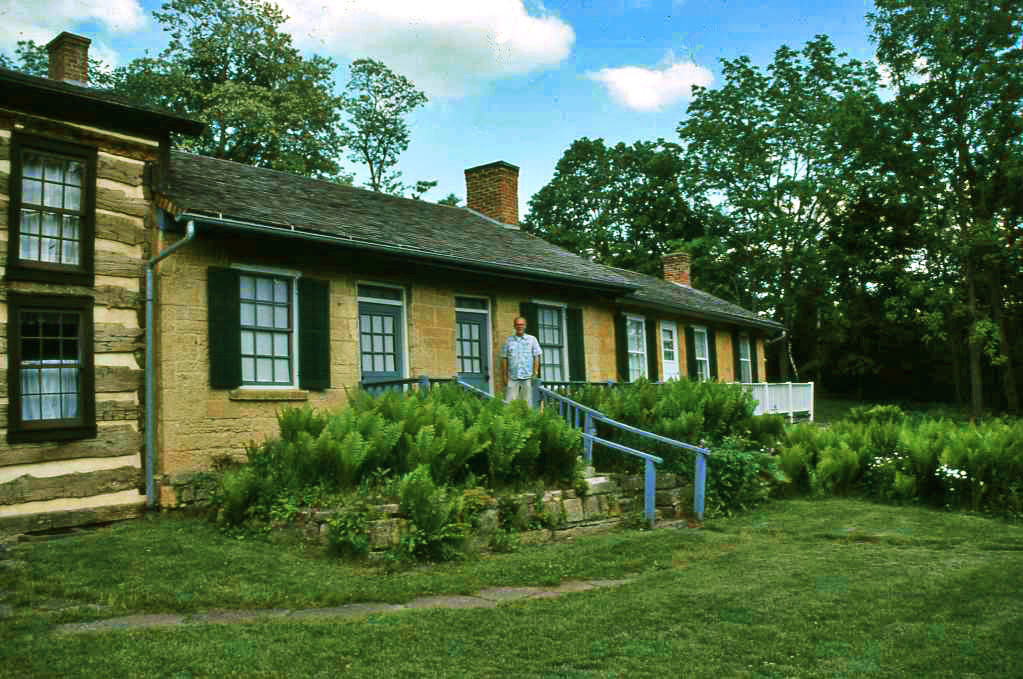
Cornish cabins

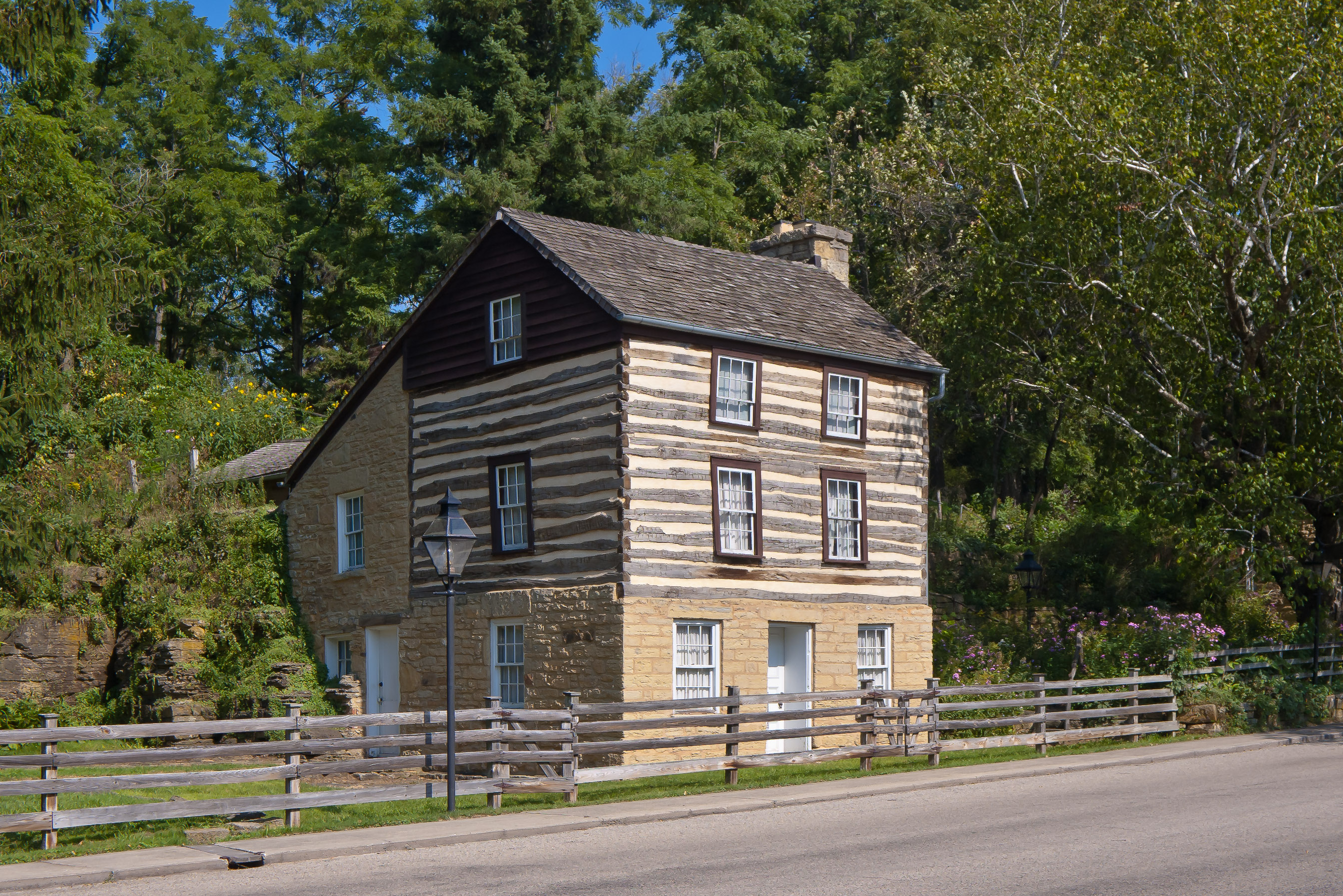
Polperro at Pendarvis

Following the restoration, the Pendarvis historic site included six cabins built by English and Cornish miners during the 1840s and 1850s. The Pendarvis house itself was built of locally quarried limestone and has walls that are 18 to 20 inches thick. Beside the Pendarvis house is the Trelawny, a 2-story cottage of similar construction. Nearby is Polperro, a 2 1/2-story house using stone for its first story and wood for its upper floors. Another Pendarvis building is the Rowhouse, which consists of three adjacent stone structures. The first house in the row was built as a free-standing building circa 1841. The second house was also built as a free-standing building circa 1844 or 1845. The final house, built between the other two houses and connecting to them, was built circa 1852.

== Historic site ==
The collection of buildings restored by Neal and Hellum was transferred to the Wisconsin Historical Society in 1970. A year later, they were opened to the public as the Pendarvis Historic Site. In addition to the cottages, the Wisconsin Historical Society acquired several acres of land on nearby Merry Christmas Mine Hill, the site of a historic zinc mine. Remnants of the mining activity are still visible, but much of the hill has been restored to natural prairie. Visitors to the site can explore the hill on a number of foot trails. The historic buildings are shown to the visiting public seasonally as a museum preserving the history of the region's mining industry and the lives of the miners who first developed the site. Many artifacts are on display in the buildings, including authentic mining tools and household items.
