= William A. Rust =

American businessman and politician (1844–1903)

William Aloney Rust (May 3, 1844 - March 3, 1903) was an American businessman and politician.

Born in Newport, Michigan, Rust was involved in the lumber business in Michigan. In 1871, Rust moved to Eau Claire, Wisconsin. He continued to be in the lumber business and was president of a bank. Rust served as Mayor of Eau Claire, Wisconsin. Then, in 1885 and 1887, Rust served in the Wisconsin State Senate as a Republican.
