= Mineral Point, Wisconsin =

- City
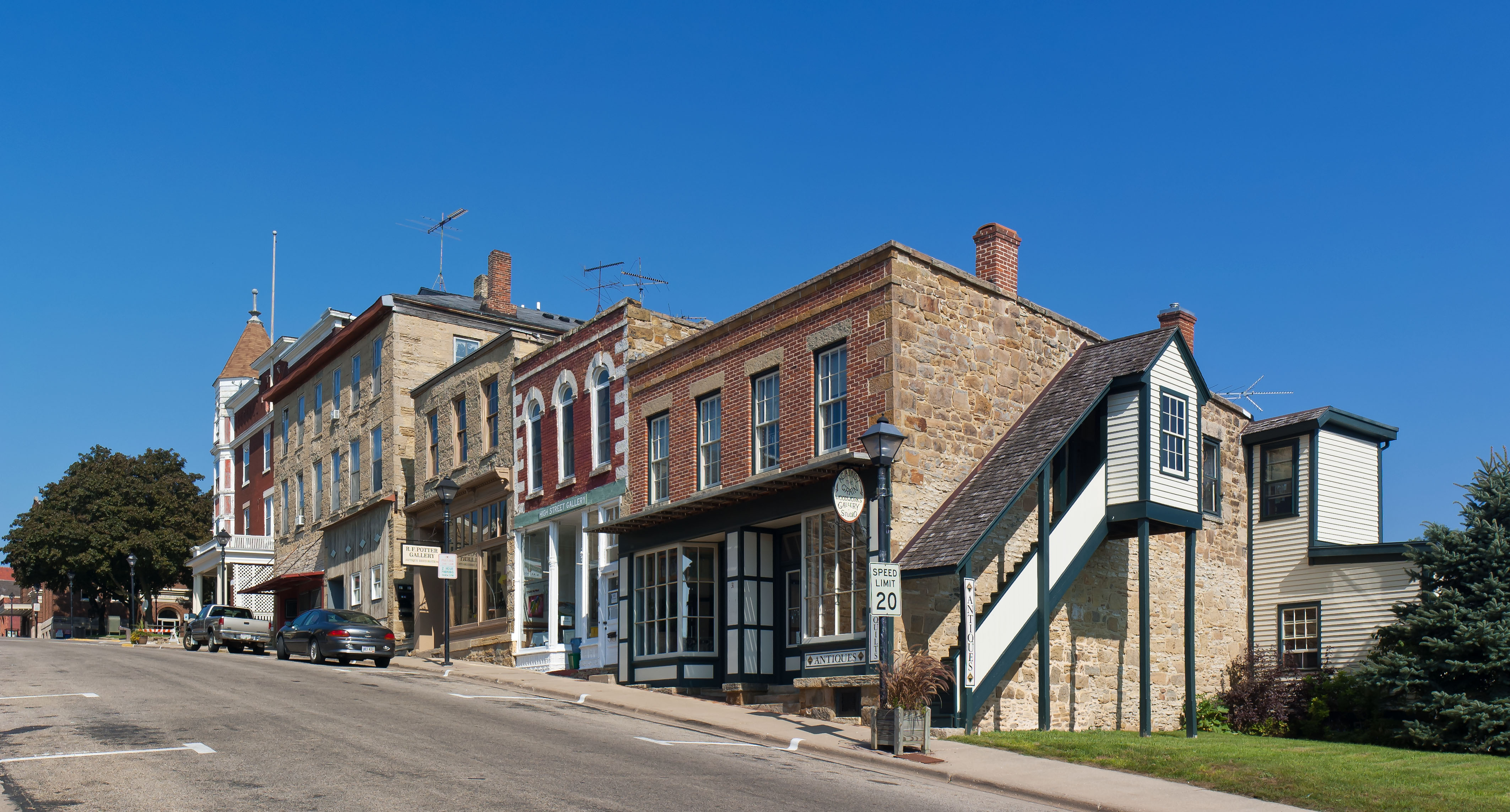
- High Street, Mineral Point

- Location of Mineral Point in Iowa County, Wisconsin.

- Location within Wisconsin Location within the United States
- Coordinates: 42°51′37″N 90°10′59″W
- Country: United States
- State: Wisconsin
- County: Iowa
- Settled: 1827

Government
  - Mayor: Danny Clark

Area
  - Total: 3.08 sq mi (7.97 km^{2})
  - Land: 3.08 sq mi (7.97 km^{2})
  - Water: 0 sq mi (0.00 km^{2})

Population (2020)
  - Total: 2,581
  - Density: 839/sq mi (324/km^{2})
- Time zone: UTC-6 (Central (CST))
  - Summer (DST): UTC-5 (CDT)
- Area code: 608
- FIPS code: 55-53100
- Website: cityofmineralpoint.com

Mineral Point is a city in Iowa County, Wisconsin, United States. The population was 2,581 at the 2020 census. The city is located within the Town of Mineral Point and is part of the Madison metropolitan area.

Mineral Point was settled in 1827, becoming a lead and zinc mining center, and commercial town in the 19th and early 20th centuries. It initially drew a considerable number of Cornish-immigrant miners and their families. In the mid-20th century it attracted artists and an artist's colony and its tourism industry began to grow. The city's well-preserved historical character within the varied natural topography of the driftless area has made it a regional tourist destination. Mineral Point is sometimes called Wisconsin's third oldest city, but the Wisconsin Historical Society notes several older colonial settlements.

== History ==
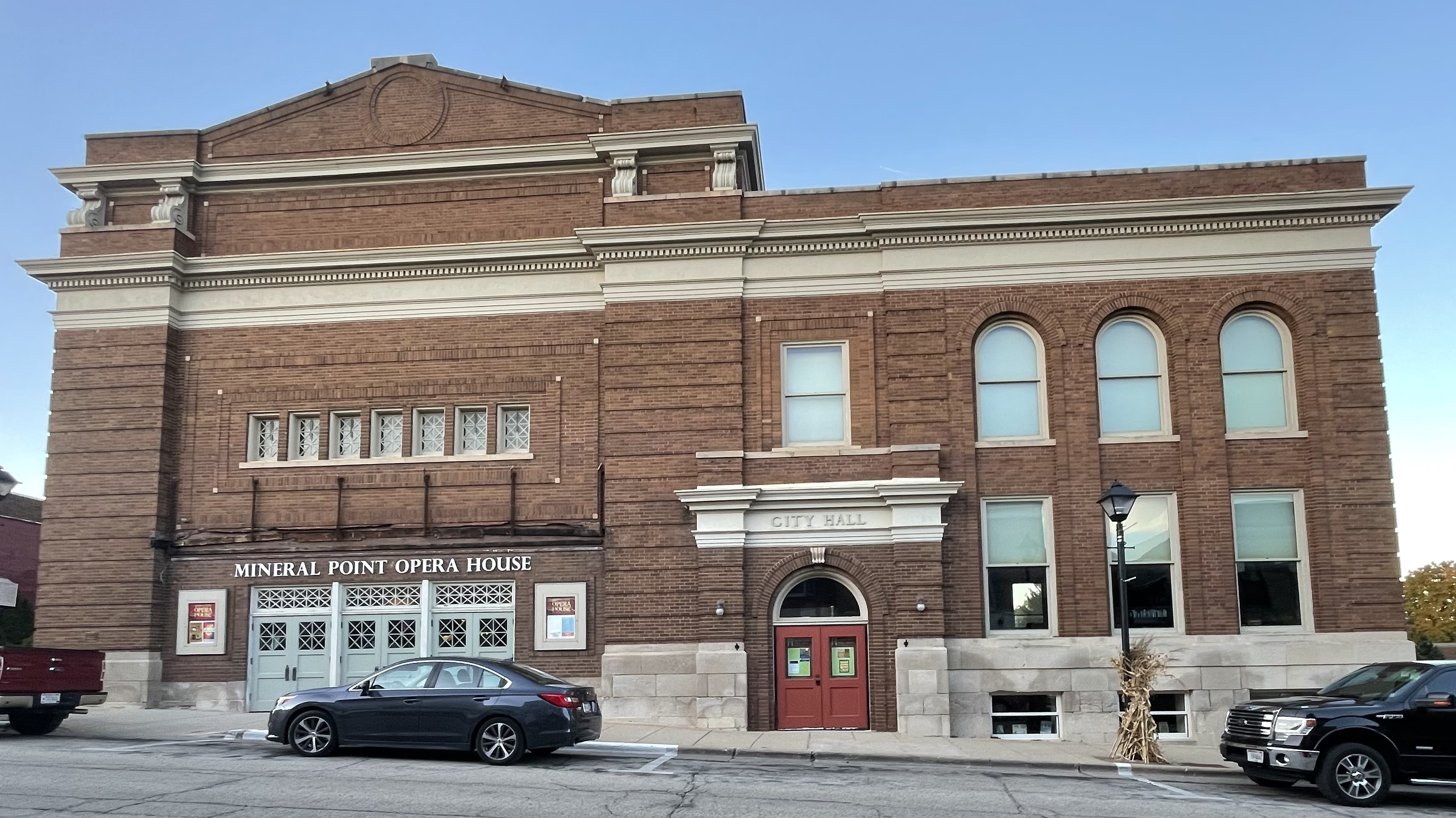
Mineral Point City Hall and Opera House

The first European settlement at Mineral Point began in 1827. One of the first settlers to the area was Henry Dodge and his family who settled a few miles away from Mineral Point. During the following year, large quantities of galena, or lead ore, were discovered around the settlement in shallow deposits. Lead had many uses at the time, and settlers began to flock to the region hoping to make a living by extracting the easily accessible mineral. Lead deposits extended throughout an area that also included Dubuque, Iowa and Galena, Illinois, but Mineral Point became the center of lead mining operations within the bounds of present-day Wisconsin (then part of Michigan Territory). By 1829, the region's growing population led to the creation of Iowa County, which included all of the lead mining lands within the territory. Mineral Point was established as the county seat later that year. During the Black Hawk War of 1832, residents of Mineral Point built Fort Jackson to protect the town from a possible attack. The young settlement's importance was further confirmed in 1834 when it was selected as the site of one of two federal land offices responsible for distributing public land to settlers within the area that now encompasses Wisconsin.

When the Wisconsin Territory was created in 1836, Mineral Point hosted the inauguration of the first territorial governor, Henry Dodge, and the territorial secretary, John S. Horner. During the ceremony, a design by Horner was officially recognized as the Great Seal of Wisconsin Territory. It displayed an arm holding a pickaxe over a pile of lead ore, demonstrating the importance of Mineral Point's early mining economy to the new territory. A census conducted in the months after the inauguration showed that Iowa County had 5,234 inhabitants, making it the most populous county in the Wisconsin Territory east of the Mississippi River.

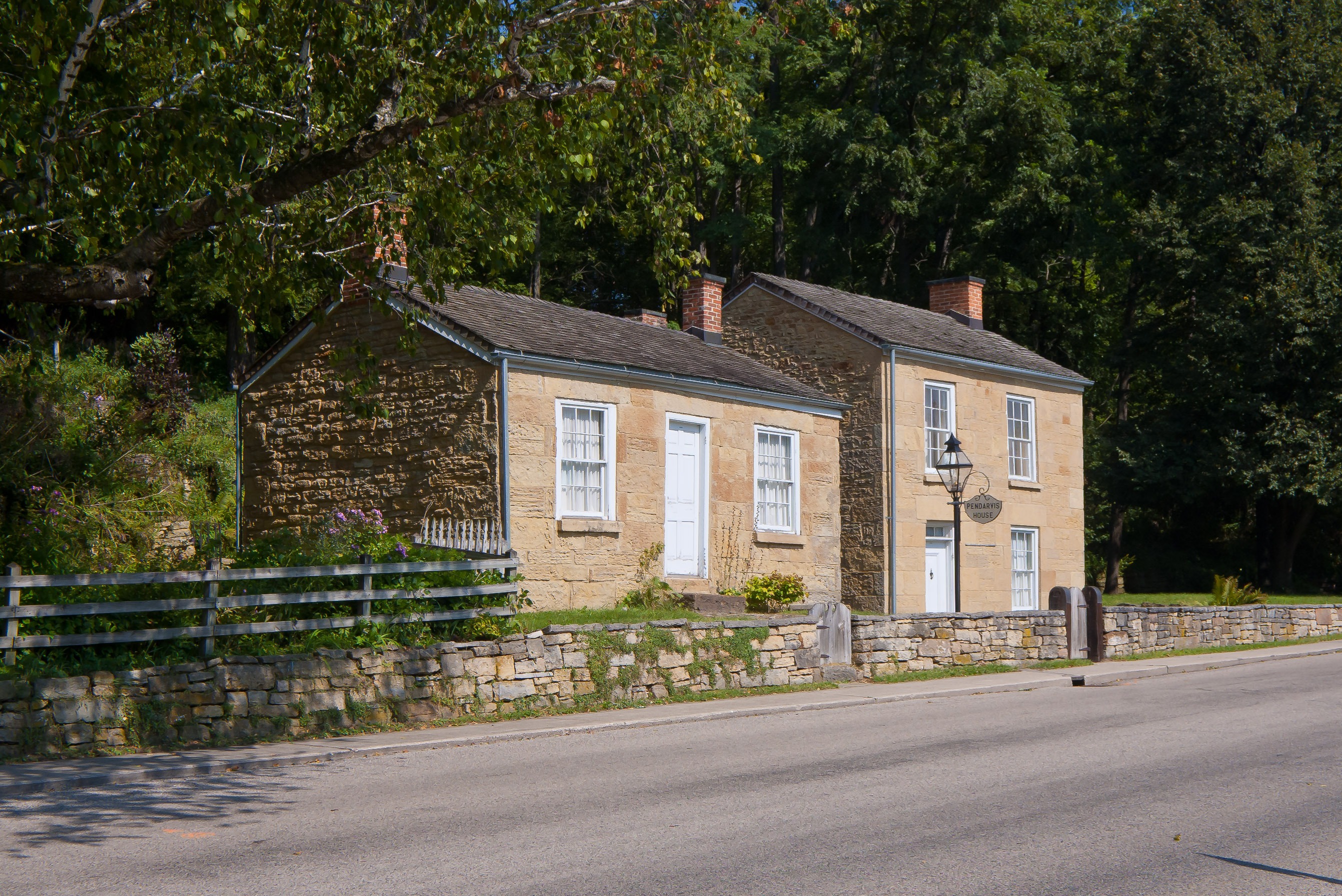
Pendarvis House (left) and Trelawny House (right) at the Pendarvis Historic Site

Mineral Point remained an important lead mining center during the 1840s. Although the most easily accessible lead deposits on the surface were being exhausted by this time, new immigrants began to arrive with more refined techniques for extracting ore. The largest group came from Cornwall, which had been a mining center for centuries. Experienced Cornish miners were attracted to the lead mining opportunities in Mineral Point, and by 1845 roughly half of the town's population had Cornish ancestry. The original dwellings of some of these early Cornish immigrants have been restored at the Pendarvis Historic Site in Mineral Point. Lead continued to be produced in abundant quantities by the Cornish miners, and in 1847, the Mineral Point Tribune reported that the town's furnaces were producing 43,800 pounds (19,900 kg) of lead each day.

Mining activity in Mineral Point began to decline in the following years. In 1848, the same year that Wisconsin achieved statehood, gold was discovered in California. Many experienced miners left Mineral Point to look for gold, and in all, the town lost 700 people during the California Gold Rush. While the lead industry in Mineral Point continued into the 1860s, the town never recovered its former importance.

In November 1858, the residents of Iowa County voted to move the county seat to nearby Dodgeville by a majority of 350. Mineral Point contested this election, accusing some residents of Dodgeville of corruption, and asserting that the law enabling the election was not sufficiently publicised. The case was elevated to the Wisconsin Supreme Court, and Judge Byron Paine delivered the proceeding opinion in favour of Mineral Point on July 11, 1859, following which the residents of Mineral Point fired a cannon towards Dodgeville in celebration. An intense rivalry was harbored between the two towns, and a renewed election took place on April 2, 1861, during which a majority again voted to move the county seat to Dodgeville, where it remains today.

As lead mining declined in Mineral Point, zinc mining and smelting became important new industries. Zinc ore was discovered with increasing frequency near the bottoms of old lead mines. The Mineral Point Zinc Company was founded in 1882, and by 1891 it was operating the largest zinc oxide works in the United States at Mineral Point. Zinc mining and processing continued on a large scale until the 1920s.

In 1897, Robert M. La Follette gave his "The danger threatening representative government" speech in Mineral Point.

In the 1930s, resident Robert Neal, together with his partner Edgar Hellum, aimed to preserve some of the history of the Cornish miners' and settlers' stone structures. Over the next decades, they bought and restored buildings, and turned one into a popular Cornish restaurant attracting tourists. They had both studied art and worked to attract other artists to move to the area. These buildings are now the Pendarvis Historic Site.

== Geography ==
According to the United States Census Bureau, the city has a total area of 3.08 square miles (7.98 km^{2}), all land.

Mineral Point lies within the Driftless Area.

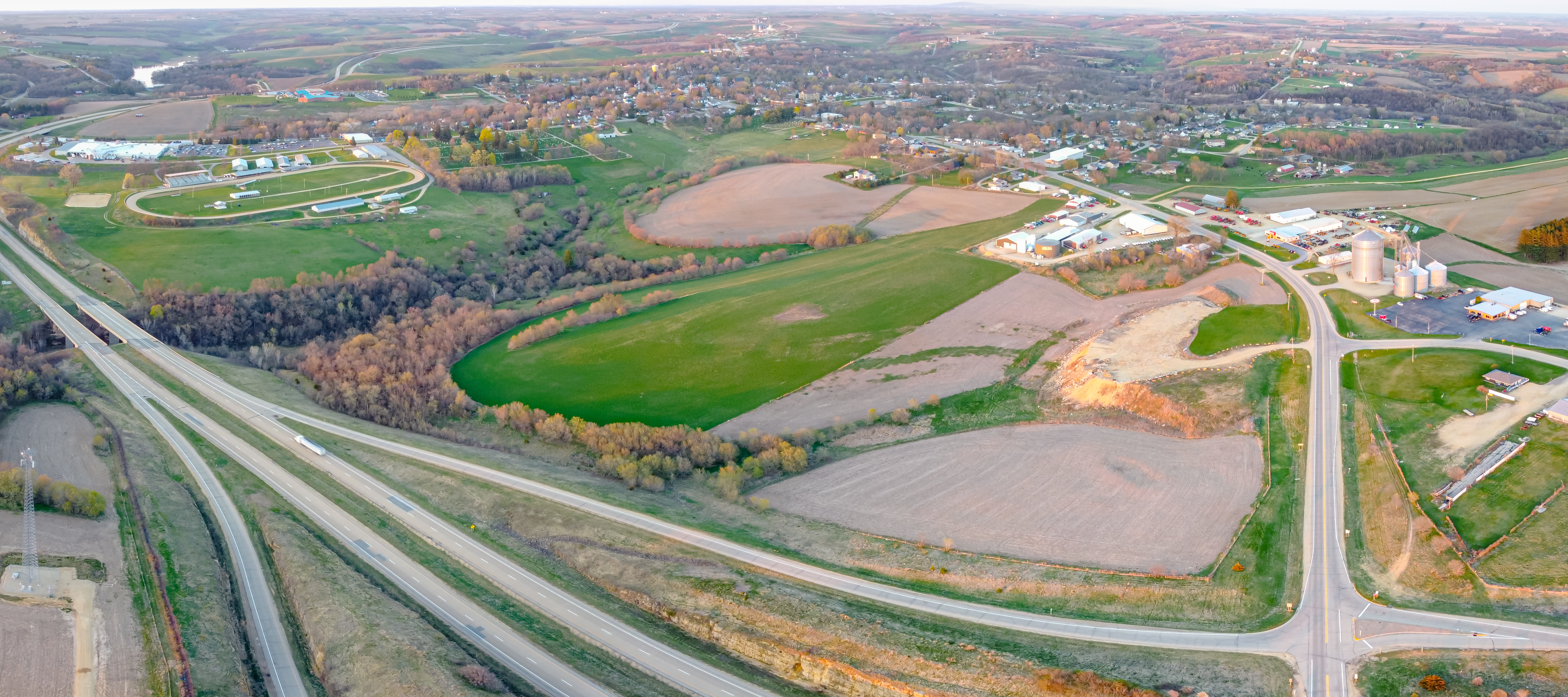
US-151 and Business 151 junction

== Demographics ==
Historical population
Census	Pop.	Note	%±
1860	2,389		—
1870	3,275		37.1%
1880	2,915		−11.0%
1890	2,694		−7.6%
1900	2,991		11.0%
1910	2,925		−2.2%
1920	2,569		−12.2%
1930	2,274		−11.5%
1940	2,275		0.0%
1950	2,284		0.4%
1960	2,385		4.4%
1970	2,305		−3.4%
1980	2,259		−2.0%
1990	2,428		7.5%
2000	2,617		7.8%
2010	2,487		−5.0%
2020	2,581		3.8%
U.S. Decennial Census

=== 2020 census ===
As of the census of 2020, the population was 2,581. The population density was 839.1 inhabitants per square mile (324.0/km^{2}). There were 1,322 housing units at an average density of 429.8 per square mile (165.9/km^{2}). The racial makeup of the city was 95.4% White, 0.5% Asian, 0.5% Black or African American, 0.5% from other races, and 3.1% from two or more races. Ethnically, the population was 1.8% Hispanic or Latino of any race.

=== 2010 census ===
As of the census of 2010, there were 2,487 people, 1,147 households, and 648 families residing in the city. The population density was 854.6 inhabitants per square mile (330.0/km^{2}). There were 1,278 housing units at an average density of 439.2 per square mile (169.6/km^{2}). The racial makeup of the city was 97.9% White, 0.6% African American, 0.1% Native American, 0.8% Asian, 0.1% from other races, and 0.5% from two or more races. Hispanic or Latino of any race were 0.7% of the population.

There were 1,147 households, of which 26.9% had children under the age of 18 living with them, 44.6% were married couples living together, 8.1% had a female householder with no husband present, 3.7% had a male householder with no wife present, and 43.5% were non-families. 37.3% of all households were made up of individuals, and 16.6% had someone living alone who was 65 years of age or older. The average household size was 2.14 and the average family size was 2.83.

The median age in the city was 43.7 years. 21.3% of residents were under the age of 18; 6.8% were between the ages of 18 and 24; 23.5% were from 25 to 44; 30.3% were from 45 to 64; and 18.2% were 65 years of age or older. The gender makeup of the city was 48.0% male and 52.0% female.

== Arts and culture ==
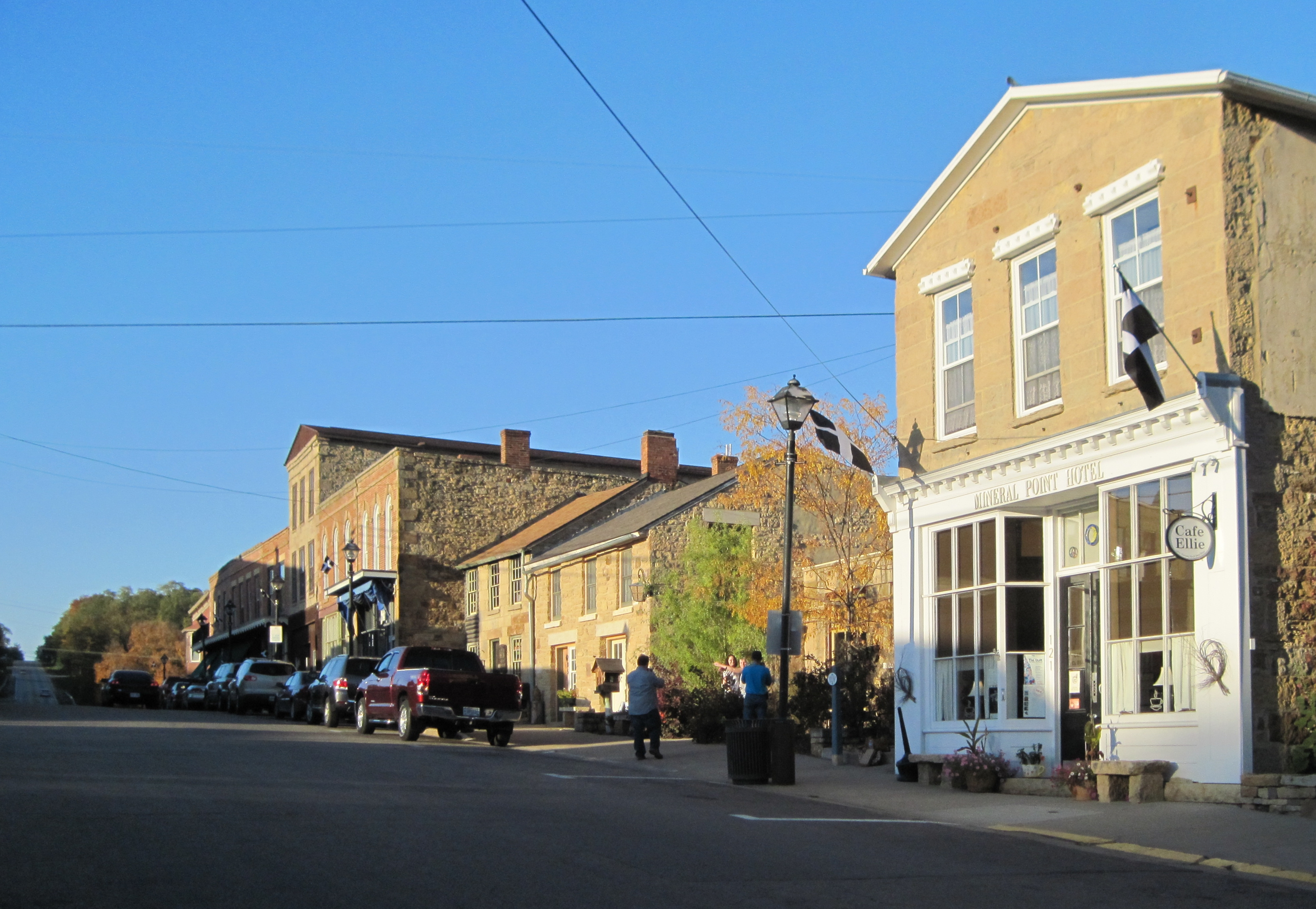
Cornish flags flying from a café on Commerce Street

Much of the city is a historical district on the National Register of Historic Places, including blocks of stone cottages and businesses crafted by the Cornish settlers in the 1800s. A more recent building is the City Hall, built in 1914, which includes the library and the Opera House. The Opera House underwent a $2 million renovation in 2010.

Pendarvis is made up of several 19th-century stone and timber cabins built by Cornish immigrants who came to Mineral Point to mine. Today the site is owned by the Wisconsin Historical Society and serves as a museum of Wisconsin's early lead mining history.

Shake Rag Alley contains seven historic structures near Mineral Point Hill, an outdoor summer theatre and a community-owned arts center. Down the street is Brewery Pottery, an art gallery/studio/museum, located in one of the oldest standing breweries in Wisconsin. Brewery Pottery is open to the public daily, all year round. Other historic sites include Fort Jackson, a frontier fort during the Black Hawk War, and Walker House, one of the oldest inns in the state.

Mineral Point restaurants are known for serving Cornish food, such as pasties and figgyhobbin.

The city is home to an endpoint of the Cheese Country Trail.

== Media ==
The Democrat Tribune is a weekly community newspaper founded in 1849.

== Transportation ==
Iowa County Airport (KMRJ) serves the city, county and surrounding communities.

== Notable people ==
- John Catlin, Acting governor of the Wisconsin Territory
- March F. Chase, head of explosives division, War Industries Board
- Samuel Crawford, Wisconsin Supreme Court
- Amasa Cobb, U.S. representative
- Montgomery Morrison Cothren, Wisconsin legislator and jurist
- George G. Cox, Wisconsin legislator
- Lee Croft, NFL player
- Bill Dyke, former U.S. vice presidential candidate
- Jack Enzenroth, MLB player
- Ansley Gray, Wisconsin state representative
- Charles W. Hutchison, Wisconsin legislator
- David William Hutchison, U.S. Air Force major general
- Mortimer M. Jackson, jurist and diplomat
- William A. Jones, Wisconsin state representative
- Francis Little, Wisconsin state senator
- Allen Ludden, host of the game show Password
- James G. Monahan, U.S. representative
- Abner Nichols, Wisconsin state representative
- Ernie Ovitz, baseball player
- Jabez Pierce, Wisconsin legislator
- William Thomas Rawleigh, Illinois state representative
- Theodore Rodolf, Wisconsin state representative
- William Rudolph Smith, Pennsylvania state representative and senator, Attorney General of Wisconsin
- Calvert Spensley, Wisconsin state representative
- Moses M. Strong, Wisconsin State Assembly Speaker of the House
- John B. Terry, merchant, soldier, pioneer, and Wisconsin territorial legislator
- Cadwallader C. Washburn, U.S. representative, founder of General Mills
- Alexander Wilson, Attorney General of Wisconsin

== Sister city ==
- Redruth, Cornwall, England, United Kingdom
