= List of cases of electoral fraud in the United States =

This is a list of notable cases of electoral fraud in the United States, including elections that were overturned by the United States Congress due to allegations of electoral fraud. The list features instances of voter and ballot fraud, as well as elections where the results were altered by other illegal actions related to the voting process. It does not include cases that are limited to campaign finance violations, defined as a separate category of election crime by the United States government.

== 1780s ==
- A 1916 investigation by Harvard historian Samuel Eliot Morison found that vote totals in the Massachusetts Constitutional Convention of 1779–1780 had been manufactured, and that the Constitution had not in fact been ratified by the required two thirds of voters.

== 1840s ==
- In the 1844 United States presidential election in Louisiana, Democrat James K. Polk won over Whig Henry Clay by 699 votes. The victory was due to Polk's fraudulent 990-vote margin in Plaquemines Parish, where he obtained 1,007 votes compared to just 17 for Clay. There were only 538 total eligible voters in the parish as of 1840, and only 250 people total had voted in the 1840 election.

== 1850s ==
- In the 1854–1857 Kansas Territory elections, pro-slavery forces carried out voter fraud on multiple occasions, including by importing pro-slavery people from Missouri to cast ballots.
  - The 1854 United States House of Representatives election in Kansas Territory results were vacated by Congress in 1856 due to a significant number of illegal votes causing the election of pro-slavery John Wilkins Whitfield.
  - The 1855 and 1857 Kansas territorial legislature elections were impacted by significant electoral fraud. The 1857 election was annulled by Governor Robert J. Walker, with Walker instead certifying the election of anti-slavery Free-Stater candidates.
  - Mass voter fraud also affected a 1857 referendum ratifying the pro-slavery Lecompton Constitution. In a subsequent 1858 referendum, the Lecompton Constitution was defeated by a wide margin.
- In the 1855 Wisconsin gubernatorial election, the Wisconsin Supreme Court overturned the victory of incumbent Democrat William A. Barstow over Republican Coles Bashford due to fraud, which included results being canvassed from townships where nobody lived.
- In the 1855 United States House of Representatives election in New Mexico Territory, José Manuel Gallegos defeated Miguel Antonio Otero by 99 votes. Significant irregularities were revealed, including that Gallegos, a Catholic priest, had rounded up underage boys to vote and swear they were eligible, with the promise that he would absolve them of their sins. Otero successfully contested the election.
- In the 1857 Minnesota gubernatorial election, the Minnesota Democratic Party won by utilizing falsified results supplied by the party-owned Dakota Land Company, which reported 99.1% of votes delivered to be for the Democratic candidate, Henry Sibley.
- In the 1850s, Know Nothing Party officials rigged elections in cities such as Louisville, Kentucky, New Orleans, Louisiana and Baltimore, Maryland through methods that included taking control of voting wards, stealing ballot boxes and violently intimidating immigrant voters.

== 1860s ==
- In the 1860 United States presidential election in New York, the Democratic Tammany Hall machine committed voter fraud against Republican nominee Abraham Lincoln, with significant portions of registered voters in some New York City wards being fake. Lincoln nonetheless won the state. Fraud also occurred in New Jersey, Pennsylvania and Rhode Island.
- In the 1864 United States presidential election in New York, seven agents appointed by New York governor Horatio Seymour to collect votes from soldiers were arrested for impersonating military officers and forging soldier names and signatures in order to illegally record their votes.
- In the 1868 United States presidential election, violence by white Democrats against Black Republicans in Louisiana and Georgia severely decreased the number of votes received by Republican nominee Ulysses S. Grant, to the point where he received zero votes in St. Landry Parish, Louisiana despite the Republican gubernatorial candidate earlier that year receiving 2,500 votes. The Louisiana State Legislature voted to invalidate the state's electoral votes as a result.
- In the 1868 United States presidential election in New York, Tammany Hall machine boss William M. Tweed admitted the organization had purposefully caused the election returns from New York City to be delayed in order for them to overcome the totals from upstate. Tammany Hall also naturalized 65,000 people in courtrooms they controlled in the months prior in order to get them to vote.

== 1870s ==
- In the 1870 United States House of Representatives elections in Arkansas, John Edwards won in the 3rd district, but was removed after a congressional investigation found that fraudulent votes had caused his victory over challenger Thomas Boles.
- In the 1876 United States presidential election between Republican Rutherford B. Hayes and Democrat Samuel J. Tilden, voter fraud was widespread on both sides, with South Carolina notably reporting an impossible 101 percent turnout. Violence and intimidation against Black Republican voters also occurred in Southern states. In four contested states, Republicans and Democrats filed separate tallies favoring their respective candidates. The election was bitterly contested and ultimately decided by the Congress-appointed Electoral Commission in favor of Hayes.

== 1880s ==
- In the 1880 United States House of Representatives elections in South Carolina, 5th district challenger Robert Smalls successfully contested the election of incumbent George D. Tillman, which was marked by voter fraud as well as voter intimidation. Tillman won the seat back in 1882 using similar tactics, and remained in office.
- In the 1884 United States House of Representatives election in New Mexico Territory, Tranquilino Luna defeated Francisco A. Manzanares due to fraud, which included him winning Valencia County 4,279 to 0, and significant "alphabetical voting", where returns were falsified based on the alphabetical registry list. The seat was subsequently awarded to Manznares.
- In the 1888 United States presidential election, there was evidence of voter fraud in some states that favored Republican Benjamin Harrison, particularly in his home state of Indiana. Public backlash contributed to the nationwide implementation of secret ballots.
- In the 1888 United States House of Representatives elections in Arkansas, John M. Clayton lost to Clifton R. Breckinridge in the 2nd district by 846 votes after a ballot box with a large majority of Clayton votes was stolen. Clayton was assassinated the following year while challenging the election, but was posthumously declared the winner by Congress.
- In the 1888 United States House of Representatives elections in Maryland, Barnes Compton was initially elected in the 5th district, but his opponent Sydney E. Mudd successfully contested the election the following year due to fraud.

== 1890s ==
- In the 1892 Alabama gubernatorial election, evidence suggests that Reuben Kolb's loss to incumbent Thomas Goode Jones was decided by fraud. This included ballot boxes being stolen, votes being swayed by bribery or threats, and counties in the Black Belt announcing results before later changing them. Kolb was not allowed by law to contest the results, and lost the gubernatorial race in 1894 under similar circumstances.
- In the 1896 Texas Legislature election, an African-American candidate elected in a Robertson County district despite stolen ballot boxes and voter intimidation was not declared the winner by election officials, and when he threatened to contest the election he was shot in the arm by County Judge O.D. Cannon.
- In the 1898 North Carolina elections, voter fraud and intimidation contributed to Democratic victories across the state. In the 9th district congressional race, Republican Richmond Pearson successfully contested the victory of Democrat William T. Crawford.

== 1900s ==
- In the Alabama Constitution of 1901 ratification referendum, widespread electoral fraud in the Black Belt caused the ratification to pass. The constitution remained in effect until 2022.
- In the 1905 Louisville mayoral election, the victory of Paul C. Barth over Joseph T. O'Neal Sr. was annulled in 1907 by the Kentucky Court of Appeals due to evidence of illegal voter registration, ballot tampering and voter intimidation.
- In the 1905 New York City mayoral election, there was voter fraud against William Randolph Hearst linked to the Tammany Hall machine. Hearst lost to George B. McClellan Jr. by 3,472 votes.
- In the 1909 United States Senate election in Illinois, William Lorimer was elected by state legislators, but the Senate determined he had engaged in vote buying and voted to expel him in 1912.

== 1910s ==
- In the 1910 Adams County, Ohio elections, vote buying was rampant to the extent that judge Albion Z. Blair disenfranchised nearly 1,700 voters – a quarter of the electorate – as a penalty for their participation.
- In a 1914 Terre Haute, Indiana local election, a federal court found mayor Donn M. Roberts and several other local government officials guilty of conspiracy to corrupt the election. It was notable as one of the first cases where a federal court had jurisdiction over local elections.
- In the 1918 United States House of Representatives elections in Pennsylvania, Patrick McLane was declared the winner in the 10th district; a congressional committee determined in 1921 that "wholesale fraud" had cheated John R. Farr out of the election, and McLane was unseated.

== 1920s ==
- In the 1926 United States Senate election in Pennsylvania, there was tampering of ballots that affected the vote count in favor of William Scott Vare against his opponent William B. Wilson. While the fraudulent ballots were not greater than the margin of victory, Vare was ultimately not seated by Congress due to campaign finance improprieties.

== 1930s ==
- In the 1930s, U.S. senator and governor Huey Long ran a political machine throughout Louisiana with significant voter fraud.
  - In the 1930 United States Senate election in Louisiana, which Long won, indications of electoral fraud were ubiquitous. According to Long biographer Richard White, "the official record indicated that voters marched to the polls in alphabetical order".
  - In the 1932 United States Senate election in Louisiana, Long's lieutenants allegedly promised the families of inmates that their loved ones would be freed if they voted for Long's endorsed candidate.
  - In 1933, Orleans Parish District Attorney Eugene Stanley indicted 513 New Orleans election officials for fraud. Three were convicted of falsifying election returns, but after Long as governor pushed the legislature to pass a bill stating prosecutors would have to prove someone committed electoral fraud "willingly", charges against the other 510 were dropped.
- In the 1934 United States Senate election in Missouri, there was electoral fraud in the Democratic primary connected to Kansas City machine boss Tom Pendergast. There was also fraud related to Pendergast in 1936, after which the FBI investigated. By mid-1938, 242 people had either pled guilty or been convicted at trial for their involvement.
- In a 1935 St. Louis, Missouri referendum on funding the future Gateway Arch National Park, there was evidence that fraud had led to the referendum passing. The St. Louis Post-Dispatch published an exposé that included affidavits from people who said they hadn't voted.

== 1940s ==
- In the 1941 United States Senate special election in Texas, according to a book by Lyndon B. Johnson biographer Robert A. Caro, Johnson lost due to the manipulation of election results from alcohol industry lobbyists, who sought to elect his rival, governor Pappy O'Daniel. O'Daniel was put over the top thanks to late vote returns.
- In the 1942 United States Senate election in Kentucky, fraud in Harlan County in favor of incumbent Happy Chandler led to 71 defendants either being found guilty at trial or pleading guilty or no contest. It also led to a United States Supreme Court ruling that ballot stuffing violated federal criminal law.
- In the 1946 Georgia gubernatorial election, a box of 58 votes for write-in candidate Herman Talmadge was unearthed in Telfair County, Talmadge's home county. The votes allowed Talmadge to place second, making him eligible to be chosen by the Georgia General Assembly as governor in a contingent election. An investigation by Atlanta Journal journalist George Goodwin uncovered fraudulent votes of people who were dead, had moved away or never existed. The discovery contributed to the Three governors controversy secession crisis in the state.
- In the 1948 United States Senate election in Texas, according to Robert A. Caro, Johnson won his Democratic primary against Coke R. Stevenson due to electoral fraud, which included county officials casting ballots for absent voters and changing vote tally numbers. Johnson won the primary by 87 votes, and the Texas Democratic Party executive committee upheld his victory by a vote of 29 to 28. The event became known as the Box 13 scandal, as six days after polls had closed, 202 additional votes were added to the totals for Precinct 13 of Jim Wells County: 200 for Johnson and two for Stevenson.
- In the 1948 United States Senate special election in Louisiana, Russell B. Long won the Democratic primary by 11,000 votes over Robert F. Kennon. In 1952, he admitted that he had accepted "stolen votes" from Plaquemines Parish party boss Leander Perez. He subsequently backtracked on this statement, though also said "I am sure I would have beaten [Kennon] anyway". Long had received 85% of Plaquemines Parish votes in the primary. He went on to win the general election and served as a U.S. Senator until 1987.
- In the 1948 United States presidential election in Kentucky, Edward F. Prichard Jr., former general counsel for the Democratic National Committee, was found guilty of ballot stuffing.

== 1960s ==
- Some historians believe the 1960 United States presidential election in Illinois, which John F. Kennedy won over Richard Nixon, was decided by fraud. Multiple judges and one independent prosecutor determined that the election was fair, although historian Robert Dallek, who wrote biographies on both candidates, concluded the Chicago machine run by mayor Richard J. Daley "probably stole Illinois from Nixon". According to Politico in 2016, "over a half century after the fact, it's impossible to judge what really happened." Nixon lost the Electoral College and conceded the election the following morning, although he encouraged recount efforts in Illinois and other states, which were shut down after setbacks in several key court hearings. In 1962, three Chicago precinct workers were convicted of vote tampering in the election.
- In the 1962 Georgia State Senate election, future President Jimmy Carter successfully contested his Democratic primary in court after voter fraud in favor of his opponent was revealed in Quitman County. The fraud was exposed by Atlanta Journal reporter John Pennington.

== 1970s ==
- In 1972, a Chicago Tribune investigation uncovered more than 1,000 instances of electoral fraud in Chicago on a March 21, 1972 primary day. The investigation resulted in at least 30 election workers being found guilty and sentenced. The newspaper won a Pulitzer Prize as a result. There was evidence of "ghost voters" who did not live in the area, forged signatures on ballot applications, and a significant number of Republican election judges who were recruited by Democratic party bosses.
- In the 1976 United States House of Representatives elections in Louisiana, 20 poll commissioners in St. Bernard Parish pled guilty to casting 432 fraudulent votes for Rick Tonry in the 1st district Democratic primary, with him winning by 184 votes. There were allegations of additional voter irregularities both linked to Tonry and his opponent, James A. Moreau. Tonry resigned his seat in May 1977, four months after the 95th Congress was sworn in.

== 1980s ==
- Between 1968 and 1984, eight Democratic primary elections in Brooklyn, New York, were marked by repeated fraud according to the findings of a grand jury. The fraud included multiple voting by teams of political workers with fake voter registration cards.
- In the 1982 Illinois elections, there were 62 indictments and 58 convictions for election fraud, many involving precinct captains and election officials. A grand jury concluded that 100,000 fraudulent votes had been cast in Chicago. Authorities found fraud involving vote buying and ballots cast by others in the names of registered voters. The case was prosecuted in November 1982 by U.S. Attorney Dan K. Webb.
- In the 1987 Chicago mayoral election, two reviews conducted by the Chicago Board of Election Commissioners and an election watchdog group headed by Webb found that tens of thousands of ballots were fraudulently cast in the Democratic primary.

== 1990s ==
- In the 1993 Hialeah, Florida mayoral election, a judge ruled that so many ballots had been cast from a retirement home housing schizophrenics and drug addicts that the election had to be re-run.
- In the 1994 Pennsylvania State Senate election, a federal judge invalidated a race in Philadelphia after finding that the Democratic candidate William G. Stinson had stolen the election through absentee ballot fraud. Republicans took control of the State Senate as a result of the ruling. Democratic members of the Philadelphia Board of Elections were also implicated in the conspiracy.
- In the 1994 Greene County, Alabama elections, a scheme to request and turn in large numbers of fraudulent absentee ballots was uncovered. Eleven defendants were convicted, including the county commission chairwoman. More than 2,000 improperly witnessed absentee ballots were also disqualified by courts, affecting the result of the 1994 Alabama Supreme Court election.
- In the 1996 United States House of Representatives elections in California, the Republican majority on the House Oversight Committee claimed to have found 748 illegal votes cast in the 46th district race between Republican Bob Dornan and Democrat Loretta Sanchez, including 624 by noncitizens. Sanchez won by 979 votes, so it would not have affected the outcome, and the House voted to dismiss Dornan's challenge in February 1998. The findings were highly contested and disputed by the Democratic minority on the committee, who pointed out that about half of those who registered as noncitizens were citizens by the time they cast their ballots. No indictments were brought by a grand jury after a yearslong criminal investigation into Hermandad, an immigrant rights group at the center of fraud allegations. The California Secretary of State did not press charges, concluding in April 1998 that the noncitizens identified had registered in error and not from criminal intent.
- In the 1996 Dodge County, Georgia elections, a state court threw out the results for sheriff and county commissioner due to significant irregularities. There was evidence of vote buying in the county, as well as illegal voting by convicted felons.
- In the 1997 Miami mayoral election, a judge invalidated the victory of Xavier Suarez over Joe Carollo for "a pattern of fraudulent, intentional and criminal conduct" in the casting of absentee ballots.

== 2000s ==
- In 2002, 2004 and 2006, eight prominent Clay County, Kentucky politicians were involved in a scheme to gain control of the local board of elections and fix election outcomes. The group notably included a former U.S. circuit judge and former county school superintendent.
- In the 2003 East Chicago, Indiana mayoral election, the Indiana Supreme Court invalidated the Democratic primary citing "a widespread and pervasive pattern" of absentee ballot fraud. Forty-six people, mainly city workers, were found guilty in a wide-ranging conspiracy to purchase votes through the use of absentee ballots, which included the coercion of sick people and people with limited English skills.
- In the late 2000s, several workers of voter registration group ACORN were found guilty of or pled guilty to the registration of fake voters.

== 2010s ==
- Between 2005 and 2014, Tarrant County, Texas woman Rosa Maria Ortega illegally voted five times as a noncitizen. Ortega stated she believed her green card gave her the right to vote. She was initially sentenced to eight years in prison and later granted parole.
- In 2008 and 2010, Georgia Republican party official Brian Pritchard was found to have illegally voted nine times while serving a sentence for a felony conviction. Pritchard was sentenced in 2024.
- In 2009 and 2010, Massachusetts Democratic state representative Stephen Stat Smith illegally cast absentee ballots for voters who were ineligible or unaware of ballots being cast in their names. Smith pled guilty in 2012 and resigned his seat in 2013.
- In 2012, Indiana Secretary of State Charles P. White was convicted of multiple voter fraud-related charges, causing him to lose his position.
- In the 2012 United States House of Representatives elections in Florida, Jeffrey Garcia, chief of staff to 26th district Democratic incumbent Joe Garcia, was charged with orchestrating a scheme to illegally request nearly 2,000 absentee ballots. Garcia pled guilty to a misdemeanor.
- In the 2012 Massachusetts House of Representatives election, Republican candidate Enrico "Jack" Villamaino pled guilty to absentee ballot fraud, after prosecutors found he and his wife had changed more than 280 voters' registrations to make them eligible to vote in the Republican primary, and forged the voters' names on absentee ballot requests.
- In 2012, Cincinnati, Ohio poll worker Melowese Richardson made national headlines for using her position to vote twice.
- In the 2014 and 2016 Philadelphia elections, former Democratic congressman Michael "Ozzie" Myers was found to have bribed election workers to stuff ballot boxes in local races. Myers pled guilty in 2022 and was sentenced to 2 1/2 years in prison.
- In the 2014 Magoffin County, Kentucky judge-executive election, a federal judge invalidated the election due to corruption and vote buying make it impossible to determine who won. Three people were also found guilty of conspiring to buy votes on behalf of local office candidates.
- In the 2018 United States House of Representatives elections in North Carolina, there was a fraudulent ballot harvesting scheme undertaken by McCrae Dowless, a campaign operative working for Republican congressional candidate Mark Harris in North Carolina's 9th congressional district. Mark Harris initially won the Republican primary by 905 votes, but multiple inconsistencies – only 19 percent of ballot requesters were registered Republicans, for example, but 61 percent of absentee voters selected Harris – and credible reports from workers hired by Dowless led to an investigation, refusal by the North Carolina State Board of Elections to certify Harris, a new election (in which Harris did not participate), and the arrest of Dowless and several other Republican party operatives for ballot harvesting and ballot tampering.
- In 2018, Southfield, Michigan poll worker Sherikia Hawkins was accused of covering up a failure to count 193 absentee ballots. She pled no contest to misconduct in 2022.

== 2020s ==
- In the 2020 Iowa elections, Kim Phuong Taylor, wife of Republican Iowa congressional candidate Jeremy Taylor, illegally filled out or submitted voter registrations and absentee ballots and was convicted in 2024 of 52 counts of voter fraud.
- In the 2020 Ohio elections, Edward Snodgrass, a Republican township trustee in Porter Township, Ohio, pled guilty to forging his deceased father's signature on a ballot.
- In the 2020 Carrollton, Texas mayoral election, candidate Zul Mirza Mohamed was found to have forged mail-in ballot applications under residents' names and had ballots sent to a virtual mailbox he leased. He was convicted of 106 counts in 2024.
- In the 2021 Millbourne, Pennsylvania mayoral election, candidate Md Nurul Hasan and two accomplices were found to have conspired to register non-Millbourne residents and submit absentee ballots on their behalf.
- In 2022, former Atlantic City Council President Craig Callaway set up a fraudulent scheme to illegally harvest and submit mail-in ballots on behalf of unsuspecting voters. Callaway was sentenced to two years in prison in 2025.
- In the 2021 municipal elections in Rensselaer County, New York, Republican elections commissioner Jason Schofield pled guilty to illegally using the personal information of local voters to request and submit 12 absentee ballots without their knowledge.
- In the 2023–24 Bridgeport, Connecticut mayoral election, a judge ordered the Democratic primary to be re-run after ruling that there was enough evidence of ballot stuffing to throw the results into doubt. According to The New York Times, illegal ballot manipulation is not uncommon in Bridgeport elections, and has included apartment residents being pressured to apply for absentee ballots they were not entitled to. Incumbent mayor Joseph Ganim, who had won the initial primary, also won the do-over primary and the general election.
- Between June 2023 and June 2024, a software error at the New Jersey Motor Vehicle Commission caused around 6,600 noncitizens in the state to wrongly be registered to vote. Almost 400 of the noncitizens went on to illegally cast ballots.
- In November 2025, the mayor of Coldwater, Kansas Jose Ceballos was charged with voting illegally as a noncitizen. Ceballos stated he had voted in elections since 1991 and thought he was allowed to vote as a permanent resident.
