= Edward George Ryan =

19th century American judge

The Honorable Edward G. Ryan
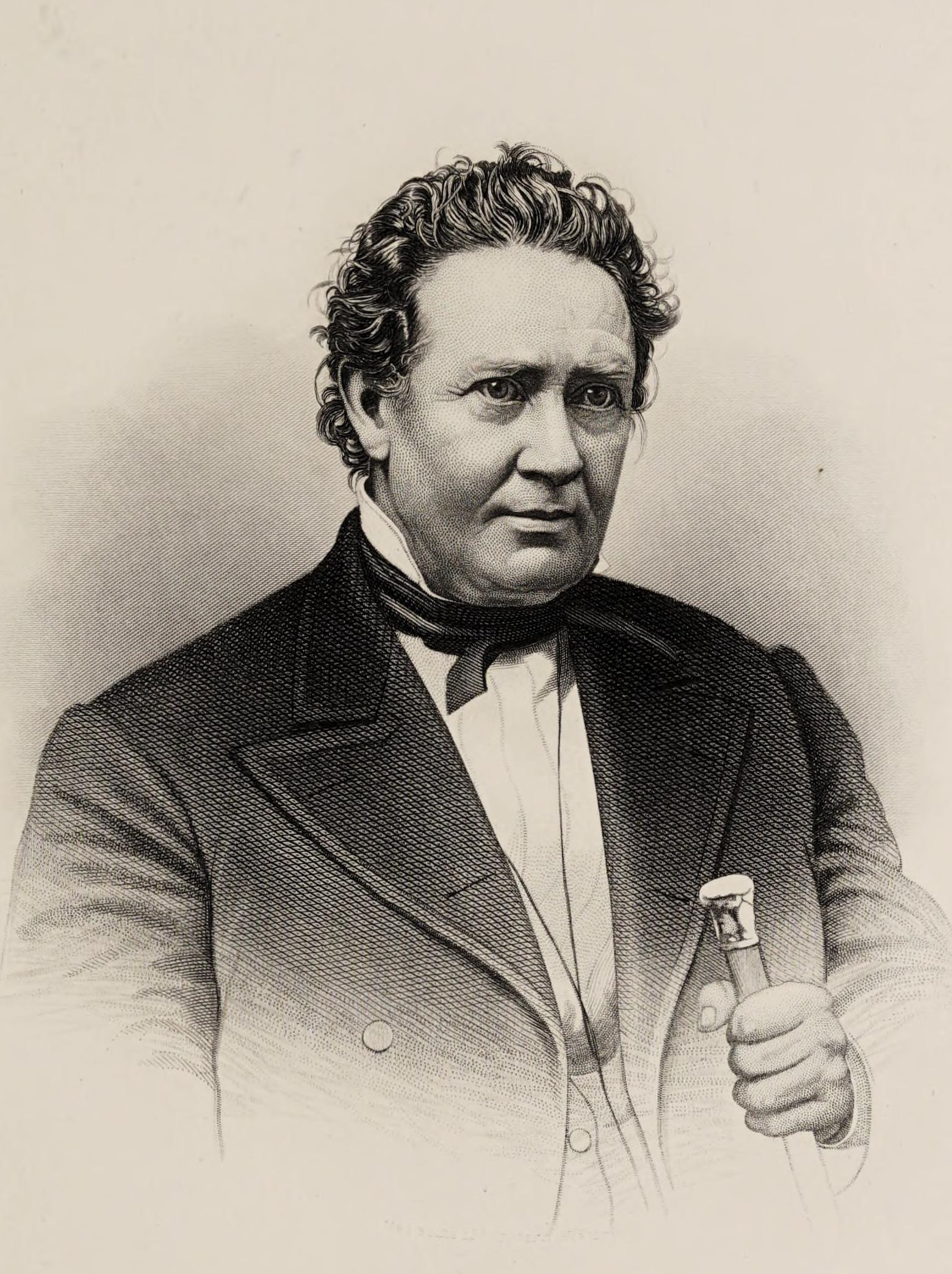

5th Chief Justice of the Wisconsin Supreme Court
- In office June 17, 1874 – October 19, 1880
- Appointed by: William Robert Taylor
- Preceded by: Luther S. Dixon
- Succeeded by: Orsamus Cole

Justice of the Wisconsin Supreme Court
- In office June 17, 1874 – October 19, 1880
- Appointed by: William Robert Taylor
- Preceded by: Luther S. Dixon
- Succeeded by: John B. Cassoday

Personal details
- Born: Edward George Ryan; November 13, 1810 County Meath, Ireland, UK
- Died: October 19, 1880 (aged 69) Madison, Wisconsin, U.S.
- Resting place: Forest Home Cemetery, Milwaukee, Wisconsin
- Party: Democratic
- Spouses: Mary Graham (m. 1842; died 1847) Caroline Willard (m. 1850; div. 1872)
- Children: 1 with Mary Graham; 7 with Caroline Willard
- Parents: Edward Ryan (father); Abby (Keogh) Ryan (mother)

Edward George Ryan (November 13, 1810 – October 19, 1880) was an Irish American immigrant, lawyer, and Wisconsin pioneer. He was the 5th chief justice of the Wisconsin Supreme Court; he was initially appointed by Democratic governor William Robert Taylor in 1874 and retained office until his death in 1880. Ryan was a leading Democrat in Wisconsin during his era, and was the Democratic nominee for U.S. Senate in 1863. Prior to his appointment to the Supreme Court, Ryan was city attorney of Milwaukee for four years.

Earlier in his career, Ryan participated in several noteworthy cases as an attorney. He served as prosecutor for the U.S. government in the fugitive slave cases against abolitionist Sherman Booth in the 1850s. He prosecuted the impeachment against Wisconsin circuit court judge Levi Hubbell in 1853, and also argued the case of Republican gubernatorial candidate Coles Bashford in his lawsuit to overturn the original results of the 1855 Wisconsin gubernatorial election.

== Early life and career ==
Born in County Meath, Ireland, Ryan emigrated to the United States in 1830, originally settling in New York City. In 1836, Ryan became a United States citizen and was admitted to the New York bar. He then moved to Chicago, Illinois, where he married his first wife, Mary Graham. In Chicago, Ryan practiced law, edited a newspaper, and worked as a city attorney.

In 1842, he moved north to Racine, in the Wisconsin Territory, and continued his law practice. Ryan was elected to the first Wisconsin Constitutional Convention in 1846, though the constitution produced by that convention was rejected by Wisconsin voters. Politically, Ryan was a Democrat, and was a delegate for Wisconsin to the 1848 Democratic National Convention, which nominated Lewis Cass.

His wife, Mary, died in 1847. The following year, Ryan moved his law practice to Milwaukee.

== Legal career in Wisconsin ==
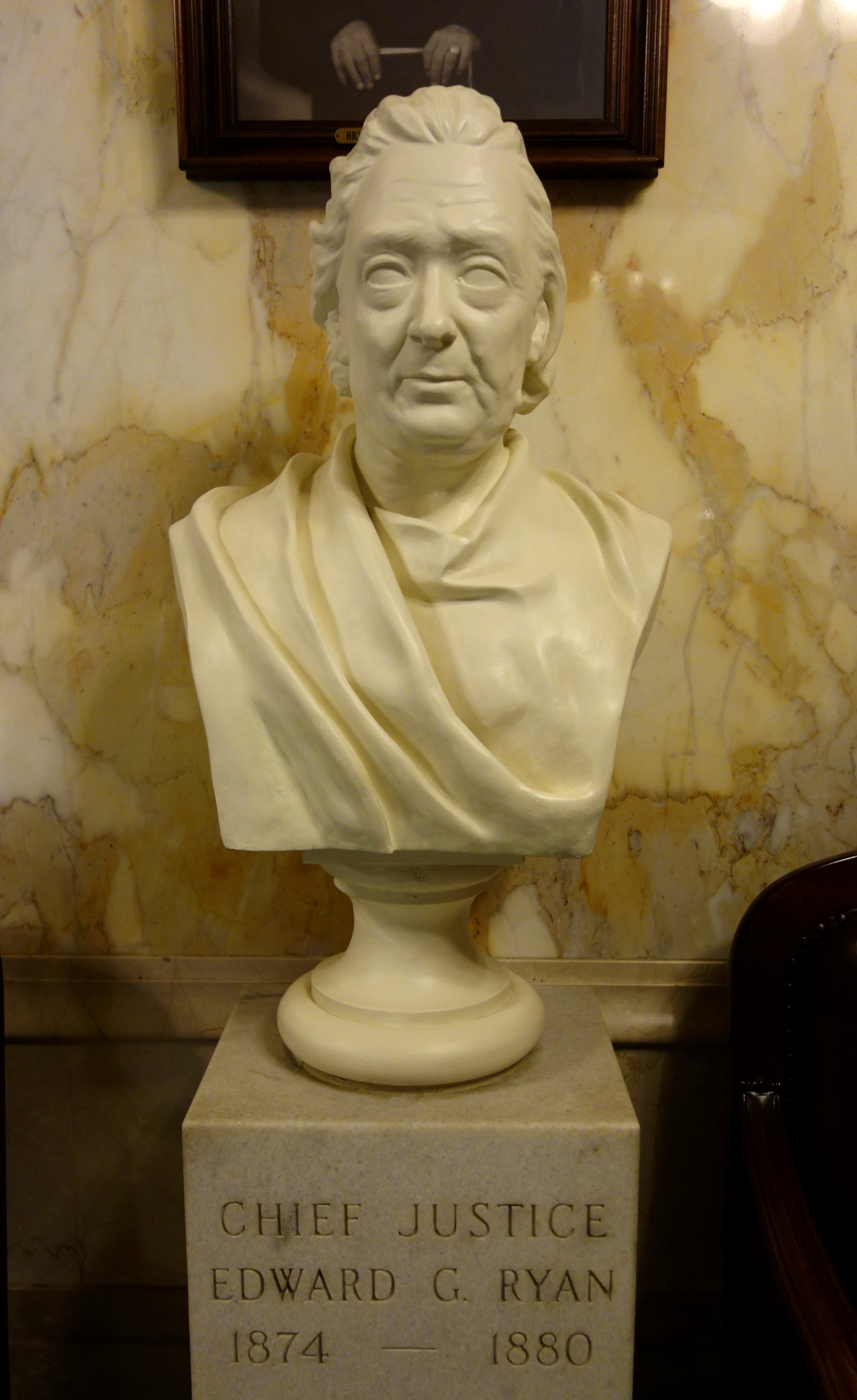
Bust of Justice Ryan at the Wisconsin State Capitol in Madison, Wisconsin.

During his years as a lawyer, Ryan was involved in several notable cases in Wisconsin history.

In 1853, he was the prosecutor in the impeachment of Wisconsin circuit court judge Levi Hubbell, on charges of corruption. Hubbell was acquitted by the Wisconsin Senate, though, later in life, he would be forced to resign his role as a U.S. Attorney due to similar corruption charges. Ryan was notoriously bad-tempered, and his prosecution of the case against Hubbell was described as viciously personal, and motivated by personal grievances.

In 1854 and 1855, Ryan was the attorney for the United States in the case of Ableman v. Booth, where he prosecuted abolitionist Sherman Booth for assisting a runaway slave in violation of the Fugitive Slave Act of 1850. In the Booth case, Ryan was opposed by fellow future-justice, Byron Paine. Paine prevailed at the Wisconsin Supreme Court, but the decision was later overturned by the Supreme Court of the United States. Booth would ultimately be pardoned by U.S. President James Buchanan.

After the contested gubernatorial election of 1855, Ryan represented Republican candidate Coles Bashford in his attempt to overturn the apparent victory of incumbent Governor William A. Barstow. In the case Atty. Gen. ex rel. Bashford v. Barstow, Ryan prevailed and the Wisconsin Supreme Court threw out a number of fraudulent votes, awarding the election to Bashford.

In 1870, Ryan was elected City Attorney of Milwaukee, and held that office until his appointment to the Wisconsin Supreme Court.

In 1874 Chief Justice Luther S. Dixon resigned from the Wisconsin Supreme Court. Governor William Robert Taylor appointed Ryan to finish his term. He was re-elected in 1875 and would remain Chief Justice until his death in 1880.

== Family and personal life ==
Ryan's married his first wife, Mary Graham, in December 1842. They had one child, Hugh, before her death in 1847.

Ryan married his second wife, Caroline Willard, in 1850. They had seven children together. But Ryan's quick temper led to problems in the marriage, and she left him in 1872, taking their children with her.

Ryan died at his home in Madison on October 19, 1880, and was buried at Forest Home Cemetery in Milwaukee.

Legal offices
Preceded by Luther S. Dixon	Justice of the Wisconsin Supreme Court; 1874 – 1880	Succeeded by John B. Cassoday
Preceded by Luther S. Dixon	Chief Justice of the Wisconsin Supreme Court; 1874 – 1880	Succeeded by Orsamus Cole
