= 1857 Minnesota gubernatorial election =

- October 13, 1857
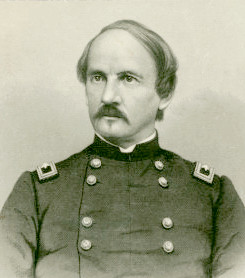

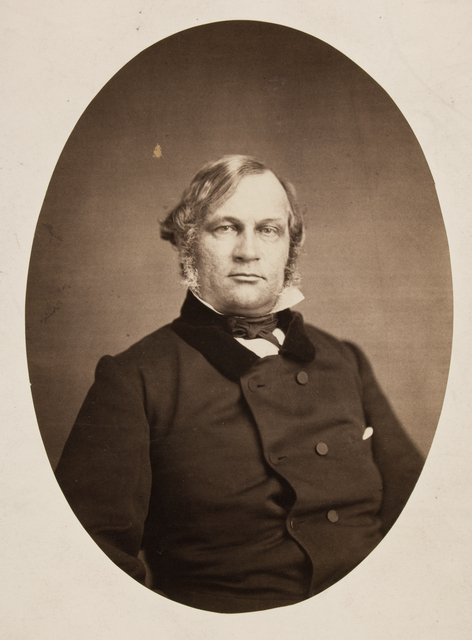
Nominee	Henry Hastings Sibley	Alexander Ramsey
Party	Democratic	Republican
Popular vote	17,790	17,550
Percentage	50.34%	49.66%
- County results Sibley: 50–60% 60–70% 70–80% 80–90% >90% Ramsey: 50–60% 60–70% 70–80% >90% Unknown/no vote
Governor before election
Samuel Medary
as Territorial Governor
Charles L. Chase as Acting Governor
Democratic
Elected Governor
Henry Hastings Sibley
Democratic

The 1857 Minnesota gubernatorial election was held on October 13, 1857, to elect the inaugural governor of Minnesota. Democrat Henry Hastings Sibley was elected governor by only 240 votes, the closest gubernatorial election in Minnesota until 1962. A Democrat would not be elected governor of Minnesota again until 1898.

== Candidates ==
- Alexander Ramsey, former territorial governor (Republican)
- Henry Hastings Sibley, member of the Minnesota Territorial Legislature (Democrat)

== Campaigns ==
Ramsey had previously served as territorial governor. In 1853, upon his term's completion, he stated he would not run for any public office again. He made an exception to this rule to briefly serve as mayor of St. Paul, before returning to private life. However, upon the Republican State Convention nominating him unanimously on September 10, 1857, he was convinced to leave retirement, and accepted the nomination.

On September 15, 1857, Sibley was named the Democratic nominee at the Democratic State Convention.

== Disputed results ==
Early returns showed Ramsey in the lead. On October 26, the Republicans declared victory. However, on October 28, the Democrat-owned Dakota Land Company reported returns from southwestern counties. With these new returns, Sibley won 221 out of 223 votes - 99.1% of votes. The Dakota Land Company had entirely fabricated the results, as none of any of the counties it had "settled" had a population of anyone except the employees of the company itself. The votes were fraudulent. A board was created to investigate claims of corruption, but the board was led by Samuel Medary, Joseph R. Brown, and other Dakota Land Company directors. The board eliminated a few votes, but declared Democrat Henry Hastings Sibley the victor by only 240 votes.

== Results ==
Minnesota gubernatorial election, 1857
Party	Candidate	Votes	%
Democratic	Henry Hastings Sibley	17,790	50.34
Republican	Alexander Ramsey	17,550	49.66
Total votes		35,340	100

== See also ==
- 1855 Wisconsin gubernatorial election
- List of cases of electoral fraud in the United States
