= Jason Downer =

19th century American lawyer and judge, justice of the Wisconsin Supreme Court

The Honorable Jason Downer
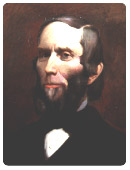

Associate Justice of the Wisconsin Supreme Court
- In office November 15, 1864 – September 11, 1867
- Appointed by: James T. Lewis
- Preceded by: Byron Paine
- Succeeded by: Byron Paine

Wisconsin Circuit Court Judge for the 2nd Circuit
- In office Fall 1869 – December 31, 1869
- Appointed by: Lucius Fairchild
- Preceded by: Arthur MacArthur Sr.
- Succeeded by: David W. Small

Personal details
- Born: September 9, 1813 Sharon, Vermont, U.S.
- Died: September 1, 1883 (aged 69) Milwaukee, Wisconsin, U.S.
- Resting place: Forest Home Cemetery, Milwaukee
- Party: Republican; Whig (before 1854)
- Spouses: Eliza Jane Dunbar (m. 1847, died); Alcy Eliza Miner (m. 1864–1883)
- Children: none
- Education: Dartmouth College
- Profession: Lawyer

Jason Downer (September 9, 1813 – September 1, 1883) was an American lawyer, judge, and Wisconsin pioneer. He was a justice of the Wisconsin Supreme Court from 1864 to 1867. Earlier in his life, he was one of the earliest editors of the Milwaukee Sentinel in 1845, but quit after a half year to return to his legal career. He was the namesake of Milwaukee-Downer College and Downer Avenue in Milwaukee, Wisconsin.

== Early life ==
Downer was born in Sharon, Vermont, in September 1813. He was raised and worked from his youth on his father's farm until age 19, when he entered Kimball Union Academy in New Hampshire. He subsequently attended Dartmouth College from 1834 until graduating in 1838.

Shortly after graduating, he moved to Louisville, Kentucky, where he read law and was soon after admitted to the bar. In November 1842, he came to the Wisconsin Territory. He settled in the village of Milwaukee and began a law practice there. Milwaukee would remain his primary residence for the rest of his life.

== Milwaukee legal career ==
In February 1845, Downer purchased a share of the ownership of the Milwaukee Sentinel, becoming a partner of John S. Fillmore. Downer began working as editor of the paper, which had just begun issuing a daily edition the prior December. He only remained with the paper for seven months, however, resigning and selling his share of ownership in September 1845 to Rufus King.

For the next 15 years, Downer distinguished himself as an attorney in Milwaukee and a member of the Whig political minority in the state. In 1853, he became a witness in the impeachment trial of Wisconsin circuit court judge Levi Hubbell, testifying to Hubbell's financial involvement in some cases he presided over.

== Judicial career ==
In the Fall of 1864, Wisconsin Supreme Court justice Byron Paine resigned from the court to accept a commission in the Union Army in the midst of the American Civil War. Several candidates applied for appointment to succeed Paine, but the governor, James T. Lewis, chose Downer. Downer was described at the time as highly qualified and impartial.

Downer stood for election the next spring and won a full term on the court without facing opposition. Downer did not enjoy judicial duties, however, and resigned from the court in September 1867. This also allowed Byron Paine—by then returned from the war—to reclaim his seat, as the governor appointed him to succeed Downer.

Downer's most noteworthy act as a member of the court was likely his opinion in the 1866 case of Gillespie v. Palmer, in which African American Milwaukee resident Ezekiel Gillespie sued for his right to vote in Wisconsin, based on an 1849 Wisconsin referendum in which the majority of votes were in favor of extending voting rights to African Americans. At the time, the referendum was considered to have failed, because although the majority of those voting on the referendum were in favor, a large number of voters at that election simply did not vote on the referendum question, meaning it did not obtain the majority of all votes cast at the election. Downer agreed with Gillespie and his attorney, Byron Paine, writing for the majority that the success or failure of a referendum should only count the votes for and against that specific measure, and should not factor in the number of votes for other candidates or questions on the ballot. Although the case revolved around a technical issue, Downer's decision had the effect of extending voting rights to all African Americans in the state.

He also wrote the court's opinion in the case of Druecker v. Salomon, in which Druecker sued former Wisconsin governor Edward Salomon for having him arrested for resisting the draft during the Civil War. Downer held that the draft was lawfully constituted and that conspiracy to resist the draft was akin to levying war against the United States, and thus the governor was within his rights to arrest the plaintiff for insurrection.

After leaving the Supreme Court, Downer was briefly induced to return to the bench in 1869 when he was appointed to fill the last few months of Arthur McArthur's term as Wisconsin circuit court judge for the 2nd circuit. Otherwise, he devoted the rest of his life to his legal practice.

Jason Downer died on September 1, 1883, at his home in Milwaukee. His body was interred at Milwaukee's historic Forest Home Cemetery.

== Personal life and legacy ==
Jason Downer was the second of seven children born to Solomon Downer and his wife Martha (née Huntington). The Downers were descended from Robert Downer, who emigrated from Salisbury, England, to the Massachusetts Bay Colony in the 1630s.

Downer married twice but had no known children. His first wife was Eliza Dunbar, who he married on December 28, 1847. After her death, he married Alcy Eliza Miner on February 2, 1864. His second wife survived him.

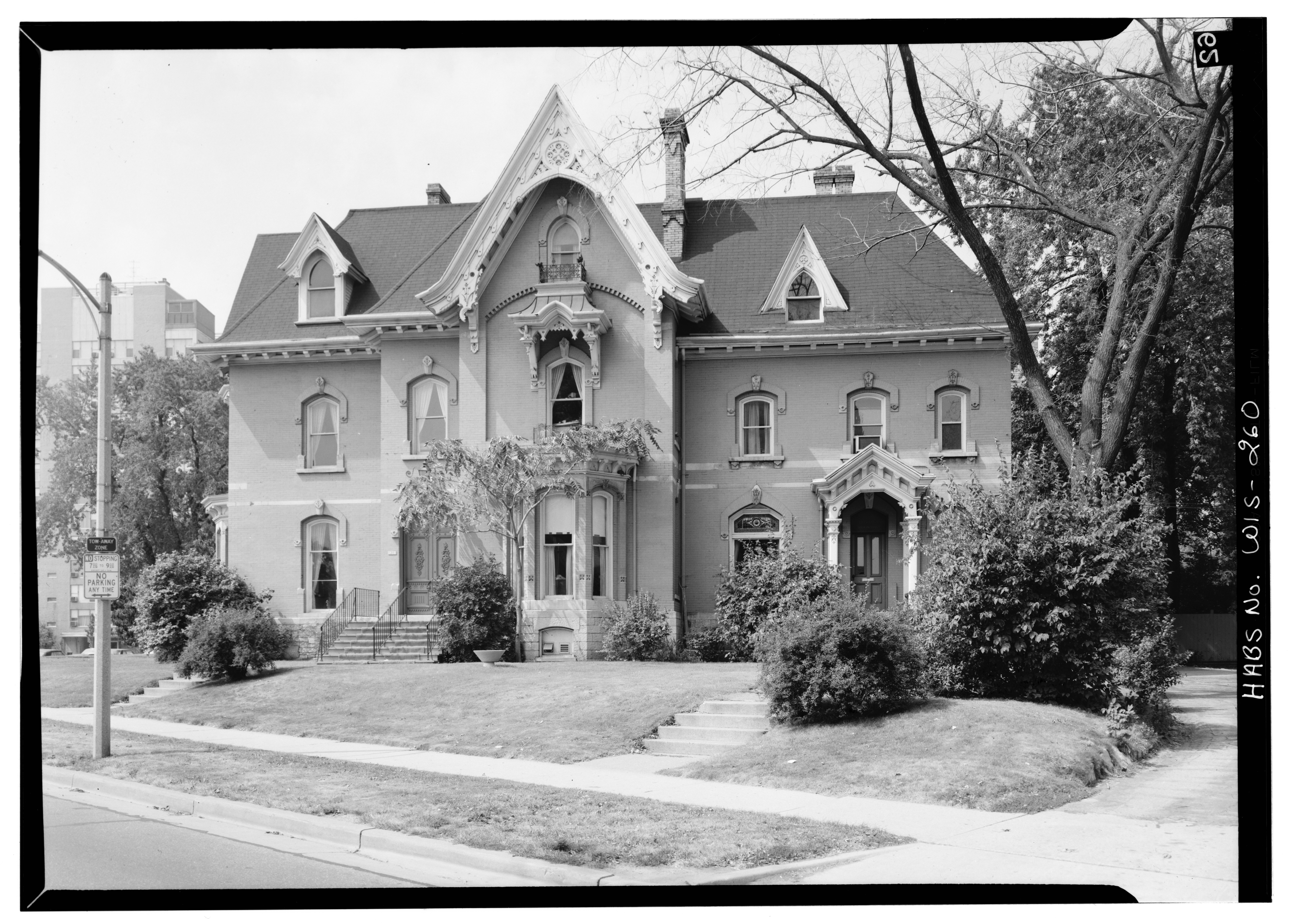
Downer's Milwaukee home

When Downer died, he left an estate worth about $250,000 ($8.64 million in 2025 dollars). He gave away about $150,000 to friends and institutions, and left the rest to his wife, Alcy. Alcy made a $5,000 donation to the Wisconsin Female College at Fox Lake, on the condition that they name it Downer College, in memory of her husband. The school eventually became Milwaukee-Downer College and spawned the Milwaukee-Downer Seminary. Milwaukee-Downer College was ultimately integrated into Lawrence University.

Downer's former home in Milwaukee (whose address is now 1201 N. Prospect Ave.) is now part of the First Ward Triangle Historic District in the National Register of Historic Places, and was recently restored. It is described as one of Milwaukee's finest preserved Victorian buildings.

Downer Avenue in Milwaukee was named in his honor in 1898. Several additional Milwaukee landmarks bear the "Downer" name—such as the Downer Woods neighborhood and the Downer Theatre—but those are due to their association with Downer Avenue, not specifically for Downer himself.

Legal offices
| Preceded by Arthur MacArthur Sr. | Wisconsin Circuit Court Judge for the 2nd Circuit; Fall 1869 – December 31, 1869 | Succeeded by David W. Small |
| Preceded by Byron Paine | Associate Justice of the Wisconsin Supreme Court; November 15, 1864 – September 11, 1867 | Succeeded by Byron Paine |
