= Arthur MacArthur Sr. =

American politician (1815–1896)

Associate Justice of the Supreme Court of the District of Columbia
- In office July 15, 1870 – April 1, 1887
- Appointed by: Ulysses S. Grant
- Preceded by: Seat established
- Succeeded by: Martin V. Montgomery

4th Governor of Wisconsin
- In office March 21, 1856 – March 25, 1856
- Lieutenant: Himself
- Preceded by: William A. Barstow
- Succeeded by: Coles Bashford

5th Lieutenant Governor of Wisconsin
- In office January 6, 1856 – January 4, 1858
- Governor: William A. Barstow; Coles Bashford
- Preceded by: James T. Lewis
- Succeeded by: Erasmus D. Campbell

Wisconsin Circuit Judge for the 2nd Circuit
- In office January 1, 1858 – November 22, 1869
- Preceded by: Alexander Randall
- Succeeded by: Jason Downer

Personal details
- Born: Arthur McArthur; January 26, 1815 Glasgow, Scotland
- Died: August 26, 1896 (aged 81) Atlantic City, New Jersey, U.S.
- Resting place: Rock Creek Cemetery
- Party: Democratic (before 1865); Republican (1865–1896)
- Spouse(s): Aurelia Belcher (m. 1844; died 1864) Mary Willcut
- Children: Arthur Jr. • Frank
- Relatives: Douglas MacArthur (grandson)
- Education: Wesleyan University

Arthur MacArthur Sr. (January 26, 1815 – August 26, 1896) was a Scottish American immigrant, lawyer, politician, and judge. He was the fifth lieutenant governor of Wisconsin, serving from 1856 to 1858, and during that term he served for 4 days in March 1856 as the fourth governor of Wisconsin, due to the dispute over the results of the 1855 gubernatorial election. After his term as lieutenant governor, he served a decade as Wisconsin circuit court judge for Milwaukee and Waukesha counties (1858–1869). He was then appointed an associate justice of the Supreme Court of the District of Columbia, serving from 1870 to 1887.

After his judicial service, MacArthur remained in Washington, D.C. He served as trustee, president of the board of regents, and chancellor of National University. He also served as president of the Society for Prevention of Cruelty to Animals and Children.

He was the father of U.S. Army General Arthur MacArthur Jr. and grandfather of General Douglas MacArthur. MacArthur is the modern spelling used by his descendants, but in documents from his own time, his name was spelled McArthur.

== Education and career ==
Arthur MacArthur was born on January 26, 1815, in Glasgow, Scotland. His parents were both MacArthurs from the western Scottish Highlands, but his father died before his birth. His mother, Sarah, remarried to Alexander Meggett, and, in 1828, the family migrated to the United States, settling near Uxbridge, Massachusetts.

MacArthur attended Uxbridge and Amherst, but left school to help the family during the depression of 1837. He eventually graduated from Wesleyan University, in Connecticut, in 1840. He studied law in New York, and was admitted to the New York Bar in 1841. He also became interested in politics while in New York, joining the Democratic Party.

While in New York, he met and fell in love with Aurelia Belcher, who convinced him to move to Massachusetts. He entered private practice in Springfield, Massachusetts, and, in 1843, was a public administrator in Hampden County. Around 1844, he married Aurelia, and, with financial assistance from her father, expanded his law practice. He successfully practiced law in New York and Massachusetts for several years, and, in 1849, moved with his wife and son to Milwaukee, in the new state of Wisconsin.

== Wisconsin public offices ==
In Wisconsin, MacArthur continued practicing law from 1849 to 1851, and resumed his interest in politics with the Democratic Party in the city. In 1851, he became City Attorney for Milwaukee. In the 1855 election, MacArthur was the Democratic Party nominee for Lieutenant Governor of Wisconsin, running alongside incumbent Governor William A. Barstow. He defeated Republican Charles Sholes, of Kenosha, to become the 5th Lieutenant Governor of the state.

=== 1855 election dispute ===
The 1855 election, however, also produced a controversy with the apparent re-election of Barstow by a mere 157 votes. Barstow's Republican opponent, Wisconsin state senator Coles Bashford, claimed fraud and challenged the results. On January 7, 1856, both Bashford and Barstow were sworn in as governor of Wisconsin in separate ceremonies.

The outgoing attorney general, George Baldwin Smith, filed quo warranto proceedings to have Barstow removed, and the case Atty. Gen. ex rel. Bashford v. Barstow soon reached the Wisconsin Supreme Court. Barstow initially attempted to challenge the jurisdiction of the court over election results, but eventually relented, and, on March 21, 1856, sent his resignation to the Wisconsin Legislature.

MacArthur, therefore, became the acting governor of Wisconsin. Four days later, the Wisconsin Supreme Court unanimously decided in favor of Bashford, ruling that the results from several precincts from remote northern counties appeared fraudulent. MacArthur, though he had at first decided to hold the governor's office regardless of the court's decision, reconsidered and relinquished the governorship to Bashford.

He resumed his duties as lieutenant governor, and officially remained in this position until the end of his term, January 1858.

=== Wisconsin circuit court ===
In 1856, Wisconsin circuit court judge Levi Hubbell had resigned his seat in the 2nd circuit, covering Milwaukee and Waukesha counties. Alexander Randall had been appointed to temporarily fill the seat, but a new election was scheduled for April 1857 to fill the remainder of the term. Randall did not run in the election for a full term; MacArthur, while serving as lieutenant governor, ran for and was elected to the position without opposition, taking office the following year. He was re-elected in 1863 and resigned in the fall of 1869. He took leave from the bench in the fall of 1869 due to his wife's illness, and Judge William P. Lyon of the 1st circuit tended to MacArthur's circuit during those months. He resigned from office effective November 22, 1869, following his wife's death.

== Washington, D.C. ==
=== Federal judicial service ===
MacArthur was nominated by President Ulysses S. Grant on July 15, 1870, to the Supreme Court of the District of Columbia (now the United States District Court for the District of Columbia), to a new Associate Justice seat authorized by 16 Stat. 160. He was confirmed by the United States Senate on July 15, 1870, and received his commission the same day. He served on the court for 17 years, and retired on April 1, 1887.

=== Later life ===
MacArthur remained a prominent member of Washington, D.C., society in his later years. He was a strong supporter of the National University, and served as a trustee, president of the Board of Regents, and Chancellor of the university. He was also President of the Society for Prevention of Cruelty to Animals and Children.

== Family ==
Around 1844, MacArthur married Aurelia Belcher (1819–1864), the daughter of a wealthy industrialist. They had two sons, Arthur Jr., born in Chicopee Falls, Massachusetts, in 1845, and Frank, born in Wisconsin in 1853.

At the outbreak of the American Civil War, Arthur Jr., then sixteen, became passionate about the Union cause. MacArthur appealed directly to President Abraham Lincoln to secure an appointment for Arthur Jr. to the United States Military Academy, but the boy was so eager to join the Union cause, he deferred the academy to volunteer for service. MacArthur assisted his then-seventeen-year-old son in obtaining a commission as an adjutant and first lieutenant in the 24th Wisconsin Infantry Regiment, under Colonel Charles H. Larrabee. Arthur Jr. went on to earn the Medal of Honor for his actions in the Civil War, and pursued a career in the Army, eventually rising to the rank of lieutenant general (three star), and serving as American Governor-General of the Philippines. Arthur Jr. was also the father of American five-star General and World War II hero Douglas MacArthur.

After the death of his wife, Aurelia, MacArthur married Mary E. (Willcut) Hopkins (1824–1899), the widow of Benjamin F. Hopkins.

== Death ==
MacArthur died on August 26, 1896, in Atlantic City, New Jersey.

== Electoral history ==
=== Wisconsin Lieutenant Governor (1855) ===
Wisconsin Lieutenant Gubernatorial Election, 1855
Party	Candidate	Votes	%	±%
General Election, November 6, 1855
Democratic	Arthur MacArthur	38,040	51.96%	−5.66%
Republican	Charles Sholes	35,160	48.03%	
	Scattering	8	0.01%	
Plurality		2,880	3.93%	-11.83%
Total votes		73,208	100.0%	+31.13%
Democratic hold				

== See also ==
- List of United States governors born outside the United States

Party political offices
Preceded by James T. Lewis	Democratic nominee for Lieutenant Governor of Wisconsin; 1855	Succeeded by Erasmus D. Campbell
Political offices
Preceded by James T. Lewis	Lieutenant Governor of Wisconsin; 1856–1858	Succeeded by Erasmus D. Campbell
Preceded by William A. Barstow	Governor of Wisconsin; 1856	Succeeded by Coles Bashford
Legal offices
Preceded by Alexander Randall	Wisconsin Circuit Judge for the 2nd Circuit; January 1, 1858 – November 22, 1869	Succeeded by Jason Downer
Seat established by 16 Stat. 160	Associate Justice of the Supreme Court of the District of Columbia; 1870–1887	Succeeded by Martin V. Montgomery
