= 1865 Wisconsin Supreme Court election =

1863 Wisconsin Supreme Court election
- April 4, 1865
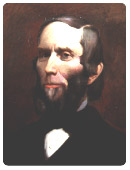
| Candidate | Jason Downer |
| Party | Republican |
| Popular vote | 61,388 |
| Percentage | 99.63% |
Justice before election
Byron Paine
Republican
Elected Justice
Jason Downer
Republican

The 1865 Wisconsin Supreme Court Chief Justice election was held on Tuesday, April 5, 1867, to elect the chief justice of the Wisconsin Supreme Court. Jason Downer was elected unopposed.

1865 Wisconsin Supreme Court Chief Justice election
| Party | Candidate | Votes | % |
|---|---|---|---|
| Republican | Jason Downer | 56,316 | 99.63 |
| | Scattering | 209 | 0.37 |
| Total votes | | 56,525 | 100 |
