= First Ward Triangle Historic District =

- U.S. National Register of Historic Places
- U.S. Historic district
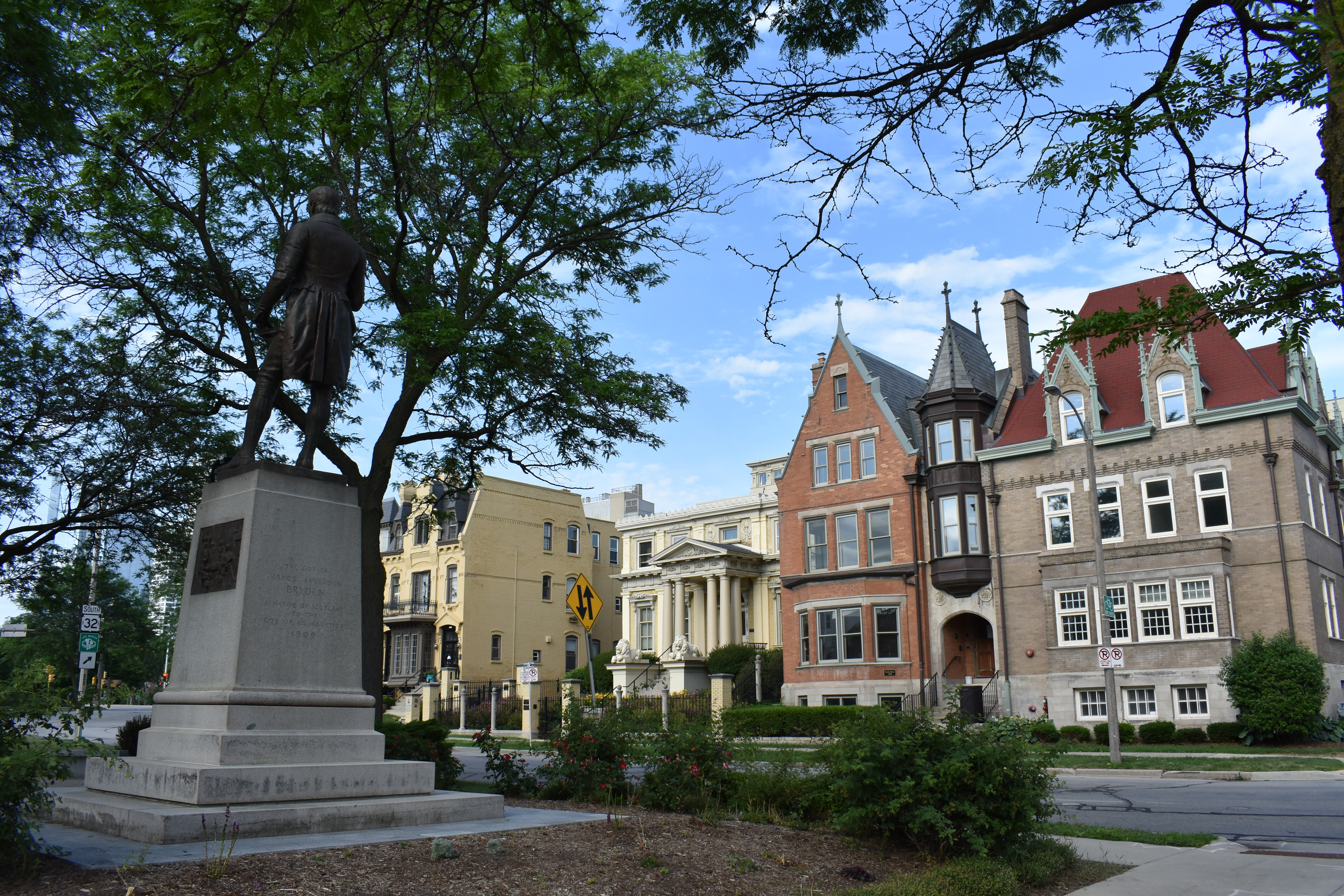
- Statue of Scottish poet Robert Burns and several homes of the First Ward Triangle Historic District
- Location: Milwaukee, Wisconsin
- Coordinates: 43.045772°N 87.89763°W
- Built: 1855–1900
- Architect: Multiple
- Architectural style: Late Victorian, Classical Revival
- NRHP reference No.: 87000489
- Added to NRHP: March 19, 1987

The First Ward Triangle Historic District is a listing in the National Register of Historic Places for a collection of 11 historic residences adjoining a triangular park—Burns Triangle—located in what is now the Yankee Hill neighborhood in downtown Milwaukee, Wisconsin. These upper class residences, many of which are now businesses, were erected between 1855 and 1910 and designed by several leading architects in high style Victorian domestic architecture. The houses are located near where East Knapp St. and East Juneau Ave. meet N. Prospect Ave. and N. Franklin Pl. The district gets its name from Burns Triangle, which the historic houses partially surround. Burns Triangle is a small park named for the bronze statue of Scottish poet Robert Burns erected there in 1909.

== History ==
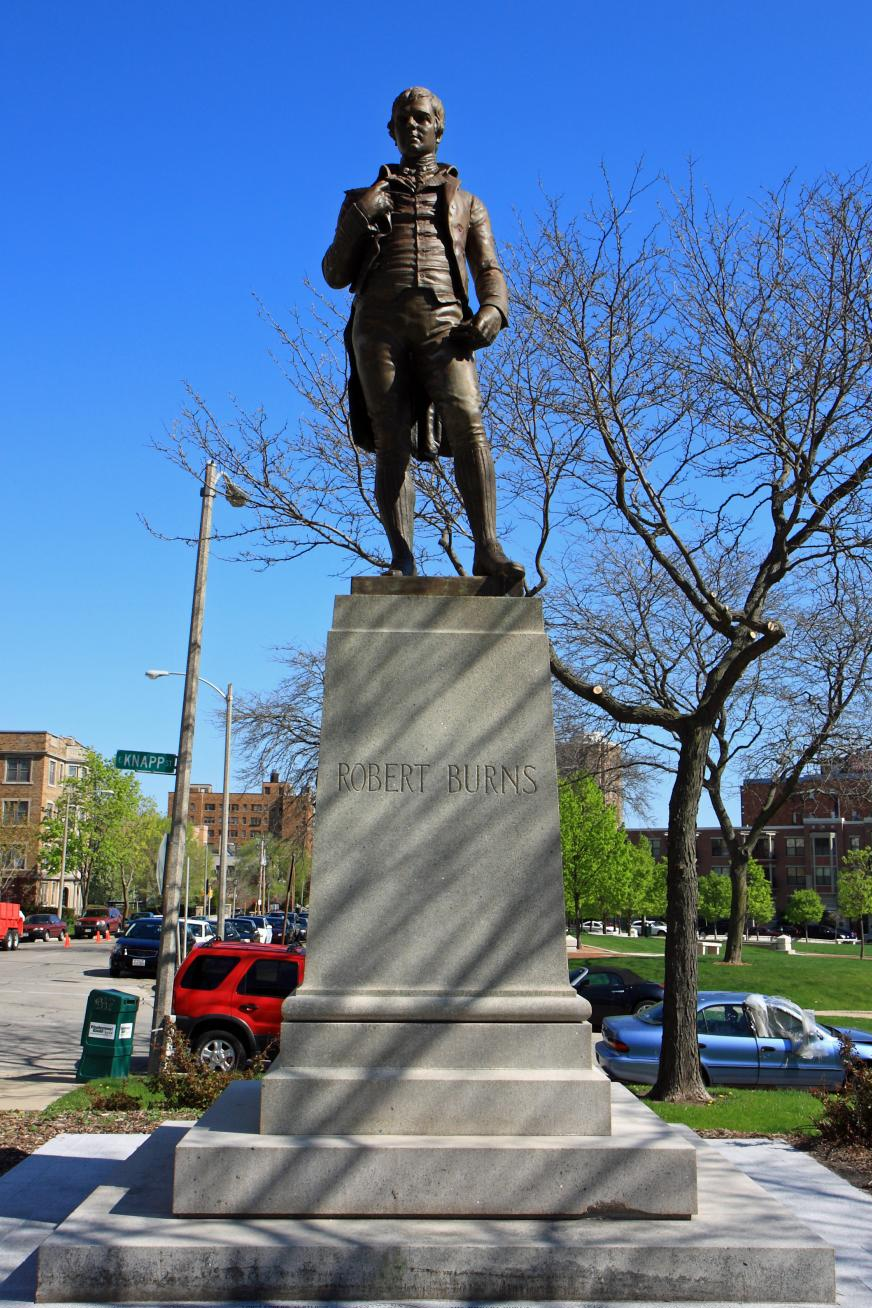
Close up of the statue of Robert Burns.

The district is built on land that was originally part of the area known as "Rogers' Addition", named for James H. Rogers—one of Milwaukee's earliest settlers. The area was platted in 1847.

The oldest house in the historic district is the Edward Diederichs House (1241 N. Franklin Pl.), built in 1855, just nine years after the city of Milwaukee was incorporated. Diederichs was a wealthy German immigrant entrepreneur, and in that early era his classical revival home was unique among Milwaukee's housing stock. The home was designed by one of Milwaukee's first architectural firms, German-trained Mygatt and Schmidtner, the house was inspired by German villas of the early 1800s. The home was later converted for non-residential use, and was at one time the headquarters of the Lynde and Harry Bradley Foundation.

Master builder Stephen A. Harrison designed his own home in the district (1216 N. Prospect Ave.), a Cream City brick Italianate mansion constructed in 1866.

Wisconsin Supreme Court justice Jason Downer commissioned a home at 1201 N. Prospect Ave. in 1874, from architect E. Townsend Mix in the Gothic Revival style. It sits next door to the George and Laura Miller House (1060 E. Juneau Ave.); a wedding gift to Laura from her father, department store owner Timothy Chapman, it is believed to be the work of Chicago architect August Fiedler. Nearby, the Horace Rublee House (1223 N. Prospect Ave.), a cream brick Queen Anne style house was also attributed to E. Townsend Mix; it was built in 1884 for the prolific newspaper editor and Republican partisan. The William Prentiss House (1234 N. Prospect Ave.), a painted cream brick Italianate house, was built in 1874 for former Milwaukee mayor William A. Prentiss.

The Charles Forsythe House (1119 E. Knapp St.) is a wood clapboard house, built in the 1880s. Next door, the Joseph Friedberg House was built in the same time-frame using similar materials, but has had most of its exterior replaced. The Mary B. Hawley and Francis Bloodgood Houses (1249 N. Franklin Pl. & 1135–1139 E. Knapp St.) were both designed by Howland Russel in 1896.

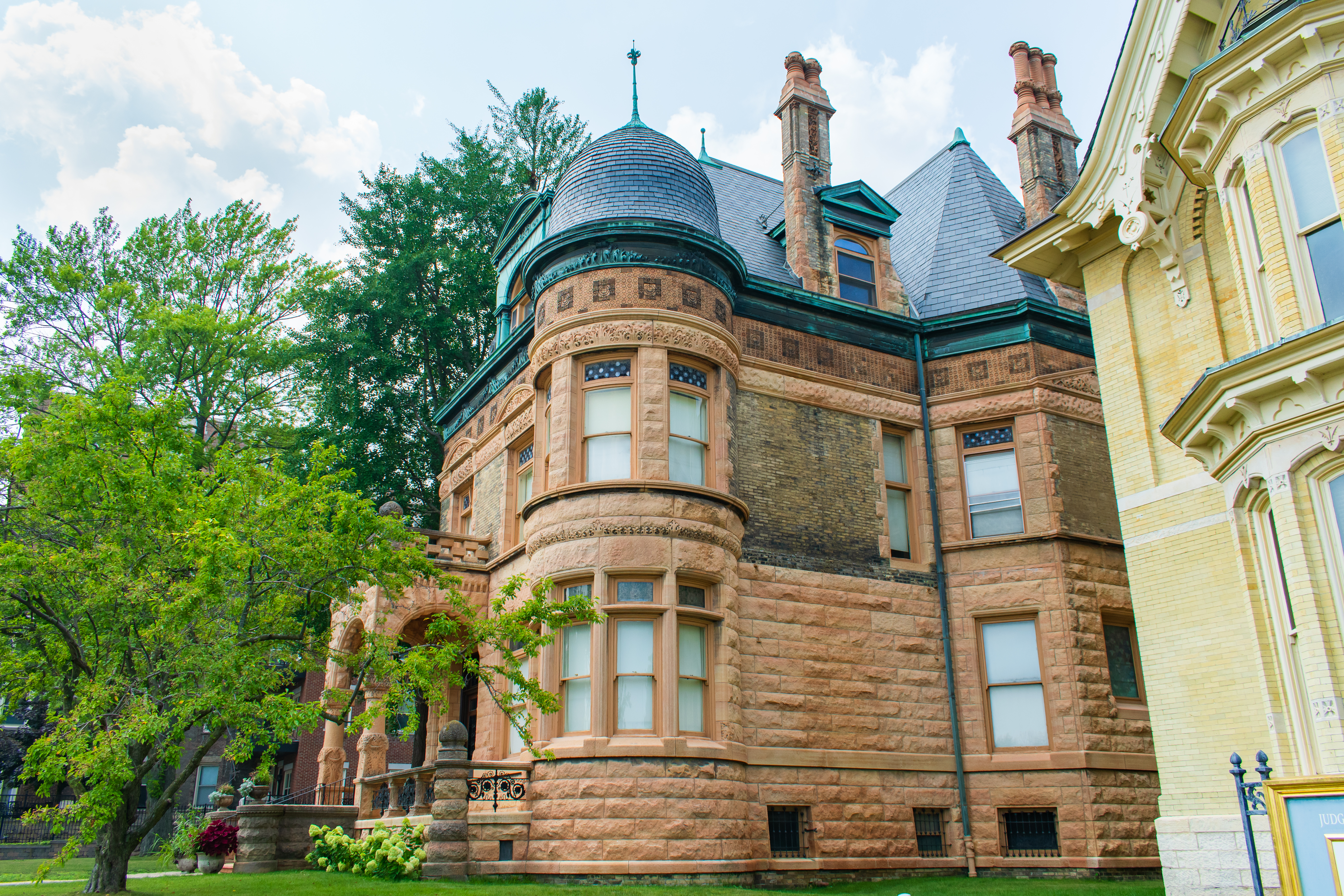
Laura and George Peckham Miller House

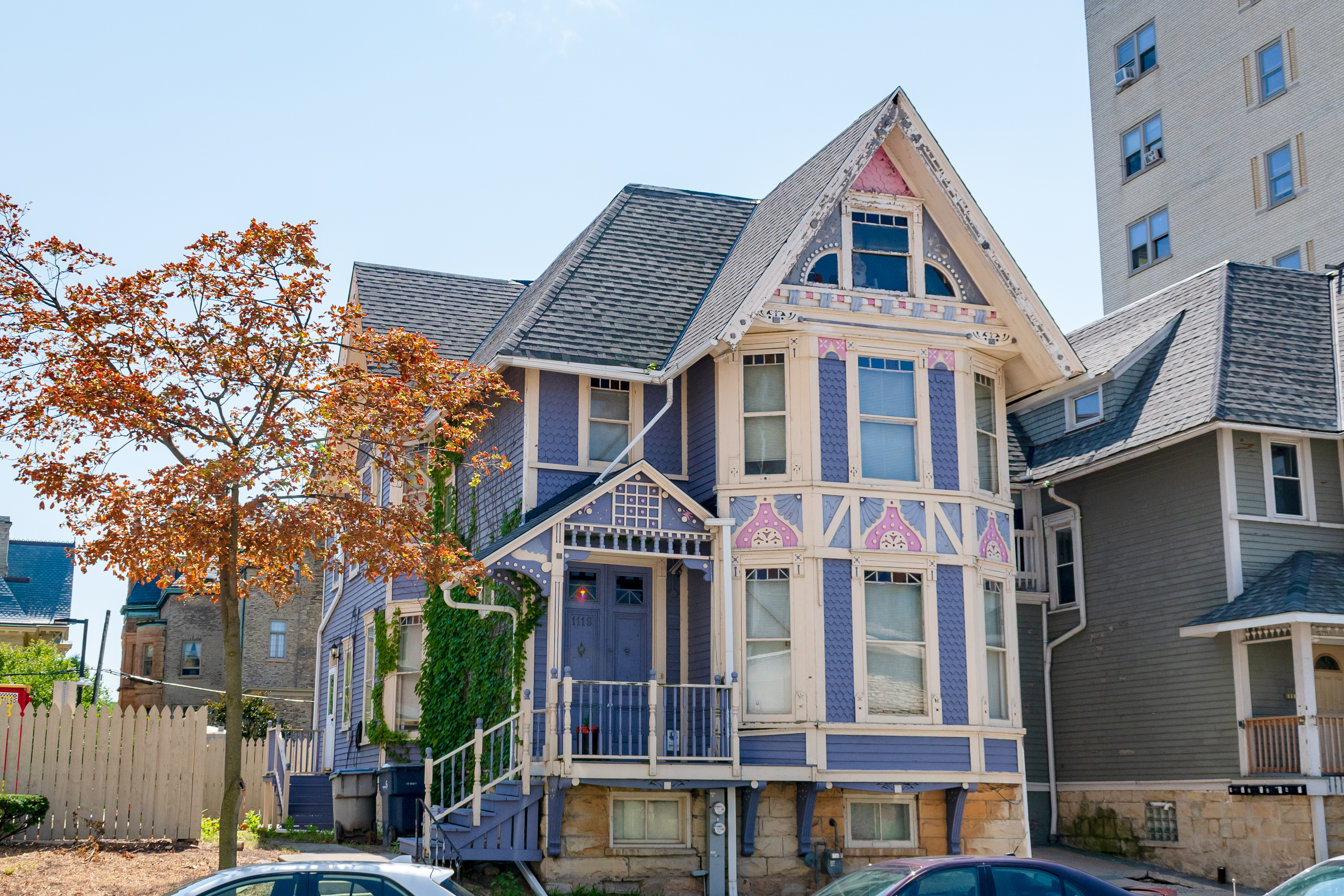
Charles F. Forsythe House

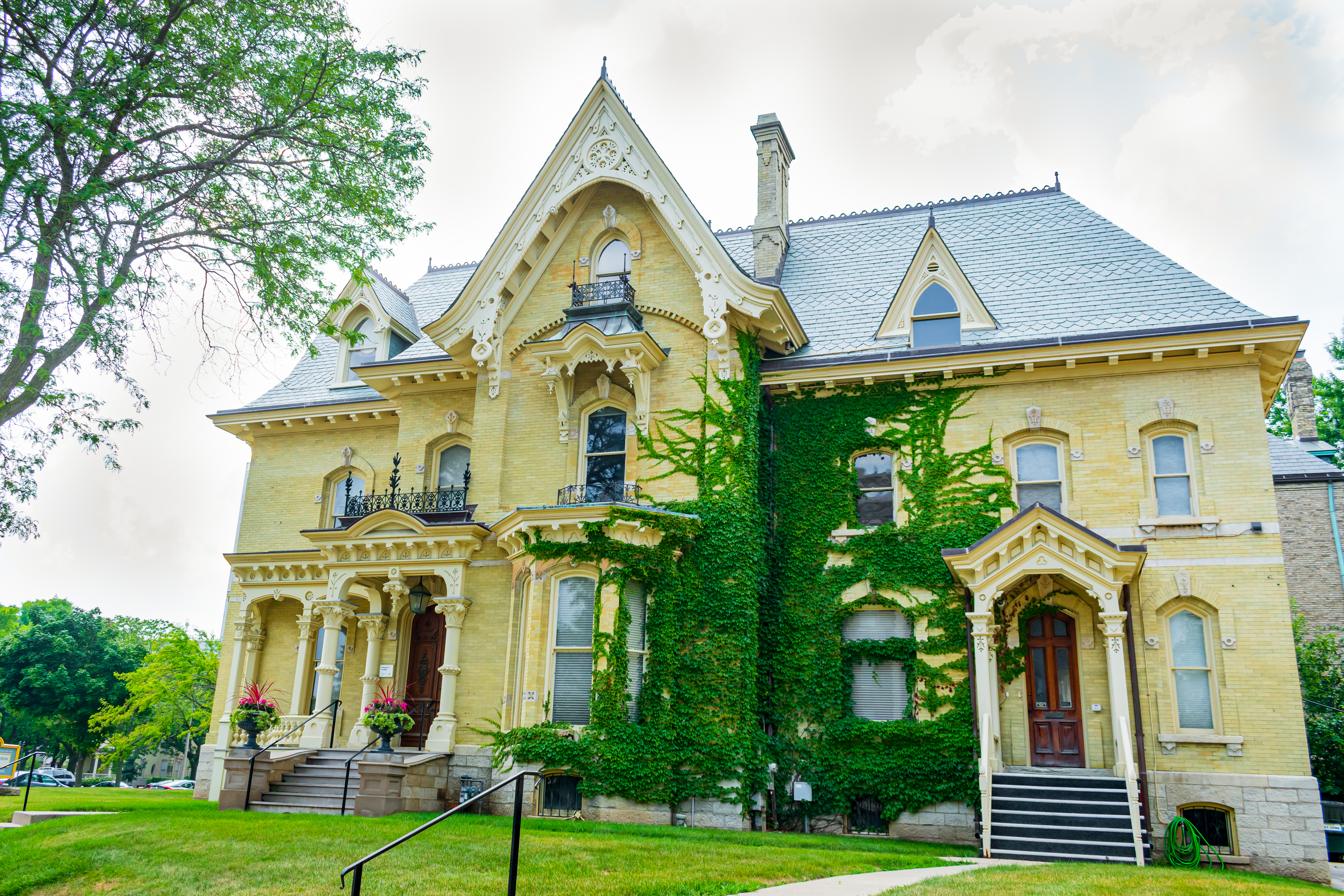
Judge Jason M. Downer House

== See also ==
- Neighborhoods of Milwaukee
