= Coles Bashford =

American politician and pioneer, Governor of Wisconsin (1816–1878)

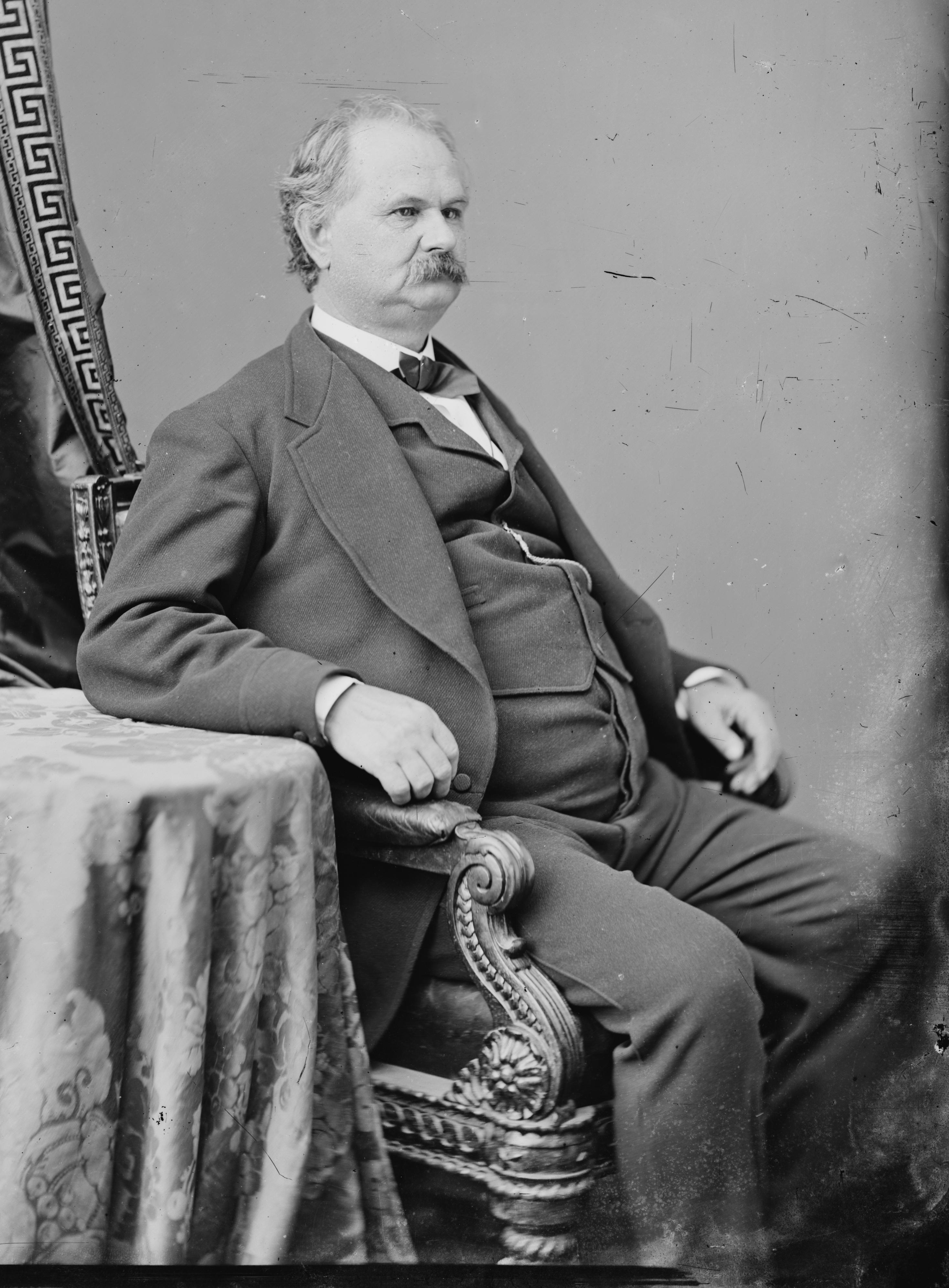

5th Governor of Wisconsin
- In office March 25, 1856 – January 4, 1858
- Lieutenant: Arthur MacArthur Sr.
- Preceded by: Arthur MacArthur Sr.
- Succeeded by: Alexander Randall

Member of the U.S. House of Representatives from Arizona Territory's at-large district
- In office March 4, 1867 – March 3, 1869
- Preceded by: John Noble Goodwin
- Succeeded by: Richard Cunningham McCormick

3rd Secretary of State of the Arizona Territory
- In office April 14, 1869 – January 8, 1876
- Nominated by: Ulysses S. Grant
- Preceded by: James P. T. Carter
- Succeeded by: John Philo Hoyt

1st Attorney General of the Arizona Territory
- In office 1864–1866
- Governor: John N. Goodwin
- Preceded by: Position established
- Succeeded by: John A. Rush

1st President of the Arizona Territorial Council
- In office September 26, 1864 – December 6, 1865
- Governor: John N. Goodwin
- Preceded by: Position established
- Succeeded by: Henry A. Bigelow

Member of the Wisconsin Senate from the 21st district
- In office January 12, 1853 – January 9, 1856
- Preceded by: Position established
- Succeeded by: John Fitzgerald

Personal details
- Born: January 24, 1816 Cold Spring, New York, U.S.
- Died: April 25, 1878 (aged 62) Prescott, Arizona Territory, U.S.
- Resting place: Mountain View Cemetery (Oakland, California)
- Party: Whig (until 1855); Republican (until 1866); Independent
- Spouse: Frances Ann Forman
- Children: 7
- Profession: Lawyer, Politician, Merchant

Coles Bashford (January 24, 1816 – April 25, 1878) was an American lawyer and politician who became the fifth governor of Wisconsin, and one of the founders of the U.S. Republican Party. His one term as governor ended in a bribery scandal that ended in him fleeing Wisconsin, but he was later instrumental in the government of the newly formed Arizona Territory.

== Early life and career ==
Bashford was born near Cold Spring in Putnam County, New York. He attended the Genesee Wesleyan Seminary in Lima, where he studied law and was admitted to the bar in 1842. He served as the District Attorney of Wayne County from 1847 until he resigned in 1850 and moved to Oshkosh, Wisconsin. He served in the Wisconsin State Senate in 1853 and 1854 as a Whig, representing Winnebago County. After the Whigs split on the issue of abolition, Bashford became one of the founding candidates of the Republican Party.

== 1855 election scandal ==
Bashford ran for governor as a Republican in 1855 and was at first declared the loser to the Democratic incumbent, William A. Barstow, by a mere 157 votes. However, Bashford claimed the result was fraudulent, and it was later discovered that Barstow's win was due to forged election returns coming from non-existent precincts in the sparsely populated northern part of the state, in addition to other irregularities such as two separate canvassing boards claiming legitimacy in Waupaca County. With rival militia units converging on the state capitol in Madison, Bashford was sworn in quietly in the chambers of the Wisconsin Supreme Court, by Chief Justice Edward Whiton, on January 7, 1856.

On the same day, Barstow was publicly inaugurated with full ceremony. The Wisconsin Attorney General filed quo warranto proceedings in the Wisconsin Supreme Court to remove Barstow, who declared that he would not "give up his office alive." After challenging the court's jurisdiction without success and noting that the tide of public opinion had turned against him, Barstow declined to contest the fraud allegations and sent his resignation to the legislature on March 21, 1856, leaving the lieutenant governor, Arthur MacArthur, as acting governor. On March 24, the court unanimously awarded the governorship to Bashford by a count of 1,009 votes. Bashford was represented in the case by Edward G. Ryan, who, two decades later, would serve as Chief Justice of the Wisconsin Supreme Court.

The following day, as Madison was crowded with onlookers, Bashford entered the Capitol with the court's judgment in hand, in the company of a sheriff and a throng of followers, and announced to MacArthur that he had come to claim his office. Upon Bashford's threat that force would be used if necessary, MacArthur and his supporters quickly left. Despite initial opposition by the Democrats in the State Assembly, both houses of the Wisconsin State Legislature soon recognized Bashford as the new governor.

== Term as governor and railroad scandal ==
As governor, Bashford appointed the first Black officeholder to Wisconsin state office when he made barber and entrepreneur William Noland a notary public in 1857. Bashford declined renomination from the Republican Party and left office at the end of his term on January 4, 1858.

Mere weeks later, an investigation was launched regarding bribes that he and members of his administration had accepted from the La Crosse & Milwaukee Railroad Company in exchange for approval of a major land grant. Bashford himself had received the largest payoff in the form of $50,000 in stocks and $15,000 in cash from the railroad company; state legislators and a Wisconsin Supreme Court justice were also involved in payoffs exceeding $400,000 in total. Nearly every copy of the final investigative report was seized and burned by the implicated politicians, but public outrage spread despite the suppression.

Bashford managed to cash in his stock before the railroad company folded as a result of the investigation, and fled the state. He traveled first to Washington, D.C., in 1862, and then left for the Arizona Territory, in 1863, with his brother, Levi, who was to be Surveyor General of the newly created territory. They made the arduous, cross-continental journey accompanying the "Governor's party"—the appointed territorial officials led by Governor John Noble Goodwin—and arrived in the Arizona Territory in December 1863.

== Arizona Territory career ==
Though moving to the Territory as a private citizen, Bashford was soon appointed its first Attorney General by Governor Goodwin, serving from 1864 until 1866. His position required him to journey throughout the Territory, frequently travelling through land considered "hostile Indian country", but he executed these duties without incident. Bashford was also the first lawyer admitted to practice in the Arizona Territorial Courts and compiled the session laws of the Territory into one 400-page volume with the assistance of Associate Justice William T. Howell. He was elected President of the first Territorial Council (the Territory's upper legislative body) in 1864 and served from 1867 until 1869 as a territorial delegate to the 40th United States Congress as an independent, rather than with his former party.

The last political office Bashford held was Secretary of State for the Arizona Territory, by appointment from U.S. President Ulysses S. Grant in 1869, and again in 1873. After the Territory's capital moved from Prescott, where Bashford and Levi ran the Bashford Mercantile Store, Bashford resigned in 1876 to stay close to his business interests. He died in Prescott two years later. Bashford was buried in Mountain View Cemetery, in Oakland, California. He and his wife Frances Adams had seven children: Belle (who had died at age 11), Edward, Elizabeth, Helen, Lillian, Margaret, and William Coles. The Bashford Mercantile Store remained operating in Prescott until the 1940s.

== Electoral history ==
Wisconsin Gubernatorial Election, 1855
Party	Candidate	Votes	%	±%
General Election, November 6, 1855
Republican	Coles Bashford	36,198	49.9%	+10.6%
Democratic	William A. Barstow	36,355	50.1%	−4.5%
	Scattering	45	nil	
Total votes		72,598	100.0%	+30.4%
Republican gain from Democratic				

== See also ==
- List of governors of Wisconsin
- 1855 Wisconsin gubernatorial election

Party political offices
New party	Republican nominee for Governor of Wisconsin; 1855	Succeeded by Alexander W. Randall
Wisconsin Senate
New district	Member of the Wisconsin Senate from the 21st district January 12, 1853 – January 9, 1856	Succeeded by John Fitzgerald
U.S. House of Representatives
Preceded by John Noble Goodwin	Delegate to the U.S. House of Representatives from the Arizona Territory's at-large congressional district 1867–1869	Succeeded by Richard Cunningham McCormick
Political offices
Preceded by Arthur MacArthur, Sr.	Governor of Wisconsin; 1856 – 1858	Succeeded by Alexander W. Randall
New office	President of the Arizona Territorial Council; 1864 – 1865	Succeeded by Henry A. Bigelow
Preceded by James P. T. Carter	Secretary of Arizona Territory; 1869 – 1876	Succeeded by John Philo Hoyt
Legal offices
New office	Attorney General of Arizona Territory; 1864 – 1866	Succeeded by John A. Rush
