= Dakota Land Company =

Defunct land-speculation company

- Founded: May 23, 1857; 169 years ago in St. Paul, Minnesota, United States
- Founder: Samuel Medary
- Defunct: 1861
- Area served: Minnesota Territory (1857-1858); Dakota Territory (1858-1861)
- Owner: Minnesota Democratic Party

The Dakota Land Company was a fraudulent land-speculation company active in what is now Minnesota, South Dakota, and North Dakota from 1857 until 1861.

== Founding ==
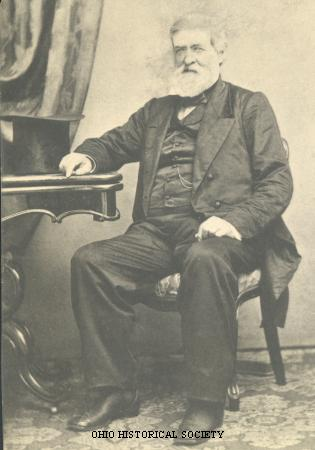
Samuel Medary

The company was owned by the Minnesota Democratic Party. Democratic territorial governor Samuel Medary officially incorporated the Company on May 23rd, 1857. The incorporators who signed off on the plan were Medary himself, William H. Nobles, Joseph R. Brown, Alpheus G. Fuller, Jefferson P. Kidder, Samuel J. Albright, Byron M. Smith, Judge Charles E. Flandrau, James M. Allen, Franklin J. DeWitt, Nathanial R. Brown, and James W. Lynd. The company was granted the authority to purchase, or simply claim, any land in the Minnesota Territory. It was also given license to construct buildings and industry, and exclusive rights to operate ferries across the Missouri River, Big Sioux River, and James River for twenty years.

It was headquartered in St. Paul, Minnesota however from June of 1857 onwards it was based out of Sioux Falls, South Dakota, then part of the Minnesota Territory. That month, the first two 'paper towns' (Note: towns that existed on maps but had few to no residents) were created. They were named Great Oasis, Minnesota (intended as the seat for the newly created Murray County) and Saratoga, Minnesota (Note: unrelated to the extant Saratoga, Minnesota) (intended as the seat for the newly created Cottonwood County). Newly created counties without populations quickly had many officials appointed, with said officials now receiving pay for jobs that did not actually exist in any capacity but the pay itself.

== In the Minnesota Territory ==
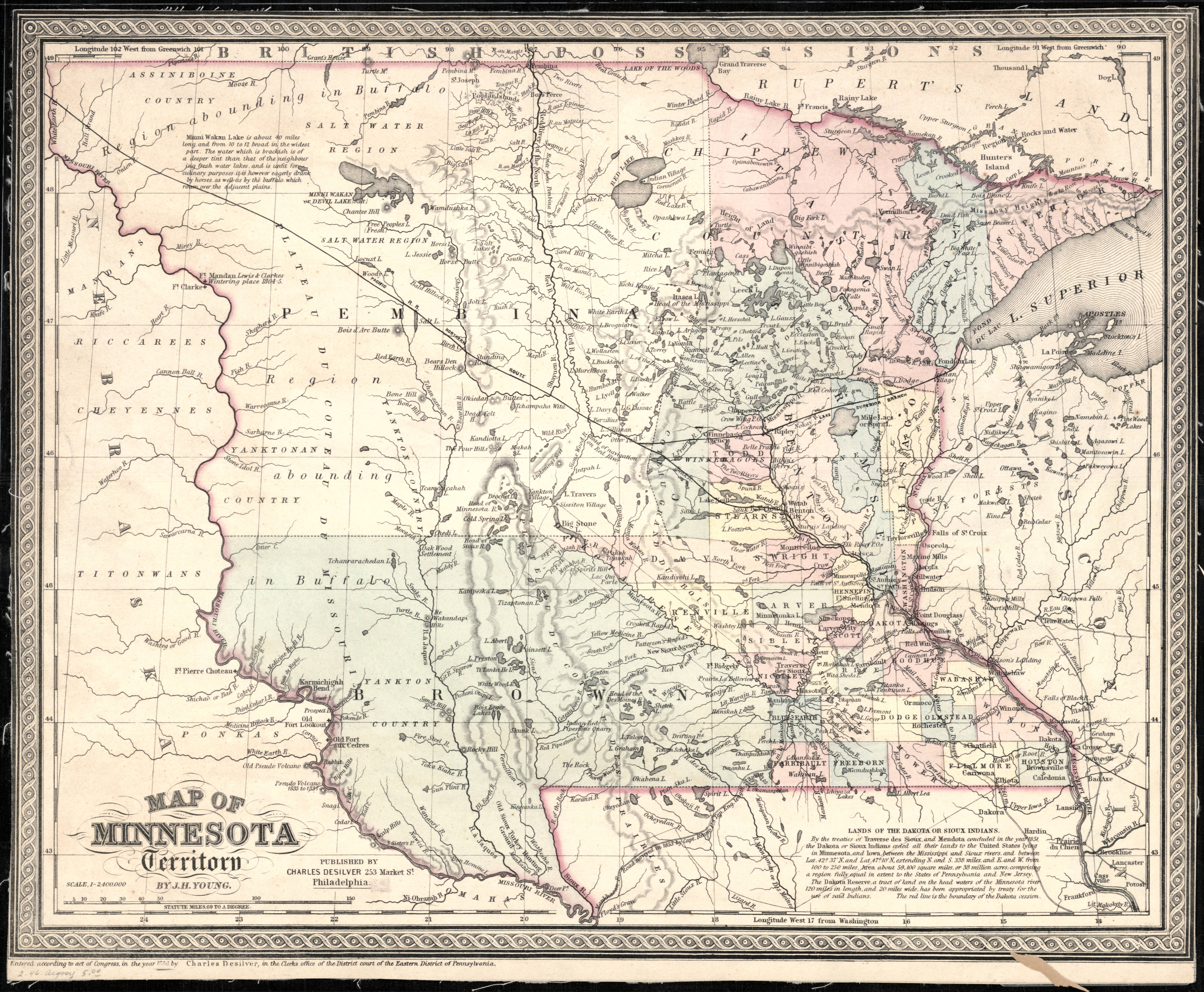
Map of Minnesota Territory

In July of 1857, the State Democratic Convention was held. Multiple members of the Dakota Land Company attended, notably Franklin J. De Witt and Nathanial R. Brown, both of whom represented fictional populations from fictional settlements. In September of 1857, Governor Medary, then out-of-state, created about forty new precincts for the upcoming 1857 Minnesota gubernatorial election to build legitimacy for these settlements. October 13th was election day, and early returns showed Republican Alexander Ramsey in the lead. On October 26th, the Republicans declared victory.

On October 28th, the Dakota Land Company reported that in the counties they had settled, Sibley won 221 out of 223 votes - 99.1% of votes. A board was created to investigate claims of corruption, however the board would be led by Samuel Medary, Joseph R. Brown, and other Dakota Land Company directors. The board would eliminate a few votes, however declared Democrat Henry Hastings Sibley the victor by only 240 votes.

== In the Dakota Territory ==
Following the election and Minnesota's soon-to-be statehood, the company then turned to advocating for president James Buchanan to establish the Dakota Territory, hoping to establish a Democrat-led monopoly over the territory. The newspaper 'Minnesotian' warned that the Dakota Land Company aimed to "gull Congress into passing an organic act, and Buchanan will be only too glad of an opportunity to reward a dozen or two hungry Democratic leeches with fat offices, good pay, and nothing to do." On 24 October 1857, members of the Dakota Land Company held a meeting in Sioux Falls and decided that instead of waiting for permission from Buchanan or congress, the settlers in the area would meet in the paper town of Medary and assemble their own territorial government.

In May of 1858, the unrecognized territorial government sent Alpheus G. Fuller as territorial delegate to congress. His admittance was supported by Thomas L. Harris, who believed the falsified population number of 10,000-15,000 residents in the territory. Fuller described a densely populated area, already populated with large towns and fully settled. The House Committee on Elections refused to seat Fuller.

Worsening the situation for the Dakota Land Company were the Dakota themselves. Nearly all settlement outside of Sioux Falls was illegal, and as there was no authority willing to negotiate with them, Medary and Flandreau (two paper towns that the Company had moved people to as to increase legitimacy) were burned. Medary on June 10, 1858, and sometime a few days later, Flandreau as well. Governor Sibley proposed the State of Minnesota raise a militia for revenge. No such militia was assembled.

Around this time, Samuel J. Albright founded the Dakota Democrat newspaper. However, as Albright was an owner of the Dakota Land Company, the true purpose of the newspaper quickly became advertising land deals in the territory, and most copies were simply sent to be sold in eastern states to attract settlers.

On September 18, 1858, Dakota Land Company owners declared that an election for a territorial government would be held on October 4th. Henry Masters was declared governor after the election, which was entirely fabricated by the Company. The election procedure was as follows; On election day, three or four men would set out in wagons, arriving to the various 'precincts', often locations with no people at all, write down a number of names, who were claimed to be future settlers. In reality, zero ballots were cast. In November of 1858 the 'Squatter Legislature' assembled. The Company-owned Legislature sent Fuller to congress to legalize the territory, and a bill to do so was proposed by Minnesota Democrat Henry M. Rice. The Bill would not pass committee.

In June of 1859, the Dakota Land Company raised its flag (Note: there is no known depiction or description of what this flag looked like) over every settlement and landmark it controlled, asserting that it had complete control over the territory. Despite achieving its goal of a political monopoly over the territory, the company had neglected its actual business practices, leaving it with a balance of just $25.10 (as reported by Secretary Samuel Wigfall) by 1859. On September 13, 1859 another election with entirely fraudulent elections was held, this time electing Jefferson P Kidder to go to congress. It would take him until 12 April 1860 to arrive, and he was once again turned down.

The scheme finally collapsed when the 1860 census returns were released, revealing that the entire territory had a population of 2,376. President Buchanan would finally officially found the Dakota Territory on March 2, 1861. However, incoming Republican president Abraham Lincoln would legally appoint all offices, ending Company control.

== Legacy ==
Multiple settlements founded by the Company have survived as unincorporated communities. Flandreau, South Dakota is the only townsite that ever became a city.

There is an unrelated Real Estate company called the Dakota Land Company that currently operates out of Haakon County.
