= Governor of Wisconsin =

Head of government of the U.S. state of Wisconsin

- Privy Seal of the State of Wisconsin

- State flag

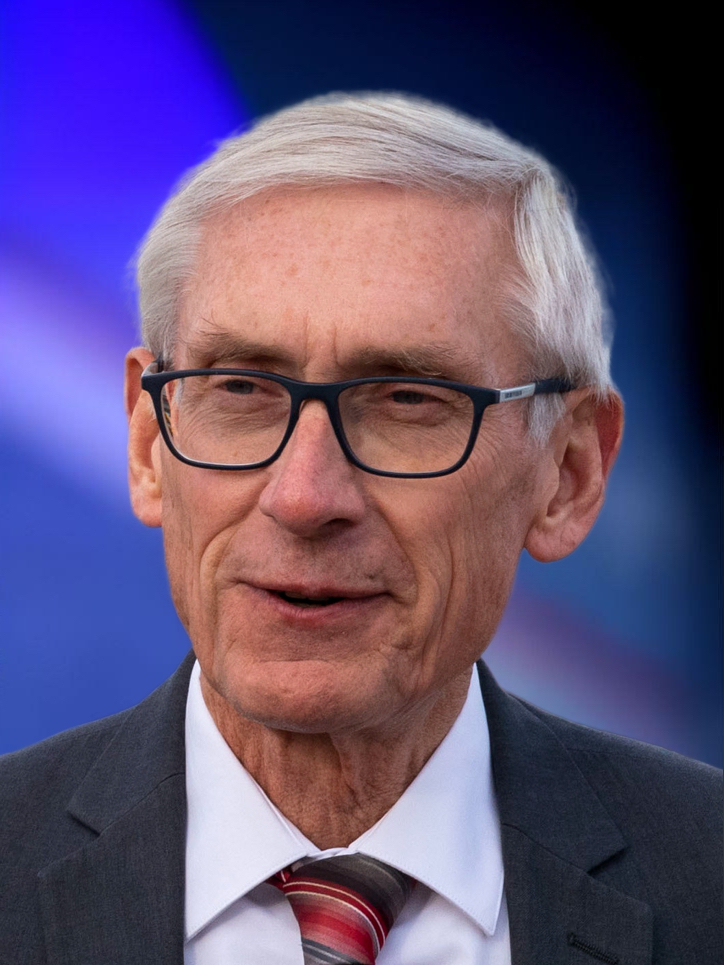
- Incumbent; Tony Evers since January 7, 2019
- Government of Wisconsin
- Style: Governor (informal); The Honorable (formal); His Excellency (formal)
- Status: Head of state Commander in chief
- Residence: Wisconsin Governor's Mansion
- Seat: Madison, WI
- Term length: Four years, no term limits
- Inaugural holder: Nelson Dewey
- Formation: June 7, 1848
- Succession: Line of succession
- Deputy: Lieutenant Governor of Wisconsin
- Salary: $152,756 (2022)
- Website: Official website

The governor of Wisconsin is the head of government of Wisconsin and the commander-in-chief of the state's army and air forces. The governor has a duty to enforce state laws, and the power to either approve or veto bills passed by the Wisconsin Legislature, to convene the legislature, and to grant pardons, except in cases of treason and impeachment.

The 46th and current governor is Tony Evers, a Democrat, who took office on January 7, 2019.

The position was first filled by Nelson Dewey on June 7, 1848, the year Wisconsin became a state. Prior to statehood, there were four governors of Wisconsin Territory.

== Powers ==
The governor of Wisconsin has both inherent powers granted by the Wisconsin Constitution and administrative powers granted by laws passed by the Wisconsin State Legislature.

=== Inherent powers ===
The inherent powers of the governor of Wisconsin are outlined in the Wisconsin Constitution at Article V, Section 4. In general, the governor ensures that the laws of Wisconsin are carried out.

==== Veto power ====
The governor of Wisconsin has the strongest veto power of nearly any American governor. Any bill passed by the Wisconsin State Legislature must be presented to the governor, who either signs it into law, or vetoes it. In the event of a veto, the bill is returned to the legislature, who may then vote to override the veto. In 1930, the Wisconsin Constitution was amended to give the governor line-item veto power, which allows portions of appropriations bills to be struck out without rejecting the entire bill. Governors have the power to strike out words, numbers, and even entire sentences from bills. The partial veto may still be overridden by the legislature.

In 1990 a further amendment specified that the line-item veto does not give the governor power to veto individual letters of appropriations bills, thereby forming new words. Despite this 1990 law, the strength of the governor's veto power gave rise to the term "Frankenstein veto" to describe the governor's ability to form a new bill that subverts the intent of the legislature. In 2023, Governor Tony Evers used the power to change a portion of the state budget that funded schools until the "2024-2025" school year to "2425," increasing funding for over 400 years. On April 18, 2025, the Wisconsin Supreme Court ruled it within his constitutional powers.

==== Commander-in-chief powers ====
Like many other governors, the governor of Wisconsin is the commander-in-chief of the state's militia. This includes the Wisconsin National Guard. Although the governor is constitutionally the commander-in-chief, in practice the governor delegates operational decisions of the National Guard to the Wisconsin Adjutant General.

Somewhat unusually, the Wisconsin Governor also has authority over state naval forces. This is a vestige from the early years of the Constitution, as the state has had no naval units since the late 19th century.

==== Pardon power ====
The governor may pardon, commute, or grant reprieve of sentences, except in cases of treason or impeachment. The governor must notify the Wisconsin State Legislature of these each year, along with the reasons for them. In cases of treason, the governor may suspend the carrying out of the sentence until the next session of the legislature, who then vote to grant a pardon, commutation or reprieve, or to carry out the sentence.

The pardon power has seen very different uses by the two most recent governors. The current governor, Tony Evers, has issued a record high number of pardons. The previous governor, Scott Walker, did not issue any pardons.

==== Other inherent powers ====
If it is deemed necessary, the governor may also convene extraordinary sessions of the state legislature; and may convene them anywhere in the state, if Madison, the state capital, is deemed unfit for the purpose due to invasion or contagious disease. This power to convene outside of Madison has never been invoked.

The governor must also "communicate to the legislature, at every session, the condition of the state, and recommend such matters to them for their consideration as he may deem expedient" (these annual communications are referred to as the "state of the state").

=== Administrative and budgetary powers ===
The governor of Wisconsin, as head of the executive branch, also has administrative powers (the power to administer agencies created by the Wisconsin legislature). Since 1965, there has been an increase in executive orders to "establish standards and provide uniformity to executive agency operations and programs." However, since 2011, the Wisconsin Legislature has attempted to limit the authority of administrative agencies.

The governor also appoints heads of agencies created by the legislature. This appointment power is not explicitly granted by the Wisconsin Constitution, as it is in the appointments clause of the federal constitution, with the exception of appointing judicial vacancies. Instead, the governor appoints heads of agencies by statute. The governor of Wisconsin had 307 executive appointments between 2017 and 2018.

The governor of Wisconsin is more limited in appointments than other executives, such as the President of the United States. For example, supreme court justices are not appointed, but elected directly. Other executive offices, such as Secretary of State of Wisconsin and Superintendent of Public Instruction of Wisconsin, are directly elected and not appointed by the governor. Other appointments, such as to the Wisconsin Natural Resources Board, are staggered. This means that some agencies have agendas that conflict with the governor's agenda. In some cases, when the Wisconsin Senate has not confirmed the governor's appointments, the previous appointees have refused to retire, extending the previous governor's influence into the current governor's term.

State law requires the governor to prepare an executive budget bill. This helps the governor "to pursue a legislative agenda".

== Elections and term of office ==
The governor of Wisconsin is directly elected—the candidate with the most votes becomes governor. If two candidates receive an equal number of votes, which is higher than that received by any other candidate, the members of the state legislature vote between the two at their next session.

Governors are currently elected for a term of four years, and they have been since the 1970 election, when a 1967 amendment extended the term from two years. There is no limit to the number of terms a governor may hold. The longest-serving governor was Tommy Thompson, from January 5, 1987, until February 1, 2001, a total of 14 years and 28 days. The shortest-serving was Arthur MacArthur Sr., from March 21, 1856, until March 25 of the same year; a total of 5 days.

Candidates for the office must be citizens of the United States and qualified voters in the state of Wisconsin.

=== Removal ===
The governor usually leaves office because their term ends and they have not been re-elected. But the governor may also leave office through other means. For example, the governor may resign from office. Four governors have resigned: William Barstow due to fraud allegations, Robert La Follette Sr. to take his seat in the United States Senate, Patrick Joseph Lucey to become Ambassador to Mexico, and Tommy Thompson to become United States Secretary of Health and Human Services. Additionally two governors—Louis Harvey and Walter Samuel Goodland—died while in office, and Orland Loomis, who was elected governor, died before taking office.

The governor can also be removed through an impeachment trial or through a recall election. An impeachment trial is carried out by the Wisconsin State Assembly, if a majority of its members agree to the impeachment. No governors have been removed from office through impeachment in the history of Wisconsin. However, Arthur MacArthur Sr., who, as lieutenant governor, became acting governor upon the resignation of William Barstow in 1856, was removed after the Wisconsin Supreme Court ruled that Barstow's opponent in the previous election, Coles Bashford, was the election's legitimate winner.

Recall elections did not occur in Wisconsin history until the 21st century. In 2012, Scott Walker became the only governor in Wisconsin history to face a recall election, and the first governor in American history to survive such a recall election.

=== Election history ===
In the 2022 gubernatorial election, over 2.6 million voters cast ballots for governor. This was the highest vote count for a gubernatorial election in state history, surpassing the 2012 recall election by 140,000 votes. There have been 44 governors of Wisconsin and 45 individual governorships. 1 governor, Philip La Follette, served non-consecutive terms. Four parties have had their candidates elected governor: the Democratic, the Whig, the Republican and the Progressive. In 2026, David Crowley was elected as the first African-American governor.

== Succession ==
The lieutenant governor is elected as the governor's successor. Since 1979, an amendment to the Wisconsin Constitution specifies that the lieutenant governor becomes governor for the remainder of the term in the event of the governor's death, resignation or removal from office. However, in the case of impeachment, incapacitation or absence, the lieutenant governor's role is limited to "acting governor" until the governor can return to his duties. The secretary of state is the successor in case the lieutenant governor is unable to serve as governor or acting governor.

Since 1967, the Wisconsin Constitution has specified that the governor and lieutenant governor of Wisconsin are elected together. Prior to this amendment, there were nine incidents in which the elected governor and lieutenant governor were not of the same political party.

== Timeline ==
Timeline of Wisconsin governors
