= 1855 Wisconsin gubernatorial election =

- November 6, 1855
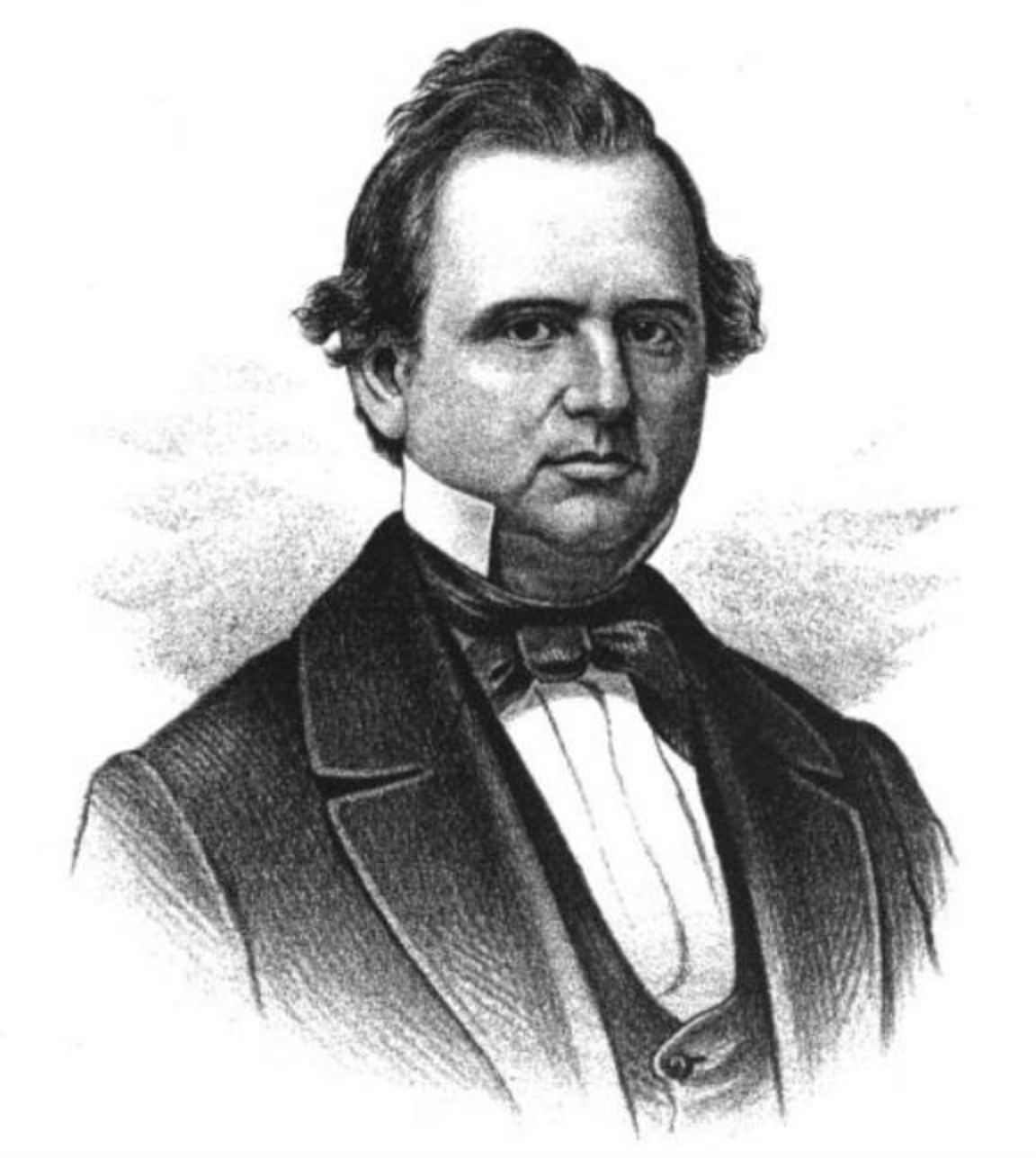

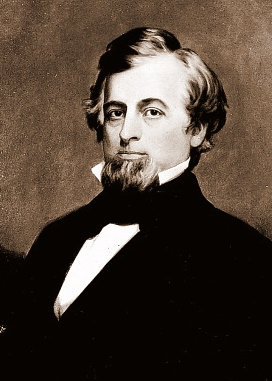
Nominee	Coles Bashford	William A. Barstow
Party	Republican	Democratic
Popular vote	36,198	36,355
Percentage	49.86%	50.08%
- County results Bashford: 50–60% 60–70% 70–80% Barstow: 50–60% 60–70% 70–80%
Governor before election
William A. Barstow
Democratic
Elected Governor
Coles Bashford
Republican

The 1855 Wisconsin gubernatorial election was held on November 6, 1855. Republican Party candidate Coles Bashford was declared the winner after a court challenge, defeating Democratic incumbent William A. Barstow.

Barstow was initially declared the winner of the election, having apparently received just over 50% of the vote. However, Bashford and the Wisconsin Attorney General, George Baldwin Smith, filed suit in the Wisconsin Supreme Court in the case Atty. Gen. ex rel. Bashford v. Barstow. They alleged that Barstow's allies had created fraudulent election returns in several fake precincts in Wisconsin's northern counties. The court found that Bashford had won the election, and was entitled to the governorship. Before the court could formally remove him from office, Barstow resigned, leaving his Lieutenant Governor Arthur MacArthur Sr., as acting Governor, until Bashford was sworn in four days later.

== Results ==
These are the results as originally certified by the Board of State Canvassers. Barstow ultimately did take office for the new term prior to the court rendering its decision that Bashford was the true winner.

1855 Wisconsin Gubernatorial Election
Party	Candidate	Votes	%	±%
Democratic	William A. Barstow (incumbent)	36,355	50.08%	−4.53%
Republican	Coles Bashford	36,198	49.86%	
	Scattering	45	0.06%	
Majority		157	0.22%	
Total votes		72,598	100.00%	
Democratic hold		Swing	-15.08%	

=== Results by county ===
There were no votes from Kewaunee County, La Crosse County, La Pointe County, (Note: Some sources credit Barstow with 38 votes in La Pointe County, although these are not listed on the official canvass. The 1856 Tribune Almanac indicates that La Pointe County voted with Douglas County in this election.) and St. Croix County. Dunn County would not vote for a Democrat again until 1970 and Waupaca County would not vote for a Democrat again until 1932.

County	William A. Barstow Democratic		Coles Bashford Republican		Scattering Write-in		Margin		Total votes cast
County	#	%	#	%	#	%	#	%	Total votes cast
Adams	376	38.10%	611	61.90%	0	0.00%	-235	-23.81%	987
Bad Ax	298	49.34%	306	50.66%	0	0.00%	-8	-1.32%	604
Brown	335	62.50%	201	37.50%	0	0.00%	134	25.00%	536
Buffalo	115	93.50%	8	6.50%	0	0.00%	107	86.99%	123
Calumet	377	54.24%	318	45.76%	0	0.00%	59	8.49%	695
Chippewa	121	61.11%	77	38.89%	0	0.00%	44	22.22%	198
Clark	45	86.54%	7	13.46%	0	0.00%	38	73.08%	52
Columbia	906	36.34%	1,580	63.38%	7	0.28%	-674	-27.04%	2,493
Crawford	163	57.60%	120	42.40%	0	0.00%	43	15.19%	283
Dane	2,367	49.73%	2,387	50.15%	6	0.13%	-20	-0.42%	4,760
Dodge	2,364	51.97%	2,185	48.03%	0	0.00%	179	3.93%	4,549
Door	0	0.00%	81	100.00%	0	0.00%	-81	-100.00%	81
Douglas	88	91.67%	8	8.33%	0	0.00%	80	83.33%	96
Dunn	124	74.25%	43	25.75%	0	0.00%	81	48.50%	167
Fond du Lac	1,722	46.40%	1,989	53.60%	0	0.00%	-267	-7.19%	3,711
Grant	1,112	41.19%	1,588	58.81%	0	0.00%	-476	-17.63%	2,700
Green	600	34.78%	1,123	65.10%	2	0.12%	-523	-30.32%	1,725
Iowa	1,092	58.71%	768	41.29%	0	0.00%	324	17.42%	1,860
Jackson	114	39.31%	176	60.69%	0	0.00%	-62	-21.38%	290
Jefferson	1,558	47.07%	1,746	52.75%	6	0.18%	-188	-5.68%	3,310
Kenosha	610	38.01%	995	61.99%	0	0.00%	-385	-23.99%	1,605
Lafayette	1,199	61.74%	743	38.26%	0	0.00%	456	23.48%	1,942
Manitowoc	941	64.06%	528	35.94%	0	0.00%	413	28.11%	1,469
Marathon	104	53.61%	88	45.36%	2	1.03%	16	8.25%	194
Marquette	858	41.91%	1,187	57.99%	2	0.10%	-329	-16.07%	2,047
Milwaukee	4,627	72.52%	1,749	27.41%	4	0.06%	28.78	45.11%	6,380
Monroe	92	30.16%	213	69.84%	0	0.00%	-121	-39.67%	305
Oconto	131	59.82%	88	40.18%	0	0.00%	43	19.63%	219
Outagamie	382	47.69%	414	51.69%	5	0.62%	-32	-4.00%	801
Ozaukee	1,586	85.36%	271	14.59%	1	0.05%	1,315	70.78%	1,858
Pierce	55	27.23%	147	72.77%	0	0.00%	-92	-45.54%	202
Polk	149	88.17%	20	11.83%	0	0.00%	129	76.33%	169
Portage	235	36.21%	414	63.79%	0	0.00%	-179	-27.58%	649
Racine	1,344	51.91%	1,245	48.09%	0	0.00%	99	3.82%	2,589
Richland	186	29.34%	448	70.66%	0	0.00%	-262	-41.32%	634
Rock	1,018	27.43%	2,690	72.49%	3	0.08%	-1,672	-45.06%	3,711
Sauk	482	33.61%	950	66.25%	2	0.14%	-468	-32.64%	1,434
Shawano	38	46.34%	44	53.66%	0	0.00%	-6	-7.32%	82
Sheboygan	1,306	54.08%	1,108	45.88%	1	0.04%	198	8.20%	2,415
Trempealeau	18	27.69%	47	72.31%	0	0.00%	-29	-44.62%	65
Walworth	1,112	34.83%	2,081	65.17%	0	0.00%	-969	-30.35%	3,193
Washington	2,301	81.31%	528	18.66%	1	0.04%	1,773	62.65%	2,830
Waukesha	1,512	39.42%	2,324	60.58%	0	0.00%	-812	-21.17%	3,836
Waupaca	806	67.67%	385	32.33%	0	0.00%	421	35.35%	1,191
Waushara	248	34.16%	478	65.84%	0	0.00%	-230	-31.68%	726
Winnebago	1,138	40.18%	1,691	59.71%	3	0.11%	-553	-19.53%	2,832
Total	36,335	50.08%	36,198	49.86%	45	0.06%	157	0.22%	72,598

==== Counties that flipped from Whig to Democratic ====
- Brown
- Marathon
- Oconto

==== Counties that flipped from Independent to Democratic ====
- Iowa

==== Counties that flipped from Democratic to Republican ====
- Adams
- Bad Ax
- Columbia
- Dane
- Fond du Lac
- Green
- Jackson
- Outagamie
- Pierce
- Portage
- Richland
- Sauk

==== Counties that flipped from Independent to Republican ====
- Grant
- Jefferson
- Kenosha
- Marquette
- Rock
- Walworth
- Waukesha
- Waushara
- Winnebago

== See also ==
- 1857 Minnesota gubernatorial election
