= William A. Barstow =

American politician (1813–1865)

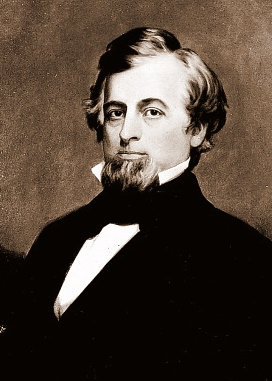
- 1850s portrait

3rd Governor of Wisconsin
- In office January 2, 1854 – March 21, 1856
- Lieutenant: James T. Lewis; Arthur MacArthur Sr.
- Preceded by: Leonard J. Farwell
- Succeeded by: Arthur MacArthur Sr. (acting); Coles Bashford (elected)

2nd Adjutant General of Wisconsin
- In office April 1, 1851 – April 1, 1852
- Governor: Nelson Dewey
- Preceded by: William Rudolph Smith
- Succeeded by: William L. Utley

2nd Secretary of State of Wisconsin
- In office January 7, 1850 – January 5, 1852
- Governor: Nelson Dewey
- Preceded by: Thomas McHugh
- Succeeded by: Charles D. Robinson

Personal details
- Born: September 13, 1813 Plainfield, Connecticut, U.S.
- Died: December 13, 1865 (aged 52) Leavenworth, Kansas, U.S.
- Resting place: Brookmere Cemetery, Cleveland, Ohio
- Spouse: Maria Quarles (m. 1844)
- Children: Frank Quarles Barstow^{(b. 1846; died 1909)}; Augustus Quarles Barstow^{(b. 1848; died 1906)}; William Augustus Barstow^{(b. 1850; died 1910)}; Horatio Nelson Barstow^{(b. 1854; died 1891)}
- Parents: William Augusta Barstow (father); Sally (Hall) Barstow (mother)
- Relatives: John L. Barstow (1st cousin, once removed)

Military service
- Allegiance: United States
- Branch/service: United States Army; Union Army
- Years of service: 1861–1865
- Rank: Brig. General, USV
- Commands: 3rd Reg. Wis. Vol. Cavalry
- Battles/wars: American Civil War; First Battle of Newtonia; Battle of Prairie Grove

William Augustus Barstow (September 13, 1813 – December 13, 1865) was an American businessman, politician, and Wisconsin pioneer. He was Wisconsin's third governor (1854–1856) and second Secretary of State (1850–1852). Barstow's administration was infamous in its era for corruption involving the railroad industry. For decades after, Barstow's name became synonymous with the epithets "Barstow and the 40 thieves" and "Barstow and the balance", phrases that referred to the participants in a scheme in which Barstow and dozens of lawmakers of both parties received bribes from the La Crosse and Milwaukee Railroad to influence land grants. Barstow also attempted to steal the 1855 Wisconsin gubernatorial election, and then illegitimately occupied the office of governor for the first three months of 1856 until compelled to resign. Despite the ubiquity of the charges against him and a lengthy investigation by the Wisconsin Legislature, Barstow never faced criminal liability over these events.

Before Wisconsin became a state, Barstow had been instrumental in the creation of Waukesha County, from the western half of what had been a larger Milwaukee County. After his gubernatorial term, during the American Civil War, Barstow volunteered for service as a Union Army cavalry officer and rose to the rank of brigadier general, serving mostly in the trans-Mississippi theater of the war. He struggled with disease during nearly his entire service in the war, and died just a few months after the war's conclusion.

== Early life ==
Barstow was born in Plainfield, Connecticut, and was raised there, working on his family's farm and attending local schools. At age 16, he moved to Norwich, Connecticut, and worked as a clerk in a store owned by his brother, Samuel. They later moved their business to Cleveland, Ohio. After the Panic of 1837, the Barstows moved to the Wisconsin Territory, settling in Waukesha in 1839. At the time, Waukesha was part of Milwaukee County and was known as "Prairie Village" and later "Prairieville."

== Wisconsin Territory ==
The Barstows built a flour mill and became prominent businessmen in the new settlement. William was elected postmaster in the village in 1842, and Samuel was elected to the Territorial Legislature in 1845. William ran for sheriff of Milwaukee County in 1843 on the Democratic Party ticket, but was defeated by independent candidate Edward D. Holton. In that election, Barstow was hurt by Democratic voter defections due to allegations he had packed the convention with supporters to secure his nomination.

=== Waukesha separation ===
During this time, agitation began in Prairieville and other Waukesha towns for the creation of a separate county from Milwaukee. There were several reasons for this, but the principal cause was probably the desire for Waukesha residents to keep more of their tax money for local improvements, rather than funding the growth of Milwaukee, which was how they perceived their role under the Milwaukee County organization. The Barstows became some of the leaders of the separation movement, along with Alexander Randall, with whom they were politically allied throughout these years. Samuel, now serving in the Territorial Legislature, sponsored a bill in the Legislature which put the question of separation to a referendum in the proposed county. The referendum was bitterly contested, but ultimately passed amid allegations of fraud on both sides. The town of Prairieville was renamed "Waukesha" in 1847 and became the seat of the new county.

== Political career ==
=== Secretary of State ===
At the Wisconsin Democratic Convention in September 1849, Barstow was nominated for Secretary of State of Wisconsin on the 5th ballot, defeating incumbent Thomas McHugh and other challengers, including Myron B. Williams and Frederick W. Horn. He went on to win the November general election, defeating Whig candidate Levi Alden and Free Soil candidate Edward D. Holton, and became Wisconsin's 2nd Secretary of State.

As Secretary of State, Barstow's term was consumed by scandals connected to corruption of federal land grants and state government contracts associated with printing, the state insane asylum, and the state treasury. In particular, he was implicated by a statement from a Madison Argus editor who stated his determination to win a State printing contract even if he had to "buy up Barstow and the balance." The phrase stuck with Barstow for the rest of his career.

He fought a bitter campaign in the Democratic caucuses attempting to earn renomination, but, at the State Convention in 1851, he was defeated on the third ballot by Charles D. Robinson, of Brown County.

=== Wisconsin Governor ===
In 1852, Barstow's reputation had sufficiently recovered to represent Wisconsin at the 1852 Democratic National Convention in Baltimore. But his legal controversies continued, and, during the 1853 legislative session, Barstow's name was associated with several corrupt acts charged in the impeachment of Wisconsin Circuit Court Judge Levi Hubbell, and gave a deposition to the Legislature under subpoena. Hubbell was acquitted, however, and no new charges were brought against Barstow.

The same legislative session, however, also passed a temperance law based on the Maine Liquor Law, creating a statewide referendum on the question. Barstow became a vocal opponent of the act, speaking against it around the state. Through the summer of 1853, he was a nominal supporter of A. Hyatt Smith to receive the Democratic nomination for Governor and participated in several party meetings and caucuses in which delegates were selected. At the state convention, however, as Smith was unable to reach a majority after 7 ballots, he dropped out of the race and encouraged his delegates to support Barstow. Barstow was nominated on the 11th ballot, narrowly defeating Jairus C. Fairchild. The convention also adopted a resolution calling for the defeat of the temperance law.

In the November 1853 general election, Barstow faced off against Free Soil candidate Edward D. Holton for the third time, defeating him again and earning 54% of the statewide vote. Governor Barstow was sworn in on January 2, 1854. As governor, Barstow supported the railroad to the Pacific and stood against the attempts of the Know-Nothing movement to undermine the citizenship of the foreign-born or slow down immigration. As promised, he opposed and vetoed the temperance law, despite the fact that the referendum had demonstrated popular support for the measure.

However, allegations of financial impropriety emerged again, this time related to the use of public school funds and improper influence on state-backed loans and other expenses appropriated by his allies in the Democrat-dominated 1854 Legislature. Although he was able to secure renomination by the Democrats in 1853, Barstow lost support within his party as well as in Wisconsin generally.

=== Disputed election ===
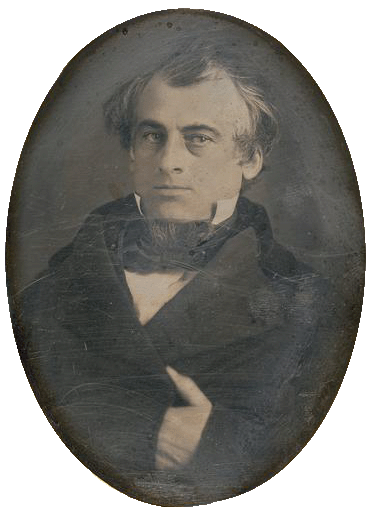
William A. Barstow in 1853

When Barstow ran for reelection in 1855, he was initially declared the winner over his Republican opponent, Coles Bashford, by a mere 157 votes. However, Bashford claimed the result was fraudulent, and it was soon substantiated that Barstow's win was due to forged election returns from nonexistent precincts in the sparsely populated northern part of the state, in addition to other irregularities such as two separate canvassing boards claiming legitimacy in Waupaca County and attempting to submit conflicting certifications.

As rival militia units converged on the state capital in Madison, threatening to start a civil war within the state, Barstow was inaugurated in a full, public ceremony on January 7, 1856. On the same day, Bashford was also sworn in quietly as governor in the chambers of the Wisconsin Supreme Court by Chief Justice Edward V. Whiton.

The Wisconsin Attorney General, George Baldwin Smith, filed quo warranto proceedings in the Wisconsin Supreme Court to remove Barstow, who threatened that he would not "give up his office alive." After challenging the court's jurisdiction without success and noting that the tide of public opinion had turned against him, Barstow declined to contest the fraud allegations and sent his resignation to the legislature on March 21, 1856, leaving the lieutenant governor, Arthur MacArthur, as acting governor. On March 24, the court unanimously awarded the governorship to Bashford by a count of 1,009 votes in the case Atty. Gen. ex rel. Bashford v. Barstow.

== Later life ==
Barstow moved to Janesville, Wisconsin, where he opened a bank and promoted various railroad construction schemes, becoming president of the St. Croix and Lake Superior Railroad. His business ventures were mostly unsuccessful as his bank failed in the Panic of 1857, and his railroad company was consumed in another bribery scandal. He remained involved in Democratic politics, however, and served as a Wisconsin delegate to the Democratic National Conventions in 1860, where he worked for the nomination and election of Stephen A. Douglas.

== Civil War service ==
After the outbreak of the American Civil War, Barstow wrote to General John C. Frémont, who had been named commander of the Department of the West, and offered to raise a regiment of cavalry. In the intervening months, the United States Department of War reduced their request for additional volunteer cavalry regiments and revoked the authorization for Barstow's regiment, but, after appeals from Barstow and Governor Alexander Randall, demonstrating that the regiment was nearly complete, the War Department restored his authority. The 3rd Wisconsin Cavalry Regiment mustered into the service of the Union Army under Colonel William Barstow on January 31, 1862, at Camp Barstow, near Janesville, and left the state on March 26, proceeding to St. Louis.

Shortly after their arrival at St. Louis, Colonel Barstow was named Provost Marshal of Kansas and the regiment was distributed around the state on provost duty. For most of his term in this role, Colonel Barstow operated out of Fort Leavenworth. Just months after starting his service, Colonel Barstow was struck by illness and, after struggling for several months, he accepted reassignment in the summer of 1863 to preside over courts-martial at St. Louis, Missouri. He was mustered out of the service on March 4, 1865, and received a retroactive promotion to brigadier general of volunteers on March 13, 1865.

== Death ==
He returned to Leavenworth, Kansas, after leaving federal service and bid for a contract on the state prison. Two of his sons also relocated to the city. His health had continued to decline through his years in the war, suffering from chronic diarrhea. He died at Leavenworth on December 13, 1865.

== Family and legacy ==
William A. Barstow was married to Maria Quarles of Kenosha, Wisconsin. They had four sons.

Barstow was the son of William Augusta Barstow and Sally Hall Barstow. His Uncles John and Ebenezer Barstow were volunteers in the Continental Army in the American Revolutionary War. Ebenezer Barstow's grandson, John L. Barstow, was the 39th Governor of Vermont.

Barstow Street in downtown Waukesha, Wisconsin, is named for him.

== Electoral history ==
=== Wisconsin Secretary of State (1849) ===
Wisconsin Secretary of State Election, 1849
Party	Candidate	Votes	%	±%
General Election, November 6, 1849
Democratic	William A. Barstow	16,814	53.75%	
Whig	Levi Alden	10,703	34.21%	
Free Soil	Edward D. Holton	3,767	12.04%	
Plurality		6,111	19.53%	
Total votes		31,284	100.0%	
Democratic hold				

=== Wisconsin Governor (1853, 1855) ===
Wisconsin Gubernatorial Election, 1853
Party	Candidate	Votes	%	±%
General Election, November 8, 1853
Democratic	William A. Barstow	30,405	54.60%	+5.24%
Free Soil	Edward D. Holton	21,886	39.31%	
Whig	Henry S. Baird	3,304	5.93%	−44.57%
	Scattering	88	0.16%	
Plurality		8,519	15.30%	+14.15%
Total votes		55,683	100.0%	+26.01%
Democratic gain from Whig		Swing	49.82%	

Wisconsin Gubernatorial Election, 1855
Party	Candidate	Votes	%	±%
General Election, November 6, 1855
Republican	Coles Bashford	36,198	49.86%	
Democratic	William A. Barstow (incumbent)	36,355	50.08%	−4.53%
	Scattering	45	0.06%	
Total votes		72,598	100.0%	+30.38%
Republican gain from Democratic				

== See also ==
- 3rd Wisconsin Cavalry Regiment
- List of governors of Wisconsin
- 1855 Wisconsin gubernatorial election

Military offices
Regiment created	Command of the 3rd Wisconsin Volunteer Cavalry Regiment; January 31, 1862 – March 9, 1865	Succeeded by Thomas Derry
Party political offices
Preceded by Thomas McHugh	Democratic nominee for Secretary of State of Wisconsin; 1849	Succeeded by Charles D. Robinson
Preceded by Don A. J. Upham	Democratic nominee for Governor of Wisconsin; 1853, 1855	Succeeded by James B. Cross
Political offices
Preceded by Thomas McHugh	Secretary of State of Wisconsin; January 7, 1850 – January 5, 1852	Succeeded by Charles Robinson
Preceded by Leonard J. Farwell	Governor of Wisconsin; January 2, 1854 – March 21, 1856	Succeeded by Arthur MacArthur Sr.
