= Messitte =

Messitte is a surname. Notable people with the surname include:

- Peter J. Messitte (1941–2025), American judge
- Zach P. Messitte (born 1968), American political scientist, commentator, author and academic administrator
