= David C. Joyce =

American university administrator

David Joyce

13th president of Brevard College
- Incumbent
- Assumed office January 1, 2012

12th president of Ripon College
- In office 2003–2011
- Succeeded by: Zach P. Messitte

President of Union College
- In office 1996–2003
- Succeeded by: Zach P. Messitte

Personal details
- Education: Pfeiffer University (B.A.); Yale Divinity School (M.Div.); North Carolina State University (M.S.); Vanderbilt University (Ph.D.)

David C. Joyce is an American academic administrator currently serving as the president of Brevard College in Brevard, North Carolina. He took office as the 13th president on January 1, 2012.

== Education ==
Joyce holds a bachelor's degree in psychology from Pfeiffer University, a master of divinity in pastoral psychology from the Yale Divinity School, a Master of Science in psychology from North Carolina State University, and a doctorate in human resource development from Vanderbilt University.

== Career ==
He has more than 30 years of experience in private higher education. Prior to 1996, Joyce was vice president for institutional advancement at Otterbein University. From 1996 to 2003, he was president of Union College in Barbourville, Kentucky. From 2003 to 2011, he served as president of Ripon College in Ripon, Wisconsin.

He has been involved in development and fund-raising at the Western North Carolina Conference of the United Methodist Church, Vanderbilt Divinity School, and Pfeiffer University. He also served as assistant dean of students at Elon University in North Carolina.

He is an ordained elder in the United Methodist Church and is a member of the National Association of Schools and Colleges of the United Methodist Church. Joyce is also involved in the American Council on Education; the Council for the Advancement and Support of Education; and the Council of Independent Colleges. He serves on the Presidents' Advisory Committee of the Corella and Bertram F. Bonner Foundation and the National Association of Independent Colleges and Universities and is a member of the Reauthorization Task Force on Student Financial Aid.

He announced his retirement and will leave the presidency of Brevard College on Dec. 31, 2021.
