= Little White Schoolhouse =

- U.S. National Register of Historic Places
- U.S. National Historic Landmark
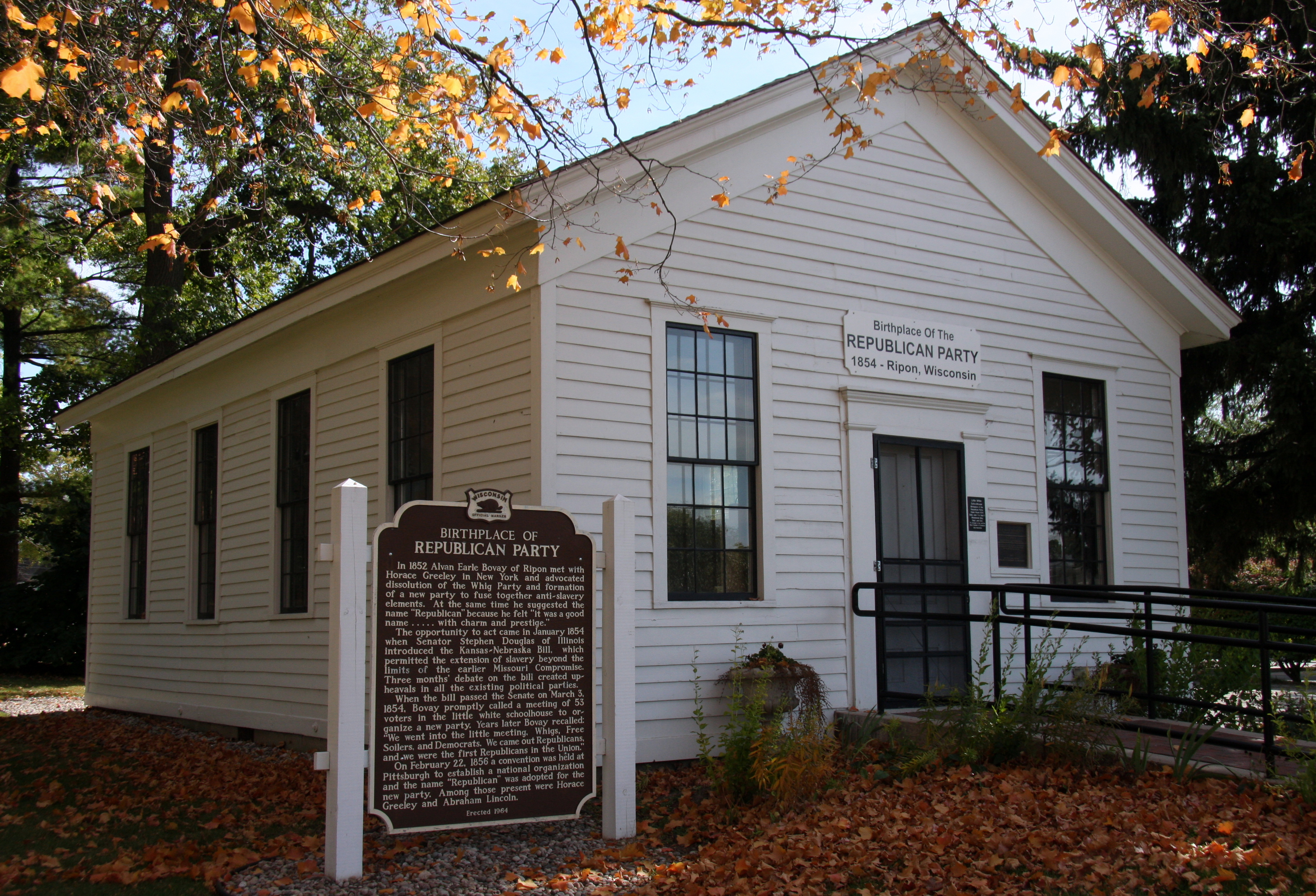
- The Little White Schoolhouse in 2013

- Location within Wisconsin Location within the United States
- Interactive map showing the location for Little White Schoolhouse
- Location: 1074 W. Fond du Lac Street, Ripon, Wisconsin
- Coordinates: 43.8529°N 88.8576°W
- Built: 1854
- NRHP reference No.: 73000079, 100010533

Significant dates
- Added to NRHP: August 14, 1973; renewed July 22, 2024
- Designated NHL: May 30, 1974

The Republican Schoolhouse, also known as Little White Schoolhouse or Birthplace of the Republican Party, is a historic former one-room schoolhouse now located at 1074 West Fond Du Lac Street, in Ripon, Wisconsin. Built in 1853, it was designated a National Historic Landmark for its role in the 1854 founding of the Republican Party. It is now a local history museum.

== History ==
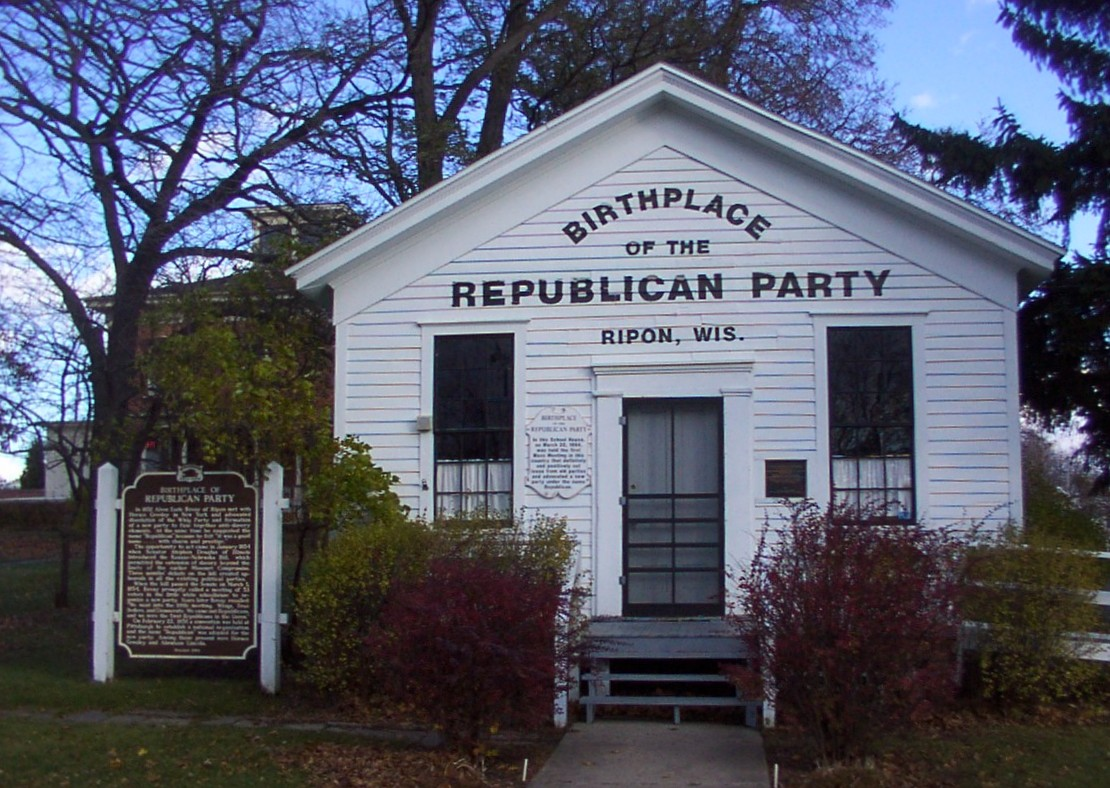
The schoolhouse in 2004, before its 2005 renovation

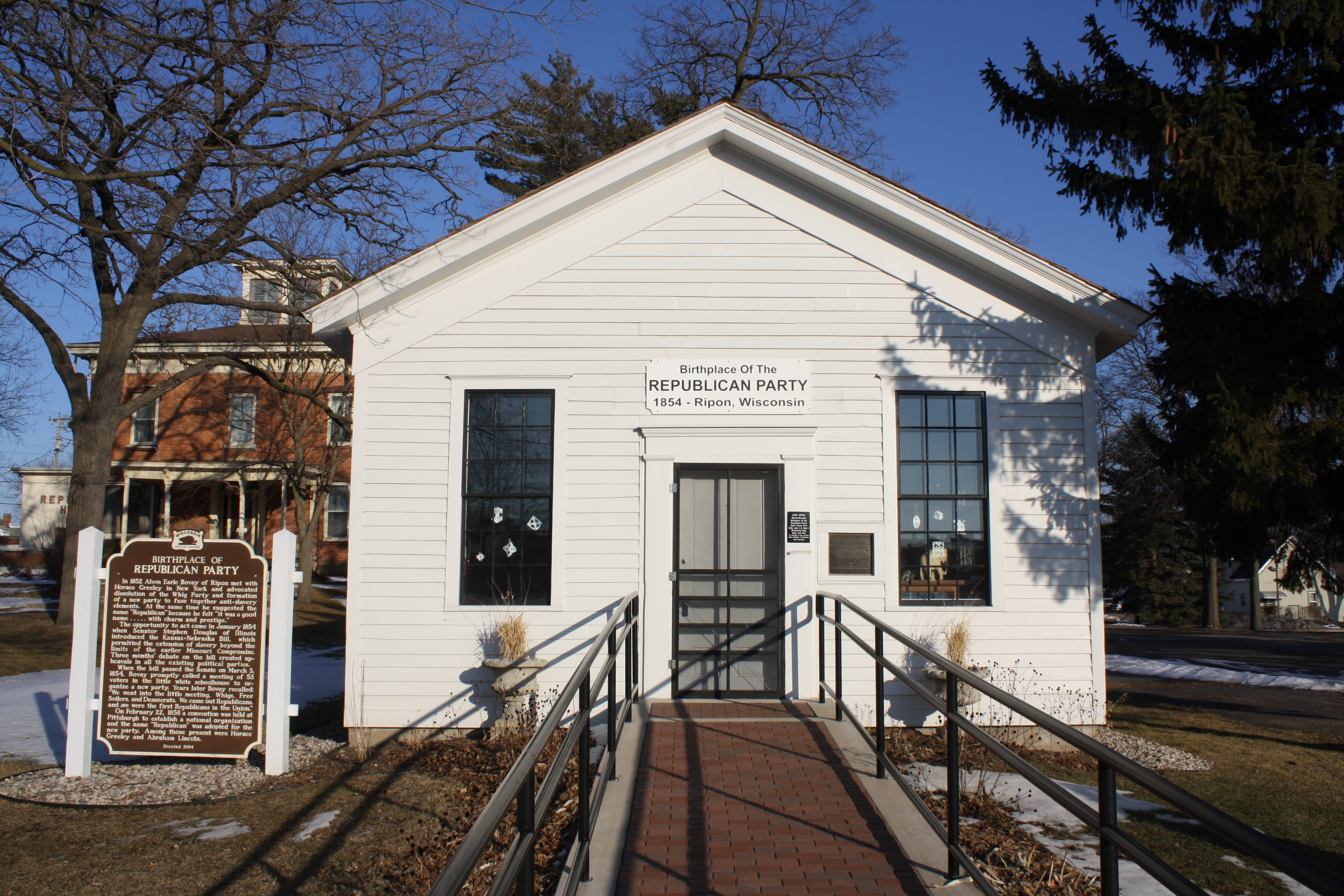
The schoolhouse in 2012, after its 2005 renovation

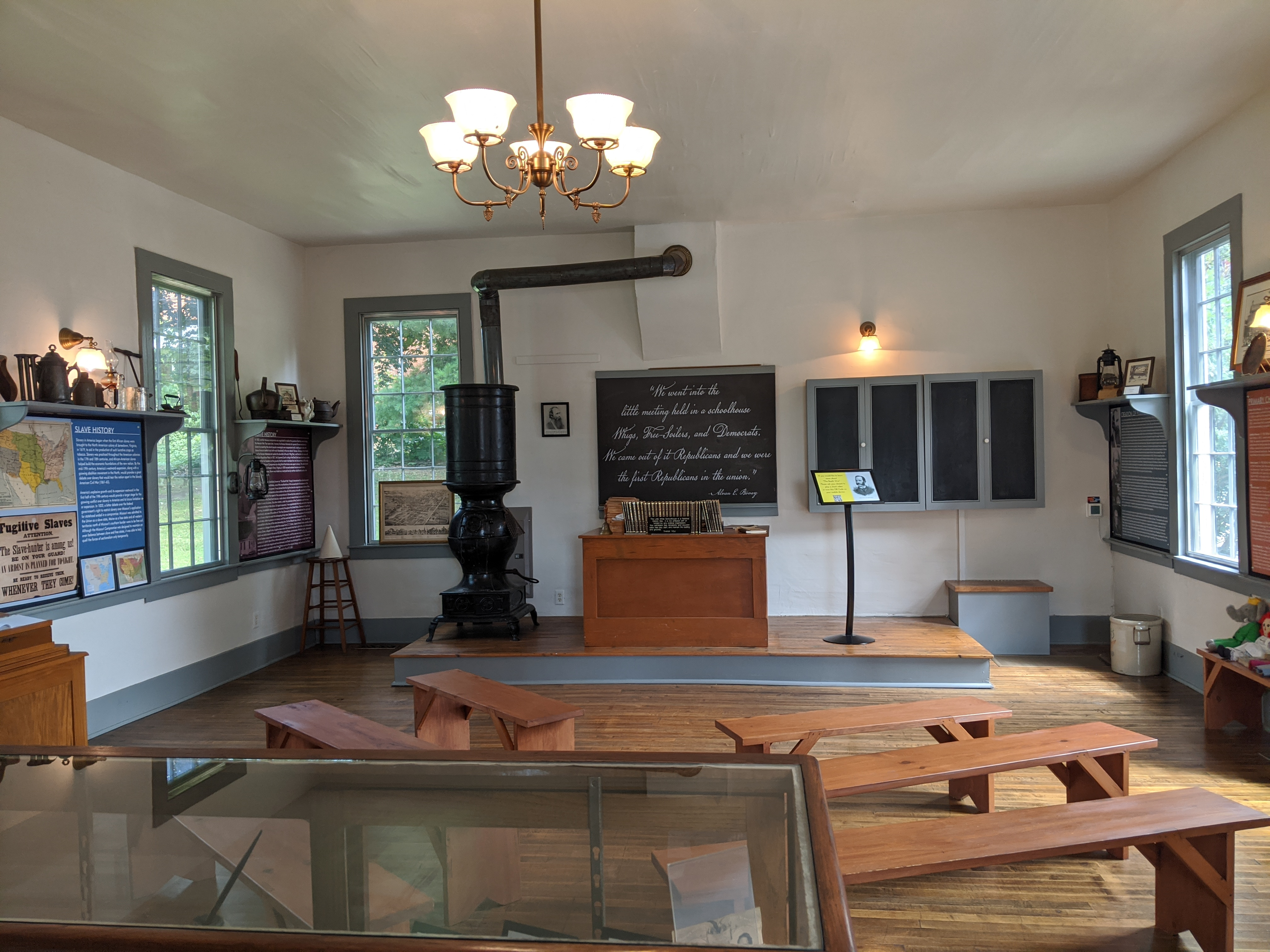
Interior of the schoolhouse in 2020

=== Construction ===
The structure was built in its original location in 1853, as a school. It was championed as part of a wider education initiative by a New York transplant, Alvan Bovay. Bovay used his position in founding the school to further involve himself in politics, becoming a founder of the Republican Party, which formed during a meeting at the schoolhouse.

The building is a single-story wood frame structure, with a gabled roof and clapboarded exterior. It has modest Greek Revival styling, with a single entrance framed by pilasters and an entablature with cornice. There are sash windows on either side of the entrance.

=== Politics ===
In 1854, opposition grew to the proposed Kansas–Nebraska Bill which threatened to allow slavery to expand into territories north of the Missouri Compromise line. The bill was championed by the dominant Democratic Party, and the opposition was split among several smaller parties, including the Whig Party, the Free Soil Party, and some internal Democratic Party splintering. In Ripon, Bovay, who had gotten the schoolhouse built, led the opposition, and canvassed support among opposition members of all the local parties. He called a meeting on March 20. The Whig and Free Soil parties dissolved themselves in favor of forming a new, united party to be called "Republican," with some Democrats also defecting from their local party branch to join the new party. With publicity from the New York Tribune, word of the party spread, other local chapters and state-level parties started forming by July or earlier, and a national party was formed by 1856.

== Preservation ==
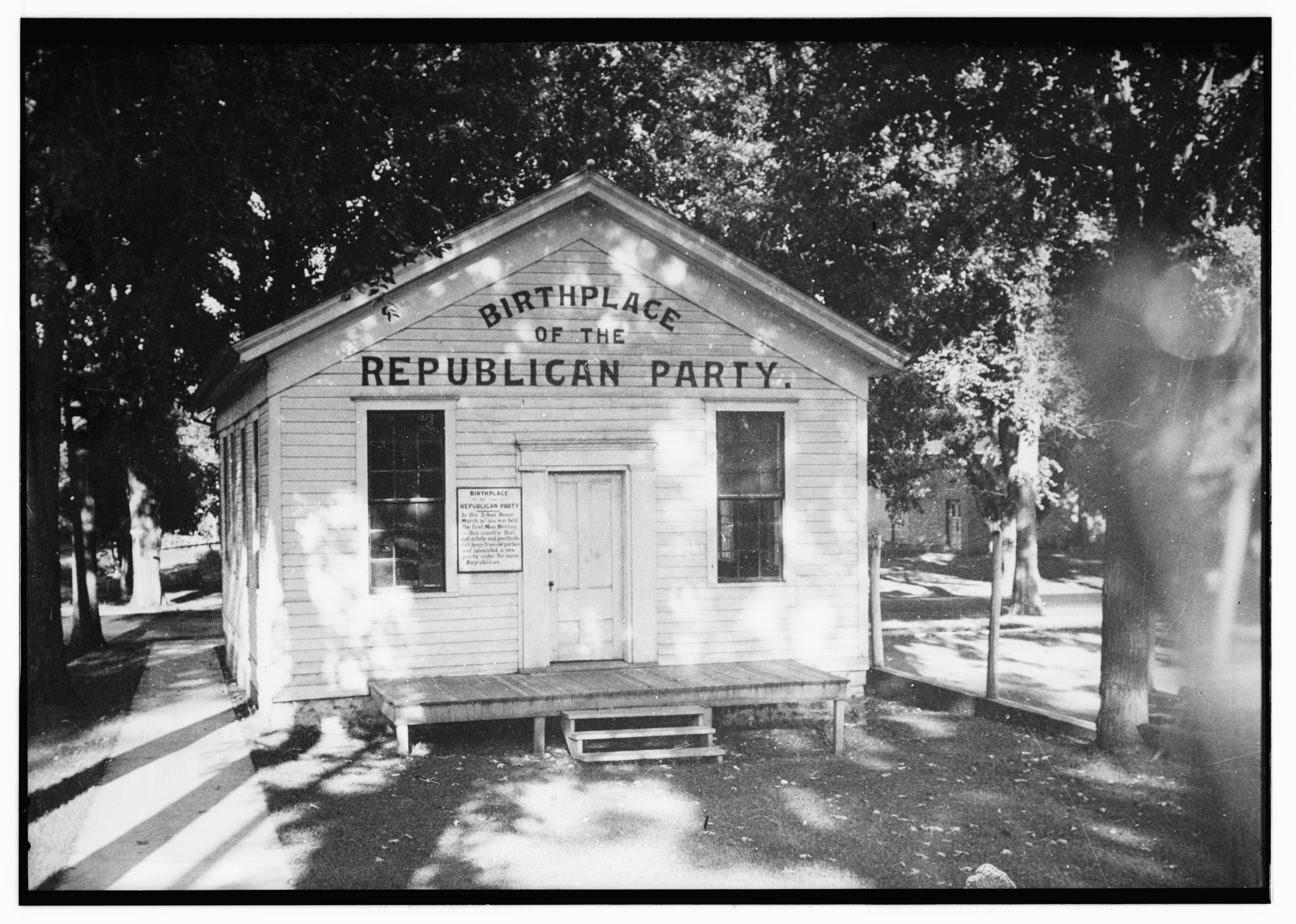
Original building, photo taken in 1936

The town quickly outgrew the small building, and built a larger brick building to replace it. The old building was sold to Wisconsin governor George Peck, for use as a home. By the early 20th century, it had fallen into disuse, and was in danger of being demolished. Due to its historical significance, effort was put into saving the building.

Local civic and historical organizations, considering its local and national historical significance, raised funds to save it. The building was refurbished, and moved to the campus of Ripon College. Later, it was moved twice more to other locations on campus.

Its fourth move, in 1951, was to its previous location, where it would stay for the next 72 years.

Twenty-two years later, it was recognized it as a historic site by the United States National Park Service, which declared it a National Historic Landmark in 1974. From 2005 to 2007, the house underwent a renovation.

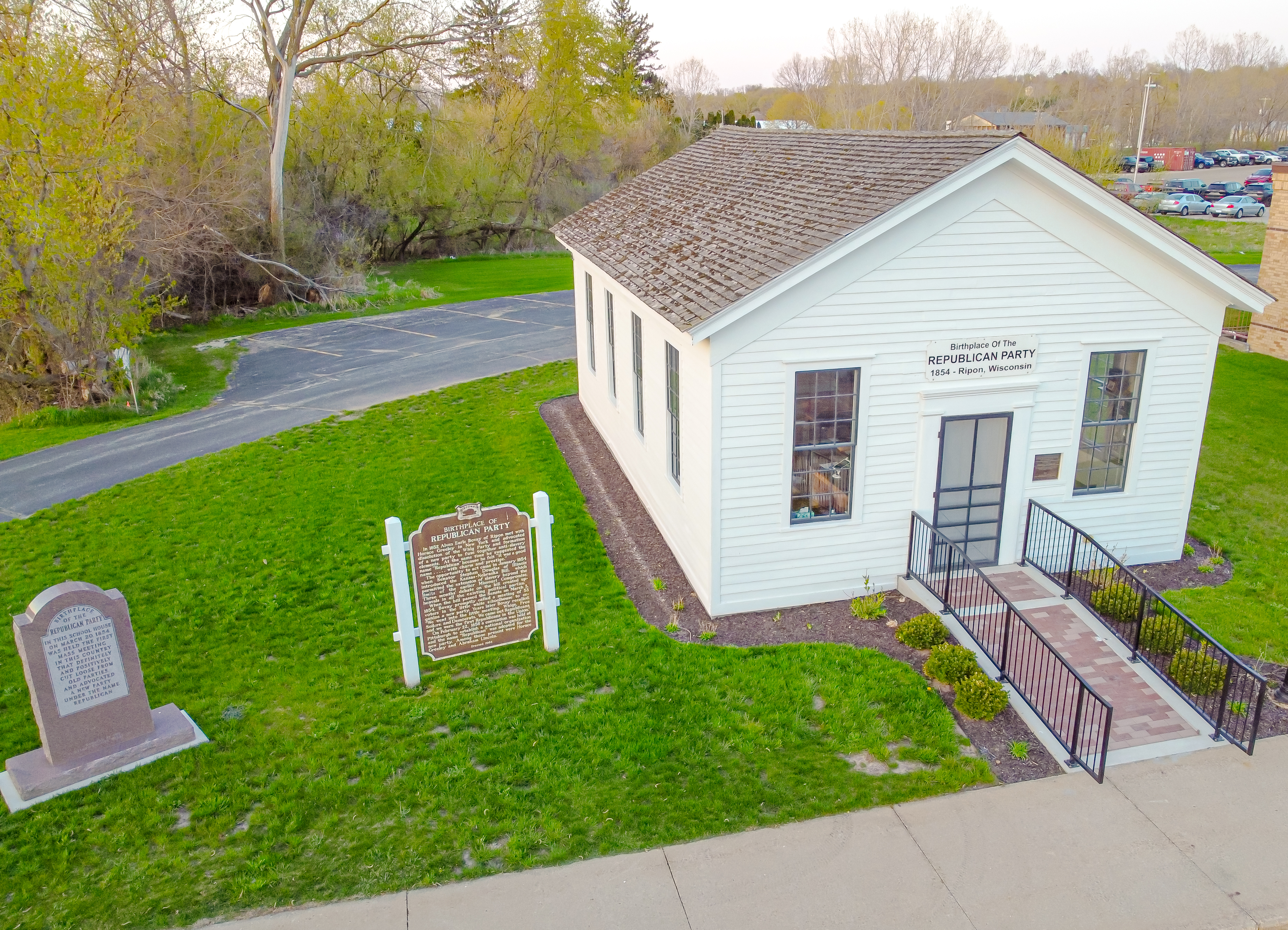
The Little White Schoolhouse in 2024

The Ripon Chamber of Commerce, owner of the building, had the building moved a fifth time, on April 17, 2023, to make room for a Boys and Girls club. The move caused the Little White Schoolhouse's status on the National Register of Historic Places to be endangered. As of April 21, 2023, the status was under review. A relisting of the property at its new location was approved in 2024.

== See also ==
- List of National Historic Landmarks in Wisconsin
- National Register of Historic Places listings in Fond du Lac County, Wisconsin
- History of the Republican Party
