= WRPN =

WRPN may refer to:

- WRPN (AM), a radio station (1600 AM) licensed to Ripon, Wisconsin, United States
- WRPN-FM, a defunct radio station (90.1 FM) formerly licensed to Ripon, Wisconsin, United States
