= Arcade Acres, Wisconsin =

- Unincorporated community
- Location within Wisconsin Location within the United States
- Coordinates: 43°51′31″N 88°52′15″W
- Country: United States
- State: Wisconsin
- County: Fond du Lac
- Elevation: 810 ft (250 m)
- Time zone: UTC-6 (Central (CST))
  - Summer (DST): UTC-5 (CDT)
- Area code: 920
- GNIS feature ID: 1560924

Arcade Acres is an unincorporated community located in the town of Ripon, Fond du Lac County, Wisconsin, United States. Arcade Acres is 2 miles (3.2 km) northwest of Ripon.
