= Bradish =

Bradish is a surname. Notable people with the surname include:

- Alvah Bradish (1806–1901), American portrait painter and professor
- Charles Richard Bradish (1884–1961), Australian journalist
- Joseph Bradish (1672–1700), English pirate
- Kyle Bradish (born 1996), American baseball player
- Luther Bradish (1783–1863), American lawyer and politician
- Sarah Powers Bradish (1867–1922), American writer and temperance activist
