= Ezekiel Babcock =

American politician (1828–1905)

Member of the Wisconsin State Assembly
- In office 1882

Personal details
- Born: August 22, 1828 Westerlo, New York, U.S.
- Died: April 16, 1905 (aged 76)
- Party: Republican
- Occupation: Politician, farmer

Ezekiel Babcock (August 22, 1828 – April 16, 1905) was an American farmer and politician.

Born in Westerlo, New York, Babcock moved to Ceresco, Wisconsin (now Ripon, Wisconsin) in 1852. He was a farmer and served as chairman of the Ripon Town Board. In 1882, Babcock served in the Wisconsin State Assembly and was a Republican.
