= Sarah Powers Bradish =

Writer

- Born: Sarah E. Powers; 1867
- Died: 1922 (aged 54–55)
- Education: Ripon College, (B. A., 1871)
- Occupations: Writer, temperance activist
- Known for: Writing on Norse mythology
- Spouse: James H. Bradish
- Children: Bertha and Herman
- Parent: Moses H. Powers of Green Lake, Wisconsin

Sarah Powers Bradish (1867–1922) was an American writer. She is known for her textbook Old Norse Stories, published in 1900, and a memoir titled ... Stories of Country Life.

Sarah Powers Bradish is also known for her service as Wisconsin State Secretary of the Woman's Christian Temperance Union.

She was a graduate of Ripon College and traveled extensively in Europe. She traveled in England and France from 1872 to 1873. She resided in Dartford, Wisconsin, from 1873 to 1874; in Ripon, Wisconsin, from 1874 to 1875; and in Minneapolis, Minnesota, from 1875 to 1894.

Her husband, James H. Bradish, also attended Ripon College. He became assistant general solicitor of the Minneapolis, St. Paul & Sault Ste. Marie Railroad Company, and a Minneapolis alderman. The couple had two children, Bertha and Herman.

== Works ==
- Bradish, Sarah Powers (1900). Old Norse stories. New York: American Book Company.
- Bradish, Sarah Powers (1901). ... Stories of country life. New York: American Book Company.
