= Gard Miller =

American politician

Gard Miller was a member of the Wisconsin State Assembly.

== Biography ==
Miller was born in 1851. A resident of Ripon, Wisconsin, he was a farmer by trade.

== Assembly career ==
Miller was a Republican member of the Assembly during the 1905 session.
