= Arthur F. Hinz =

American politician

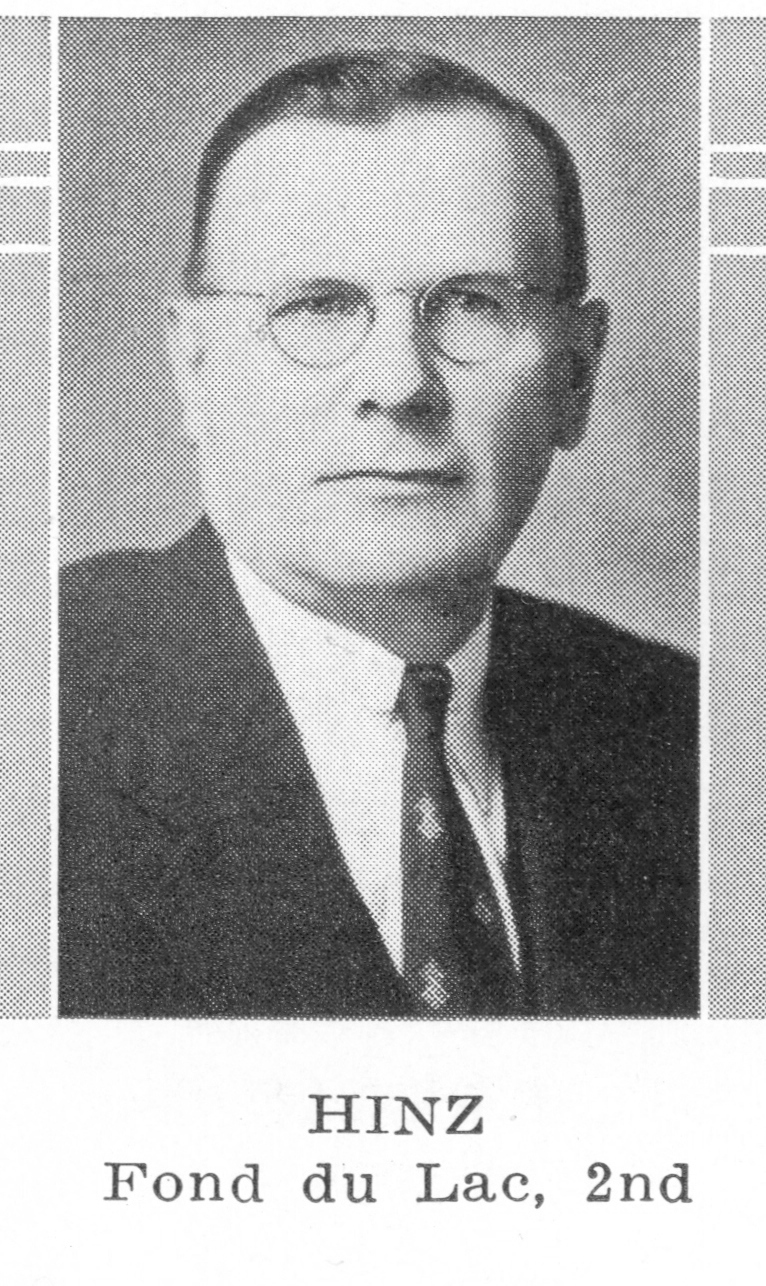
Arthur F. Hinz

Arthur Frederick Hinz (March 28, 1886 – March 14, 1969) was a member of the Wisconsin State Assembly.

== Biography ==
Hinz was born on March 28, 1886, in Fond du Lac County, Wisconsin. He attended Ripon High School in Ripon, Wisconsin, before graduating from the University of Wisconsin-Madison. He was a farmer. Hinz died in Ripon, Wisconsin, on March 14, 1969.

== Career ==
Hinz was a member of the Assembly from 1937 to 1940. In addition, he was assessor and a member of the City Council of Ripon. He was a Republican.
