= WRPN-FM =

Ripon, Wisconsin, U.S.; United States
- Frequency: 90.1 MHz

Programming
- Format: Student radio
- Affiliations: None

Ownership
- Owner: Ripon College; (Ripon College Board of Trustees)
- Sister stations: None

History
- First air date: 1961
- Last air date: 2014
- Former call signs: None
- Call sign meaning: RiPoN

Technical information
- Facility ID: 65450
- Class: A
- ERP: 230 watts
- HAAT: 44 meters (144 ft)
- Transmitter coordinates: 43°50′37″N 88°50′31″W

Links
- Website: riponmedia.com/wrpn-radio/

WRPN-FM (90.1 FM), was a student-run College radio station at Ripon College. Licensed to Ripon, Wisconsin, the station was owned by Ripon College.

WRPN-FM was the result of efforts spearheaded by speech instructor Howard Hanson. According to a profile of the radio station in Ripon Magazine, Hanson presented a prospectus for a student-run radio station to college administrators in 1955. He wanted an organization that would serve "as a public voice of the College and as a student-training laboratory." He wanted a "truly educational station," one that did not compete program-wise with the commercial radio stations serving the Ripon area.

By the fall of 1956, a group of students had secured equipment and expertise in AM closed carrier circuit system broadcasting to begin to offer programming on 570 on the AM dial. The service was offered through phone lines. It was only available in the dorms. The studio was located in what was known as Tracey House on the corner of Thorne and Ransom Streets in Ripon.

The experiment had its up and downs, with a letter authored by station management in the fall of 1960 and distributed to students, faculty, and administrators declaring the station dead due to technical difficulties and staffing issues. Months later, a group of students had revived the organization and the station was back on the air.

The FCC granted the College's request for a low-powered educational FM radio station in November 1960. WRPN-FM signed on in February 1961, thanks to donated equipment.

By this time, the station's studios had moved to Middle Hall (now known as Smith Hall). A 110-foot tower was constructed behind the building. The station operated at 10-watt power. The FM signal allowed the entire campus and Ripon community to hear the station's programming.

In the years that followed, there were many noteworthy ebbs and flows. The highs included 24-hour music and entertainment programming, the expansion of live coverage of sports and campus events, and several awards for broadcast excellence. The lows included unreliable technology, less student interest, and battles with administrators over control and programming.

In its final years, the station's studios were located on the top level of the Harwood Memorial Union. The station's tower was located outside that building.

A 2004 article in the Ripon College Days stated the FCC had granted approval for the station to increase its operating to power to 550 watts, but that power increase never happened.

In September 2014, the broadcast license for WRPN-FM was returned by the College and deleted by the FCC. Despite losing its FCC license, WRPN now operates as an online streaming radio station.
