= Roy E. Reed =

American politician

Roy Edwin Reed (March 26, 1877 – August 21, 1943) was an American lawyer and politician.

Reed was born in Ripon, Wisconsin and was a prominent bicycle racer in his youth. Reed went to University of Wisconsin and received his law degree. He practiced law in Ripon and was the city attorney. In 1911, Reed served in the Wisconsin State Assembly and was active in the Republican Party. During his term, he introduced a bill to legalize advertising in newspapers on Sundays, which had been prohibited by Wisconsin's blue laws. During World War I, Reed served in the Red Cross in Europe. He served in the Wisconsin Personnel Board during the administration of Wisconsin Governor Julius Heil; however, Reed resigned from the board because of policy differences with Heil. Reed died of a heart attack at his home in Ripon, Wisconsin.
