= Zach P. Messitte =

American political scientist (born 1968)

Zach Messitte

13th President of Ripon College
- In office September 29, 2012 – 2022
- Preceded by: David C. Joyce
- Succeeded by: Victoria N. Folse

Personal details
- Born: Zachariah Paulo Messitte; June 24, 1968 (age 58) Sao Paulo, Brazil
- Education: Bowdoin College (BA); Johns Hopkins University (MA); New York University (PhD)

Zachariah Paulo Messitte (born June 24, 1968) is an American political scientist, commentator, author, and academic administrator. He served as the 13th president of Ripon College in Ripon, Wisconsin from 2012-2022. He is currently an Executive Director in the Social Impact and Education practice at Russell Reynolds Associates and based in Washington, D.C. He concurrently serves as the Chair of the Board of Visitors of the David L. Boren College of International Studies at the University of Oklahoma and is a member of the Beloit College (Wisconsin) Board of Trustees. He also is an adviser to the Supernova project in Rome, Italy that showcases Italian and international artists in a site-specific space on the Piazza Santa Maria in Trastevere.

== Early life and education ==
Messitte was born in Sao Paulo, Brazil while his parents were serving in the Peace Corps. He grew up in Chevy Chase, Maryland, where he graduated from Bethesda-Chevy Chase High School. He then earned a Bachelor of Arts degree in American history and Italian language from Bowdoin College in 1990. He established two Italian awards at Bowdoin in 2010. Messitte received a Master of Arts in international relations from Johns Hopkins University and a doctorate in politics from New York University.

== Career ==
Messitte was appointed to the political science faculty and named director of the Center for the Study of Democracy at St. Mary's College of Maryland in 2002. In 2007, he was named Vice Provost for International Programs and awarded the William J. Crowe Chair in Geopolitics at the University of Oklahoma. He later became the first Dean of the University of Oklahoma College of International Studies.

Former CIA Director George Tenet gave the keynote address at Messitte's inauguration as President of Ripon College on September 29, 2012.

He has written academic articles and guest columns for The New York Times, Washington Post, Los Angeles Times, Milwaukee Journal Sentinel, and Baltimore Sun. Messitte is the co-editor of Buon Giorno, Arezzo: A Postcard from Tuscany and Understanding the Global Community. He is also the co-author of Republican Populist: Spiro Agnew and the Origins of Donald Trump's America.

Prior to his career in academia, Messitte worked as a researcher and producer at CNN for national correspondent Judy Woodruff, as a press spokesman for the U.S. Senate Select Committee on Intelligence, and as a public information officer for the United Nations in New York and in Vienna, Austria, where he helped develop the Basketball Without Borders cultural program in collaboration with the National Basketball Association.
