= Ripon (town), Wisconsin =

Ripon, Wisconsin
- Town
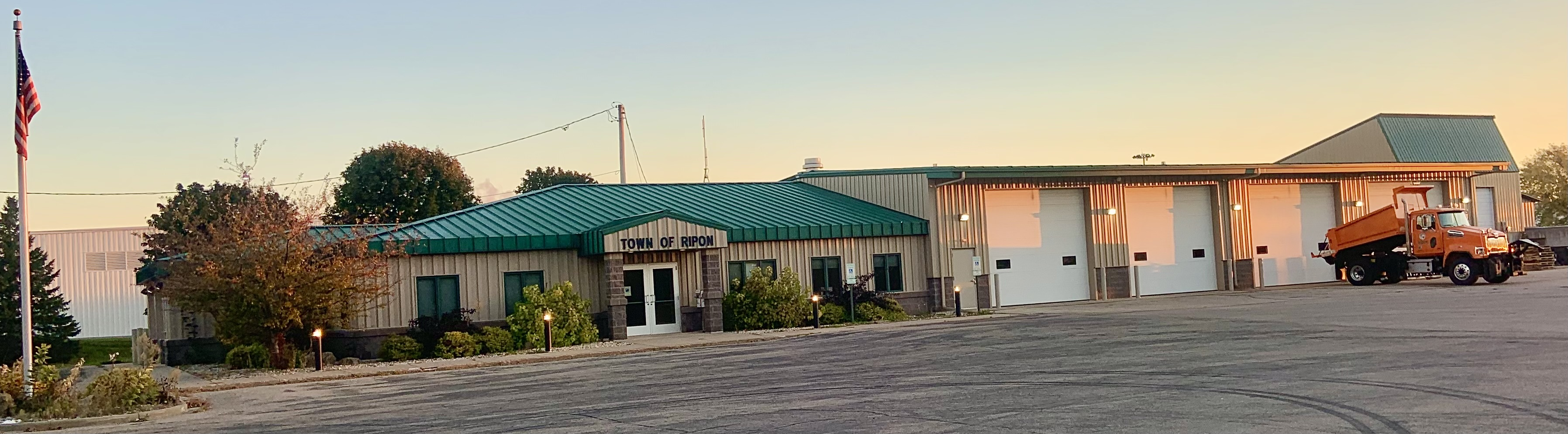
- Town hall

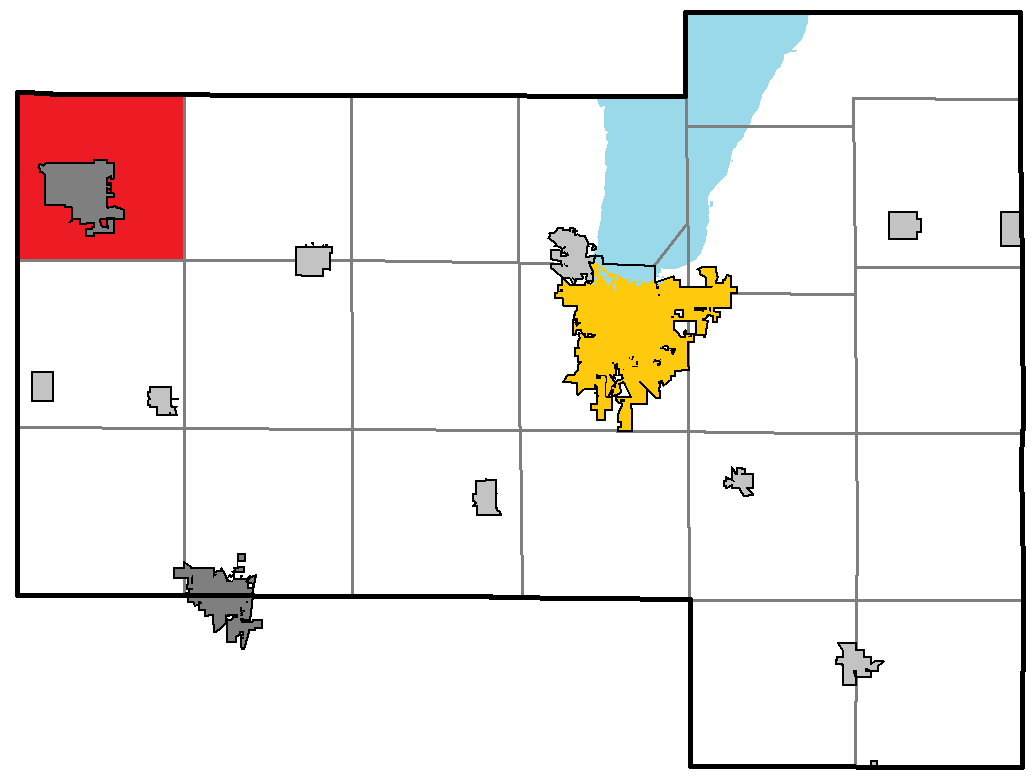
- Location of Ripon (town), within Fond du Lac County
- Coordinates: 43°51′57″N 88°50′7″W
- Country: United States
- State: Wisconsin
- County: Fond du Lac

Area
  - Total: 32.0 sq mi (82.8 km^{2})
  - Land: 31.8 sq mi (82.4 km^{2})
  - Water: 0.15 sq mi (0.4 km^{2})
- Elevation: 958 ft (292 m)

Population (2020)
  - Total: 1,314
  - Density: 41.3/sq mi (15.9/km^{2})
- Time zone: UTC-6 (Central (CST))
  - Summer (DST): UTC-5 (CDT)
- Area code: 920
- FIPS code: 55-68200
- GNIS feature ID: 1584040

Ripon is a town in Fond du Lac County, Wisconsin, United States. The population was 1,314 at the 2020 census. The unincorporated communities of Arcade Acres and Wilmoore Heights are located in the town.

== Geography ==
According to the United States Census Bureau, the town has a total area of 32.0 square miles (82.8 km^{2}), of which 31.8 square miles (82.4 km^{2}) is land and 0.2 square mile (0.4 km^{2}) (0.47%) is water.

== Demographics ==
As of the census of 2000, there were 2,001 people, 507 households, and 400 families residing in the town. The population density was 62.9 people per square mile (24.3/km^{2}). There were 522 housing units at an average density of 16.4 per square mile (6.3/km^{2}). The racial makeup of the town was 96.75% White, 0.75% Black or African American, 0.40% Native American, 0.65% Asian, 0.10% Pacific Islander, 0.50% from other races, and 0.85% from two or more races. 2.30% of the population were Hispanic or Latino of any race.

There were 507 households, out of which 37.9% had children under the age of 18 living with them, 69.6% were married couples living together, 5.3% had a female householder with no husband present, and 21.1% were non-families. 17.2% of all households were made up of individuals, and 7.5% had someone living alone who was 65 years of age or older. The average household size was 2.72 and the average family size was 3.08.

In the town, the population was spread out, with 18.9% under the age of 18, 35.0% from 18 to 24, 19.7% from 25 to 44, 18.6% from 45 to 64, and 7.7% who were 65 years of age or older. The median age was 22 years. For every 100 females, there were 103.4 males. For every 100 females age 18 and over, there were 105.2 males.

The median income for a household in the town was $49,323, and the median income for a family was $54,485. Males had a median income of $35,500 versus $20,878 for females. The per capita income for the town was $15,591. About 7.4% of families and 8.8% of the population were below the poverty line, including 7.7% of those under age 18 and 8.6% of those age 65 or over.
