= Ripon College (Wisconsin) =

Private liberal arts college in Ripon, Wisconsin, US

- Former name: Brockway College (1851–1863)
- Motto: Fides Christi Scientia
- Motto in English: Faith in Christ is Knowledge
- Type: Private liberal arts college
- Established: 1851; 175 years ago
- Endowment: $108.1 million (2021)
- President: Victoria N. Folse
- Students: 754 (2024)
- Location: Ripon, Wisconsin, U.S. 43.8436°N 88.8413°W
- Campus: Small town, 250 acres (100 ha)
- Colors: Red and Black
- Nickname: Red Hawks
- Sporting affiliations: NCAA Division III – Midwest Conference
- Mascot: Rally the Red Hawk
- Website: ripon.edu

Ripon College is a private liberal arts college in Ripon, Wisconsin, United States. As of 2024, the college enrolled around 754 undergraduate students. Nearly 80% of students were Wisconsin residents.

== History ==
Ripon College was founded in 1851, although its first class of students did not enroll until 1853. It was first known as Brockway College, named for William S. Brockway, who gave the most, $25, in a fundraising effort.

Ripon's first class, four women, graduated in 1867. The college was founded with ties to local churches, but early in its history the institution became secular. In 1868, formal ties with Presbyterian and Congregational churches were cut, but Ripon would retain some ties to its religious past. During the nineteenth century, students were required to attend two church services each Sunday. The first six presidents of Ripon College had clerical backgrounds. Today, students are not required to attend religious services.

The National Forensic League was founded at the college in 1925.

== Academics ==
Students may choose from 31 majors, a variety of pre-professional advising options and also opt to self-design a major. Off-campus study is highly encouraged; nearly one-third of all Ripon College students elect to spend a semester off-campus on a focused area of study. Ripon has a student-to-faculty ratio of 14:1.

=== Catalyst Curriculum ===
Students take five Catalyst courses that focus on solving real-world problems. The Catalyst curriculum consists of five seminars spread over three years. After completing the Catalyst curriculum, students receive a certificate in Applied Innovation. Ripon College provides a four-year graduation guarantee to all students who remain in good academic standing, declare a major course of study by the end of sophomore year, and follow an approved course plan.

=== Center for Politics and the People ===
The Center for Politics and the People was established in spring 2014. The center sponsors scholarship and hosts special events featuring elected officials and policy makers, high-level campaign operatives, academic experts, journalists, prognosticators and citizens representing a spectrum of political views. The center also manages the college's annual Career Discovery Tour to Washington, D.C., and helps place students in internships.

=== Center for Career and Professional Development ===
The Center for Career and Professional Development offers resources to students such as workshops, employer visits, job fairs, and assistance with writing a resume. It also helps organize the annual Career Discovery Tour.

=== Summer Opportunity for Advanced Research (SOAR) ===
SOAR is a program offered to students of various disciplines to research alongside professors over the summer while living on campus and partaking in volunteer projects around the local community. It was first offered in summer 2021.

=== Badger Boys State ===
From 1941 to 2019, the college served as the host site for Badger Boys State, a summer leadership and citizenship program for more than 800 Wisconsin high school juniors that focuses on exploring the mechanics of American government and politics.

=== Masters of Exercise Science ===
The only graduate program offered at the college is a master's degree in exercise science, with concentrations in exercise physiology, sport psychology, and sport management. The program was launched in 2024.

== Arts ==
The college's C.J. Rodman Center for the Arts houses the Departments of Art, Music, and Theater.

=== Visual art ===
The Art Department manages two gallery spaces, one of which is dedicated to student work and the other to art more broadly. Work by students and professional artists is also shown across campus. A sculpture garden is located adjacent to the building. Two art works of note in the permanent collection of the college are life-size portraits by Anthony van Dyck of Princess Amalia of the House of Orange and Sir Roger Townshend. The Classics department also manages a collection of classical Greek and Roman artifacts, many of which are displayed in the campus library.

=== Music ===
The college has a music department which offers classes, lessons, and ensembles. Students of any major may participate in the music department and are eligible for music scholarships. The department offers the following ensembles: Orchestra, Symphonic Wind Ensemble, Rally Band, Jazz Ensemble, and three choirs (Chamber Singers, Choral Union, and Concert Choir). All musical ensembles, with the exception of Chamber Singers, are open to students, faculty and staff, and community members to join without auditioning. All musical performances by campus groups are free to students and the public. The program also hosts visiting musicians each semester, and performances are free to all students.

=== Theater ===
The college's theater program produces three productions per year, with students from any major encouraged to act or be involved with set, costume, and makeup design. Each theater major directs a one-act production their senior year, as part of a campus theater festival. Students regularly participate in the Region III Kennedy Center American College Theatre Festival. All theatrical events are free to students and the public.

== Sustainability and the environment ==
=== Sustainability initiatives ===
Ripon College attempts to be a sustainable institution. It has a fleet of campus hybrid vehicles, a recycling program, and uses energy efficient light bulbs.

=== Ceresco Prairie Conservancy ===
The college is home to the Ceresco Prairie Conservancy, consisting of 130 acres (53 ha) of native prairie, oak savanna, and wetland habitat in the making. The Ceresco Prairie Conservancy is used by different classes in a number of different disciplines. Trails for walking and snowshoeing throughout this area connect to a municipally run older growth woods nature park, the South Woods, which consists of 55 acres (22.26 ha).

=== Environmental activism by students and faculty ===
A student group, EGOR: The Environmental Group of Ripon, focuses on awareness of environmental issues and contributes to the restoration and preservation of the prairie.

=== Environmental Studies major ===
Students can also major in environmental studies, which is an interdisciplinary program.

== Media ==
- College Days – a monthly newspaper, published both in print and digitally
- WRPN-FM – a campus radio station with digital broadcasts
- RCTV – a television production group (defunct as of Fall 2022)
- Parallax – a literary magazine
- Crimson – yearbook that was formerly distributed every spring. The last issue was published in the spring of 2017.

== Student life ==
=== Clubs ===
There are over 60 student clubs on campus, including special interest groups, diversity-based groups, political groups, Greek organizations, and academic honor societies. There is also a Student Senate, a student government that is open to all students to discuss issues and vote on different matters.

=== Greek life ===
The college has several sorority chapters and fraternities. All of the Greek chapters live in dorms. The only exception, local fraternity Phi Kappa Pi, also known as the Merrimen, had its own house from 1939 until it was razed in 2021.

=== Diversity ===
People of color compose 16.9% of the student population. The McNair Scholars program supports first generation college students and African American, Native American, and Hispanic students who wish to attend graduate school. The Center for Diversity and Inclusion (CDI), inaugurated in 2015, is a space on campus that centers diversity, including programming such as multicultural events. Student groups that focus on the experiences of racially diverse, culturally diverse, and LGBT students are also active on campus, and are part of a wider Diversity Coalition through the CDI.

== Campus facilities ==
=== Education buildings and offices ===
The Ripon College Historic District is on the National Register of Historic Places.

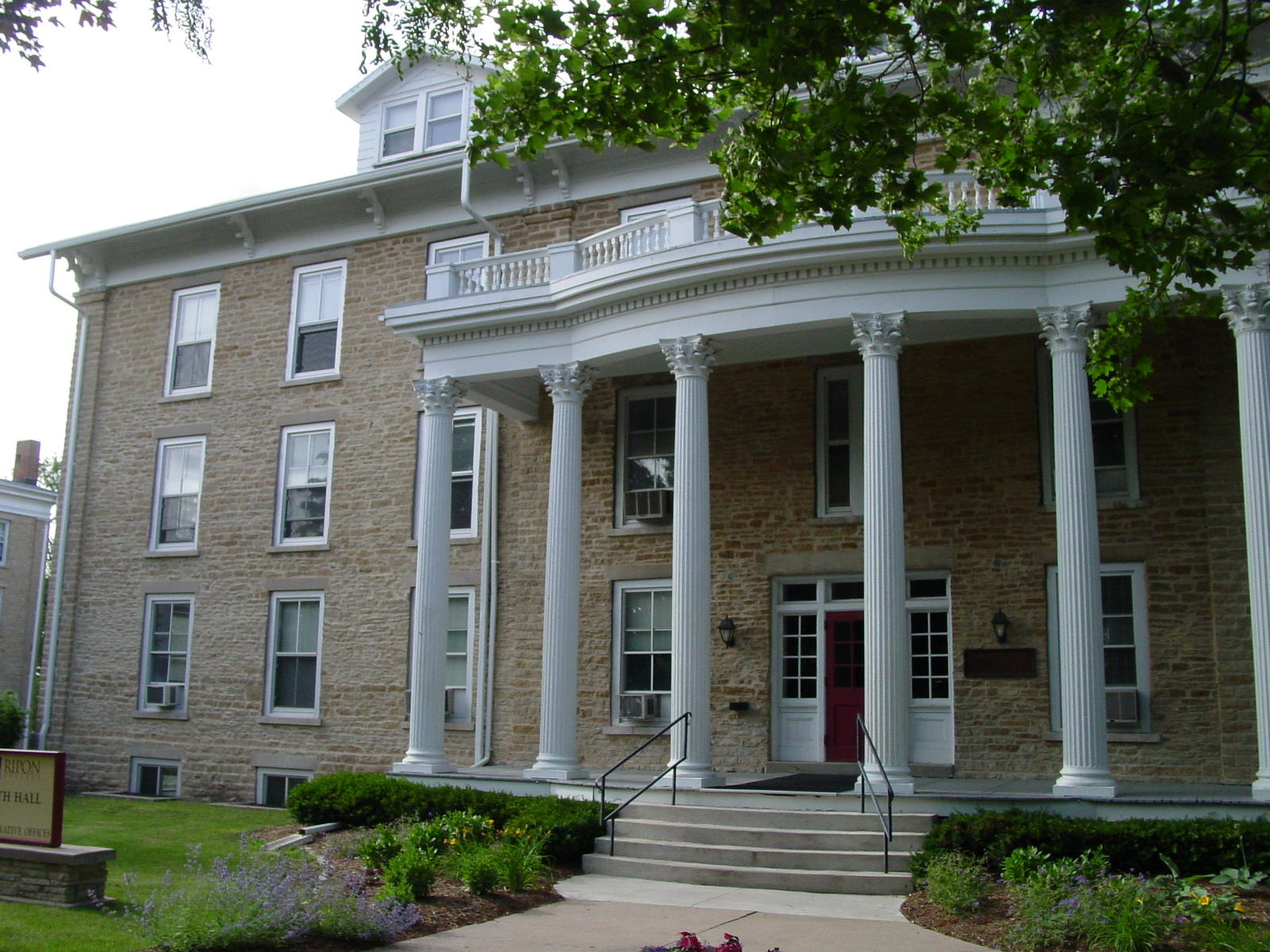
Smith Hall

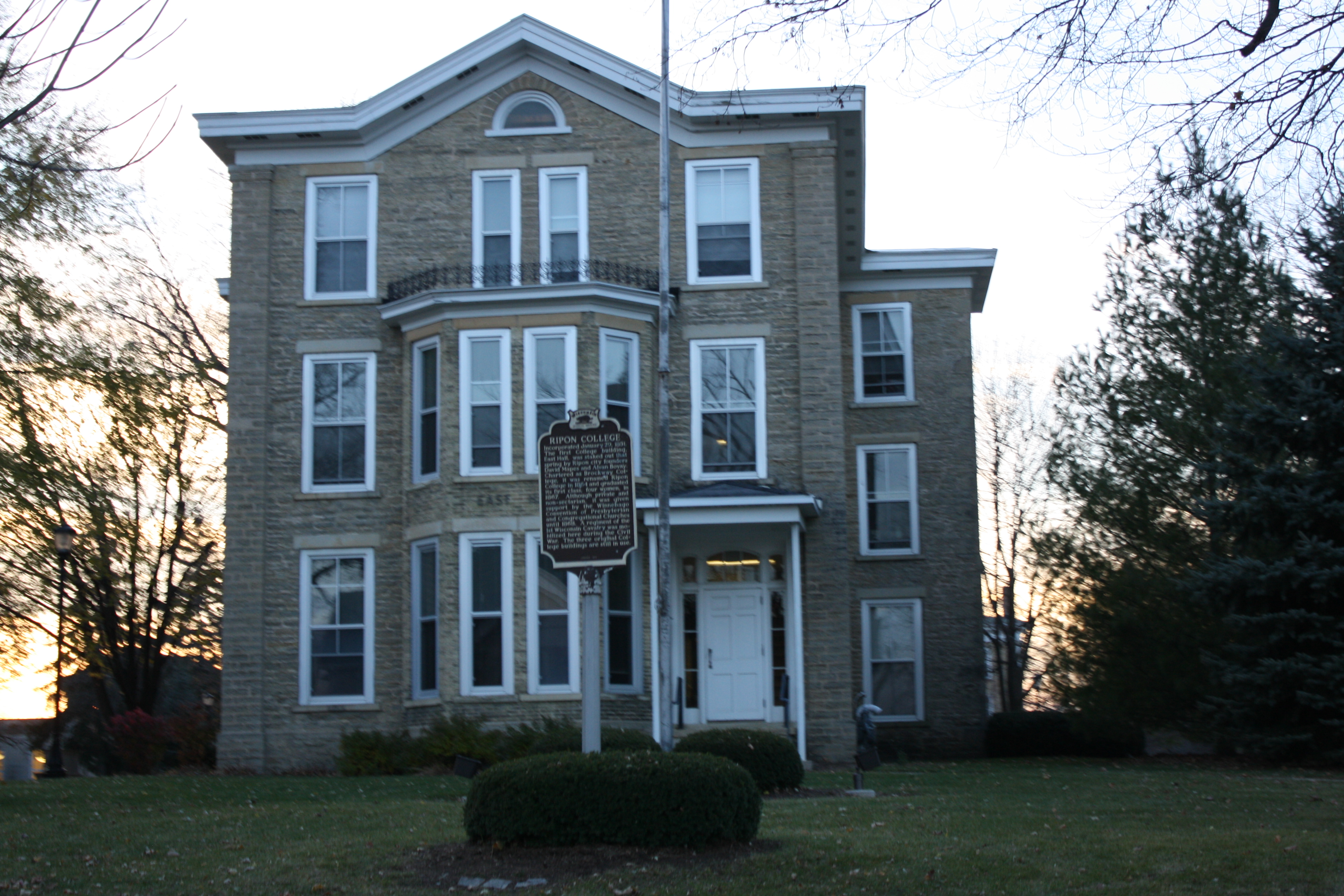
East Hall

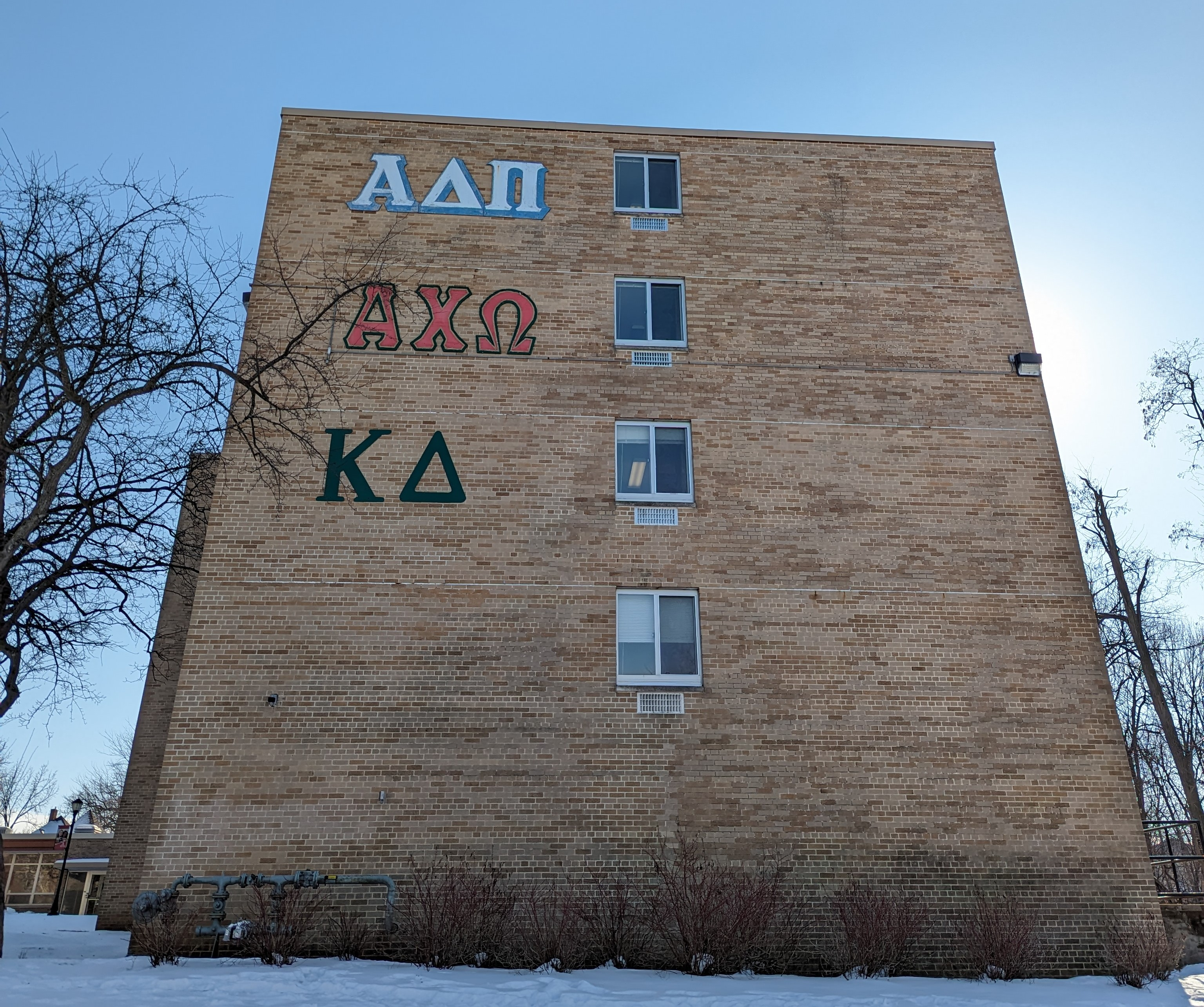
A side view of Johnson Hall

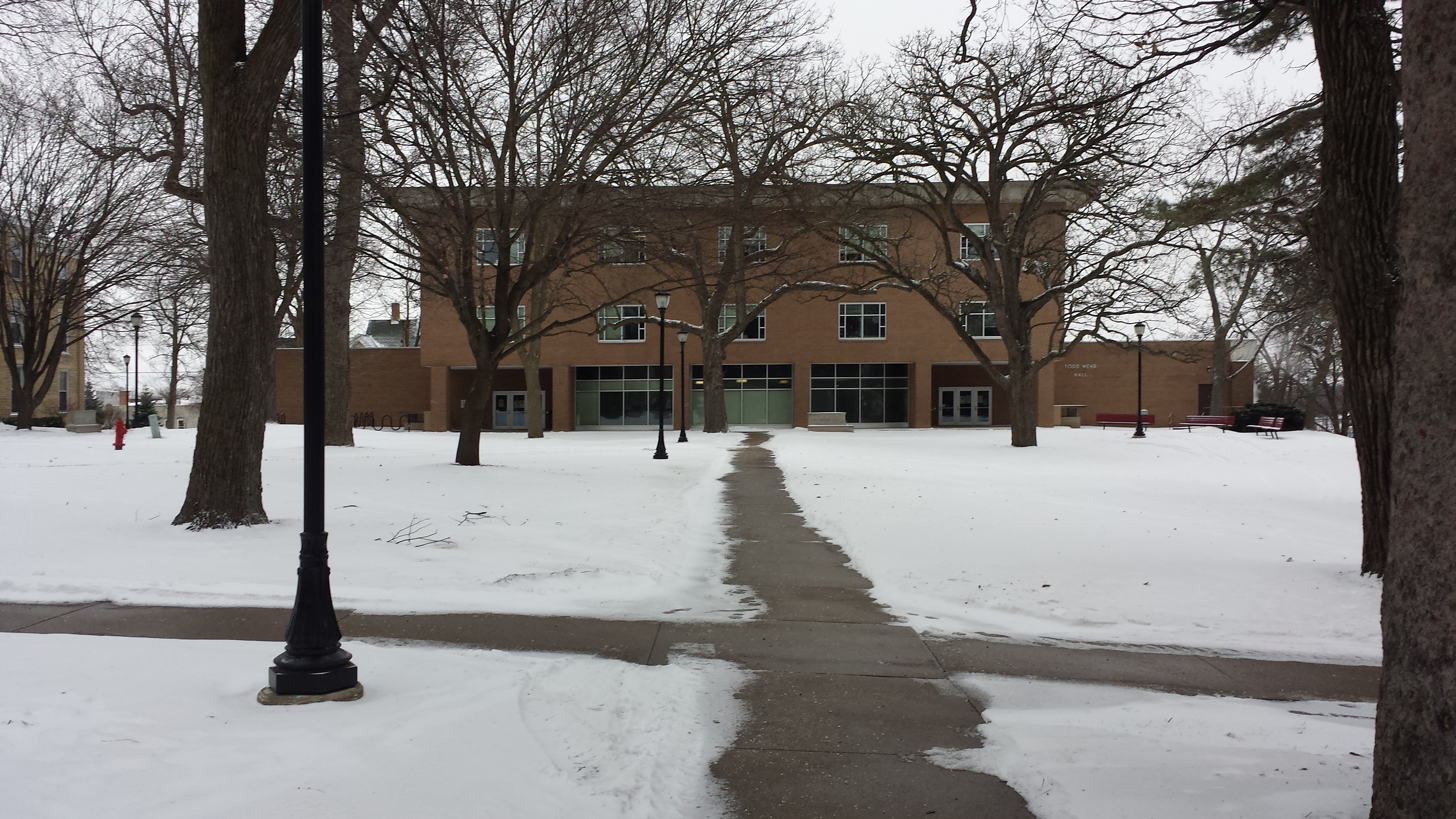
Todd Wehr Hall

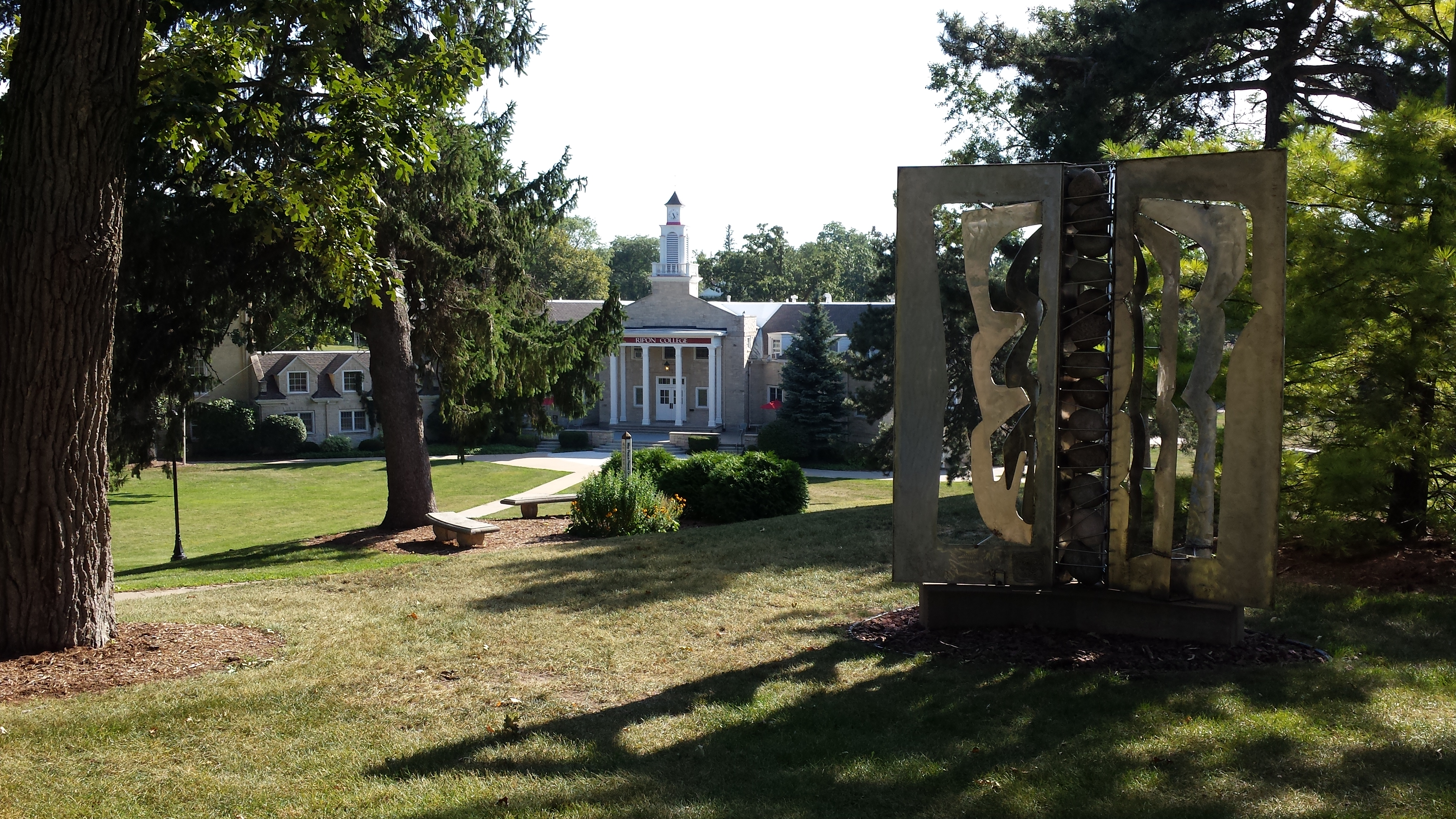
Harwood Memorial Union

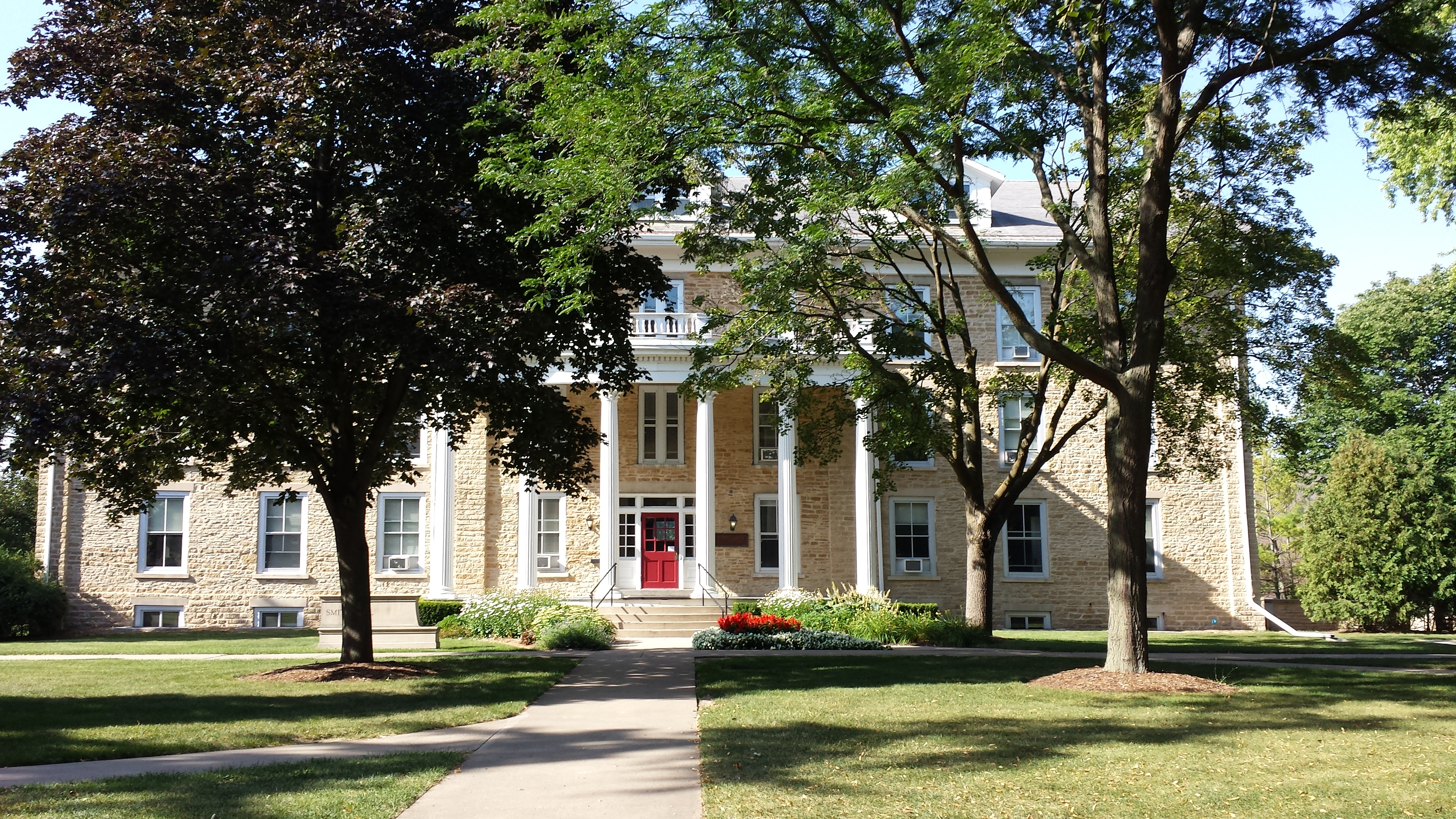
Smith Hall

== Recognition ==
For 2023, U.S. News & World Report ranked the school tied at #136 in National Liberal Arts Colleges and tied at #38 in Top Performers on Social Mobility. In 2017, it was named #3 on a list of "Best Bang for the Buck Midwest Colleges" by Washington Monthly. In 2024, The Princeton Review listed it as one of the "Best Midwestern Colleges" and as one of "The Best 389 Colleges", along with being ranked #19 on a list of colleges with "Lots of Greek Life".

== Athletics ==
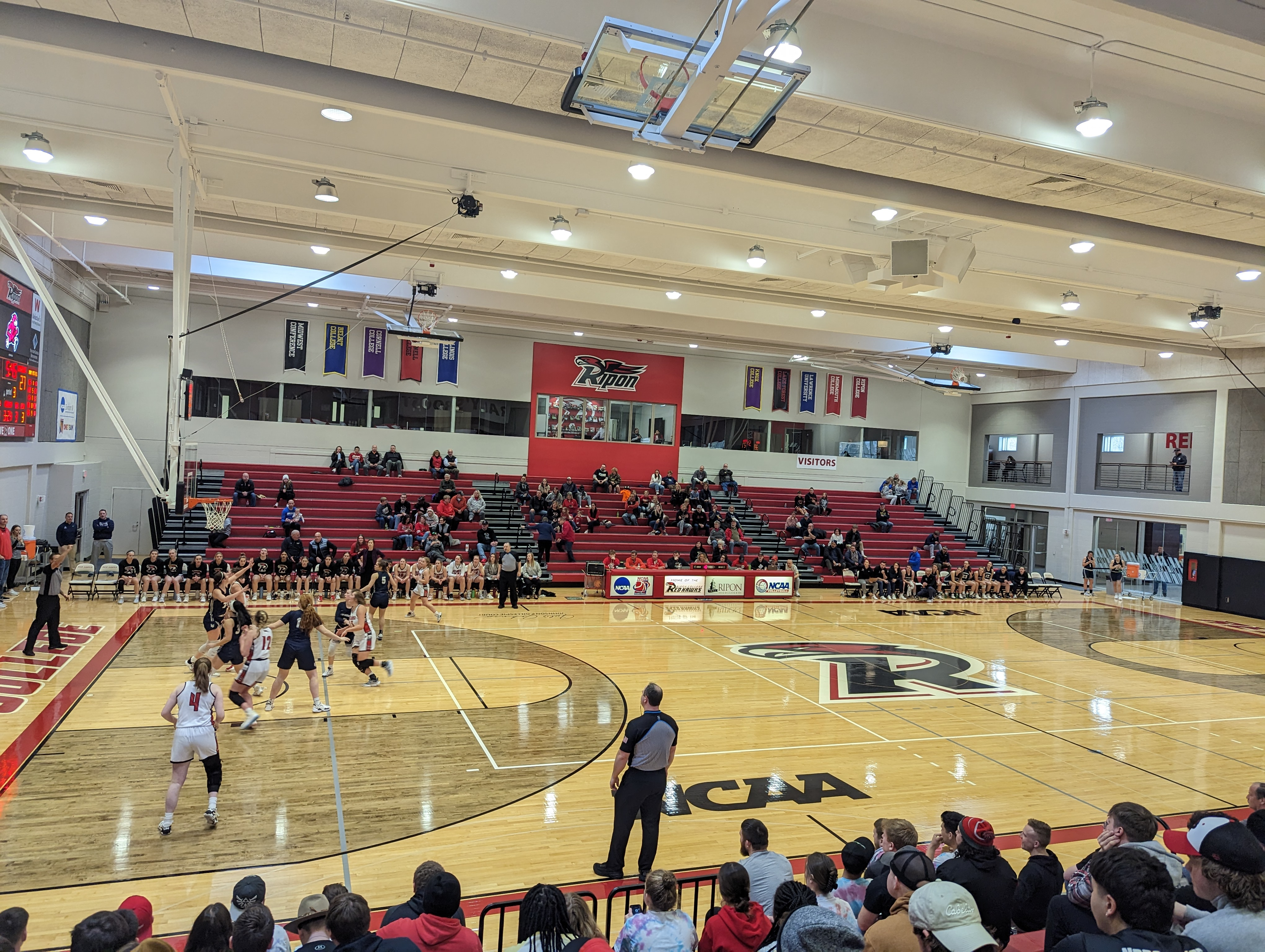
A women's basketball game at Ripon College in the Weiske Gymnasium in the Wilmore Center

Ripon athletics teams participate in NCAA Division III as part of the Midwest Conference. Conference competition for men includes: cross-country, football, soccer (fall), basketball (winter), swimming (winter), indoor and outdoor track, baseball, and tennis (spring). Conference competition for women includes: cross-country, soccer, tennis, volleyball (fall), basketball (winter), Esports (Fall & Spring) swimming (winter), indoor and outdoor track, and softball (spring).

=== Facilities ===
The College's athletic facility, the Willmore Center, opened in August 2017. It is a total of 165,000 sq ft. (15329 sq m.). It is open to both community members and members of the College.

Hopp Stadium, the on-campus sports stadium, was opened in fall 2023. The previous sports stadium, Ingalls Field, was not located on campus, and was shared by both Ripon High School and Ripon College.

== Notable faculty ==
- Edward Daniels, geologist
- David Graham, poet
- Karen Holbrook, President of Ohio State University
- Bruno E. Jacob, founder of the National Forensic League
- Wacław Jędrzejewicz, Polish diplomat
- Alfred E. Kahn, Chairman of the Civil Aeronautics Board
- Peg Lautenschlager, Attorney General of Wisconsin
- Minerva Brace Norton, educator and author
- Russell Burton Reynolds, U.S. Army Major General
- Clarissa Tucker Tracy, botanist
- William Hayes Ward, President of the American Oriental Society

=== Presidents ===
- William E. Merriman (1863–1876)
- Edward Huntington Merrell (1876–1891)
- Rufus Cushman Flagg (1892–1901)
- Richard Cecil Hughes (1901–1909)
- Silas Evans (1910–1917, 1921–1942)
- Henry Coe Culbertson (1918–1920)
- Clark G. Kuebler (1943–1954)
- Frederick Oliver Pinkham (1955–1965)
- Bernard S. Adams (1966–1985)
- William R. Stott Jr (1985–1995)
- Paul Byers Ranslow (1996–2002)
- David C. Joyce (2003–2011)
- Zach P. Messitte (2012–2022)
- Victoria N. Folse (2022–present)
