= Ripon, Wisconsin =

- City
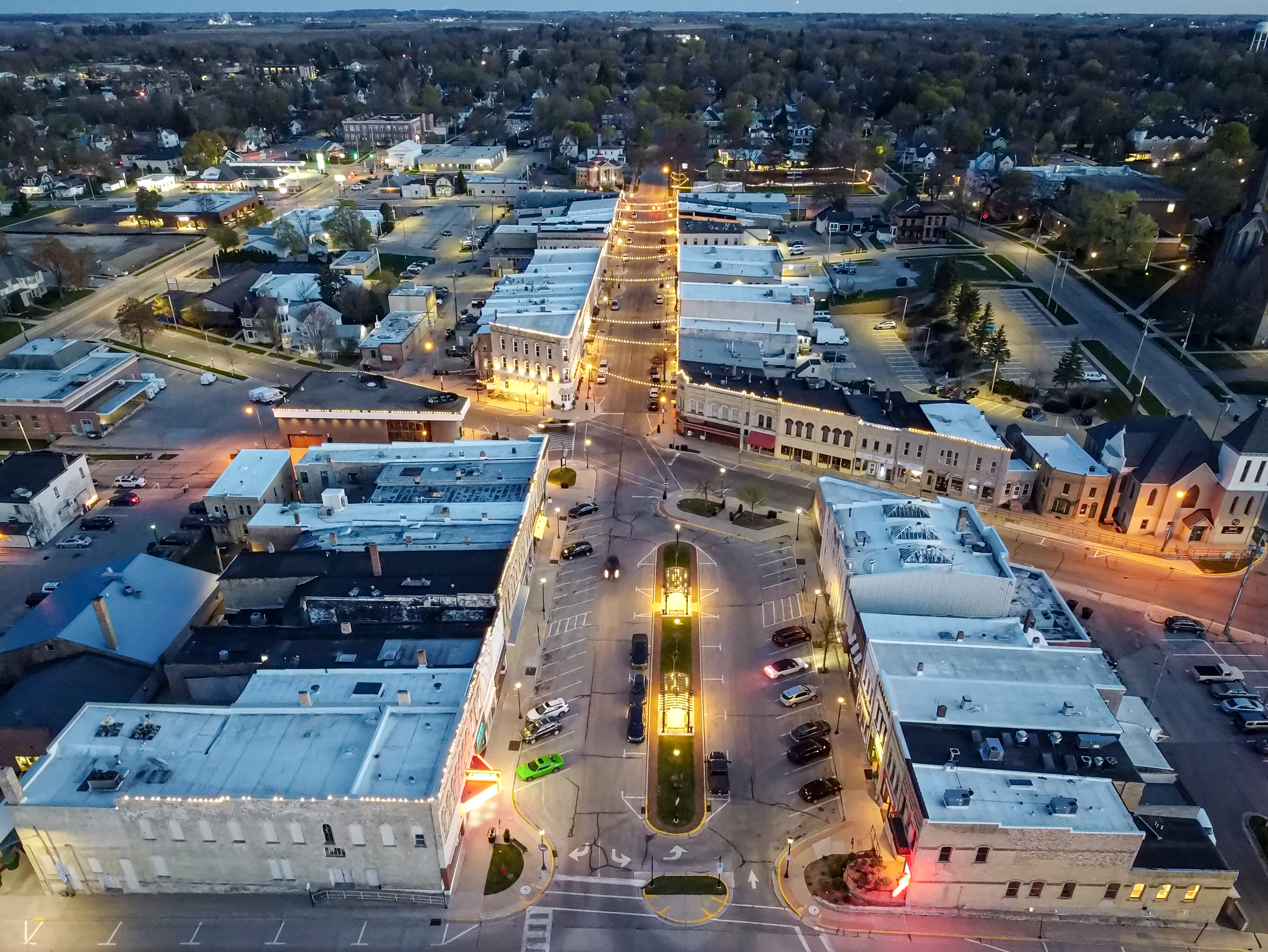
- Downtown Ripon

- Location of Ripon in Fond du Lac County, Wisconsin

- Location within the state of Wisconsin Location within the United States
- Coordinates: 43°50′39″N 88°50′20″W
- Country: United States
- State: Wisconsin
- County: Fond du Lac
- settled: 1849

Area
  - Total: 5.03 sq mi (13.02 km^{2})
  - Land: 4.97 sq mi (12.88 km^{2})
  - Water: 0.054 sq mi (0.14 km^{2})

Population (2020)
  - Total: 7,863
  - Density: 1,581/sq mi (610.5/km^{2})
- Time zone: UTC-6 (Central (CST))
  - Summer (DST): UTC-5 (CDT)
- Area code: 920
- FIPS code: 55-68175
- Website: cityofripon.com

Ripon (/ˈrɪpən/ RIH-pən) is a city in Fond du Lac County, Wisconsin, United States. The population was 7,863 at the 2020 census. The city is surrounded by the Town of Ripon.

Ripon is home to the Little White Schoolhouse, where the Republican Party was founded.

== History ==
=== Founding ===
Ripon was founded in 1849 by David P. Mapes, a former New York steamboat captain. Within two years the city had absorbed the nearby commune of Ceresco, established in 1844 by the Wisconsin Phalanx, a group of settlers inspired by the communitarian socialist philosophy of Charles Fourier. Mapes was a founder of Ripon College, originally incorporated as Brockway College in 1851.

The city was named for the English cathedral city of Ripon, North Yorkshire, by John S. Horner, one of the community's original settlers, because that was where his immigrant ancestors originated. Horner also named most of the streets. His house is still standing today.

=== Birthplace of the Republican Party ===
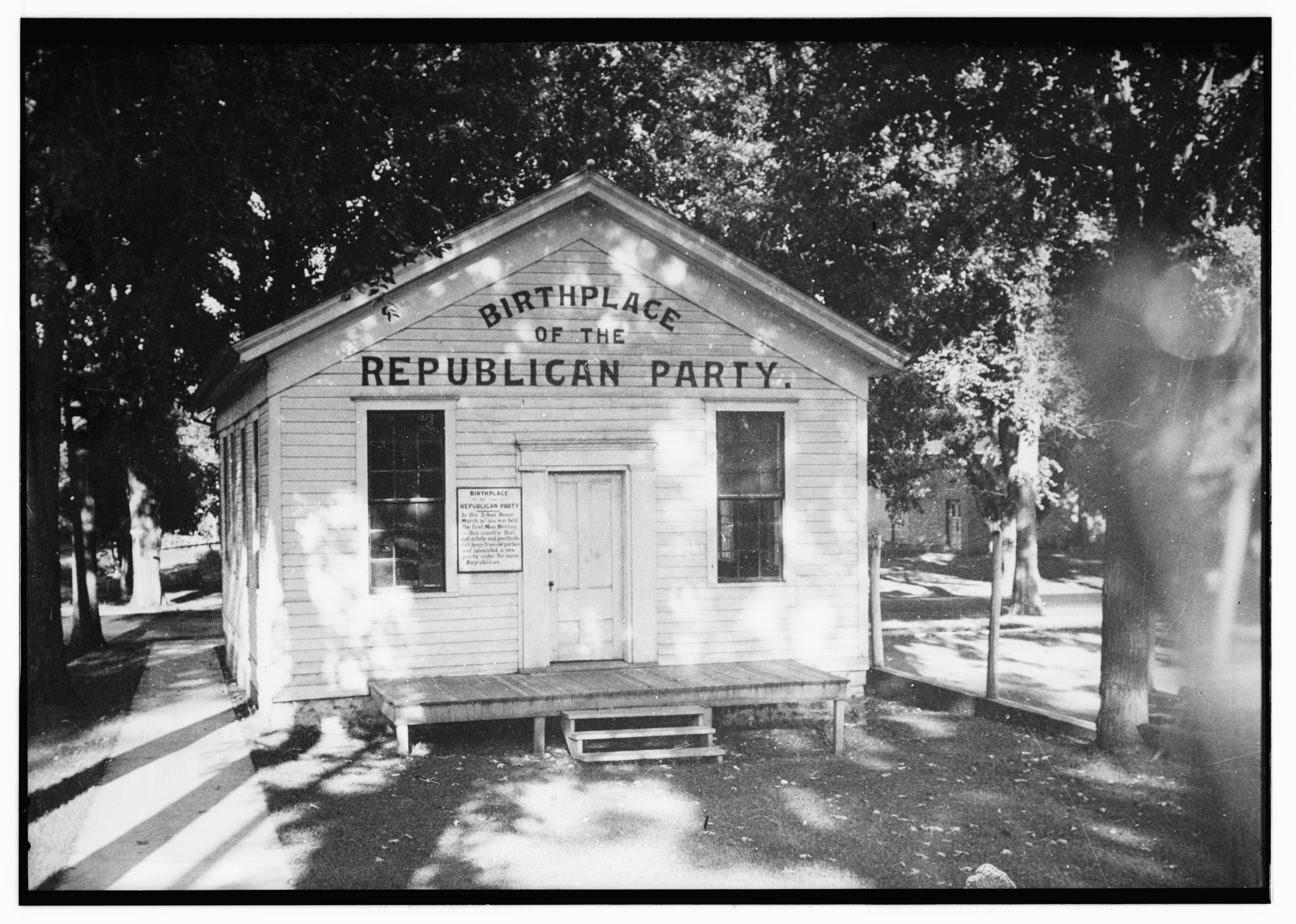
The Little White Schoolhouse of Ripon, original building standing in 1936. Listed on the Wisconsin Registered Historic Places.

Meeting at a school house in Ripon on March 20, 1854, some 30 opponents of the Kansas–Nebraska Act called for the organization of a new political party (to link their cause with the Declaration of Independence). The group also took a leading role in the creation of the Republican Party in many northern states during the summer of 1854. While conservatives and many moderates were content merely to call for the restoration of the Missouri Compromise or a prohibition of slavery extension, the group insisted that no further political compromise with slavery was possible.

The February 1854 meeting was the first political meeting of the group that would become the Republican Party. The modern Ripon Society, a Republican think tank, takes its name from Ripon, Wisconsin.

Crawfordsville, Iowa and Jackson, Michigan also claim to be the true birthplace of the Republican Party.

== Geography ==
Ripon is located in the northwestern corner of Fond du Lac County. According to the United States Census Bureau, the city has a total area of 5.02 square miles (13.00 km^{2}), of which 4.97 square miles (12.87 km^{2}) is land and 0.05 square miles (0.13 km^{2}) is water.

Ripon lies in the Sinnipee Group, a geologic formation composed primarily of dolomite, with limestone as a secondary rock type. Ripon's bedrock is primarily limestone. The limestone indicates that Ripon's location was once a shallow sea. Since Ripon is on the Sinnipee Group, it is a Karst environment. Ripon also lies in an area that was affected by several glaciation periods. The area has relatively gentle relief and is part of the Fox River (Wisconsin) watershed.

== Demographics ==
Historical population
Census	Pop.	Note	%±
1860	2,025		—
1870	2,976		47.0%
1880	3,117		4.7%
1890	3,358		7.7%
1900	3,818		13.7%
1910	3,739		−2.1%
1920	3,929		5.1%
1930	3,984		1.4%
1940	4,566		14.6%
1950	5,619		23.1%
1960	6,163		9.7%
1970	7,053		14.4%
1980	7,111		0.8%
1990	7,241		1.8%
2000	6,828		−5.7%
2010	7,733		13.3%
2020	7,863		1.7%
U.S. Decennial Census

=== 2010 census ===
As of the census of 2010, there were 7,733 people, 3,053 households, and 1,769 families living in the city. The population density was 1,555.9 inhabitants per square mile (600.7/km^{2}). There were 3,306 housing units at an average density of 665.2 per square mile (256.8/km^{2}). The racial makeup of the city was 94.7% White, 0.7% African American, 0.3% Native American, 0.8% Asian, 2.6% from other races, and 0.9% from two or more races. Hispanic or Latino people of any race were 5.0% of the population.

There were 3,053 households, of which 27.8% had children under the age of 18 living with them, 45.3% were married couples living together, 8.7% had a female householder with no husband present, 3.9% had a male householder with no wife present, and 42.1% were non-families. 36.5% of all households were made up of individuals, and 17.7% had someone living alone who was 65 years of age or older. The average household size was 2.22 and the average family size was 2.90.

The median age in the city was 37.2 years. 20.2% of residents were under the age of 18; 17.5% were between the ages of 18 and 24; 21.8% were from 25 to 44; 23.6% were from 45 to 64; and 17% were 65 years of age or older. The gender makeup of the city was 47.4% male and 52.6% female.

=== 2000 census ===
As of the census of 2000, there were 6,828 people, 2,922 households, and 1,759 families living in the city. The population density was 1,612.8 people per square mile (623.2/km^{2}). There were 3,118 housing units at an average density of 736.5 per square mile (284.6/km^{2}). The racial makeup of the city was 97.72% White, 0.19% Black or African American, 0.16% Native American, 0.50% Asian, 0.86% from other races, and 0.57% from two or more races. 2.21% of the population were Hispanic or Latino of any race.

There were 2,922 households, out of which 28.6% had children under the age of 18 living with them, 48.8% were married couples living together, 8.7% had a female householder with no husband present, and 39.8% were non-families. 34.0% of all households were made up of individuals, and 17.0% had someone living alone who was 65 years of age or older. The average household size was 2.26 and the average family size was 2.93.

In the city, the population was spread out, with 23.3% under the age of 18, 7.7% from 18 to 24, 27.7% from 25 to 44, 22.2% from 45 to 64, and 19.1% who were 65 years of age or older. The median age was 40 years. For every 100 females, there were 87.0 males. For every 100 females age 18 and over, there were 84.3 males.

The median income for a household in the city was $37,399, and the median income for a family was $51,100. Males had a median income of $35,990 versus $25,053 for females. The per capita income for the city was $20,313. About 4.4% of families and 6.4% of the population were below the poverty line, including 7.0% of those under age 18 and 5.2% of those age 65 or over.

== Economy ==
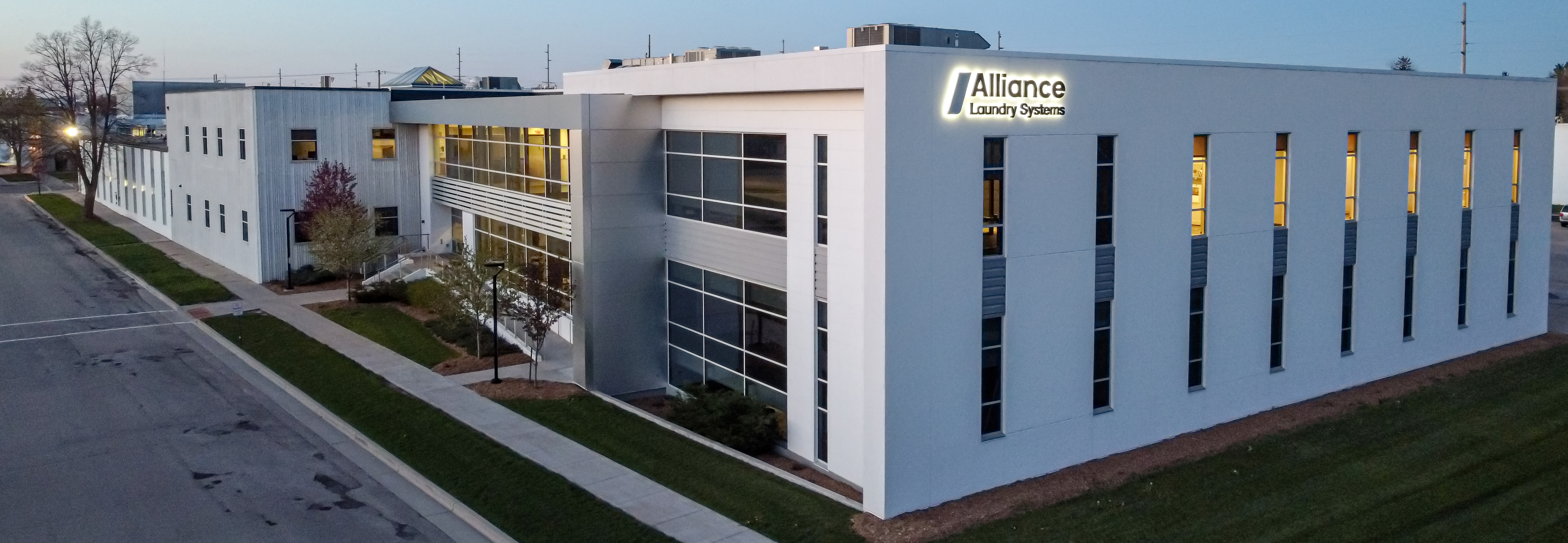
Alliance Laundry Systems

- Alliance Laundry Systems (Speed Queen commercial line)
- National Forensic League

== Education ==
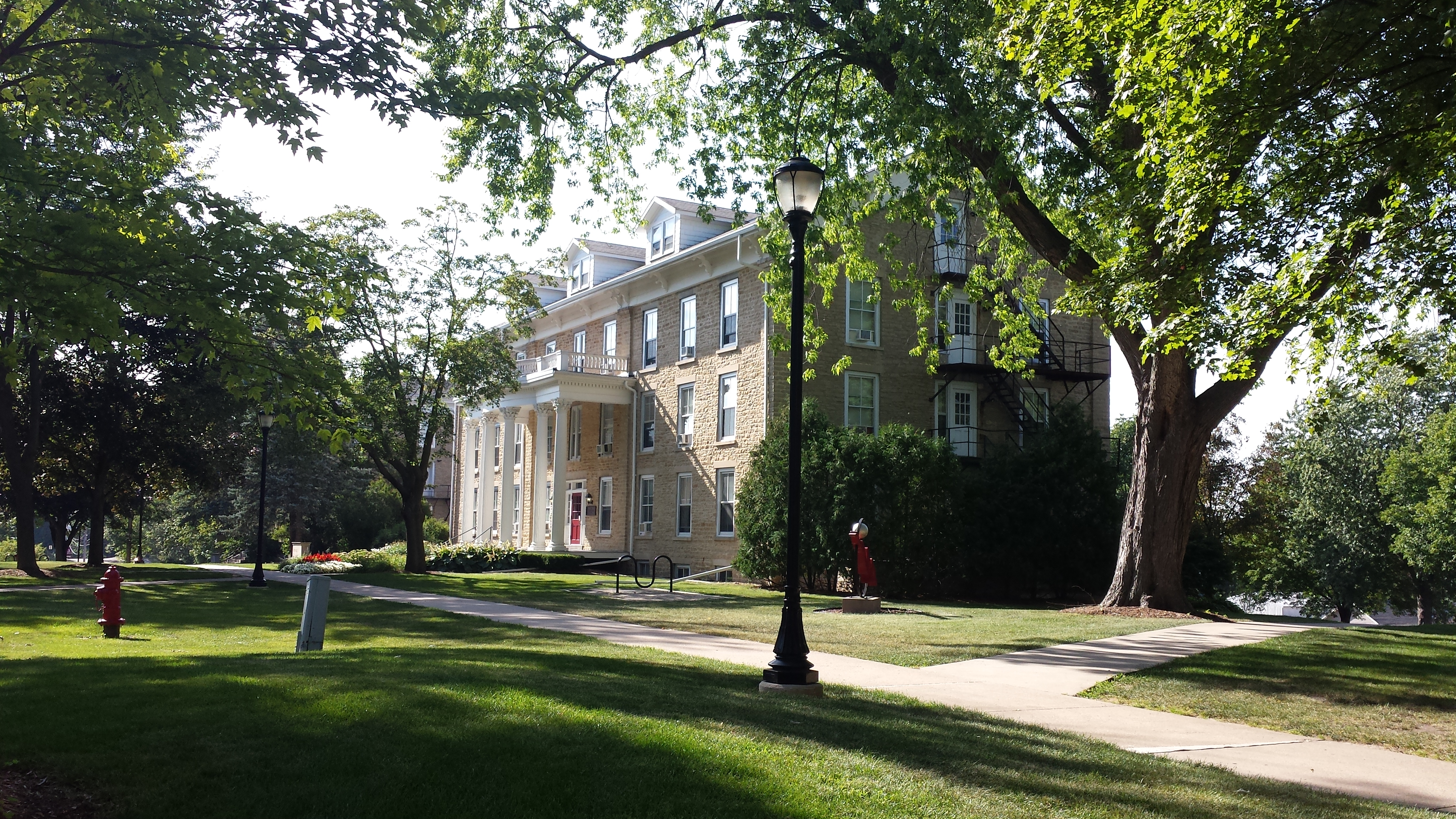
Ripon College

- Ripon College is a liberal arts college in Ripon.
- Ripon High School

== Transportation ==
Ripon is served by Wisconsin 23, Wisconsin 44 and Wisconsin 49 of the state highway system. Wis 23 West and Wis 49 North head to Green Lake. Wis 23 heads east to Rosendale and Fond du Lac. Wis 44 North heads northeast to Pickett and Oshkosh. Wis 44 and 49 South are cosigned, exiting town for six miles. Wis 44 heads to Fairwater. Wis 49 heads to Brandon and Waupun. Fond du Lac County Hwy E also serves the town.

Ripon is the starting point for the Fisk VFR arrival into EAA AirVenture Oshkosh.

== Notable people ==
- Frank L. Anders, Medal of Honor recipient, attended college and died in Ripon
- Ezekiel Babcock, farmer and politician
- Jeanne Bice, entrepreneur, television personality and founder of the Quacker Factory clothing line
- Sarah Powers Bradish, writer and WCTU activist
- Carrie Chapman Catt, president of the National American Woman Suffrage Association
- Arthur F. Hinz, politician
- John S. Horner, acting Governor of Michigan Territory and Secretary of Wisconsin Territory
- Bruno E. Jacob, founder of the National Forensic League; though born in the nearby town of Valders, lived in Ripon most of his life
- Lewis G. Kellogg, politician
- Asa Kinney, pioneer and politician
- Oscar Hugh La Grange, Union Army general
- Alonzo A. Loper, politician
- Richard Maltby, Jr., theater director and producer, lyricist, screenwriter, cryptic crossword constructor for Harper's Magazine
- Gard Miller, Wisconsin State Representative
- George Mitchell, politician
- Roy E. Reed, politician and lawyer
- H. Gordon Selfridge, founder of London-based Selfridges department store, born in Ripon
- Fred E. Soper, Wisconsin State Representative
- William Starr, Wisconsin State Representative
- Lyman Wellington Thayer, politician
- Clarissa Tracy, botanist, taught at Ripon College, studied the local flora for 30 years and died in Ripon
- William D. Turner, politician
- Otto Julius Zobel, inventor of the m-derived filter and the Zobel network, born and raised in Ripon

== See also ==
- Ceresco, Wisconsin
- National Register of Historic Places listings in Fond du Lac County, Wisconsin
- List of National Historic Landmarks in Wisconsin
- Ripon, California — named after Ripon, Wisconsin

== Images ==
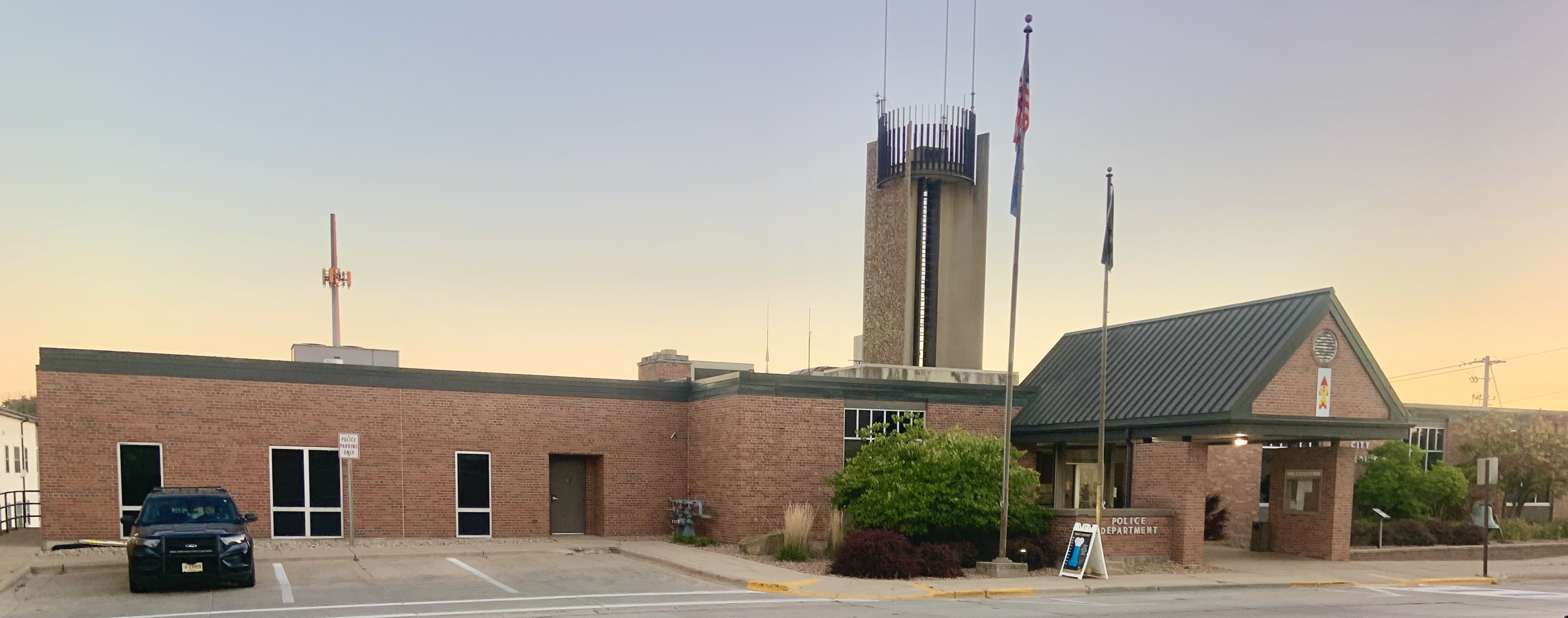
Ripon City Hall and police department

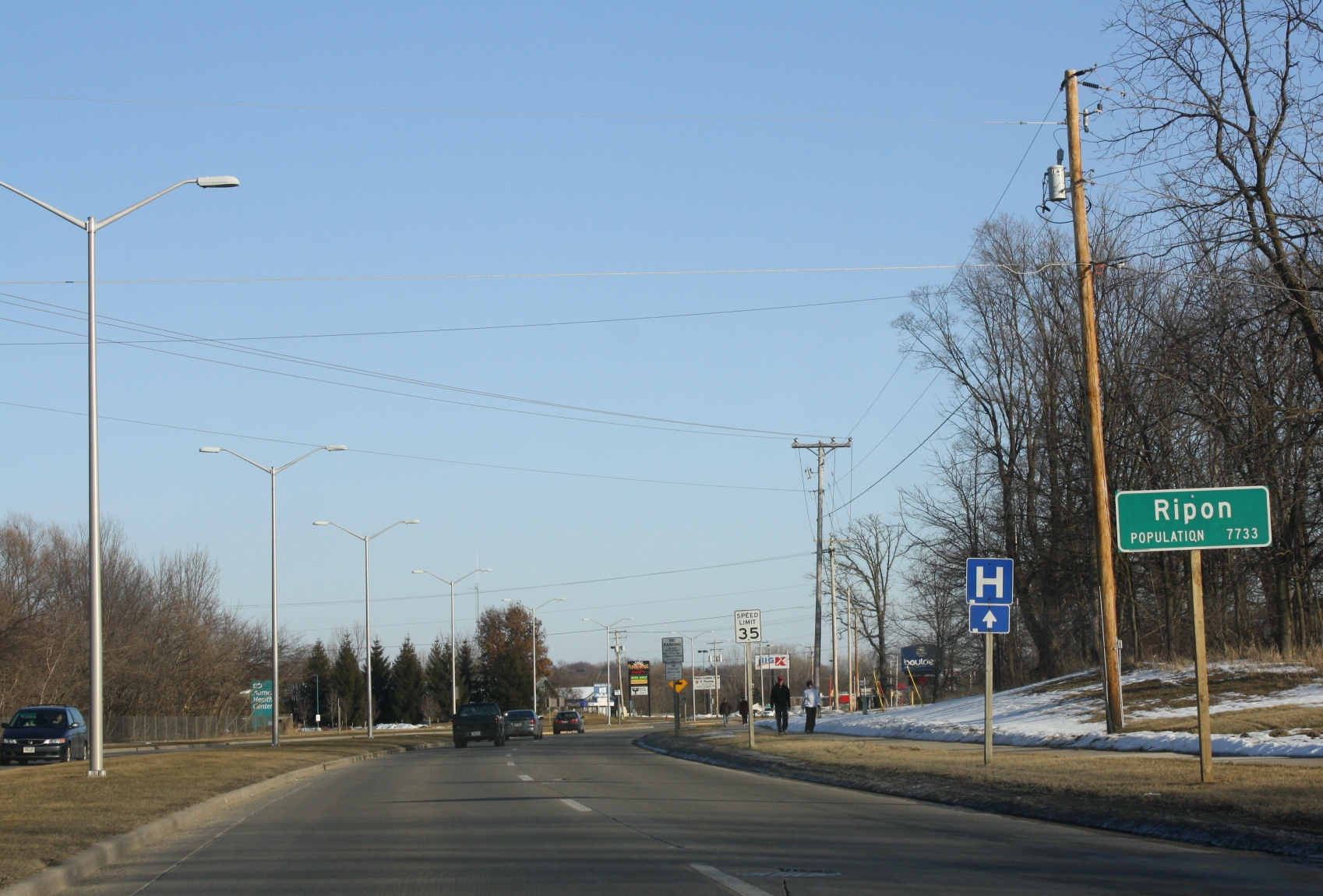
Ripon sign looking east on WIS 23

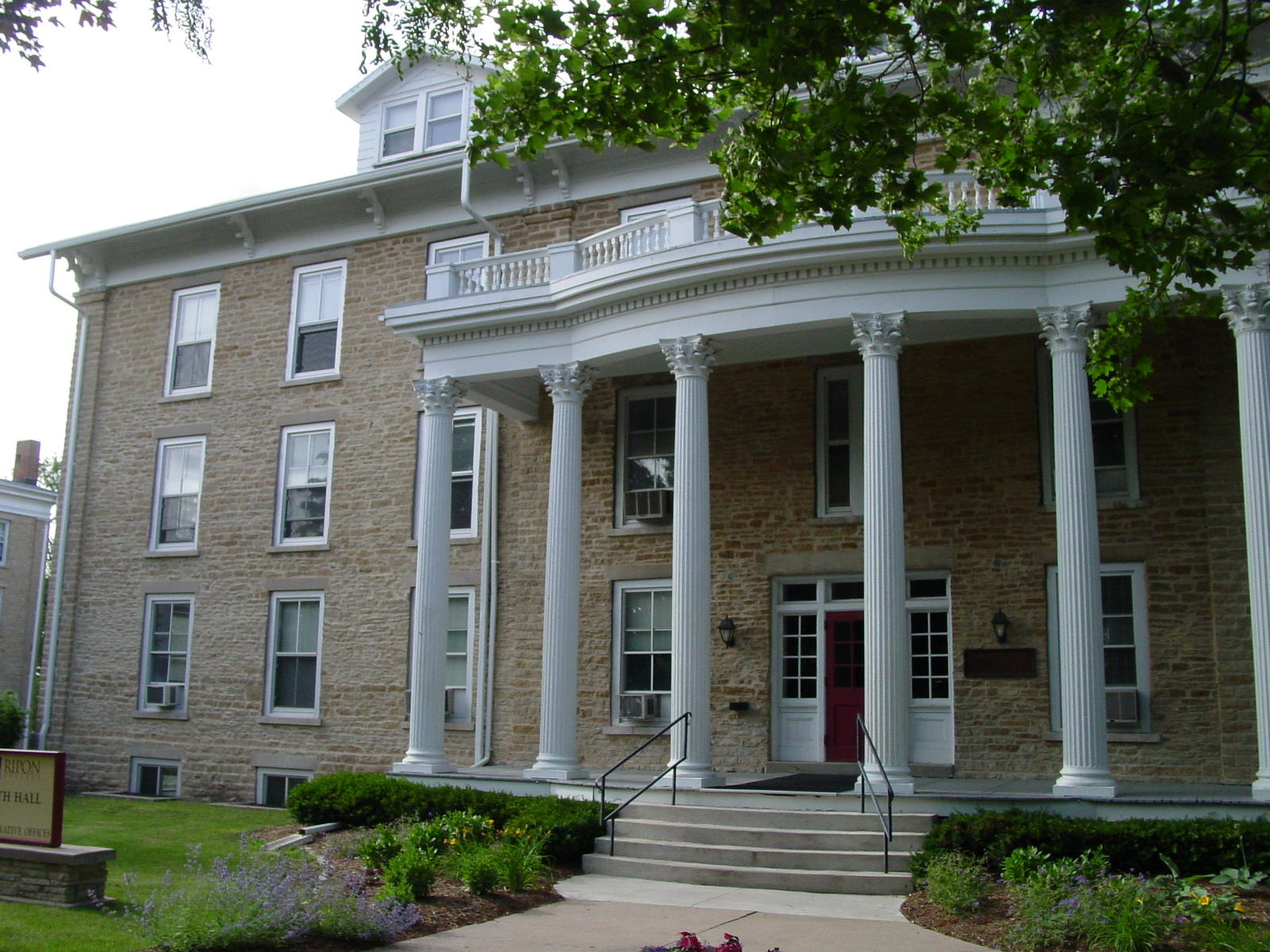
Ripon College

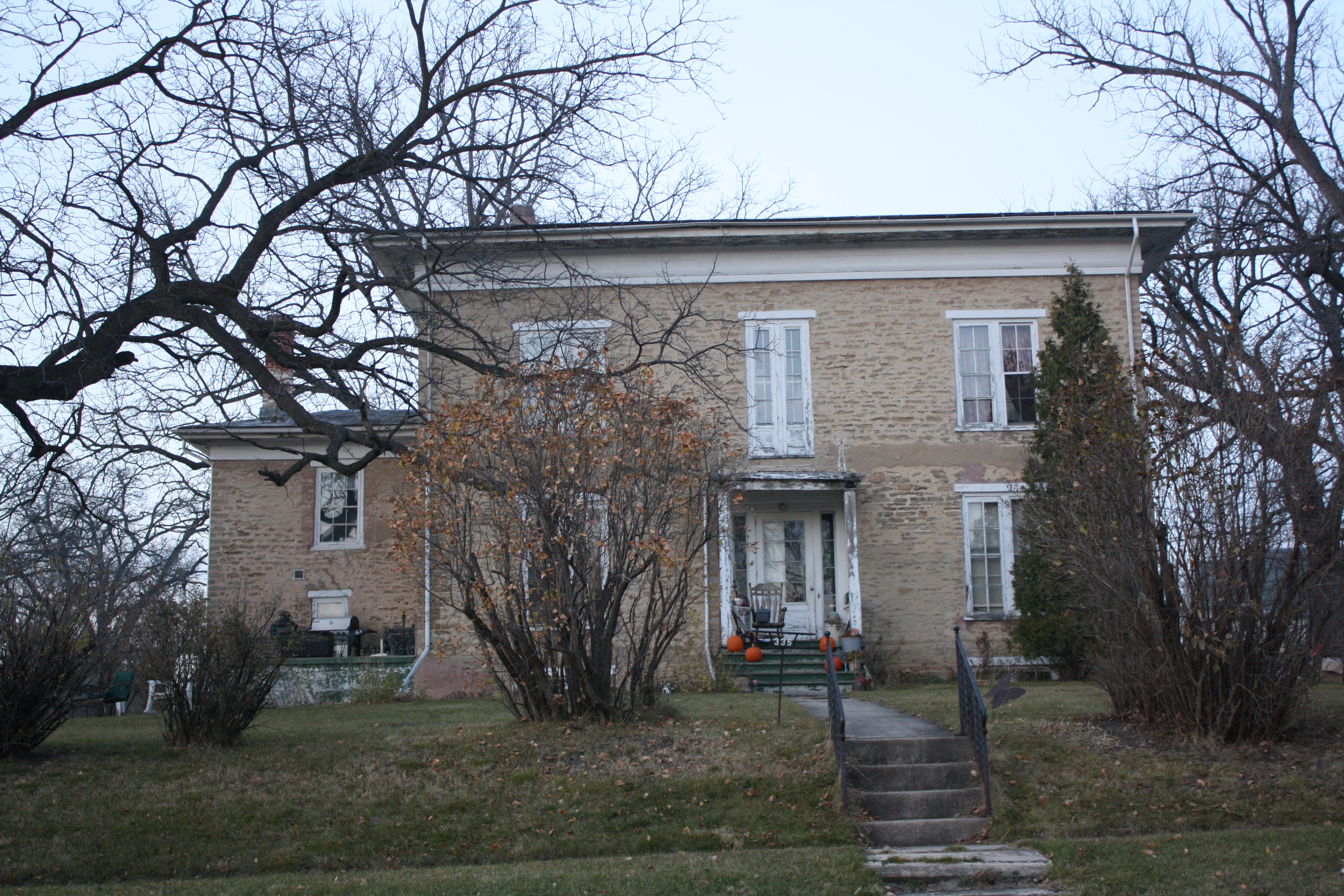
John Scott Horner House
