= Wisconsin's St. Croix County Assembly district =

Former American legislative district

Wisconsin's St. Croix County State Assembly district
- Obsolete
- Notes: 1868–1970

The St. Croix County district of Wisconsin was a district in the Wisconsin State Assembly. Located in Western Wisconsin, the district consisted only of St. Croix County. It included the cities of Glenwood, Hudson, New Richmond, and part of River Falls. The district was first created via the 1866 redistricting plan, which split the Pierce–St. Croix district into two separate districts, and was first represented by Nat'l Union representative H. L. Wadsworth from 1867 to 1868. The district was last represented by Democrat Leo Mohn from 1971 to 1973, when the district was dissolved and replaced with the numbered district system by the 1972 redistricting act.

== List of representatives ==
List of representatives to the Wisconsin State Assembly from the St.Croix County district
Member	Party	Residence	Term start	Term end	Leg.
District created
H. L. Wadsworth	Union	River Falls	January 7, 1867	January 6, 1868	20th
Marcus Fulton	Rep.	Hudson	January 6, 1868	January 4, 1869	21st
Charles D. Parker	Rep.	Pleasant Valley	January 4, 1869	January 2, 1871	22nd 23rd
Revel K. Fay	Rep.	Star Prairie	January 2, 1871	January 1, 1872	24th
John C. Spooner	Rep.	Hudson	January 1, 1872	January 6, 1873	25th
David C. Fulton	Lib. R.	Hudson	January 6, 1873	January 5, 1874	26th
Harvey Clapp	Rep.	New Richmond	January 5, 1874	January 4, 1875	27th
Philo Boyden	Lib. R.	Hudson	January 4, 1875	January 3, 1876	28th 29th
Philo Boyden	Ref.	Hudson	January 3, 1876	January 1, 1877	28th 29th
Guy Dailey	Ref.	Hudson	January 1, 1877	January 7, 1878	30th
James Hill	Rep.	Warren	January 7, 1878	January 3, 1881	31st 32nd 33rd
Merton Herrick	Rep.	Hudson	January 3, 1881	January 2, 1882	34th
Oluf A. Saugestad	Rep.	Baldwin	January 2, 1882	January 1, 1883	35th
James Johnston	Rep.	Boardman	January 1, 1883	January 5, 1885	36th
Thomas Porter	Rep.	New Richmond	January 5, 1885	January 3, 1887	37th
Herman L. Humphrey	Rep.	Hudson	January 3, 1887	January 7, 1889	38th
Edward Conner	Rep.	Woodville	January 7, 1889	January 5, 1891	39th
George W. Chinnock	Rep.	River Falls	January 5, 1891	January 2, 1893	40th
Orrin J. Williams	Rep.	New Richmond	January 2, 1893	January 4, 1897	41st 42nd
Hans Borchsenius	Rep.	Baldwin	January 4, 1897	January 2, 1899	43rd
Orville W. Mosher	Rep.	New Richmond	January 2, 1899	January 7, 1901	44th
Henry Anderson	Rep.	Baldwin	January 7, 1901	January 5, 1903	45th
James A. Frear	Rep.	Hudson	January 5, 1903	January 2, 1905	46th
Julius Beer	Rep.	St. Joseph	January 2, 1905	January 7, 1907	47th
Peter C. Anderson	Dem.	Hammond	January 7, 1907	January 4, 1909	48th
John A. Chinnock	Rep.	Troy	January 4, 1909	January 2, 1911	49th
Andrew P. Kealy	Dem.	Hammond	January 2, 1911	January 6, 1913	50th
John A. Chinnock	Rep.	Hudson	January 6, 1913	January 6, 1919	51st 52nd 53rd
George Oakes	Rep.	New Richmond	January 6, 1919	January 1, 1923	54th 55th
Ethan B. Minier	Rep.	New Richmond	January 1, 1923	January 3, 1927	56th 57th
Robert M. Graham	Rep.	Roberts	January 3, 1927	January 7, 1929	58th
Lynn H. Ashley	Rep.	Hudson	January 7, 1929	January 5, 1931	59th
Hans A. Aune	Rep.	Baldwin	January 5, 1931	February 26, 1931	60th
--Vacant--			February 26, 1931	January 2, 1933	60th
Arthur D. Kelly	Rep.	Hudson	January 2, 1933	January 7, 1935	61st
Arthur D. Kelly	Prog.	Hudson	January 7, 1935	January 2, 1939	62nd 63rd
Arthur D. Kelly	Prog.	Hudson	January 2, 1939	September 25, 1939	64th
--Vacant--			September 25, 1939	January 6, 1941	64th
Elmer L. Rundell	Rep.	Roberts	January 6, 1941	January 3, 1949	65th 66th 67th 68th
William A. Bergeron	Rep.	Somerset	January 3, 1949	January 7, 1957	69th 70th 71st 72nd
William W. Ward	Dem.	New Richmond	January 7, 1957	January 4, 1965	73rd 74th 75th 76th
Donald L. Iverson	Dem.	Hudson	January 4, 1965	January 2, 1967	77th
Robert M. Boche	Rep.	Star Prairie	January 2, 1967	January 4, 1971	78th 79th
Leo Mohn	Dem.	Woodville	January 4, 1971	January 1, 1973	80th
District abolished by 1971 Wisconsin Act 304; The St. Croix County district was roughly replaced by the 29th Assembly district
