= 22nd Wisconsin Legislature =

Wisconsin legislative term for 1869

| ← | 21st | 23rd | → |
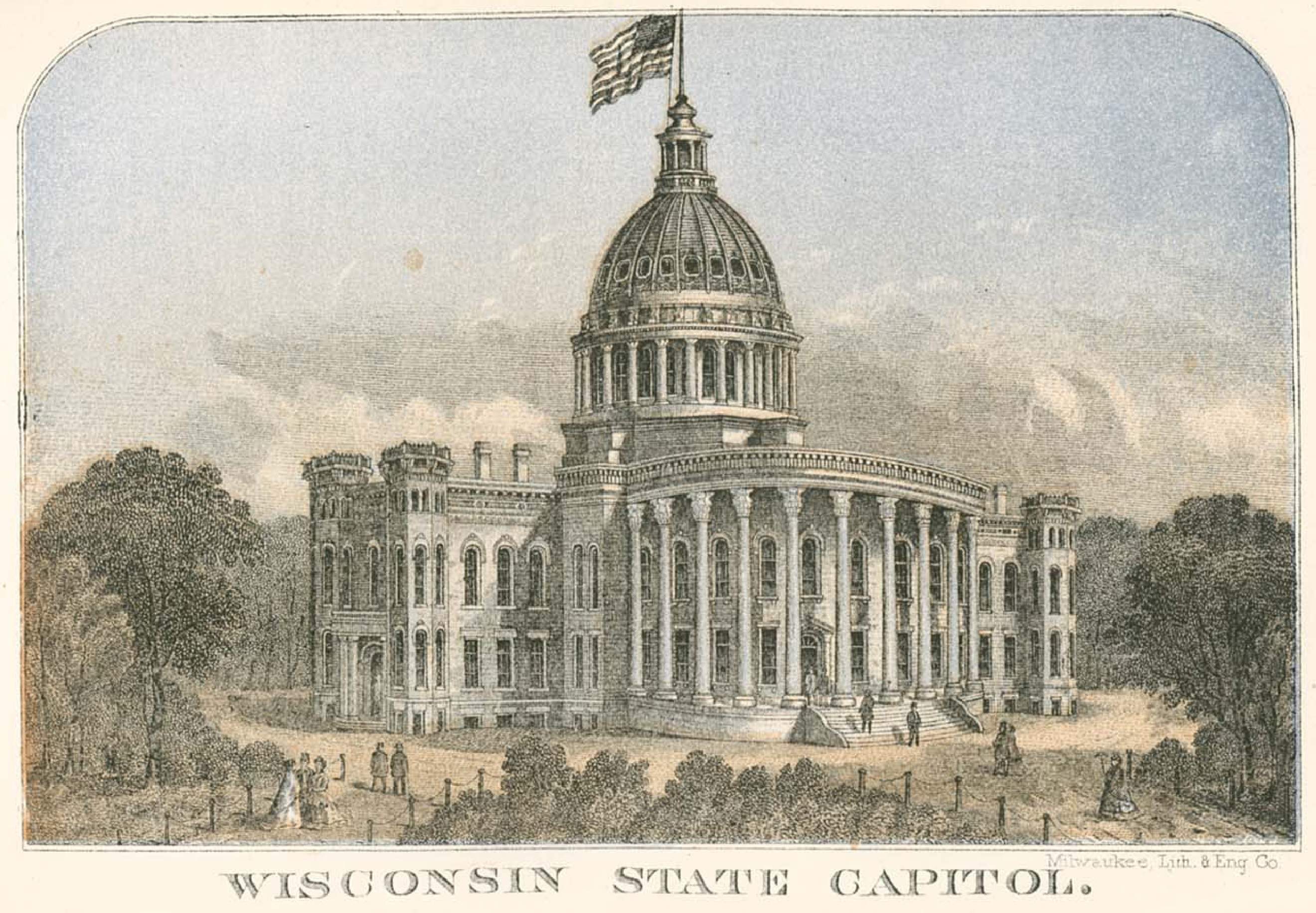
- Wisconsin State Capitol, 1863

Overview
- Legislative body: Wisconsin Legislature
- Meeting place: Wisconsin State Capitol
- Term: January 4, 1869 – January 3, 1870
- Election: November 3, 1868

Senate
- Members: 33
- Senate President: Wyman Spooner (R)
- President pro tempore: George C. Hazelton (R)
- Party control: Republican

Assembly
- Members: 100
- Assembly Speaker: Alexander M. Thomson (R)
- Party control: Republican

Sessions
- 1st: January 13, 1869 – March 11, 1869

The Twenty-Second Wisconsin Legislature convened from January 13, 1869, to March 11, 1869, in regular session.

Senators representing odd-numbered districts were newly elected for this session and were serving the first year of a two-year term. Assembly members were elected to a one-year term. Assembly members and odd-numbered senators were elected in the general election of November 3, 1868. Senators representing even-numbered districts were serving the second year of their two-year term, having been elected in the general election held on November 5, 1867.

The governor of Wisconsin during this entire term was Republican Lucius Fairchild, of Dane County, serving the second year of his second two-year term, having won re-election in the 1867 Wisconsin gubernatorial election.

== Major events ==
- January 27, 1869: Matthew H. Carpenter was elected United States Senator by the Wisconsin Legislature in Joint Session.
- March 4, 1869: Inauguration of Ulysses S. Grant as 18th President of the United States
- May 15, 1869: The National Woman Suffrage Association was founded in New York.

== Major legislation ==
- March 9, 1869: Joint Resolution ratifying the proposed amendment to the constitution of the United States, 1869 Joint Resolution 6.
- March 9, 1869: Joint Resolution proposing an amendment to the constitution of the state so as to authorize the abolishment of the grand jury system, 1869 Joint Resolution 7. This amendment was ratified at the November 1870 general election.
- March 10, 1869: An Act to codify the laws of this state relating to highways and bridges, 1869 Act 152
- March 11, 1869: Joint Resolution proposing amendment to section 4 article 7 of the constitution, 1869 Joint Resolution 8. Proposed expanding the Wisconsin Supreme Court from three to five justices. This amendment was rejected by voters in November 1872, but the court expansion was successful on a subsequent attempt in 1878.

== Party summary ==
=== Senate summary ===
Senate partisan composition Democratic: 14 seats Republican: 19 seats

| | Party (Shading indicates majority caucus) | | Total | |
| | Democratic | Republican | Total | Vacant |
|---|---|---|---|---|
| End of previous Legislature | 15 | 18 | 33 | 0 |
| 1st Session | 14 | 19 | 33 | 0 |
| Final voting share | 42.42% | 57.58% | | |
| Beginning of the next Legislature | 14 | 19 | 33 | 0 |

=== Assembly summary ===
Assembly partisan composition Democratic: 32 seats Republican: 68 seats

| | Party (Shading indicates majority caucus) | | | Total | |
| | Democratic | Ind. | Republican | Total | Vacant |
|---|---|---|---|---|---|
| End of previous Legislature | 41 | 0 | 59 | 100 | 0 |
| 1st Session | 32 | 0 | 68 | 100 | 0 |
| Final voting share | 32% | 0% | 68% | | |
| Beginning of the next Legislature | 39 | 1 | 60 | 100 | 0 |

== Sessions ==
- 1st Regular session: January 13, 1869 – March 11, 1869

== Leaders ==
=== Senate leadership ===
- President of the Senate: Wyman Spooner (R)
- President pro tempore: George C. Hazelton (R)

=== Assembly leadership ===
- Speaker of the Assembly: Alexander M. Thomson (R)

== Members ==
=== Members of the Senate ===
Members of the Wisconsin Senate for the Twenty-Second Wisconsin Legislature:

Senate partisan representation Democratic: 14 seats Republican: 19 seats

| Dist. | Counties | Senator | Residence | Party |
|---|---|---|---|---|
| 01 | Sheboygan | David Taylor | Sheboygan | Rep. |
| 02 | Brown, Door, Kewaunee | William J. Abrams | Green Bay | Dem. |
| 03 | Ozaukee | Lyman Morgan | Ozaukee | Dem. |
| 04 | Washington | Adam Schantz | Addison | Dem. |
| 05 | Milwaukee (Northern Half) | William P. Lynde | Milwaukee | Dem. |
| 06 | Milwaukee (Southern Half) | Charles H. Larkin | Milwaukee | Dem. |
| 07 | Racine | Henry Stevens | Caledonia | Rep. |
| 08 | Kenosha | Anthony Van Wyck | Kenosha | Rep. |
| 09 | Adams, Juneau, Monroe | William J. Kershaw | Big Spring | Rep. |
| 10 | Waukesha | Curtis Mann | Oconomowoc | Dem. |
| 11 | Dane (Eastern Part) | Nelson Williams | Stoughton | Rep. |
| 12 | Walworth | Newton Littlejohn | Whitewater | Rep. |
| 13 | Lafayette | Hamilton H. Gray | Darlington | Dem. |
| 14 | Sauk | Stephen S. Barlow | Delton | Rep. |
| 15 | Iowa | Lemuel W. Joiner | Wyoming | Rep. |
| 16 | Grant | George C. Hazelton | Boscobel | Rep. |
| 17 | Rock | Charles G. Williams | Janesville | Rep. |
| 18 | Dodge (Western Part) | Henry W. Lander | Beaver Dam | Dem. |
| 19 | Manitowoc | George B. Reed | Manitowoc | Dem. |
| 20 | Fond du Lac | Edward S. Bragg | Fond du Lac | Dem. |
| 21 | Winnebago | Ira W. Fisher | Menasha | Rep. |
| 22 | Calumet, Oconto, Outagamie, Shawano | William Young | Medina | Dem. |
| 23 | Jefferson | William W. Woodman | Farmington | Dem. |
| 24 | Green | Henry Adams | Monticello | Rep. |
| 25 | Columbia | William M. Griswold | Columbus | Rep. |
| 26 | Dane (Western Part) | Carl Habich | Madison | Dem. |
| 27 | Marathon, Portage, Waupaca, Wood | Charles M. Webb | Grand Rapids | Rep. |
| 28 | Ashland, Bayfield, Burnett, Dallas, Douglas, Pierce, St. Croix | William J. Copp | Prescott | Rep. |
| 29 | Green Lake, Marquette, Waushara | George D. Waring | Berlin | Rep. |
| 30 | Crawford, Richland | William Ketcham | Richland Center | Rep. |
| 31 | La Crosse & Vernon | Cyrus M. Butt | Viroqua | Rep. |
| 32 | Buffalo, Chippewa, Clark, Dunn, Eau Claire, Jackson, Pepin, Trempealeau | Alfred W. Newman | Trempealeau | Rep. |
| 33 | Dodge (Eastern Part) | Satterlee Clark | Horicon | Dem. |

=== Members of the Assembly ===
Members of the Assembly for the Twenty-Second Wisconsin Legislature:

Assembly partisan representation Democratic: 32 seats Republican: 68 seats

| Senate District | County | Dist. | Representative | Party | Residence |
|---|---|---|---|---|---|
| 09 | Adams | | Otis B. Lapham | Rep. | Friendship |
| 28 | Ashland, Bayfield, Burnett, Dallas, Douglas, Polk | | Henry D. Barron | Rep. | St. Croix Falls |
| 02 | Brown | 1 | Joseph S. Curtis | Rep. | Green Bay |
| 02 | Brown | 2 | Randall Wilcox | Dem. | De Pere |
| 32 | Buffalo | | Robert Henry | Rep. | Anchorage |
| 22 | Calumet | | Casper H. M. Petersen | Dem. | New Holstein |
| 32 | Chippewa & Dunn | | Thaddeus C. Pound | Rep. | Chippewa Falls |
| 32 | Clark & Jackson | | John B. G. Baxter | Rep. | Black River Falls |
| 25 | Columbia | 1 | A. J. Turner | Rep. | Portage |
| 25 | Columbia | 2 | Thornton Thompson | Rep. | Rio |
| 25 | Columbia | 3 | Freeman M. Ross | Rep. | Cambria |
| 30 | Crawford | | Benjamin F. Fay | Dem. | Prairie du Chien |
| 11 | Dane | 1 | John E. Johnson | Rep. | Utica |
| 11 | Dane | 2 | Knute Nelson | Rep. | Cambridge |
| 26 | Dane | 3 | John Adams | Dem. | Black Earth |
| 26 | Dane | 4 | Andrew Henry | Rep. | Madison |
| 26 | Dane | 5 | George B. Smith | Dem. | Madison |
| 18 | Dodge | 1 | Cyrus Perry | Rep. | Waterloo |
| 18 | Dodge | 2 | Rees Evans | Dem. | Beaver Dam |
| 33 | Dodge | 3 | Arthur K. Delaney | Dem. | Horicon |
| 33 | Dodge | 4 | Eugene O'Connor | Dem. | Watertown |
| 02 | Door & Kewaunee | | John R. McDonald | Rep. | Ahnapee |
| 32 | Eau Claire & Pepin | | Fayette Allen | Rep. | Durand |
| 20 | Fond du Lac | 1 | Henry C. Bottum | Rep. | West Rosendale |
| 20 | Fond du Lac | 2 | Benjamin H. Bettis | Rep. | Ladoga |
| 20 | Fond du Lac | 3 | Irenus K. Hamilton | Rep. | Fond du Lac |
| 20 | Fond du Lac | 4 | William S. Warner | Rep. | Lamartine |
| 20 | Fond du Lac | 5 | Andrew Dieringer | Dem. | Auburn |
| 20 | Fond du Lac | 6 | Charles Geisse | Dem. | Taycheedah |
| 16 | Grant | 1 | Joseph Harris | Rep. | Fairview |
| 16 | Grant | 2 | George H. Brock | Rep. | Potosi |
| 16 | Grant | 3 | William P. Dewey | Rep. | Lancaster |
| 16 | Grant | 4 | Benjamin M. Coates | Rep. | Boscobel |
| 16 | Grant | 5 | Alexander R. McCartney | Rep. | Cassville |
| 24 | Green | 1 | Jefferson F. Wescott | Rep. | Farmers Grove |
| 24 | Green | 2 | Thomas A. Jackson | Rep. | Brodhead |
| 29 | Green Lake | | Edwin L. Hoyt | Rep. | Manchester |
| 15 | Iowa | 1 | William E. Rowe | Rep. | Arena |
| 15 | Iowa | 2 | Abner Powell | Rep. | Mineral Point |
| 23 | Jefferson | 1 | John Rutledge | Dem. | Ixonia |
| 23 | Jefferson | 2 | Sylvester J. Conklin | Rep. | Waterloo |
| 23 | Jefferson | 3 | Joseph Winslow | Dem. | Fort Atkinson |
| 23 | Jefferson | 4 | James M. Bingham | Rep. | Palmyra |
| 09 | Juneau | | Jerome B. Potter | Dem. | Sentinel |
| 08 | Kenosha | | Samuel E. Tarbell | Rep. | Woodworth |
| 31 | La Crosse | 1 | Cassius C. Palmer | Rep. | West Salem |
| 31 | La Crosse | 2 | Nathan P. Waller | Rep. | West Salem |
| 13 | Lafayette | 1 | Charles Pole | Dem. | Shullsburg |
| 13 | Lafayette | 2 | Norman B. Richardson | Rep. | Warren |
| 19 | Manitowoc | 1 | John H. Bohne | Dem. | Meeme |
| 19 | Manitowoc | 2 | Richard Donovan | Dem. | Manitowoc |
| 19 | Manitowoc | 3 | Jabez L. Fobes | Rep. | Two Rivers |
| 27 | Marathon & Wood | | Henry Reed | Dem. | Grand Rapids |
| 29 | Marquette | | William Murphy | Dem. | Briggsville |
| 05 | Milwaukee | 1 | Patrick Drew | Dem. | Milwaukee |
| 05 | Milwaukee | 2 | George Abert | Dem. | Milwaukee |
| 06 | Milwaukee | 3 | James Hoye | Dem. | Milwaukee |
| 06 | Milwaukee | 4 | Samuel C. West | Rep. | Milwaukee |
| 06 | Milwaukee | 5 | John Fellenz | Dem. | Milwaukee |
| 05 | Milwaukee | 6 | Joseph Phillips | Dem. | Milwaukee |
| 05 | Milwaukee | 7 | Daniel H. Johnson | Rep. | Milwaukee |
| 05 | Milwaukee | 8 | Henry C. Runkel | Dem. | Milwaukee |
| 06 | Milwaukee | 9 | Henry Roethe | Dem. | Painesville |
| 06 | Milwaukee | 10 | John Scheffel | Dem. | Milwaukee |
| 09 | Monroe | | Jesse Bennett | Rep. | Sparta |
| 22 | Oconto & Shawano | | Parlan Semple | Rep. | Shawano |
| 22 | Outagamie | | Charles E. McIntosh | Dem. | Lime Rock |
| 03 | Ozaukee | | Job Haskell | Dem. | Saukville |
| 28 | Pierce | | Edward H. Ives | Dem. | Prescott |
| 27 | Portage | | Frederick Huntley | Rep. | Buena Vista |
| 07 | Racine | 1 | Albert L. Phillips | Rep. | Racine |
| 07 | Racine | 2 | Hiram L. Gilmore | Rep. | North Cape |
| 30 | Richland | | Joseph M. Thomas | Rep. | Lone Rock |
| 17 | Rock | 1 | Seth Fisher | Rep. | Center |
| 17 | Rock | 2 | Darwin E. Maxon | Rep. | Milton |
| 17 | Rock | 3 | Adelmorn Sherman | Rep. | Janesville |
| 17 | Rock | 4 | Charles H. Parker | Rep. | Beloit |
| 17 | Rock | 5 | Alexander M. Thomson | Rep. | Janesville |
| 14 | Sauk | 1 | Carl C. Kuntz | Rep. | Black Hawk |
| 14 | Sauk | 2 | John Gillespie | Rep. | Dellona |
| 01 | Sheboygan | 1 | Thomas M. Blackstock | Rep. | Sheboygan |
| 01 | Sheboygan | 2 | Sylvester Caldwell | Rep. | Cascade |
| 01 | Sheboygan | 3 | George S. Graves | Rep. | Sheboygan Falls |
| 28 | St. Croix | | Charles D. Parker | Rep. | Pleasant Valley |
| 32 | Trempealeau | | Douglas Arnold | Rep. | Williamsburg |
| 31 | Vernon | 1 | John M. McLees | Rep. | Harmony |
| 31 | Vernon | 2 | Van S. Bennett | Rep. | Webster |
| 12 | Walworth | 1 | A. G. Kellam | Rep. | Delavan |
| 12 | Walworth | 2 | John A. Smith | Rep. | Geneva |
| 12 | Walworth | 3 | Daniel Hooper | Rep. | Troy |
| 04 | Washington | 1 | John Kastler | Dem. | Wayne |
| 04 | Washington | 2 | Densmore W. Maxon | Dem. | Cedar Creek |
| 10 | Waukesha | 1 | Vernon Tichenor | Rep. | Waukesha |
| 10 | Waukesha | 2 | Edwin Hurlbut | Rep. | Oconomowoc |
| 10 | Waukesha | 3 | James McDonald | Dem. | Sussex |
| 27 | Waupaca | | Milan H. Sessions | Rep. | Waupaca |
| 29 | Waushara | | Joseph N. P. Bird | Rep. | Wautoma |
| 21 | Winnebago | 1 | Luther Buxton | Rep. | Oshkosh |
| 21 | Winnebago | 2 | George W. Trask | Rep. | Winneconne |
| 21 | Winnebago | 3 | James H. Foster | Rep. | Koro |

== Employees ==
=== Senate employees ===
- Chief Clerk: L. B. Hills
  - Assistant Clerk: John S. Wilson
    - Bookkeeper: H. H. Rust
  - Engrossing Clerk: J. H. Culvor
  - Enrolling Clerk: W. T. Brayton
  - Transcribing Clerk: E. M. Truell
- Sergeant-at-Arms: W. H. Hamilton
  - Assistant Sergeant-at-Arms: Franklin Kelly
- Postmaster: T. L. Terry
  - Assistant Postmaster: George Pietssch
- Doorkeeper: John McGill
  - Assistant Doorkeeper: P. C. Selden
  - Assistant Doorkeeper: J. K. Parish
  - Assistant Doorkeeper: Mark Shepard
  - Gallery Doorkeeper: Henry Taylor
  - Night Watch: E. C. Arnold
- Porter & Mess: Martin Mulville
- Messengers:
  - Robert B. McCord
  - Charlie S. Vedder
  - George Webster
  - V. Wilson
  - William Gleason
  - Edward Knight

=== Assembly employees ===
- Chief Clerk: Ephraim W. Young
  - Assistant Clerk: William M. Newcomb
    - Bookkeeper: Fred A. Dennett
  - Engrossing Clerk: A. H. Reed
  - Enrolling Clerk: E. H. Webb
  - Transcribing Clerk: E. C. Clark
- Sergeant-at-Arms: R. C. Kelly
  - 1st Assistant Sergeant-at-Arms: Sam Fifield
  - 2nd Assistant Sergeant-at-Arms: E. A. Gibbons
- Postmaster: C. F. Solberg
  - 1st Assistant Postmaster: Sam Bartholomew
  - 2nd Assistant Postmaster: H. C. Warner
- Doorkeepers:
  - A. McLaughlin
  - T. H. Grist
  - J. Dickinson
  - H. Seffens
- Night Watch: James Roberts
- Firemen:
  - J. Warren
  - Samuel Bachman
- Speaker's Messenger: Parke I. Graves
- Chief Clerk's Messenger: Frank R. Norton
- Messengers:
  - Thomas McDonald
  - Charles H. Newton
  - Henry A. Douglass
  - Emile Hammer
  - George Aiken
  - Howley Baxter
  - C. Bingham
  - G. F. Hibbard
  - Dan Fitzpatrick
- Gallery Attendants:
  - William Woolnough
  - W. P. Borroughs
