= Wisconsin's 29th Assembly district =

American legislative district in western Wisconsin

Wisconsin's 29th State Assembly district
- 2024 map defined in 2023 Wisc. Act 94; 2022 map defined in Johnson v. Wisconsin Elections Commission; 2011 map was defined in 2011 Wisc. Act 43
Assemblymember
Treig Pronschinske; R–Mondovi
since January 6, 2025 (1 years)
- Demographics: 91.25% White; 0.58% Black; 5.66% Hispanic; 0.56% Asian; 1.69% Native American; 0.09% Hawaiian/Pacific Islander
- Population (2020) • Voting age: 59,983; 46,148
- Website: Official website
- Notes: Northwest Wisconsin

The 29th Assembly district of Wisconsin is one of 99 districts in the Wisconsin State Assembly. Located in western Wisconsin, the district comprises all of Buffalo and Pepin counties, along with most of Pierce County, and much of Trempealeau County. It includes the cities of Alma, Arcadia, Blair, Buffalo City, Durand, Fountain City, Independence, Mondovi, Prescott, and Whitehall. The district also contains Trempealeau National Wildlife Refuge and Perrot State Park. The district is represented by Republican Treig Pronschinske, since January 2025; Pronschinske previously represented the 92nd district from 2017 to 2025.

The 29th Assembly district is located within Wisconsin's 10th Senate district, along with the 28th and 30th Assembly districts.

Northern portions of the 29th assembly district are within the Minneapolis-Saint Paul Metropolitan Area.

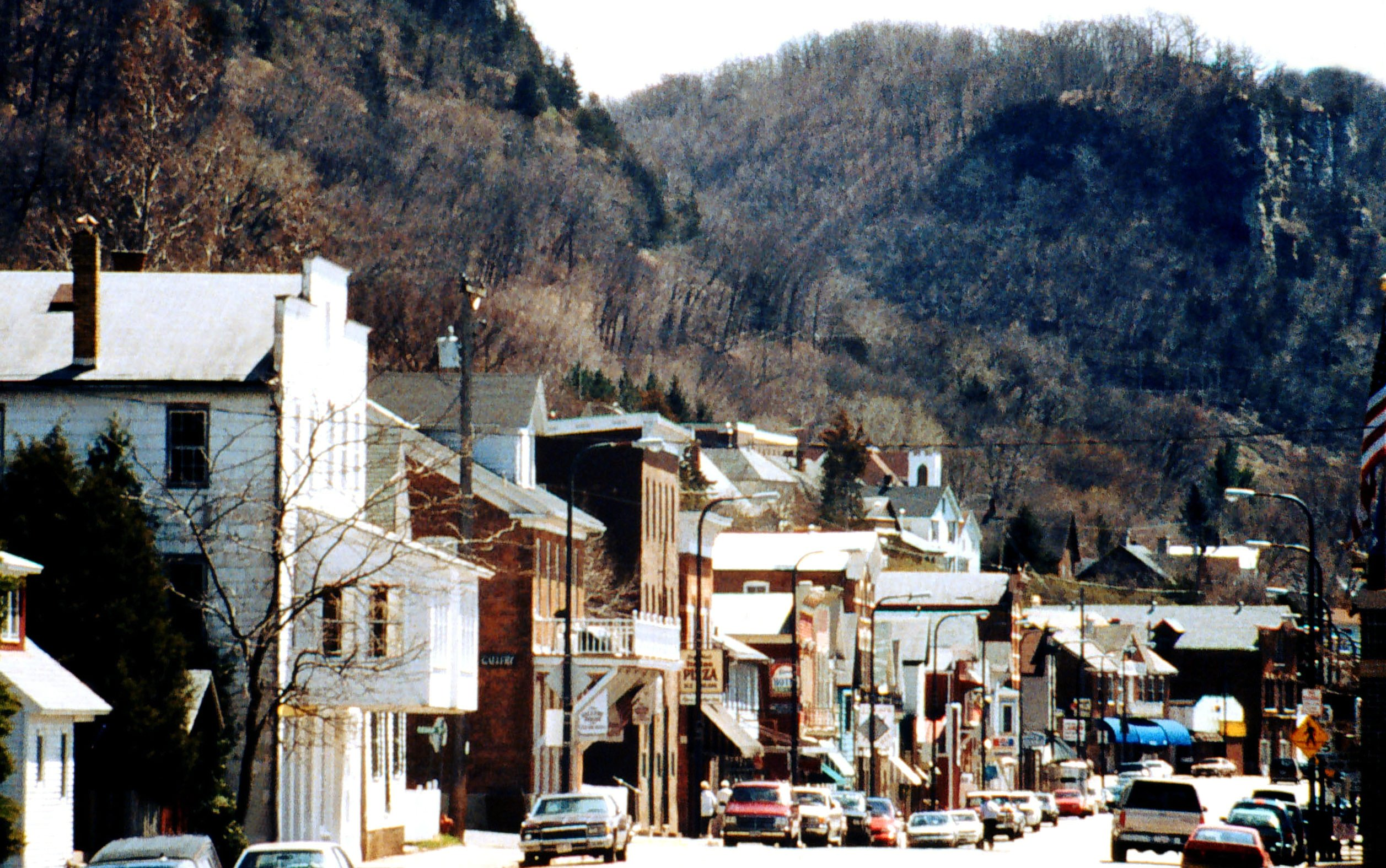
Alma Historic District

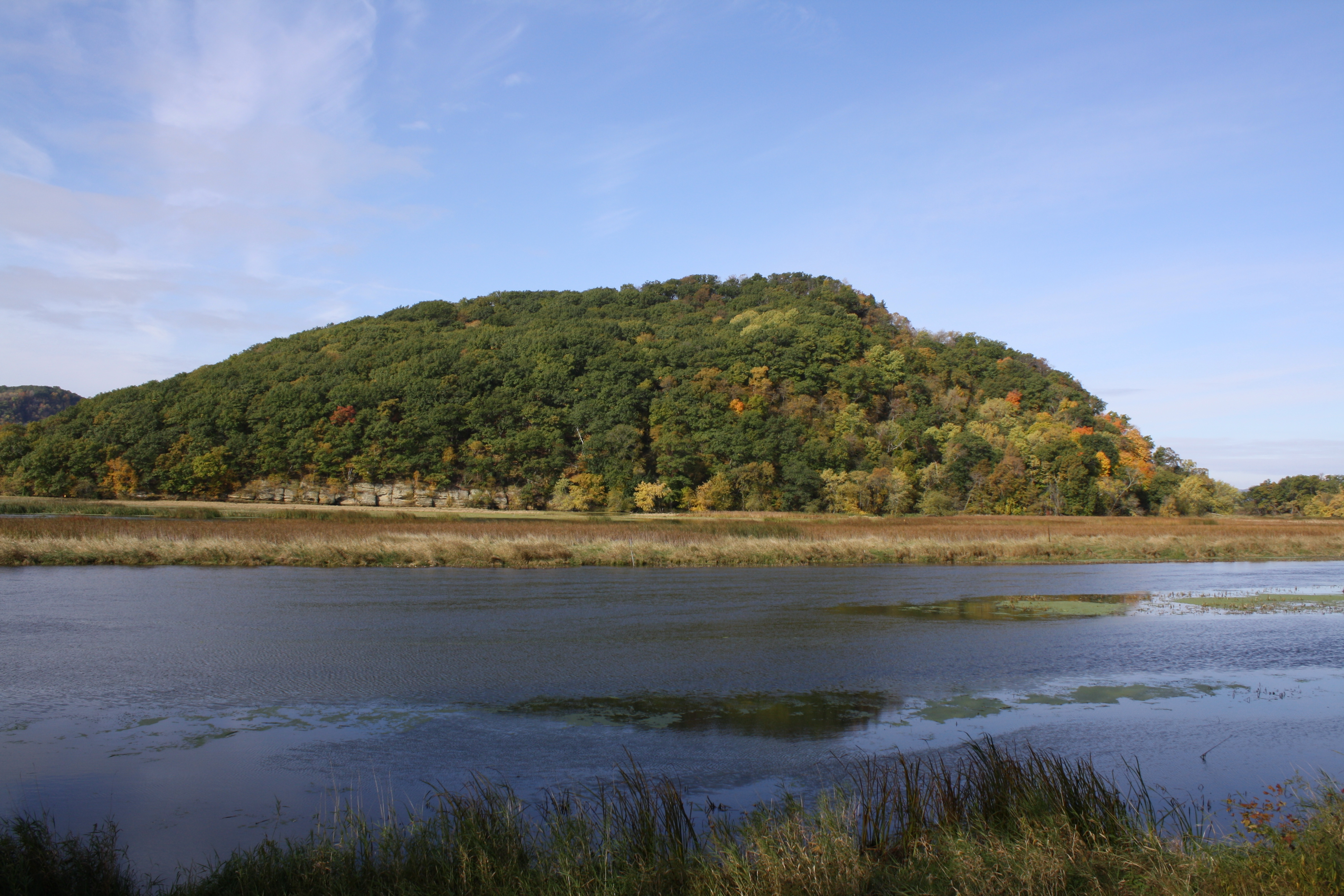
Trempealeau Mountain in Perrot State Park

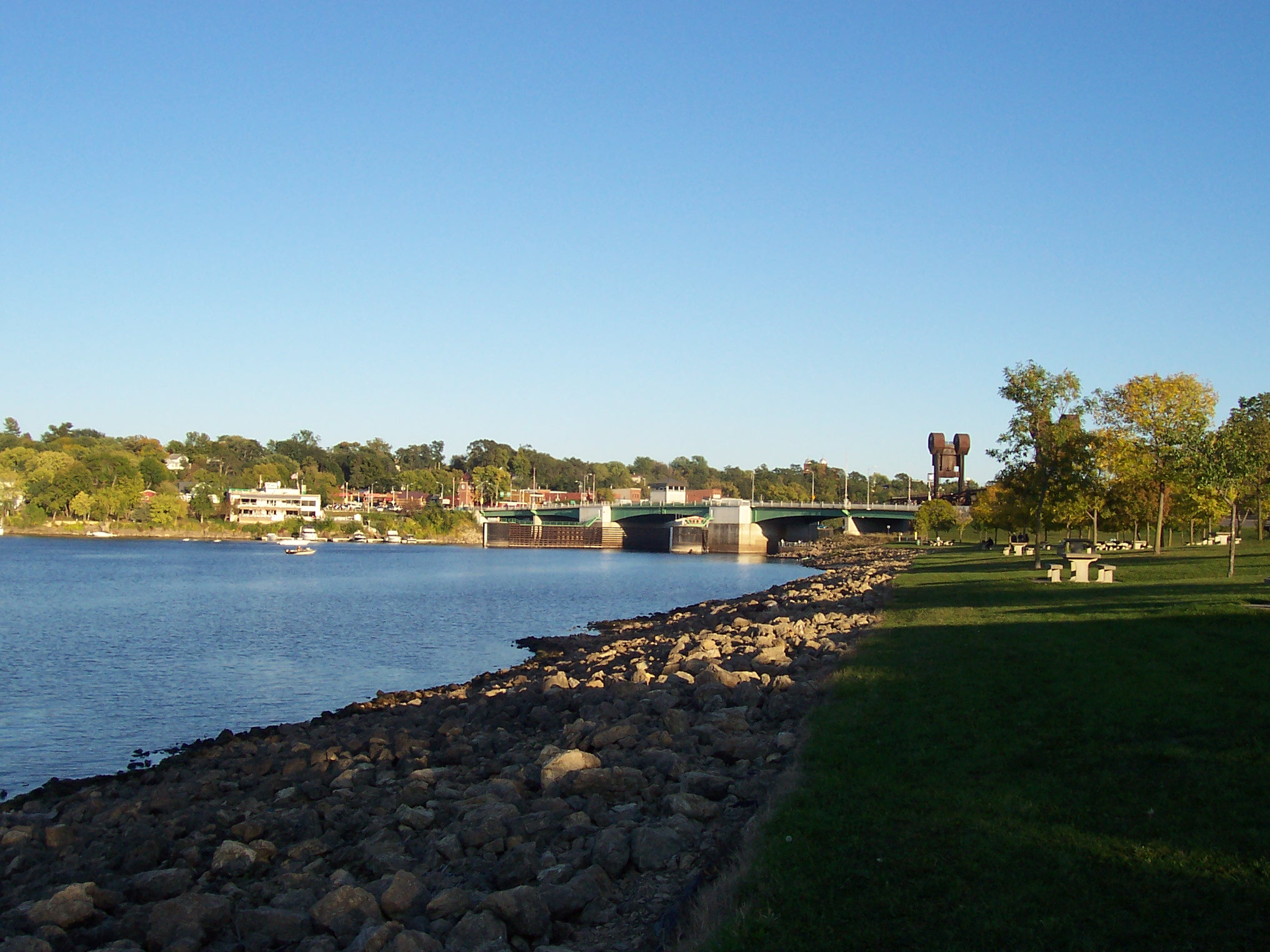
Prescott, Wisconsin

== List of past representatives ==
List of representatives to the Wisconsin State Assembly from the 29th district
Member	Party	Residence	Counties represented	Term start	Term end	Ref.
District created
Leo Mohn	Dem.	Woodville	Pierce, Polk, St. Croix	January 1, 1973	January 1, 1979	
Robert W. Harer	Rep.	Baldwin	Pierce, Polk, St. Croix	January 1, 1979	January 3, 1983	
Raymond J. Moyer	Dem.	Rochester	Racine, Walworth, Waukesha	January 3, 1983	January 7, 1985	
Richard Shoemaker	Dem.	Menomonie	Dunn, St. Croix	January 7, 1985	January 2, 1989	
Alvin Baldus	Dem.	Menomonie	Dunn, Pierce, St. Croix	January 2, 1989	January 6, 1997	
Joe Plouff	Dem.	Menomonie	Dunn, Pierce, St. Croix	January 6, 1997	January 3, 2005	
Andy Lamb	Rep.	Menomonie	Dunn, Pierce, St. Croix	January 3, 2005	January 1, 2007	
John Murtha	Rep.	Baldwin	Dunn, St. Croix	January 1, 2007	January 3, 2017	
Rob Stafsholt	Rep.	New Richmond	Dunn, St. Croix	January 3, 2017	January 4, 2021	
Clint Moses	Rep.	Menomonie	Dunn, St. Croix	January 4, 2021	January 6, 2025	
Clint Moses	Rep.	Menomonie	Dunn, Polk, St. Croix	January 4, 2021	January 6, 2025	
Treig Pronschinske	Rep.	Mondovi	Buffalo, Pepin, Pierce, Trempealeau	January 6, 2025	Current	
