= William J. Copp =

19th century American politician

Member of the Wisconsin Senate from the 28th district
- In office January 6, 1868 – January 3, 1870
- Preceded by: Marcus Fulton
- Succeeded by: Edward H. Ives

Member of the Wisconsin State Assembly from the Pierce–St. Croix district
- In office January 1, 1866 – January 7, 1867
- Preceded by: Marcus Fulton
- Succeeded by: John D. Trumbull (Pierce); H. L. Wadsworth (St. Croix)

County Judge of Pierce County, Wisconsin
- In office November 15, 1853 – January 1, 1855
- Preceded by: Position established
- Succeeded by: Mason Stone

Personal details
- Born: August 13, 1811 St. Marys, Georgia, U.S.
- Died: December 15, 1889 (aged 78) Winchester, Tennessee, U.S.
- Resting place: Pine Glen Cemetery, Prescott, Wisconsin
- Party: Democratic (after 1873); Liberal Rep. (1872–1873); Republican (1854–1872); Natl. Union (1863–1867); Whig (before 1854)
- Spouse: Charlotte Lindsay (m. 1839–1889)
- Children: Maria Asenath Copp^{(b. 1838; died 1904)}; Benjamin Denison Copp^{(b. 1841; died 1899)}; Joseph Matthew Copp^{(b. 1843; died 1883)}; Alice Lindsay Copp^{(b. 1848; died 1866)}
- Relatives: Belton A. Copp (brother)

William Johnson Copp (August 13, 1811 – December 15, 1889) was an American lawyer, Republican politician, and Wisconsin pioneer. He was one of the founders of Pierce County, Wisconsin, and served as the first Pierce county judge. He also served in the Wisconsin Senate (1868 & 1869) and State Assembly (1866), representing much of northwestern Wisconsin.

== Early life and career ==
William J. Copp was born August 13, 1811, at St. Marys, Georgia. As a child, he moved with his family to St. Augustine, Florida, where his father died in 1822. For a time, Copp returned to Georgia, where his brother Belton A. Copp had established a legal practice. He later went to Winchester, Tennessee, where another brother, Joseph, had become established as a pastor.

In Tennessee, Copp became involved in politics with the Whig Party, and was active in the 1844 United States presidential election on behalf of Henry Clay. During that time, he was also actively studying law. Shortly after the 1844 election, Copp moved to Aberdeen, Mississippi, where he was a junior law partner to his wife's brother, Matthew W. Lindsay. He continued his political activity in Mississippi and was a delegate from Monroe County to the 1845 Whig state convention. He also became involved in the Temperance movement, and was an officer in the "Sons of Temperance" chapter in Monroe County. In 1851, Lindsay, Copp, and their short-lived third partner, Goode, moved their practice from Mississippi back to Tennessee.

== Wisconsin years ==
Copp came to northwest Wisconsin in 1852, buying up land at what is now Prescott, Wisconsin, in partnership with Orrin T. Maxson. Maxson and Copp then collaborated to plat a village at the site—which sits at the confluence of the Mississippi and St. Croix rivers—and began promoting their village to attract settlers and investors.

In 1853, Pierce County was established with the town board of Prescott constituting the first county board of Pierce. At the first election in November 1853, 110 votes were cast and Copp was elected the first county judge of the new county. The following year, rather than running for re-election, he ran for Wisconsin circuit court judge, but came in third in the election, behind Benjamin Allen and the victor, S. S. N. Fuller.

That year, Copp also joined the new Republican Party. In 1855, he was the Republican nominee for Wisconsin State Assembly in the Assembly district comprising all the northwest border counties from Pierce County to what is now Ashland County. But again, Copp fell short of his Democratic opponent, Almon D. Gray.

Copp won his first state office in 1865, running for Wisconsin State Assembly on the National Union ticket. He served in the 1866 legislative session, representing the district of Pierce and St. Croix counties.

He didn't run for re-election in 1867, but the following year became the Republican nominee for Wisconsin Senate in the 28th Senate district. The district then comprised roughly the same geographic region as his first race for Assembly, in 1855. He went on to represent the district in the 1868 and 1869 legislative sessions. During the 1869 session, Copp was a staunch supporter of Cadwallader C. Washburn seeking to be named U.S. senator, but Washburn lost out to Matthew H. Carpenter.

At the 1869 Republican state convention, Copp sought the nomination for Lieutenant Governor of Wisconsin, but Thaddeus C. Pound easily won the nomination on the first ballot.

In 1872, Copp began to split from the Republican Party and supported the presidential campaign of Liberal Republican Horace Greeley. He subsequently followed the liberal republicans into alliance with the Democratic Party.

He ran for office one final time in 1879, running as the Democratic nominee for Wisconsin State Assembly in the Pierce County district, but he came in a distant third behind the Republican incumbent Nils P. Haugen and a third party Greenbacker. He may have been damaged by some voters accidentally casting their votes in the name of his son, but still would not have had enough votes to overcome Haugen's majority.

In his later years, he returned to Winchester, Tennessee, where he died in December 1889.

== Personal life and family ==
William J. Copp was the sixth of eight children born to Daniel Copp and his wife Sarah (née Allyn). Daniel Copp was raised in Connecticut and was a farmer by upbringing, but after moving to Georgia he became involved in the shipping industry and owned one or two sailing vessels. Daniel Copp may have been appointed mayor of St. Augustine, Florida, during Andrew Jackson's time as military governor of the territory. William Copp's mother, Sarah Allyn, was a descendant of Robert Allyn, who came to Connecticut from the Massachusetts Bay Colony in 1651 and was one of the first settlers of Norwich, Connecticut. William Copp was also a descendant, via his paternal grandmother, of the colonist George Denison, who came to the Massachusetts Bay Colony from England about 1640.

William Copp's eldest brother Belton Allyn Copp inherited the Allyn properties in Connecticut and returned there after their parents' deaths. He went on to serve in the Connecticut House of Representatives and was a county judge.

William J. Copp married Charlotte Lindsay at Knoxville, Tennessee, about 1839. They had four children together, though one daughter died young.

Their elder son, Benjamin Denison Copp, studied medicine with Copp's one-time business partner Orrin T. Maxson and then graduated from Chicago Medical College. He went on to practice medicine in Chicago for over 20 years.

Their younger son, Joseph Matthew Copp, served in Company A of the 12th Wisconsin Infantry Regiment through most of the American Civil War. He also had a close connection with Copp's former partner, Orrin T. Maxson, who served as captain of his company through nearly his entire service in the war. After the war, Joseph became a lawyer.

== Electoral history ==
=== Lieutenant Governor of Wisconsin (1869) ===
Wisconsin Lieutenant Gubernatorial Election, 1869
Party	Candidate	Votes	%	±%
Vote of the State Convention, 1st ballot, September 10, 1869
Republican	Thaddeus C. Pound	152	57.79%	
Republican	William W. Field	35	13.31%	
Republican	William J. Copp	30	11.41%	
Republican	Newton Littlejohn	30	11.41%	
Republican	Stoddard Judd	7	2.66%	
Republican	Wyman Spooner	2	0.76%	
Republican	C. S. Kelsey	2	0.76%	
Republican	A. A. Field	1	0.38%	
Republican	C. G. Young	1	0.38%	
Republican	David Taylor	1	0.38%	
	Scattering	2	3.03%	
Plurality		117	44.49%	
Total votes		263	100.0%	

Wisconsin State Assembly
Preceded by Marcus Fulton	Member of the Wisconsin State Assembly from the Pierce–St. Croix district January 1, 1866 – January 7, 1867	Succeeded by John D. Trumbull (Pierce); H. L. Wadsworth (St. Croix)
Wisconsin Senate
Preceded by Marcus Fulton	Member of the Wisconsin Senate from the 28th district January 6, 1868 – January 3, 1870	Succeeded by Edward H. Ives
Legal offices
New county government	County Judge of Pierce County, Wisconsin; November 15, 1853 – January 1, 1855	Succeeded by Mason Stone
