= Senator Fulton =

Senator Fulton may refer to:

- Charles William Fulton (1853–1918), Oregon State Senate
- James G. Fulton (1903–1971), Pennsylvania State Senate
- John H. Fulton (1792–1836), Virginia State Senate
- Marcus Fulton (died 1892), Wisconsin State Senate
- Richard Fulton (1927–2018), Tennessee State Senate
- Robert D. Fulton (born 1929), Iowa State Senate
- Tony Fulton (Nebraska politician) (born 1972), Nebraska State Senate
- William S. Fulton (1795–1844), U.S. Senator from Arkansas from 1836 to 1844
