= Orrin T. Maxson =

19th century American politician

Member of the Wisconsin State Assembly
- In office January 5, 1857 – January 4, 1858
- Preceded by: Position established
- Succeeded by: Lucius Cannon
- Constituency: Chippewa–Clark–Dunn–Pierce district
- In office January 3, 1853 – January 2, 1854
- Preceded by: Otis W. Hoyt
- Succeeded by: William M. Torbert
- Constituency: La Pointe–St. Croix district

Personal details
- Born: March 17, 1823 Centerville, New York, U.S.
- Died: May 12, 1895 (aged 72) Pasadena, California, U.S.
- Cause of death: Drug overdose
- Resting place: Rosehill Cemetery, Chicago
- Party: Republican; Democratic (before 1854)
- Spouse: Eunice McCray
- Children: Almira E. Maxson^{(b. 1843; died 1862)}; Orrin Prescott Maxson^{(b. 1855; died 1936)}; Amelia (Knox)^{(b. 1859; died 1934)}
- Relatives: Joseph W. Beardsley (brother-in-law); Densmore Maxon (sixth cousin)
- Education: Rush Medical College
- Profession: Physician

Military service
- Allegiance: United States
- Branch/service: United States Volunteers (Union Army)
- Years of service: 1861–1864
- Rank: Captain, USV
- Unit: 12th Reg. Wis. Vol. Infantry
- Battles/wars: American Civil War: Vicksburg campaign; Atlanta campaign

Orrin Teall Maxson (March 17, 1823 – May 12, 1895) was an American physician, politician, and Wisconsin pioneer. He was an important early settler of Prescott, Wisconsin, and represented northwestern Wisconsin in the Wisconsin State Assembly during the 1853 and 1857 legislative sessions. His name was often abbreviated O. T. Maxson; his last name was sometimes spelled Maxon.

== Early life ==
Orrin T. Maxson was born March 17, 1823, (Note: His detailed biography in Album of Genealogy and Biography, Cook County, Illinois states his birth date as March 29, 1824, but I think we should accept the date of birth from his tombstone, March 17, 1823.) in Centerville, New York, where his father was a pioneer settler. He was raised and educated in Centerville. During these formative years, his father and older brother, Arthur, went to the Wisconsin Territory in 1837 and became some of the first settlers at what is now Darien, Wisconsin. They also established the first sawmill there in 1841.

Orrin attended Rush Medical College in Chicago and graduated in the class of 1849. After his time in medical school he went west for a year and helped establish a hospital in Colorado.

== Prescott settlement and political career ==
After a year in Colorado, Maxson came back to Wisconsin to the site of what is now Prescott, Wisconsin. That site had first been settled by Philander Prescott in 1841, but had languished due to land disputes with the federal government and the influential American Fur Company. Maxson was one of the pioneers who finally broke this impasse, buying out some of the original fur trading interests and establishing the first store in 1851. In 1852 and 1853, Maxson went about purchasing much of the land which is now Prescott, Wisconsin, in partnership with William J. Copp. They had the site platted and surveyed and actively promoted the growth of the settlement, and Maxson operated a medical practice there for the next fifteen years.

Maxson was appointed the first postmaster at Prescott in 1852. The first school district in the area was also organized in 1852, and Maxson was elected the first clerk of the school district in the fall of 1852.

That same fall, Maxson was elected to the Wisconsin State Assembly, running on the Democratic Party ticket. He represented the vast northwest district, stretching along the border and coast from what is now Pierce County in the south to what is now Ashland County in the north.

Pierce County was first organized in 1853, and that fall Maxson was selected as the first justice of the peace. After the creation of the Republican Party in 1854, Maxson became a member of the new party. Through the 1850s, Maxson was identified with a group of Republican men in Prescott referred to as the "Waukegan Clique", including Austin H. Young. Maxson most likely met some of them while attending college in Illinois.

He next ran for state office in 1856 and was elected to another term in the Wisconsin State Assembly. His district this time stretched from Pierce County into the core of the northwest quadrant of Wisconsin, including the areas that are now Clark, Chippewa, Eau Claire, Dunn, Pepin, Rusk, and Price counties.

Following the 1857 legislative session, Maxson was appointed to the first board of regents of the Wisconsin Normal School, serving until 1861. During these years, he also became involved in the movement establishing agricultural societies, becoming one of the founders of the Pierce County Agricultural Society and an officer in the state Agricultural Society.

== Civil War service ==
At the outbreak of the American Civil War, Maxson assisted in raising a company of volunteers for the Union Army and was chosen as first lieutenant of that company. His company was enrolled as Company A in the 12th Wisconsin Infantry Regiment. They mustered into federal service in January 1862 and went south for service in the western theater of the war. They had a difficult time moving through Illinois due to problems with the railroad and insufficient winter lodgings, but eventually arrived at Weston, Missouri. There, Maxson's company's captain, Norman McLeod, resigned, and Maxson was promoted to captain of the company. He would lead the company for the next two years of the war.

After several months in Kansas, they were moved to Kentucky and Tennessee, where they repaired and secured railroads and hunted guerillas. They arrived at Corinth after the Second Battle of Corinth, and then joined Grant's Vicksburg Campaign, and were invested in the siege of Vicksburg up to its surrender in July 1863. Afterward, they were involved in pacifying remaining Confederate resistance in southern Mississippi and Louisiana until they received a veterans' furlough in March 1864. Returning from their furlough in Wisconsin, they met the non-veteran members of the regiment and then joined Sherman's Atlanta campaign, meeting the Army of the Tennessee at Acworth, Georgia, in June.

Shortly after arriving, they participated in preliminary actions leading toward the Battle of Kennesaw Mountain, at which Maxson distinguished himself. At the time, the Union and Confederate lines were entrenched about 1,000 yards apart. After a massing of Confederate forces was noticed in a nearby wooded area, Maxson was appointed to lead a small force of volunteers from the 12th Wisconsin Infantry to ascertain the disposition of this Confederate force. After crossing the field, they navigated through the wood and found himself on the flank of a Confederate rifle pit, and poured on enfilading fire into the trench. The Confederates fled back to their reserve lines until reinforced by a brigade, which exchanged fire with Maxson's detachment, which soon withdrew in good order. Maxson received compliments from his brigade, division, and corps commanders, including General James B. McPherson. Maxson's commander, George E. Bryant, then serving as brigade commander, wrote of Maxson's reconnaissance in his official report on the events leading up to the capture of Atlanta.

In early July, Maxson again played a leading role in skirmishing around the Nickajack Creek. Maxson led a rapid advancing skirmishing line which forced Confederates to abandon trenches and flee to the other side of the river. After securing the river, a few days later they led the advance across the river along with the 16th Wisconsin Infantry Regiment. They came under intense fire in open field, but charged directly into a Confederate trench, engaging in hand-to-hand combat. The 12th Regiment had been reduced to 600 combat-ready men before the start of this charge and lost another 134 in the attack, but captured the line along with hundreds of Confederate firearms. The next day, the Confederates attempted a strong counterattack which captured a number of positions along the line. The 12th Wisconsin Infantry held a critical angle on the line against the Confederate counterattack and poured on devastating fire until other Union forces were able to move up to the Confederate flank. They were then engaged in the trench lines until the capture of Atlanta.

Shortly after the fall of Atlanta, Maxson's three-year enlistment expired and he returned to Wisconsin.

== Later years ==
After the war, Maxson joined in the effort to try to establish an industrial school in Wisconsin. In the late 1860s, he moved to Waukegan, Illinois, where he resumed his medical practice. He remained there until 1883, when he moved his practice to the village of South Evanston, Illinois. He was active again in local government before and after South Evanston was annexed into Evanston.

In the 1890s, Maxson's health began to decline and he was forced to give up his medical practice. He moved west to Pasadena, California, hoping the climate would improve his health. He often took morphine to address pain, and on May 12, 1895, he overdosed on morphine and died at his home in Pasadena.

== Personal life and family ==
Orrin Maxson was the sixth of seven children born to Joseph Maxson III and his wife Amelia (née Ward). Joseph Maxson was born in Rhode Island but left home at age 17. With just two cents to his name, he bartered his shoes in exchange for an axe and used the axe to clear a farm for himself in Allegany County, New York. His farm would become the first settlement in what is now Centerville, New York. In 1837, he became a pioneer again, when he was one of the first settlers at what is now Darien, Wisconsin.

The Maxsons were descended from the colonist Richard Maxson, who came to the Massachusetts Bay Colony from England in the early 1630s. Orrin's younger sister, Caroline, married Joseph W. Beardsley, another pioneer of Prescott, Wisconsin. Densmore Maxon, who was also a prominent Wisconsin politician at roughly the same time as Orrin, was a distant (sixth) cousin.

In December 1846, Orrin T. Maxson married Eunice McCray of Tolland, Connecticut. They had five children, but at least one daughter died young. Their only known surviving son was Orrin Prescott Maxson, who also became a successful physician in the Chicago area.

== Notes ==
Wisconsin State Assembly
Preceded by Otis W. Hoyt	Member of the Wisconsin State Assembly from the La Pointe–St. Croix district January 3, 1853 – January 2, 1854	Succeeded by William M. Torbert
District established by 1856 Wisc. Act 109	Member of the Wisconsin State Assembly from the Chippewa–Clark–Dunn–Pierce district January 5, 1857 – January 4, 1858	Succeeded by Lucius Cannon
