= Herman L. Humphrey =

American politician (1830–1902)

The Honorable Herman L. Humphrey
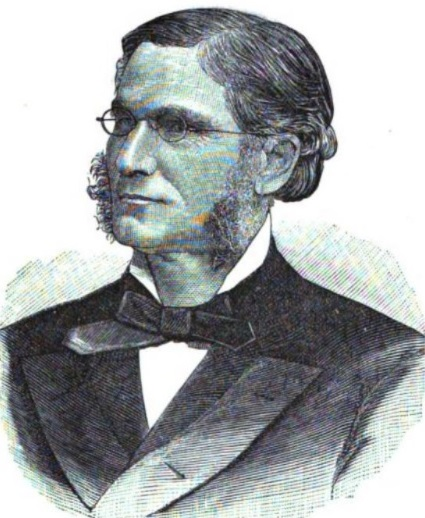
- From 1882's Public Men of To-Day

Member of the U.S. House of Representatives from Wisconsin's 7th district
- In office March 4, 1877 – March 3, 1883
- Preceded by: Jeremiah Rusk
- Succeeded by: Gilbert M. Woodward

Wisconsin Circuit Court Judge for the 8th Circuit
- In office January 1, 1867 – March 4, 1877
- Preceded by: Lucien P. Wetherby
- Succeeded by: Egbert B. Bundy

8th Mayor of Hudson, Wisconsin
- In office April 1865 – April 1866
- Preceded by: C. R. Coon
- Succeeded by: J. H. Brown

Member of the Wisconsin Senate from the 28th district
- In office January 6, 1862 – January 4, 1864
- Preceded by: Charles B. Cox
- Succeeded by: Austin H. Young

Member of the Wisconsin State Assembly from the St. Croix district
- In office January 3, 1887 – January 7, 1889
- Preceded by: Thomas Porter
- Succeeded by: Edward Conner

Personal details
- Born: March 14, 1830 Candor, New York, U.S.
- Died: June 10, 1902 (aged 72) Hudson, Wisconsin, U.S.
- Resting place: Old Willow River Cemetery, Hudson, Wisconsin
- Party: Republican
- Spouses: Jennie Ann Cross (m. 1855; died 1880); Kitty Elvira Door (m. 1881–1902)
- Children: Herman Jr., Fannie, Mary, William, and Grace

Herman Loin Humphrey (March 14, 1830 – June 10, 1902) was an American attorney, judge, and Republican politician. He served three terms in the United States House of Representatives, representing Wisconsin's 7th congressional district (1877–1883). Prior to his election to Congress, he was a Wisconsin circuit court judge for ten years in western Wisconsin, and served two years in the Wisconsin State Senate. Some sources give his middle name as Leon.

== Biography ==
Born in Candor, New York, Humphrey attended the public schools, except for one year spent at the Cortland Academy, in Homer, New York. At age 16, he was employed as a merchant's clerk in Ithaca, New York. While living in Ithaca, he read law at the office of Walbridge & Finch, and was admitted to the bar. Sometime prior to 1854, moved west to Wisconsin, where he was one of the early settlers at the village of Chippewa Falls. At the initial organization of Chippewa County, he was the only lawyer present at the first session of the court, in January 1854, and was appointed the first district attorney of the county.

He soon relocated to Hudson, Wisconsin, where he established a legal practice. In 1860, he was appointed County Judge of St. Croix County, to fill the vacancy caused by the resignation of Judge E. A. Clapp, he was subsequently elected to a full four-year term in the Spring of 1861. He resigned, however, after less than a year in office when he was elected to the Wisconsin State Senate that fall. He served in the Senate for the 1862 and 1863 sessions. At the Republican State Convention in 1863, his name was placed in nomination for the office of Lieutenant Governor of Wisconsin, but he came in a distant third place as the convention chose Wyman Spooner for that office. In 1865, he was elected Mayor of Hudson, and served one year.

In the 1866 Spring election, Humphrey defeated incumbent Wisconsin circuit court judge Lucien P. Wetherby for his seat in the 8th judicial circuit. He was subsequently re-elected to a second six-year term in 1872.

At the 1876 Republican Convention in Wisconsin's 7th congressional district, Humphrey's name was placed in nomination against incumbent Congressman Jeremiah McLain Rusk. Gilbert E. Porter of Eau Claire was also seeking the nomination. After ten ballots with none of the three capable of achieving a majority, Porter and Rusk withdrew, and Humphrey was unanimously nominated. Humphrey went on to win election to the Forty-fifth, Forty-sixth, and Forty-seventh Congresses (March 4, 1877 – March 3, 1883). Following the 1880 census and reapportionment, Wisconsin gained an 8th congressional seat, and Humphrey was placed in the new district. His bid for nomination for another term was defeated at the district convention by William T. Price, who was heavily favored by the Temperance faction.

He resumed his legal practice in Hudson. He served one final term in government, representing St. Croix County in the Wisconsin State Assembly for the 1887–1888 session.

He died in Hudson, Wisconsin, June 10, 1902, and was interred in Willow River Cemetery.

== Family and legacy ==
His former home, now known as the Herman L. Humphrey House, is listed on the National Register of Historic Places.

Wisconsin State Assembly
Preceded by Thomas Porter	Member of the Wisconsin State Assembly from the St. Croix district January 3, 1887 – January 7, 1889	Succeeded by Edward Conner
Wisconsin Senate
Preceded by Charles B. Cox	Member of the Wisconsin Senate from the 28th district January 6, 1862 – January 4, 1864	Succeeded by Austin H. Young
U.S. House of Representatives
Preceded by Jeremiah Rusk	Member of the U.S. House of Representatives from Wisconsin's 7th congressional district March 4, 1877 - March 3, 1883	Succeeded by Gilbert M. Woodward
Legal offices
Preceded by Lucien P. Wetherby	Wisconsin Circuit Court Judge for the 8th Circuit; January 1, 1867 – March 4, 1877	Succeeded by Egbert B. Bundy
