= Edwin F. Townsend =

US Army brigadier general (1833–1909)

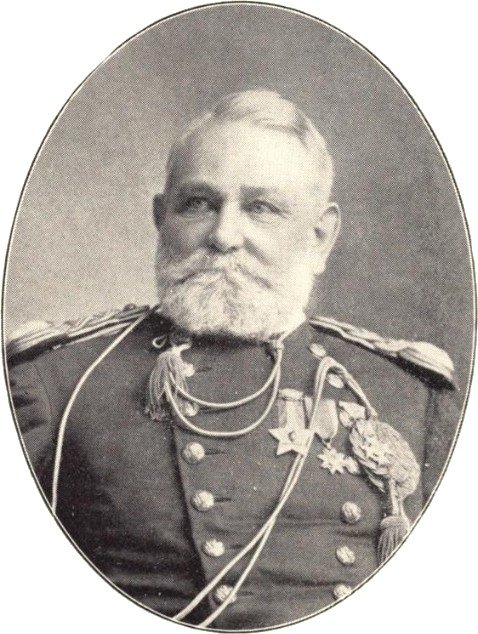
- From 1901's Companions of the Military Order of the Loyal Legion of the United States
- Born: July 14, 1833; Manhattan, New York, US
- Died: August 15, 1909 (aged 76); Washington, D.C., US
- Burial place: Arlington National Cemetery
- Education: United States Military Academy
- Spouse(s): Mary Jane Wadhams (m. 1858; death 1893) Katherine Claire Durant (m. 1899; death 1909)
- Children: 2
- Military career
- Allegiance: United States; Union (American Civil War); Wisconsin
- Service: United States Army; Union Army; Wisconsin Militia
- Service years: 1854–1856, 1866–1895 (US Army); 1861–1866 (Union Army); 1856–1861 (Wisconsin Militia)
- Rank: Brigadier General
- Unit: US Army Infantry Branch
- Commands: Company B, 16th Infantry Regiment; Ordnance Depot, Nashville, Tennessee; 25th Infantry Regiment; Military District of Memphis, Tennessee; Fort Sedgwick; Omaha Barracks; 9th Infantry Regiment; 11th Infantry Regiment; Fort Sully; Fort Buford; Recruiting Depot, Columbus Barracks; Fort Abraham Lincoln; 12th Infantry Regiment; Madison Barracks; Fort Yates; Fort Leavenworth; Infantry and Cavalry School; Fort Niobrara
- Wars: American Civil War; American Indian Wars

Edwin Franklin Townsend (14 July 1833 – 15 August 1909) was a career officer in the United States Army. A veteran of the American Civil War and American Indian Wars, he served from 1854 to 1895 and attained the rank of brigadier general. Townsend commanded four Infantry regiments and numerous military posts over the course of his career, and was commandant of the United States Infantry and Cavalry School (now the United States Army Command and General Staff College) from 1890 to 1894.

Townsend was a native of New York City, and he was raised and educated in Milwaukee. In 1850, he was appointed to the United States Military Academy, from which he graduated in 1854. Assigned to the 3rd Artillery Regiment, he served in California until resigning in 1856. Townsend resided in Milwaukee from 1856 to 1861, where he studied law, attained admission to the bar, and practiced as an attorney. During his years in Milwaukee, Townsend served in the Wisconsin Militia, including assignments as adjutant of 1st Regiment, 1st Brigade and commander of Company B, 1st Regiment, 1st Brigade.

In 1861, Townsend joined the Union Army for the American Civil War. Commissioned as a captain in the 16th Infantry Regiment, he commanded the regiment's Company B as well as ad hoc battalions In Tennessee and Alabama throughout the war and received brevet promotions to major and lieutenant colonel in recognition of his commendable wartime service. He remained with the regular army after the war and took part in Reconstruction era duty at locations in Tennessee and Kentucky.

As Townsend advanced through the ranks, he commanded regiments and forts in the western United States during the American Indian Wars, including Nebraska, Wyoming, Dakota Territory, and Montana. From 1890 to 1894 he was commandant of the Infantry and Cavalry School (now the United States Army Command and General Staff College). In 1894 and 1895, he commanded the 12th Infantry Regiment and Fort Niobrara, Nebraska. In October 1895, Townsend requested retirement for disability, which was approved. In April 1904, Congress enacted legislation promoting Civil War veterans who had not attained general officer's rank by one grade if they had been wounded in the war or had served over 40 years. Under these criteria, Townsend was advanced to brigadier general on the army's retired list.

In retirement, Townsend resided in Washington, D.C. He died in Washington on 15 August 1909. Townsend was buried at Arlington National Cemetery.

== Early life ==
Edwin Franklin Townsend (Sometimes E. F. Townsend or E. Franklin Townsend) was born in Manhattan on 14 July 1833, a son of Edwin Townsend (1803–1870) and Ann Eliza (Graff) Townsend (1809–1892). He was raised and educated in Milwaukee, and in 1850 he received an appointment to the United States Military Academy (West Point). Townsend graduated in 1854 ranked 28th of 46. Among his classmates who became prominent in the American Civil War and the following three decades were George Washington Custis Lee, Henry Larcom Abbot, Thomas H. Ruger, Oliver Otis Howard, James Deshler, Henry W. Closson, John Pegram, J. E. B. Stuart, Archibald Gracie III, Michael Ryan Morgan, Stephen D. Lee, William Dorsey Pender, John Trout Greble, John Bordenave Villepigue, Oliver Duff Greene, Stephen H. Weed, Alfred B. Chapman, Benjamin Franklin Davis, Charles G. Sawtelle, Zenas R. Bliss, and Horace Randal.

At graduation in July 1854, Townsend received an appointment as second lieutenant by brevet and was posted to San Diego, California. In 1855, he was a member of the party that escorted Second Lieutenant John G. Parke's topographical survey expedition as it mapped the Mojave River. Townsend received his commission as a second lieutenant in January 1855. Assigned to the 3rd Artillery Regiment, he was posted to Fort Yuma, where he remained until resigning his commission and leaving the army in March 1856.

From 1856 to 1858, Townsend studied law with a Milwaukee attorney. In 1858, he was admitted to the bar, and he practiced in Milwaukee until 1861. He also joined the Wisconsin Militia and was commissioned as a captain. He served as adjutant of 1st Regiment, 1st Brigade before being appointed to command Company B, 1st Regiment, 1st Brigade.

=== Family ===
In September 1858, Townsend married Mary Jane Wadhams. They were married until her death in 1893 and were the parents of daughters Mary Abernethy Townsend and Lucy Wadhams Townsend. In April 1899, Townsend married Katherine Claire Durant and they remained married until his death.

== Early career ==
In May 1861, Townsend joined the Union Army for the American Civil War and was commissioned as a first lieutenant and promoted to captain in the 16th Infantry Regiment. Assigned to command of the regiment's Company B, he was frequently assigned to command of multiple companies as ad hoc battalions, and he served throughout Tennessee and Alabama during the war. Engagements and battles in which Townsend participated included the Battle of Shiloh and Siege of Corinth. He took part in troop movements through Mississippi, Alabama, and Tennessee in April and May 1862, and commanded the Nashville, Tennessee Ordnance depot from August 1862 to July 1865. Townsend received brevet promotion to major in April 1862 to recognize his commendable service at Shiloh, and lieutenant colonel in March 1865 in recognition of his achievements while in command of Nashville depot.

From July 1865 to April 1866, Townsend commanded 12 companies of the 16th Infantry as they performed post-war Reconstruction duty in Nashville. He performed temporary recruiting duty from April to September 1866, then commanded Company B, 16th Infantry in Nashville until March 1867, when they moved to Paducah, Kentucky. From May to August 1868, he commanded the 25th Infantry Regiment and the Military District of Memphis, Tennessee, and he was promoted to major of the 27th Infantry in June 1868. After an extended leave of absence from August to December 1868, he joined his regiment at Omaha Barracks, Nebraska. He was transferred to the 9th Infantry Regiment at Fort Sedgwick, Colorado in March 1869 and commanded the post and several companies organized as a battalion from March until June. He remained at Fort Sedgwick until September 1870, when he returned to Omaha Barracks as commander of the post and an ad hoc battalion of the 9th Infantry. He was on duty at Camp Stambaugh, Wyoming from June to September 1871, when he returned to Omaha Barracks.

== Continued career ==
Townsend was on disbursing duty in Vicksburg, Mississippi from September 1872 to April 1873. From May to October 1873, he served in the Yellowstone Expedition as commander of a battalion made up of companies from the 8th and 9th Infantry Regiments. From October 1873 to March 1874, he again served at Omaha Barracks. He was on duty at the Spotted Tail Agency in Dakota Territory and at Camp Sheridan, Nebraska from September 1874 to February 1875. He was then posted Fort Laramie, Wyoming, where he served until November 1876, including commanding the 9th Infantry from May to November 1876. Townsend served in the Great Sioux War from November 1876 to January 1877, and was again assigned to Omaha Barracks, this time from January 1877 to June 1879. He was promoted to lieutenant colonel of the 12th Infantry Regiment in March 1879.

After a leave of absence from July to October 1879, Townsend was assigned to Fort Custer, Montana, where he remained until April 1880. He was then ordered to Fort Buford, Dakota Territory, where he served in May. After another leave of absence, this time from May to July 1880, he was assigned to serve on courts-martial at Fort Keogh, Montana and Fort Randall, Dakota Territory. Townsend commanded the 12th Infantry and the post at Fort Sully, South Dakota until April 1881, when he carried out court-martial duties at Fort Custer, Montana and in Missoula, Montana. He then resumed command of his regiment and the post at Fort Sully, where he served until August 1882.

== Later career ==
Townsend commanded Fort Buford from August 1882 to April 1883. From April 1883 to October 1884, he was in charge of the recruiting depot at Columbus Barracks, Ohio. He was then assigned to command Fort Abraham Lincoln, North Dakota, where he served until December 1886. He was promoted to colonel in October 1886. Townsend commanded the 12th Infantry and Madison Barracks, New York until July 1887, and was in command at Fort Yates, North Dakota until December 1888. He served on courts-martial in Washington, D.C. from March to April 1889, when he returned to Fort Yates.

From August 1890 to October 1894, Townsend was commandant of the Infantry and Cavalry School (now the United States Army Command and General Staff College) and commander of the post at Fort Leavenworth, Kansas. From October 1894 to June 1895, he commanded the 12th Infantry and the post at Fort Niobrara, Nebraska. He was on a leave of absence from June through September 1895, when declining health led him to request retirement even though he had not reached the mandatory retirement age of 64. His request was approved, and he left the army with the rank of colonel on 1 October 1895. In retirement, Townsend was a resident of Washington, D.C. In April 1904, the U.S. Congress passed a law to recognize Union Army veterans who had continued to serve after the Civil War. Officers of the regular army who had not become general officers and had either served for more than 40 years or were wounded during the war were eligible to be advanced one grade. Under these criteria, Townsend qualified for advancement to brigadier general, and he was promoted on the retired list, to date from 23 April 1904.

Townsend died in Washington on 15 August 1909. His funeral services took place at his home on Kalorama Road. Members of the Military Order of the Loyal Legion of the United States served as honorary pallbearers, as did four currently serving army officers, including Julius Penn and Peter Charles Harris. He was buried at Arlington National Cemetery.

== Dates of rank ==
Townsend's dates of rank were:

- Second Lieutenant (Brevet), 1 July 1854
- Second Lieutenant, 31 January 1855
- Captain (Militia), 16 February 1857
- First Lieutenant, 14 May 1861
- Captain, 14 May 1861
- Major (Brevet), 7 April 1862
- Lieutenant Colonel (Brevet), 13 March 1865
- Major, 22 June 1868
- Lieutenant Colonel, 20 March 1879
- Colonel, 13 October 1886
- Colonel (Retired), 1 October 1895
- Brigadier General (Retired), 23 April 1904
