= Marcus Fulton =

19th century American politician

Marcus A. Fulton

17th Mayor of Hudson, Wisconsin
- In office April 1877 – April 1878
- Preceded by: David C. Fulton
- Succeeded by: Samuel Hyslop

Member of the Wisconsin Senate from the 28th district
- In office January 1, 1866 – January 6, 1868
- Preceded by: Austin H. Young
- Succeeded by: William J. Copp

Member of the Wisconsin State Assembly
- In office January 6, 1868 – January 4, 1869
- Preceded by: H. L. Wadsworth
- Succeeded by: Charles D. Parker
- Constituency: St. Croix district
- In office January 2, 1865 – January 1, 1866
- Preceded by: Joseph S. Elwell
- Succeeded by: William J. Copp
- Constituency: Pierce–St. Croix district

Personal details
- Born: March 9, 1836 Bethel, New York, U.S.
- Died: August 4, 1892 (aged 56) Hudson, Wisconsin, U.S.
- Cause of death: Stroke
- Resting place: Willow River Cemetery, Hudson, Wisconsin
- Party: Democratic (after 1874); Liberal Republican (1870s); Republican (1865–1871); Natl. Union (1862–1865)
- Spouses: Mercy Augusta Ansley (m. 1863; died 1876); Adelia Frances Ansley (m. 1877–1892)
- Children: with Mercy Ansley; James Fulton^{(b. 1864; died 1865)}; Anna F. (Smith)^{(b. 1865; died 1939)}; Mary Elizabeth Fulton^{(b. 1869; died 1874)}; Olive May (Haven)^{(b. 1874; died 1940)}; two others; with Adelia Ansley; Hiram Ansley Fulton^{(b. 1877; died 1932)}; Blanche Fulton^{(b. 1879; died 1938)}; John Clements Fulton^{(b. 1881; died 1910)}; David Langdon Fulton^{(b. 1883; died 1918)}
- Relatives: David C. Fulton (brother)

Marcus Alexander Fulton (March 9, 1836 – August 4, 1892) was an American businessman, politician, and Wisconsin pioneer. He was the 17th mayor of Hudson, Wisconsin, (1878) and represented northwest Wisconsin in the State Senate (1866, 1867) and Assembly (1865, 1868).

== Early life ==
Fulton was born in Bethel, New York, in March 1836. (Note: One source gives his birth year as 1826, but the overwhelming majority agree on 1836.) In 1854, he moved to Hudson, Wisconsin, with his parents and siblings.

== Career ==
In Hudson, their father became a pioneer merchant in the northwest, but died just four years after their arrival, in 1858. Fulton and his brother, David, inherited the business and operated it successfully, moving from general merchandise into real estate dealing.

Fulton also became involved in politics; in 1864, he was elected to the Wisconsin State Assembly running on the National Union Party ticket. He represented a district comprising all of Pierce and St. Croix counties. Rather than running for re-election, he ran for Wisconsin State Senate in 1865 and won election in the 28th Senate district, running as a Republican. At the end of his two year term in the Senate, he won another term in the Assembly. He ultimately served in the 18th, 19th, 20th, and 21st legislative terms.

After his terms in the Legislature, Fulton became associated with the Liberal Republican faction of Horace Greeley, and—with his brother—started the True Republican, a Liberal Republican newspaper in Hudson. Fulton soon became a Democrat as the Liberal Republicans merged into that party in the mid 1870s.

In the 1870s, both Fulton brothers served as mayor of Hudson, Wisconsin. David Fulton was elected in 1877, and Marcus was then elected in 1878. He also served on the Hudson board of education and city council.

Later in life he was an advocate for silver coinage, and wrote letters published in newspapers around the country under the pen name "Village Merchant".

== Personal life and family ==
Marcus Fulton was a son of James Fulton. He had at least one younger brother, David C. Fulton, who also represented St. Croix County in the Wisconsin State Assembly, was the 16th mayor of Hudson, Wisconsin, and served as U.S. marshal for western Wisconsin in the 1880s. The Fultons were descended from Scottish emigrants who arrived in America in 1770. Marcus Fulton's grandfather fought in the War of 1812.

Marcus Fulton married Mercy Augusta Ansley on April 9, 1863. They had six children together, though at least one died in infancy. After his first wife's death in 1876, Fulton married her sister, Adelia Frances Ansley, in 1877, and had at least four more children.

Fulton died of a stroke at his home in Hudson on August 4, 1892.

== Notes ==
Wisconsin State Assembly
Preceded by Joseph S. Elwell	Member of the Wisconsin State Assembly from the Pierce–St. Croix district January 2, 1865 – January 1, 1866	Succeeded by William J. Copp
Preceded by H. L. Wadsworth	Member of the Wisconsin State Assembly from the St. Croix district January 6, 1868 – January 4, 1869	Succeeded by Charles D. Parker
Wisconsin Senate
Preceded by Austin H. Young	Member of the Wisconsin Senate from the 28th district January 1, 1866 – January 6, 1868	Succeeded by William J. Copp
Political offices
Preceded by David C. Fulton	Mayor of Hudson, Wisconsin; April 1877 – April 1878	Succeeded by Samuel Hyslop
