= Fort Sully (South Dakota) =

- Old Fort Sully: Hughes County, about 4.5 miles southeast of Pierre, South Dakota Fort Sully II: Sully County, 30 miles farther up, and on the same side of the Missouri, and about 20 miles below the mouth of the Cheyenne River.

Site information
- Controlled by: United States

Site history
- Built: 1863 and 1866
- In use: 1863–1894
- Battles/wars: Indian Wars: Battle of Whitestone Hill; Battle of Killdeer Mountain

Garrison information
- Past commanders: Lt. Col. Edward M. Bartlett, 30th Wisconsin; Major Albert E. House, 6th Iowa Cavalry; Lt. Col. John Pattee, 7th Iowa Cavalry; Colonel David S. Stanley, 22nd Infantry; Captain Robert H. Offley, 1st Infantry companies F and H; Major Henry M. Lazelle, 1st Infantry; Captain Leslie Smith, 1st Infantry; Captain Thomas M. Tolman, 1st Infantry; Major Charles G. Bartlett, 11th Infantry; Lt. Col. Edwin F. Townsend, 11th Infantry; Colonel Richard I. Dodge, 11th Infantry; Major William H. Penrose, 12th Infantry; Major Jesse. A. P. Hampson, 12th Infantry; Major James H. Gageby, 12th Infantry
- Garrison: 30th Wisconsin; 6th Iowa Cavalry; 4th U.S.V.I.; 22nd U.S. Infantry; 1st U.S. Infantry; 11th U.S. Infantry; 12th U.S. Infantry

Fort Sully was one of the main military posts located on the east bank of the Missouri River in central Dakota built for use in the Indian Wars. There were two forts named Sully—old Fort Sully, which was in existence and occupied from 1863 to 1866, and the later, or new Fort Sully, which was established in 1866 and was continuously occupied as a military fort until its abandonment in the fall of 1894.

== Old Fort Sully ==
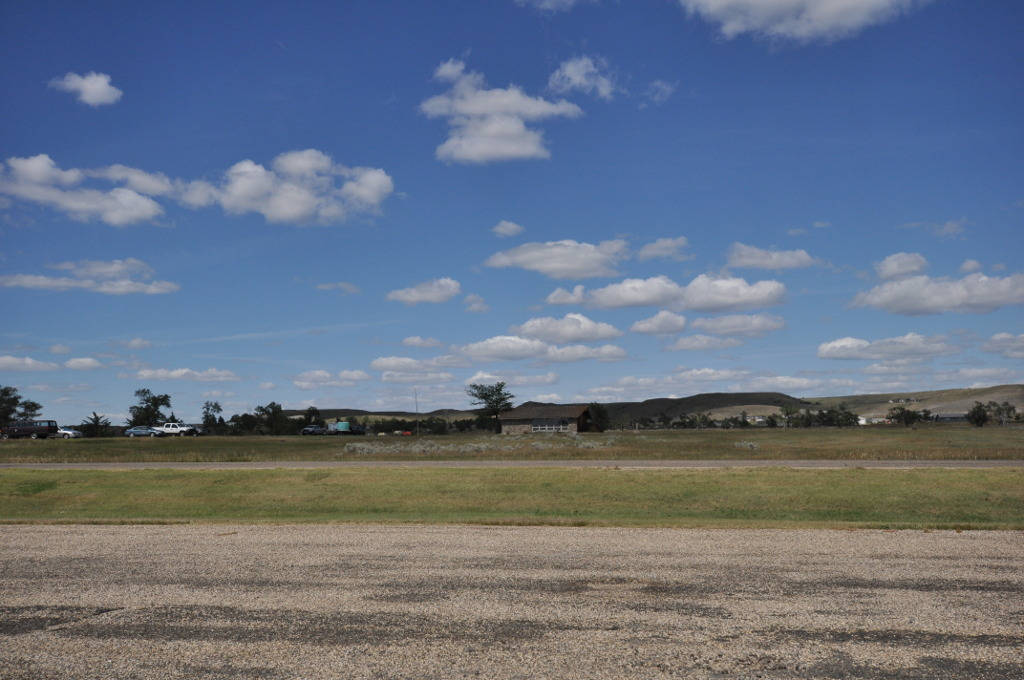
The approximate site of Old Fort Sully in the Farm Island Recreation Area

Old Fort Sully 44°20′46″N 100°16′29″W, in present-day Hughes County, was built by the orders of Major General Alfred Sully in September 1863 and was named for him. It was located about eighty rods from the left (east) bank of the Missouri River, a short distance above the head of Farm Island and about four and one-half miles southeast of what is now the city of Pierre, South Dakota. It was 270 feet (82 m) square and was built of cottonwood timber taken from Farm Island.

A portion of the command of General Sully in the campaigns of 1863-4 and 1865 against the Sioux was garrisoned at old Fort Sully. It was abandoned in the fall of 1866 on account of Its unhealthful location on the lowlands of the Missouri. Today the site is located within the Farm Island State Recreation Area.

=== History ===
On the 13th day of October it was pronounced ready for a company, and its garrison marched in; headquarters and three companies of the Thirtieth Wisconsin; three companies of the Sixth and three of the Seventh Iowa Cavalry, all under the command of Lieutenant Colonel E. M. Bartlett of the Thirtieth Wisconsin, who, in his order assuming the command, announces that the post is to be known as Fort Sully, "in compliment to our brave commander, Brigadier General Alfred Sully, U. S. Volunteers, now commanding the District of Iowa and Dakota."

Company K., 6th Iowa cavalry, under Captain John Logan spent the ensuing winter at Fort Sully, Dakota territory, and accompanied the command under Gen. Sully, to the Devil's Lake region, in July and August.

Troops in the Department of the Northwest, Maj.-Gen. John Pope, U. S. Army, Commanding, District of Iowa, Northwestern Indian Expedition under Brig.-Gen. Alfred Sully:

30th Wisconsin Volunteer Infantry, Companies D and F
June 30, 1864 (Farm Island, D.T.) Lieut. Col. Edward M. Bartlett.

7th Iowa Cavalry, Companies K, L, and M
Sully's Expedition against hostile Sioux Indians July 25-October 8, 1864. Actions at Tah kah a kuty July 25, 1864. (Cos. K and M, Capt. Bradley Mahana.). Two Hills, Bad Lands, Little Missouri River, August 8, 1864 (Cos. K and M).

Company G, 6th Iowa Cavalry
September 1, 1864

30th Wisconsin Volunteer Infantry, Company D
October 1, 1864, Captain David C. Fulton

6th Iowa Cavalry (three companies)
February 28, 1865 to April 30, 1865, Fort Sully, D.T., Maj. Albert E. House.

Companies E and F, 4th U.S. Volunteer Infantry
June 19, 1865 to June 4, 1866, Lt. Col. John Pattee, 7th Iowa Cavalry

==== Treaty of Fort Sully ====
Treaty between, the United States of America and the Yanktonai Band of Dakota or Sioux Indians. Concluded at Fort Sully, October 20, 1865.

Art. I. The Yanktonai band of Dakota or Sioux Indians, represented in council, hereby acknowledge themselves to be subject to the exclusive jurisdiction and authority of The United States, and hereby obligate and bind themselves, individually and collectively, not only to cease all hostilities against the persons and property of its citizens, but to use their influence, and, if requisite, physical force, to prevent other bands of Dakota Indians, or other adjacent tribes, from making hostile demonstrations against the Government or people of The United States.

In 1866 old Fort Sully was temporarily under the command of the Department of the Platte before being assigned to the Department of Dakota in the new Division of Missouri.

== Fort Sully II ==
The later, or new Fort Sully, Established July 25, 1866. Its-erection was begun in July, 1866, but it was not completed until 1868. The site of the new fort, in present-day Sully County, was much more suitable and healthful than the old Fort Sully, Indeed, it was an ideal spot for a fort for defense. It stood on an elevated plateau about 160 feet (49 m) above a wide and beautiful valley of the Missouri. Its site was also about the same elevation above much of the surrounding prairie. This Fort Sully was for many years one of the main military forts in Dakota.

=== Location ===
Fort Sully was situated on the east bank of the Missouri River, twenty miles (32 km) below the mouth of Cheyenne River; at an elevation above the sea of about 2,000 feet (610 m). The nearest town is Yancton, 300 miles (480 km) below by river. The nearest posts are Fort Randall, 200 miles (320 km) below, and Fort Rice, about the same distance above. The post was about halfway between the head of navigation (Fort Benton) and the mouth of the Missouri, and is 1,480 miles (2,380 km) above St. Louis. It is built on the "third terrace," a level plateau, 160 feet (49 m) above low-water mark, and about the same distance below the summit level proper. On the south the surface slopes rapidly into a deep ravine, dry, except in early spring. On the west the descent is abrupt to the second terrace, a strip one hundred yards wide, on which are the stables, granary, saw-mill, smithy, interpreter's house, tavern, etc. Still further below was the river bottom, of varying width, frequently subject to overflow, moderately well timbered and very fertile. Here the company and hospital gardens are situated.

On the left bank of the Missouri river. Postoffice and telegraph station at post. Nearest town, Springfield, Dakota, 220 miles (350 km) distant by wagon road, Yankton, Dakota, (terminus of the Dakota Southern R. R.), distant 262 miles (422 km) by land, and 351 by Missouri river; Sioux City, Iowa, 343 miles (552 km) distant by land. 575 miles (925 km) by Missouri river.

=== Description ===
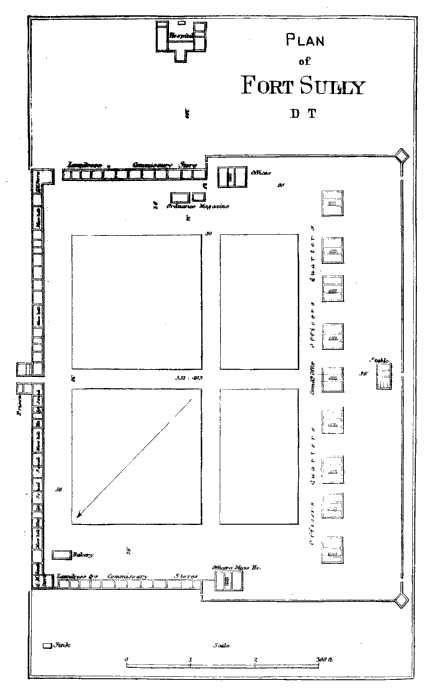
Plan of Fort Sully

The post was intended for four companies. The men's quarters consist of two buildings, each 350 feet (110 m) long by 17 feet (5.2 m) wide, placed end to end, with an interval of 15 feet (4.6 m), which forms the sallyport. They are built of cottonwood logs, covered with pine siding, are lathed and plastered, the ceilings being 12 feet (3.7 m) high. Transverse partitions divide the buildings into dormitories, mess-rooms, kitchens, &c. The squad-rooms measure 20 by 17 feet (5.2 m), are intended for 16 men each, allowing about 255 cubic feet (7.2 m^{3}) air space per man. The experiment was tried for one company of removing the partitions and throwing the small rooms into one, but it was thought that this weakened the building too much. There were no wash or bath-rooms. Ablution must be performed out of doors. It was in contemplation to build a piazza for each building. The dormitories were fitted with rough wooden double bunks in two tiers. The privies, ordinary earth latrines, are 75 yards distant. The ventilation of the barracks were very defective. There were three sets of laundresses' quarters, in a large one-story house similar to the officers' quarters.

For officers' quarters there are nine detached frame buildings, built of pine, on brick foundations, with collars underneath. Each set has a back building of one story, as a kitchen. All the rooms are lathed and plastered. Three of the houses are one and a half stories high, and contain each four rooms, a hall, store-room, and pantry. Two cottages are of one story, while two others, of one and a half stories, are divided each into two sets of quarters of four rooms. None of these quarters have bath-rooms. The guard and prison-rooms are in the ends of the barrack building next the sally-port. The prisoners' room is 15 by 15 feet (4.6 m). The quartermaster's store-houses, two in number, measure 230 by 22 feet (6.7 m) and 120 by 24 feet (7.3 m). The commissary's store-houses, also two in number, measure 228 by 17 feet (5.2 m) and 50 by 22 feet (6.7 m).

The hospital was located near the brink of the ravine, to the south of the post.

=== History ===
==== 22nd Infantry ====
7 years 1866–1873

==== 1st Infantry ====
4 years 1874–1879

==== 11th Infantry ====
9 years 1879–1887

In December, 1878, Company A, Eleventh Infantry, changed station from Fort Bennett (late Cheyenne Agency) to Fort Sully. October 1879 At Fort Sully, D. T., Companies A and K of the Eleventh Infantry.

In December, 1879, the headquarters, band, and Companies G and I, Eleventh Infantry, changed station from Fort Bennett to Fort Sully, D. T.

February 12, 1884, at Fort Sully a fire, originating accidentally in the quarters of Company A, Eleventh Infantry, destroyed the quarters of Company A and the adjoining quarters of the band, Eleventh Infantry, the post guard-house, the store-room, one squad-room, orderly-room, and kitchen of Company E, Eleventh Infantry, and all except one squad-room and the mess-room of Company K, Eleventh Infantry. February 14, Company A was transferred to Fort Bennett, temporarily, for quarters, arriving at the latter post on the same day. Distance traveled, 7 miles (11 km).

==== 12th Infantry ====
12 years 1887–1894

On October 20, 1894, Major Gageby and Companies B, C, and D of the Twelfth Infantry left Fort Sully en route to Fort Niobrara, Nebraska leaving Fort Sully abandoned.

== See also ==
- Department of Dakota § Forts
