= David C. Fulton =

19th century American politician

United States Marshal for the Western District of Wisconsin
- In office June 1886 – July 1, 1890
- President: Grover Cleveland
- Preceded by: J. W. Oakley
- Succeeded by: George C. Ginty

16th Mayor of Hudson, Wisconsin
- In office April 1876 – April 1877
- Preceded by: Philo Q. Boyden
- Succeeded by: Marcus Fulton

Member of the Wisconsin State Assembly from the St. Croix district
- In office January 6, 1873 – January 5, 1874
- Preceded by: John Coit Spooner
- Succeeded by: Harvey Clapp

Personal details
- Born: February 1, 1838 Bethel, New York, U.S.
- Died: March 30, 1899 (aged 61) Chicago, Illinois, U.S.
- Cause of death: Heart disease
- Resting place: Old Willow River Cemetery, Hudson, Wisconsin
- Party: Democratic; Liberal Republican (1870s)
- Relatives: Marcus Fulton (brother)

Military service
- Allegiance: United States
- Branch/service: United States Volunteers; Union Army
- Years of service: 1862–1865
- Rank: Major, USV
- Unit: 30th Reg. Wis. Vol. Infantry; 1st Reg. Wis. Heavy Artillery
- Battles/wars: American Civil War

David Clements Fulton (February 1, 1838 – March 30, 1899) was an American banker and politician. He was the 16th mayor of Hudson, Wisconsin, and represented St. Croix County in the Wisconsin State Assembly during the 1873 session. During the first administration of President Grover Cleveland, he served as United States marshal for the Western District of Wisconsin. He also served as a Union Army officer during the American Civil War.

== Background ==
Fulton was born in Bethel, New York, on February 1, 1838, second son of Mr. and Mrs. James M. Fulton. He received an academic education, and in 1854 accompanied his family when they moved to Hudson, where his father went into the mercantile business on a large scale. His father died March 30, 1858, leaving his business to David and his brother Marcus, who would serve in the Wisconsin State Senate. David described himself in the Wisconsin Blue Book as "engaged in general business" and a "speculator", and mentioned that he dealt in real estate.

== Civil War ==
Fulton raised a company of volunteers for the Union Army from St. Croix County, and in July 1862 was commissioned a captain commanding Company D of the 30th Wisconsin Infantry Regiment. He was on duty with the company as it was assigned to various posts, first in Wisconsin and subsequently to Fort Sully in Dakota Territory, until October 14 of 1864, when Fulton was commissioned as a major of the 1st Wisconsin Heavy Artillery Regiment He was on duty with his new regiment in Virginia through the end of the Civil War. He mustered out June 26, 1865.

== Elected office ==
Fulton held various offices in the government of Hudson, including one term as mayor, member of the St. Croix County Board of Supervisors, member of the school board, and alderman. In 1872 he was elected for a one-year term representing the St. Croix County district of the Assembly as a Liberal Republican, with 1,432 votes to 1,132 for regular Republican B. C. B. Foster (Republican incumbent John C. Spooner was not a candidate). He was assigned to the standing committees on the militia and on engrossed bills

He did not seek re-election in 1874, and was succeeded by Republican Harvey Clapp.

== Later life ==
After his term in the Assembly, Fulton served six years as a manager of the National Homes for Disabled Soldiers, and was a United States Marshal for Western Wisconsin during the first Cleveland administration. He was Cashier and later President of the First National Bank of Hudson, and President of the Board of Trustees of the St. Croix County Asylum; he held the latter two offices at the time of his death.

The Fulton brothers continued the family business together until the 1892 death of Marcus, when the businesses were divided, leaving David to his own personal interests. He died on March 30, 1899, in Chicago, where he had gone to visit his son Marcus.

Wisconsin State Assembly
Preceded by John Coit Spooner	Member of the Wisconsin State Assembly from the St. Croix district January 6, 1873 – January 5, 1874	Succeeded by Harvey Clapp
Political offices
Preceded by Philo Q. Boyden	Mayor of Hudson, Wisconsin; April 1876 – April 1877	Succeeded by Marcus Fulton
Legal offices
Preceded by J. W. Oakley	United States Marshal for the Western District of Wisconsin; June 1886 – July 1, 1890	Succeeded by George C. Ginty
