= Stoddard Judd =

19th century American politician

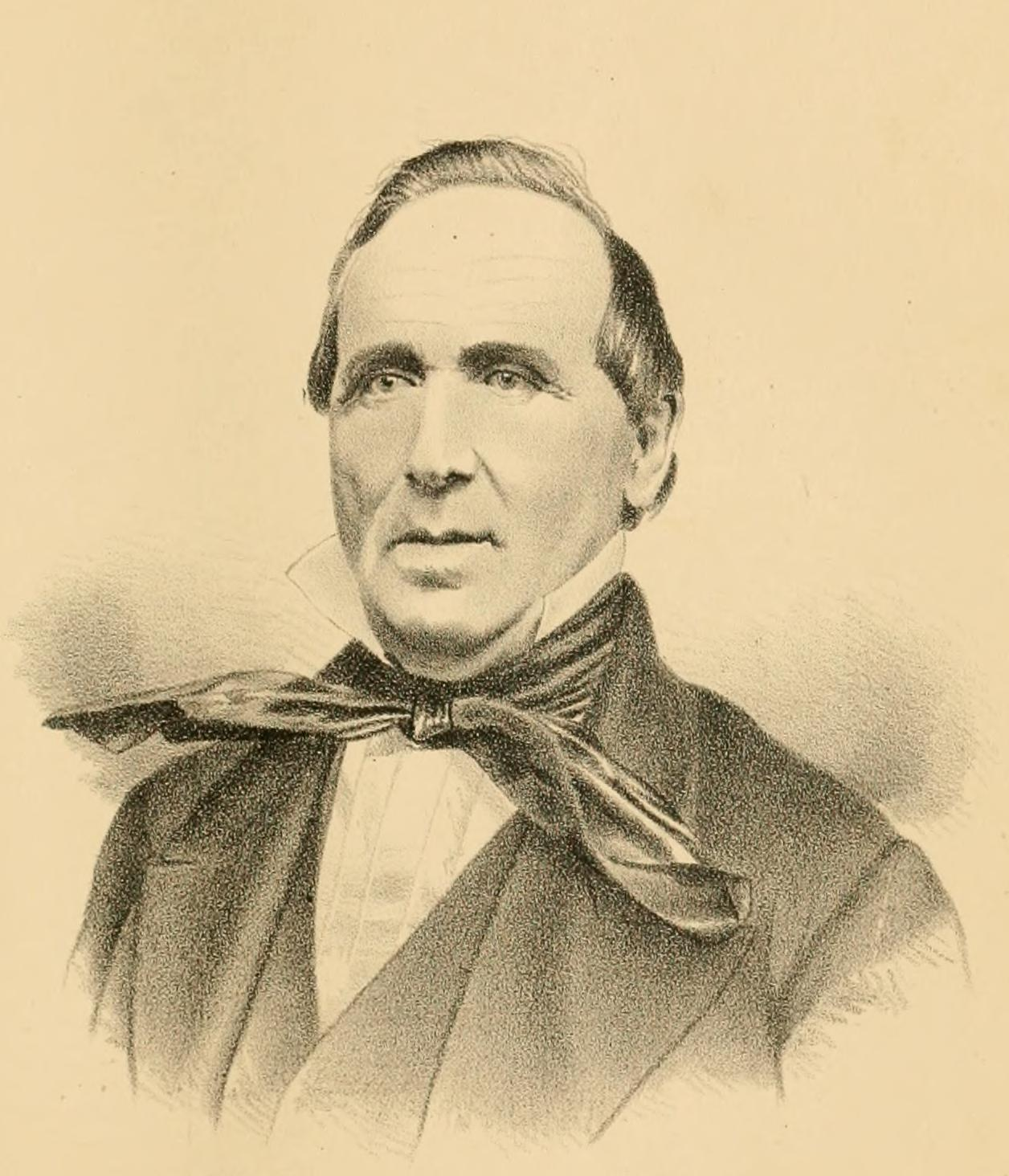

Member of the Wisconsin Senate from the 18th district
- In office January 1, 1866 – January 6, 1868
- Preceded by: William E. Smith
- Succeeded by: Henry W. Lander

Member of the Wisconsin State Assembly
- In office February 20, 1865 – January 1, 1866
- Preceded by: James M. McGuire
- Succeeded by: Oliver Ashley
- Constituency: Dodge 1st district
- In office January 2, 1860 – January 7, 1861
- Preceded by: Cyrus S. Kneeland
- Succeeded by: George W. Bly
- Constituency: Dodge 4th district

Member of the New York State Assembly from Dutchess County
- In office January 1, 1835 – January 1, 1837 Serving with Theodore V. W. Anthony (1835), David Barnes Jr. (1835), Stephen Thorn (1835), Abijah G. Benedict (1836), Cornelius H. Cornell (1836), & Wiliam Eno (1836)
- Preceded by: Theodore V. W. Anthony, William H. Bostwick, Henry Conklin, & James Mabbett
- Succeeded by: Taber Belding, John R. Myer, & David Shelden
- In office January 1, 1829 – January 1, 1830 Serving with Elijah Baker Jr. & Stephen D. Van Wyck
- Preceded by: Taber Belding, Francis A. Livingston, George W. Slocum, & Nathaniel P. Tallmadge
- Succeeded by: James Hughson, George P. Oakley, Jacob Van Ness, & Philo M. Winchell

Personal details
- Born: May 18, 1797 Sharon, Connecticut, U.S.
- Died: March 2, 1873 (aged 75) Fox Lake, Wisconsin, U.S.
- Resting place: Riverside Memorial Park, Fox Lake, Wisconsin
- Party: Republican; Democratic (before 1855)
- Spouse: Elizabeth
- Children: Randall Stoddard Judd^{(b. 1829; died 1912)}; Elizabeth J. (Fisher)^{(b. 1838; died 1899)}
- Education: Albany Medical College
- Profession: physician

Stoddard Judd (May 18, 1797 – March 2, 1873) was an American medical doctor, politician, and Wisconsin pioneer. He served 4 years in the Wisconsin Legislature, representing Dodge County. Earlier, he served three terms in the New York State Assembly.

== Biography ==
Born in Sharon, Connecticut, Judd graduated from Albany Medical College and practiced medicine in Dutchess County, New York. In 1829, 1835, and 1836, Judd served in the New York State Legislature. Then, in 1841, President William Henry Harrison appointed Judd land receiver in Green Bay, Wisconsin Territory. He moved to Fox Lake, Wisconsin in 1845. Judd was also involved in the railroad business, serving as president of the La Crosse Railroad. He served the first and second Wisconsin Constitutional Conventions of 1846 and 1847–1848. Judd was a Democrat, but he backed the Republican candidate, John C. Frémont, in the 1856 election. Judd also served in the Wisconsin State Assembly in 1860 and in the Wisconsin State Senate in 1866 and 1867, at which point he was the oldest member of the senate (at age 69). He died in Fox Lake, Wisconsin on March 2, 1873.

== Notes ==
Wisconsin State Assembly
Preceded by Cyrus S. Kneeland	Member of the Wisconsin State Assembly from the Dodge 4th district January 2, 1860 – January 7, 1861	Succeeded by George W. Bly
Preceded by James M. McGuire	Member of the Wisconsin State Assembly from the Dodge 1st district February 20, 1865 – January 1, 1866	Succeeded by Oliver Ashley
Wisconsin Senate
Preceded by William E. Smith	Member of the Wisconsin Senate from the 18th district January 1, 1866 – January 6, 1868	Succeeded by Henry W. Lander
