= Herman L. Humphrey House =

Historic house in Wisconsin, United States

- U.S. National Register of Historic Places
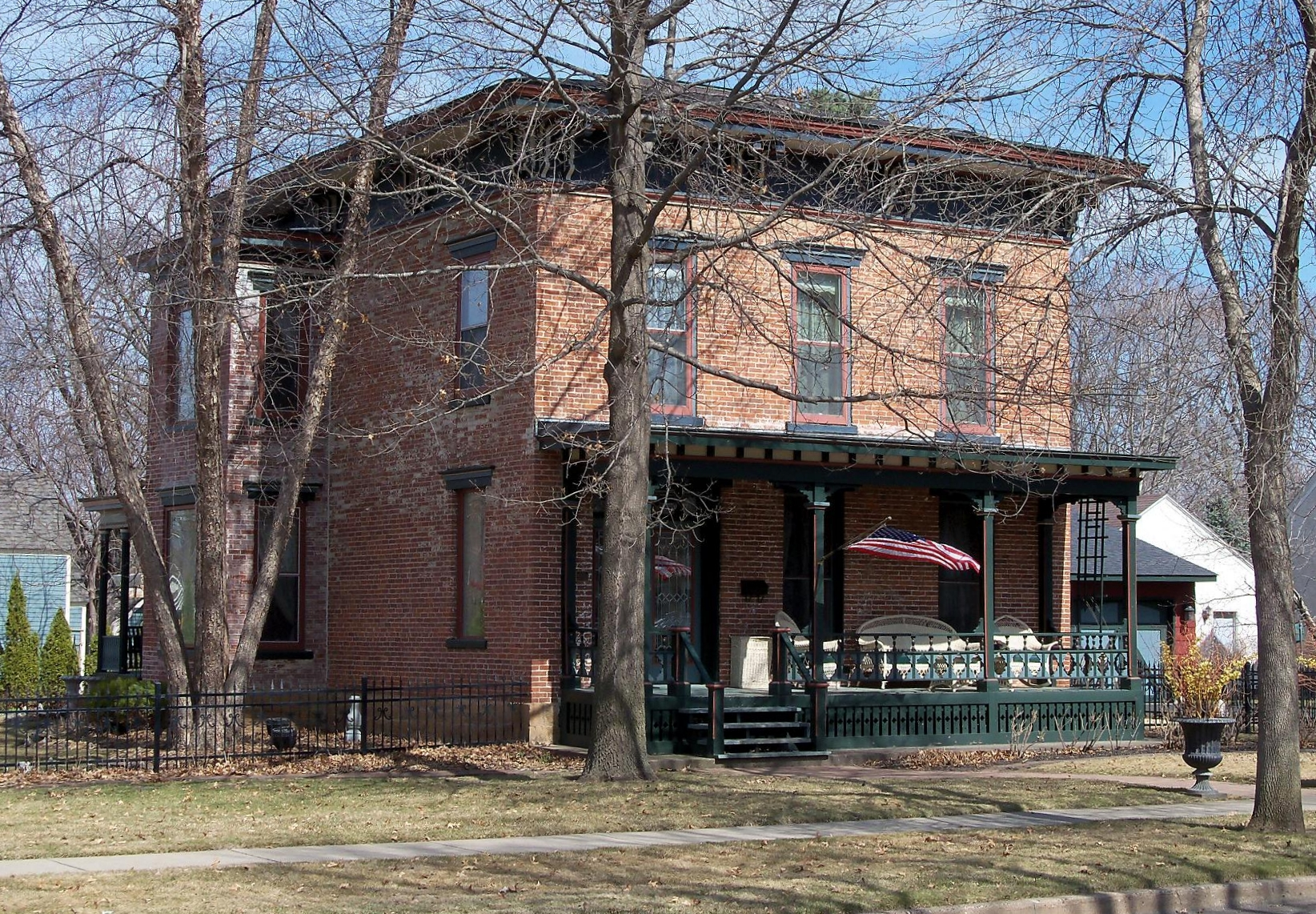
- Herman L. Humphrey House

- Location within Wisconsin Location within the United States
- Location: 803 Orange St. Hudson, Wisconsin
- Coordinates: 44°58′46″N 92°44′51″W
- Area: less than one acre
- Built: c.1860, 1884
- Built by: Alex Gamble (1884 addition)
- Architectural style: Italianate
- MPS: Hudson and North Hudson MRA
- NRHP reference No.: 84000063
- Added to NRHP: October 4, 1984

The Herman L. Humphrey House is located in Hudson, Wisconsin, United States. It was the home of U.S. Representative Herman L. Humphrey. The house was added to the National Register of Historic Places in 1984.

It is a two-story brick Italianate-style house on a stone foundation.
