= Joseph W. Beardsley =

19th century American physician and politician

J. W. Beardsley

14th Speaker of the Wisconsin State Assembly
- In office January 8, 1862 – January 14, 1863
- Preceded by: Amasa Cobb
- Succeeded by: J. Allen Barber

Member of the Wisconsin State Assembly from the Pierce–St. Croix district
- In office January 6, 1862 – January 5, 1863
- Preceded by: District established
- Succeeded by: Charles B. Cox

Personal details
- Born: 1820 Herkimer County, New York, U.S.
- Died: August 27, 1868 (aged 47–48) Ilion, New York, U.S.
- Resting place: St. Luke's Cemetery, Richfield, New York
- Party: Democratic; Natl. Union (1862–1863)
- Spouse: Caroline Maxson (died 1922)
- Children: Amelia Elizabeth Beardsley^{(b. 1848)}; Arthur Maxson Beardsley^{(b. 1849; died 1851)}; Clara (Babbidge)^{(b. 1854; died 1948)}; Frank Warren Beardsley^{(b. 1852; died 1872)}; Anna Cora Beardsley^{(b. 1858)}
- Relatives: Samuel Beardsley (uncle); Levi Beardsley (uncle); Orrin T. Maxson (brother-in-law)

Joseph Warren Beardsley (1820 – August 27, 1868) was an American medical doctor, politician, and Wisconsin pioneer. He served as the 14th speaker of the Wisconsin State Assembly and represented Pierce County. In historical documents, his name is commonly abbreviated J. W. Beardsley. The 1862 Wisconsin legislative manual and later works that relied on that source inaccurately listed his first name as "James".

== Biography ==
Joseph Warren Beardsley was born in Herkimer County, New York, in 1820. He was educated as a medical doctor and came to the Wisconsin Territory about 1845, working as a physician and surgeon in Johnstown, in Rock County.

In the mid-1850s, Beardsley relocated to Pierce County, in northwest Wisconsin, and operated a general store. He became a leading member of the Democratic Party of Wisconsin in that county, and was active in the unsuccessful effort to move the county seat to Prescott, Wisconsin. During the American Civil War, he was elected to the Wisconsin State Assembly as a Union Democrat, and formed a coalition with the Republicans in which he was elected speaker and Republicans received many of the other Assembly offices.

He died at Ilion, New York, in September 1868.

== Personal life and family ==
The Beardsleys are direct descendants of William Beardsley, one of the first settlers at Stratford, Connecticut, who arrived in the country about 1635.

Joseph Warren Beardsley's father, also named Joseph, was the first white child born at Monticello, Otsego County, New York. His uncles, Samuel and Levi Beardsley, were prominent lawyers and politicians in New York, and served in several elected offices.

He married Caroline Maxson and had at least five children.

Wisconsin State Assembly
New district created	Member of the Wisconsin State Assembly from the Pierce–St. Croix district January 6, 1862 – January 5, 1863	Succeeded by Charles B. Cox
Preceded by Amasa Cobb	Speaker of the Wisconsin State Assembly; January 8, 1862 – January 14, 1863	Succeeded by J. Allen Barber
