= Vernon Tichenor =

American politician and lawyer

Vernon Tichenor (August 28, 1815 – January 20, 1892) was an American politician and lawyer.

Born in Amsterdam, New York, Tichenor graduated from Union College in 1838. He then studied law and was admitted to the New York bar in 1838. In 1839, Tichenor opened a law office in Waukesha, Wisconsin Territory. He was involved with the abolitionist movement and the Underground Railroad. During the American Civil War, he was a draft commissioner, He served as the Waukesha town clerk and as president of the village of Waukesha. Tichenor was also court commissioner and served on the school board. In 1869, Tichenor served in the Wisconsin State Assembly. He was on the Carroll University Board of Trustees and was involved with the railroad business. Tichenor died in Waukesha, Wisconsin.
