= Philo Boyden =

American politician (1829–1922)

Philo Quincy Boyden (1829–1922) was an American pharmacist from Hudson, Wisconsin, who served two one-year terms as a member of the Wisconsin State Assembly.

== Background ==
Boyden was born in Washington County, Indiana, on January 4, 1829, the seventh of nine children of David and Rebecca Boyden. His father was a former mason who became a physician. He received a common school education, and became a druggist by trade. He moved from Washington County to Madison County, Indiana, in 1851.

He moved to Hudson, Wisconsin, in 1859, becoming a pioneering druggist of the area. He was one of the thirteen original incorporators and shareholders of the Wisconsin Railway Company organized on June 14, 1863, which would later become part of the Milwaukee and St. Paul Railroad.

== Public office ==
Boyden was elected mayor of the city of Hudson in 1872, without opposition. He was elected to the Assembly's St. Croix County district in 1874 as a member of the Reform Party (a short-lived coalition of Democrats, reform and Liberal Republicans, and Grangers formed in 1873, which secured the election of a governor and a number of state legislators), defeating Republican incumbent Harvey Clapp with 1407 votes to Clapp's 1230. He was assigned to the standing committees on incorporations and on medical societies. He was re-elected in 1875, receiving 1,499 votes against 1,265 for Republican Merton Herrick. He was assigned to the committee on ways and means and remained on the medical societies committee.

He was not a candidate for re-election in 1876, and was succeeded by fellow Reformer Guy Dailey.

== Heritage ==
His Victorian Gothic home, built in 1879, is still standing in Hudson.
