= Michael Ryan Morgan =

United States Army general

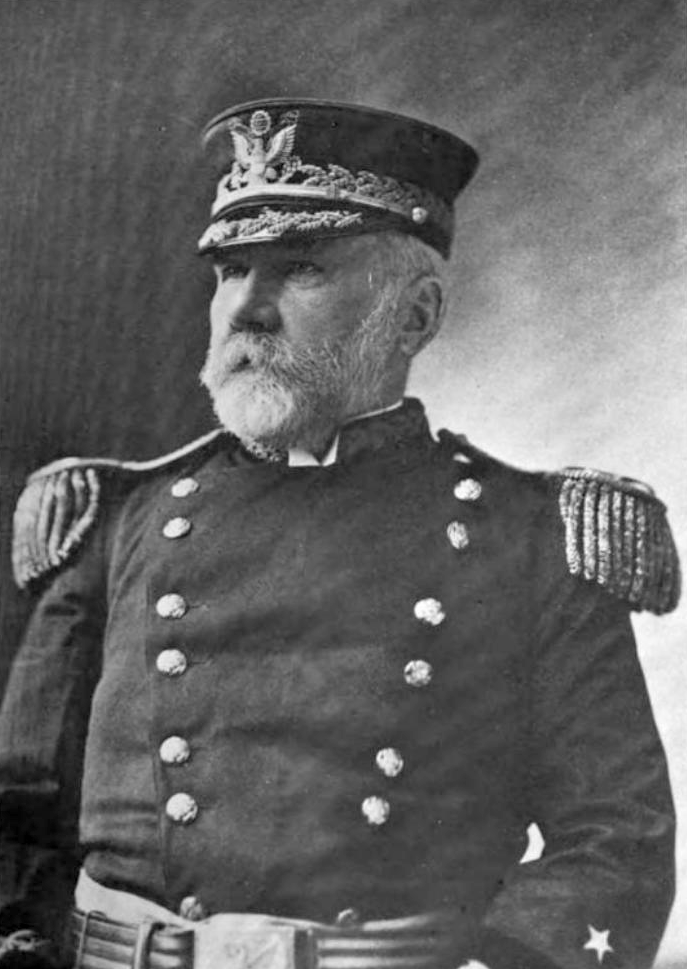
- Born: January 18, 1833; Halifax, Nova Scotia, Canada
- Died: September 16, 1911 (aged 78); Saint Paul, Minnesota, United States
- Occupation: Military officer

Michael Ryan Morgan (January 18, 1833 – September 16, 1911) was a Canadian-American soldier during the American Civil War.

== Biography ==
Morgan was born in Halifax, Nova Scotia on January 18, 1833. He was appointed to the U.S. Military Academy from Louisiana and graduated in 1854. He was assigned to the artillery, and served on garrison duty. He then served against hostile Native Americans until the American Civil War, during which he was in the subsistence department.

He was chief commissary of the X Corps in May and June, 1864, and afterwards of the armies operating against Richmond under Gen. U.S. Grant. Morgan received the brevet to brigadier-general in the regular army for his services in the campaigns of those two years. After the war he stayed in the commissary department with the rank of major, and later served as commissary-general of various departments. He became a full Brigadier General in 1894, and was retired in 1897. He died in Saint Paul, Minnesota on September 16, 1911, and is buried in Calvary Cemetery there.
