= Edward H. Ives =

American politician (1819–1892)

Member of the Wisconsin Senate from the 28th district
- In office January 3, 1870 – January 1, 1872
- Preceded by: William J. Copp
- Succeeded by: Henry L. Eaton

Member of the Wisconsin State Assembly from the Pierce district
- In office January 4, 1869 – January 3, 1870
- Preceded by: Eleazor Holt
- Succeeded by: Oliver S. Powell

Sheriff of Des Moines County, Iowa
- In office January 1851 – January 1854
- Preceded by: Anthony W. Carpenter
- Succeeded by: William Garrett

Personal details
- Born: December 18, 1819 Newton Falls, Ohio, U.S.
- Died: November 18, 1892 (aged 72) Prescott, Wisconsin, U.S.
- Resting place: Pine Glen Cemetery, Prescott, Wisconsin
- Party: Democratic
- Spouse: Mary J. Harris (died 1917)
- Children: John H. Ives^{(b. 1854; died 1902)}; Elizabeth (Zollman)^{(b. 1856; died 1918)}; Helen Mary (Hickok)^{(b. 1859; died 1939)}; Edward Carpenter Ives^{(b. 1872; died 1907)}
- Profession: lawyer, newspaper publisher

Edward H. Ives (December 18, 1819 – November 18, 1892) was an American lawyer, Democratic politician, and pioneer of Iowa and Wisconsin. He was a member of the Wisconsin State Senate and State Assembly, representing Pierce County, and earlier was sheriff of Des Moines County, Iowa.

== Biography ==
Ives was born on December 18, 1819, in Newton Falls, Ohio. He was elected sheriff of Des Moines County, Iowa, in 1850. He moved to Prescott, Wisconsin, in 1858.

In Pierce County, he was the publisher of the Prescott Plaindealer, a Democratic partisan newspaper.

Ives was a member of the Democratic Party and was elected to the Wisconsin State Assembly in 1868, representing all of Pierce County. The following year he was elected to the Wisconsin State Senate, representing Wisconsin's 28th State Senate district, which then comprised eight counties in the northwest of the state.

He died at his home in Prescott on November 18, 1892.

== Personal life and family ==
Edward Ives was the second of nine children born to Eben Ives and his wife Elizabeth (née Hull). His grandfather, Asa Ives, fought in the American Revolutionary War. The Ives were descendants of William Ives, who came to the Massachusetts Bay Colony from England in 1635.

Edward Ives married Mary J. Harris. They had four children. Their eldest son, John, also became a lawyer and public official—he was district attorney of Barron County, Wisconsin, and later served in the Minnesota House of Representatives and the Minnesota Senate.

Wisconsin State Assembly
| Preceded by Eleazor Holt | Member of the Wisconsin State Assembly from the Pierce district January 4, 1869 – January 3, 1870 | Succeeded by Oliver S. Powell |
Wisconsin Senate
| Preceded by William J. Copp | Member of the Wisconsin Senate from the 28th district January 3, 1870 – January 1, 1872 | Succeeded by Henry L. Eaton |
Legal offices
| Preceded by Anthony W. Carpenter | Sheriff of Des Moines County, Iowa; January 1851 – January 1854 | Succeeded by William Garrett |
