= Guy Dailey =

American politician

Guy W. Dailey (July 24, 1827 – January 2, 1899) was a farmer from Hudson, Wisconsin, USA, who was a member of the Wisconsin State Assembly from St. Croix County for a single one-year term.

== Background ==
Dailey was born in Massena, New York, on July 24, 1827. He received a common school education and became a farmer. At some point he migrated to Canada West, and in 1850 moved from there to St. Croix County, settling in the town of Hudson.

== Public office ==
He held various local offices, including chairman of his town, before being elected in 1876 to the Assembly as a member of the Reform Party (a short-lived coalition of Democrats, reform and Liberal Republicans, and Grangers formed in 1873, which secured the election of a governor and a number of state legislators), with 1,860 votes to 1,744 for the Republican G. M. Street. (The incumbent, fellow Reformer Philo Boyden, was not a candidate for re-election.) Dailey was assigned to the standing committee on privileges and elections.

He was not a candidate for re-election in 1877, and was succeeded by the Republican James Hill. (The Reform Party was breaking down, and there was no Reform candidate on the ballot.) In 1879, he tried to unseat Hill for his old seat, running as a Democrat (as the Reform Party had completely disintegrated by then), but Hill polled 1,695 votes to Dailey's 1,595.

== After the legislature ==
He continued to farm, and died (described as "one of the well-known popular pioneer farmers of Hudson prairie") at his home on January 2, 1899, after an illness of several weeks.
