= Henry W. Lander =

American politician

Henry Wilson Lander (November 8, 1826 – January 14, 1904) was an American lawyer and politician.

Born in Brighton, Maine, Lander moved to Juneau, Wisconsin in 1849. In 1852, he then moved to Beaver Dam, Wisconsin where he practiced law. He served as mayor of Beaver Dam. Lander also served in the Wisconsin State Senate in 1868 and 1869. He also served as Dodge County district attorney, United States court commissioner, and Wisconsin Circuit Court commissioner. He died of pneumonia in Beaver Dam, Wisconsin.
