= Baldwin (town), Wisconsin =

Civil town in St. Croix County, Wisconsin

Baldwin, Wisconsin
- Town
- Town of Baldwin
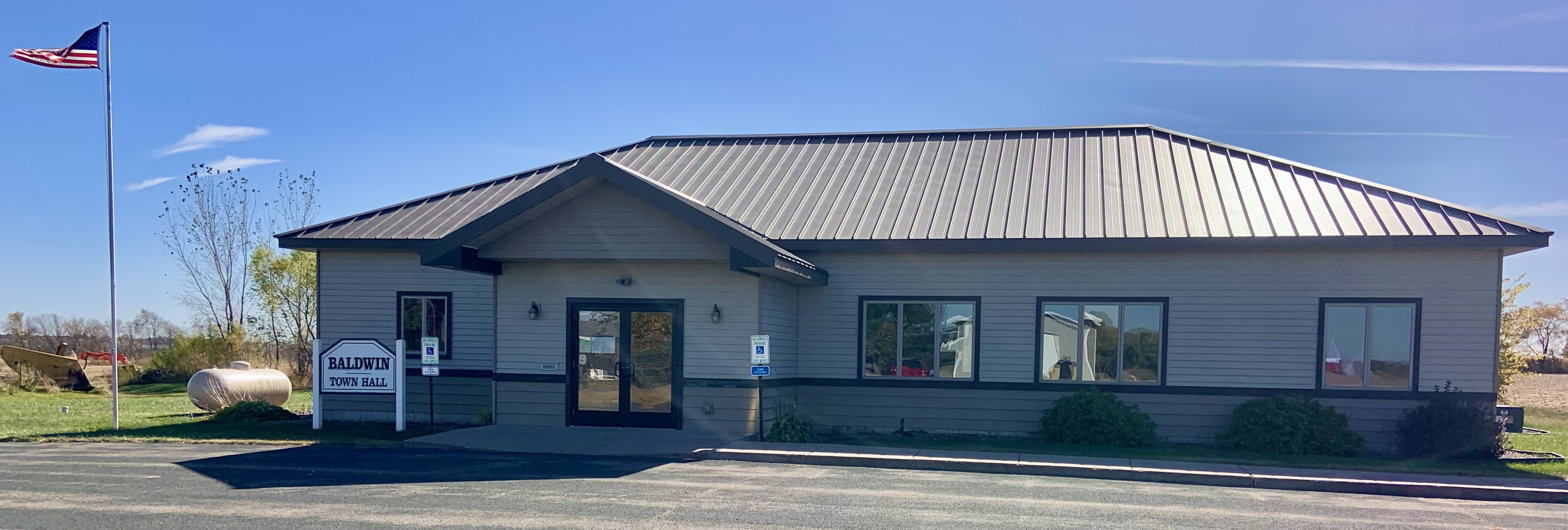
- Baldwin Town Hall

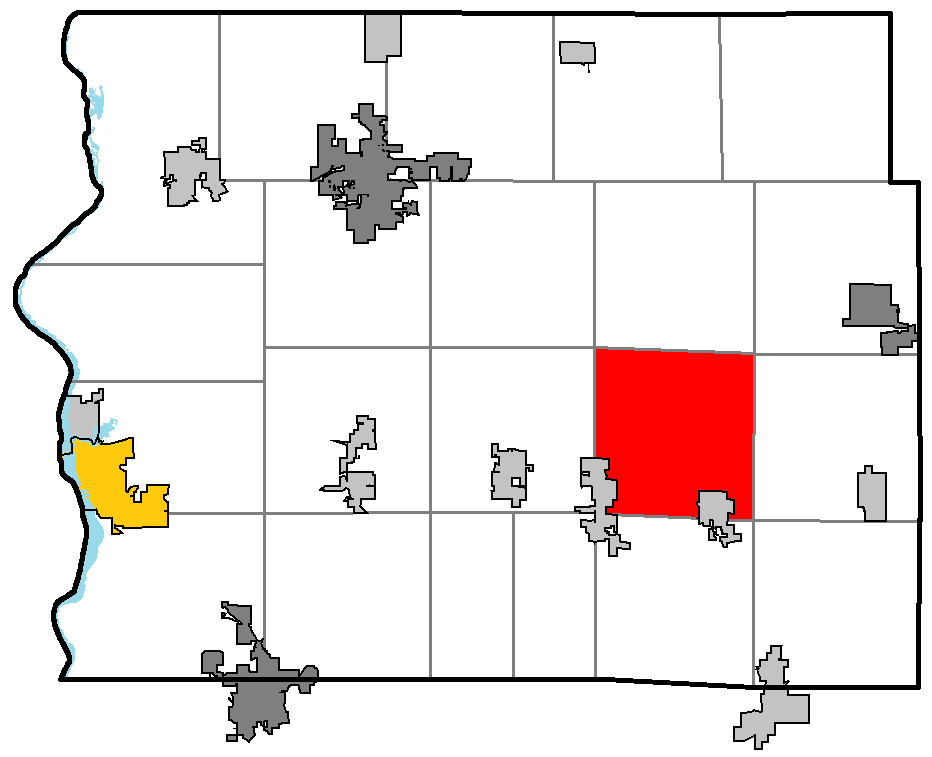
- Location of Baldwin, within St. Croix County

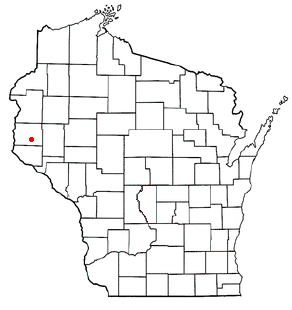
- Location of Baldwin, Wisconsin
- Coordinates: 44°59′54″N 92°18′44″W
- Country: United States
- State: Wisconsin
- County: St. Croix

Area
  - Total: 32.27 sq mi (83.6 km^{2})
  - Land: 32.19 sq mi (83.4 km^{2})
  - Water: 0.07 sq mi (0.18 km^{2})

Population (2020)
  - Total: 1,047
  - Density: 32.53/sq mi (12.56/km^{2})
- Time zone: UTC-6 (Central (CST))
  - Summer (DST): UTC-5 (CDT)
- Area code(s): 715 and 534
- GNIS feature ID: 1582744

Baldwin is a town in St. Croix County, Wisconsin, United States. The population was 1,047 at the 2020 census. The Village of Baldwin is located partially within the town. The unincorporated community of Dahl is also located in the town.

== Geography ==
According to the United States Census Bureau, the town has a total area of 32.2 square miles (83.3 km^{2}), of which 32.1 square miles (83.1 km^{2}) is land and 0.1 square mile (0.2 km^{2}) (0.25%) is water.

== Demographics ==
Historical population
Census	Pop.	Note	%±
2000	903		—
2010	928		2.8%
2020	1,047		12.8%

As of the census of 2000, there were 903 people, 307 households, and 272 families residing in the town. The population density was 28.1 inhabitants per square mile (10.8/km^{2}). There were 315 housing units at an average density of 9.8 per square mile (3.8/km^{2}). The racial makeup of the town was 97.23% White, 0.11% Native American, 1.33% Asian, 0.22% from other races, and 1.11% from two or more races. 1.55% of the population were Hispanic or Latino of any race.

There were 307 households, out of which 40.7% had children under the age of 18 living with them, 78.5% were married couples living together, 6.8% had a female householder with no husband present, and 11.1% were non-families. 8.8% of all households were made up of individuals, and 2.6% had someone living alone who was 65 years of age or older. The average household size was 2.94 and the average family size was 3.12.

In the town, the population was spread out, with 27.0% under the age of 18, 8.2% from 18 to 24, 28.9% from 25 to 44, 26.5% from 45 to 64, and 9.4% who were 65 years of age or older. The median age was 39 years. For every 100 females, there were 96.7 males. For every 100 females age 18 and over, there were 98.5 males.

The median income for a household in the town was $52,188, and the median income for a family was $58,000. Males had a median income of $34,615 versus $24,688 for females. The per capita income for the town was $22,148. About 2.7% of families and 2.9% of the population were below the poverty line, including 1.6% of those under age 18 and 2.7% of those age 65 or over.
