= Leo Mohn =

American farmer, cattle breeder, and electric company foreman

Leo Mohn (June 6, 1925 – July 9, 1980) was an American farmer, cattle breeder, and electric company foreman.

Born in Woodville, Wisconsin, Mohn was a farmer, electric company foreman, and was involved with the breeders and creamery cooperatives. He served on the Woodville School Board and was involved with the Democratic Party. Mohn served in the Wisconsin State Assembly from 1971 to 1979. He died in a hospital in Hayward, Wisconsin after suffering a heart attack while on vacation. He was seeking election at the time of his death after taking out nomination papers.
