= Edward Conner =

American politician

Edward Conner (1829–1900) was a member of the Wisconsin State Assembly.

== Biography ==
Conner was born on February 3, 1829, in Steuben County, New York. He settled in Woodville, Wisconsin, in 1871.

== Career ==
Conner was elected to the Assembly in 1888. Other positions he held include member of the county board of St. Croix County, Wisconsin, from 1880 to 1885. He was a Republican.
