= Pleasant Valley, St. Croix County, Wisconsin =

Pleasant Valley, Wisconsin
- Town
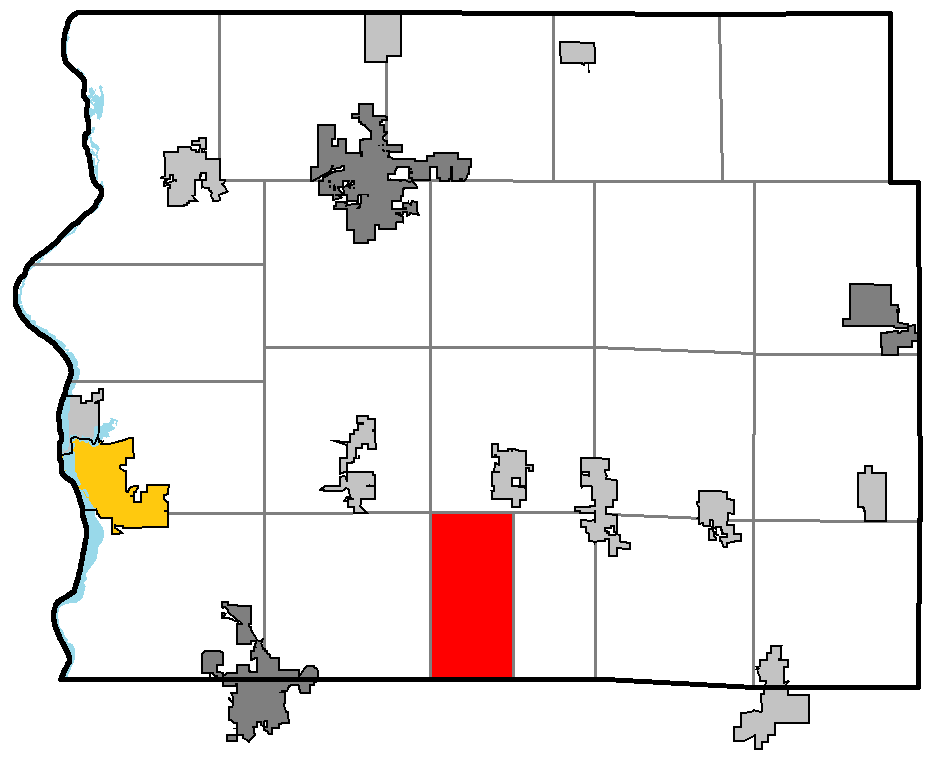
- Location of Pleasant Valley, within St. Croix County

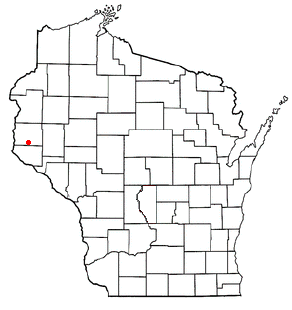
- Location of Pleasant Valley, St. Croix County, Wisconsin
- Coordinates: 44°53′58″N 92°27′48″W
- Country: United States
- State: Wisconsin
- County: St. Croix

Area
  - Total: 18.0 sq mi (46.7 km^{2})
  - Land: 18.0 sq mi (46.7 km^{2})
  - Water: 0 sq mi (0.0 km^{2})
- Elevation: 1,070 ft (326 m)

Population (2020)
  - Total: 567
  - Density: 31.4/sq mi (12.1/km^{2})
- Time zone: UTC-6 (Central (CST))
  - Summer (DST): UTC-5 (CDT)
- Area codes: 715 & 534
- FIPS code: 55-63425
- GNIS feature ID: 1583939
- Website: Town of Pleasant Valley website

Pleasant Valley is a town in St. Croix County, Wisconsin, United States. The population was 567 at the 2020 census.

== Geography ==
According to the United States Census Bureau, the town has a total area of 18.0 square miles (46.7 km^{2}), all land.

== Demographics ==
Historical population
Census	Pop.	Note	%±
2010	515		—
2020	567		10.1%

As of the census of 2000, there were 430 people, 145 households, and 114 families residing in the town. The population density was 23.9 inhabitants per square mile (9.2/km^{2}). There were 150 housing units at an average density of 8.3 per square mile (3.2/km^{2}). The racial makeup of the town was 98.37% White, 0.23% African American, 0.23% Native American, 0.23% Asian, and 0.93% from two or more races. Hispanic or Latino of any race were 0.70% of the population.

There were 145 households, out of which 40.7% had children under the age of 18 living with them, 69.7% were married couples living together, 8.3% had a female householder with no husband present, and 20.7% were non-families. 10.3% of all households were made up of individuals, and 2.1% had someone living alone who was 65 years of age or older. The average household size was 2.97 and the average family size was 3.20.

In the town, the population was spread out, with 31.4% under the age of 18, 7.7% from 18 to 24, 29.8% from 25 to 44, 22.6% from 45 to 64, and 8.6% who were 65 years of age or older. The median age was 34 years. For every 100 females, there were 102.8 males. For every 100 females age 18 and over, there were 102.1 males.

The median income for a household in the town was $58,750, and the median income for a family was $60,750. Males had a median income of $42,083 versus $37,656 for females. The per capita income for the town was $22,074. None of the families and 0.5% of the population were living below the poverty line, including no under eighteens and none of those over 64.
