= Woodville, Wisconsin =

- Village
- Location of Woodville in St. Croix County, Wisconsin

- Location within the state of Wisconsin Location within the United States Woodville (North America)
- Coordinates: 44°56′57″N 92°17′21″W
- Country: United States
- State: Wisconsin
- County: St. Croix

Area
  - Total: 1.80 sq mi (4.65 km^{2})
  - Land: 1.80 sq mi (4.65 km^{2})
  - Water: 0 sq mi (0.00 km^{2})
- Elevation: 1,142 ft (348 m)

Population (2020)
  - Total: 1,386
  - Density: 772/sq mi (298/km^{2})
- Time zone: UTC-6 (Central (CST))
  - Summer (DST): UTC-5 (CDT)
- Area codes: 715 & 534
- FIPS code: 55-89025
- GNIS feature ID: 1581761
- Website: villageofwoodville.org

Woodville is a village in St. Croix County, Wisconsin, United States. The population was 1,386 at the 2020 census.

== History ==
Woodville was first settled in 1870 with ties to the railroad and logging industry.

== Geography ==
According to the United States Census Bureau, the village has a total area of 1.77 square miles (4.58 km^{2}), all land.

Woodville is located along Interstate 94, U.S. Highway 12, and County Roads B, BB, and D.

Woodville is located at 44°56′57″N 92°17′21″W (44.949243, -92.289282).

== Demographics ==
Historical population
Census	Pop.	Note	%±
1920	298		—
1930	403		35.2%
1940	408		1.2%
1950	410		0.5%
1960	430		4.9%
1970	522		21.4%
1980	725		38.9%
1990	942		29.9%
2000	1,104		17.2%
2010	1,344		21.7%
2020	1,386		3.1%
U.S. Decennial Census

=== 2010 census ===
As of the census of 2010, there were 1,344 people, 525 households, and 334 families living in the village. The population density was 759.3 inhabitants per square mile (293.2/km^{2}). There were 566 housing units at an average density of 319.8 per square mile (123.5/km^{2}). The racial makeup of the village was 96.1% White, 0.1% African American, 0.1% Native American, 0.5% Asian, 1.0% from other races, and 2.2% from two or more races. Hispanic or Latino of any race were 2.3% of the population.

There were 525 households, of which 38.7% had children under the age of 18 living with them, 45.7% were married couples living together, 11.8% had a female householder with no husband present, 6.1% had a male householder with no wife present, and 36.4% were non-families. 29.5% of all households were made up of individuals, and 10.3% had someone living alone who was 65 years of age or older. The average household size was 2.49 and the average family size was 3.05.

The median age in the village was 34.2 years. 28.1% of residents were under the age of 18; 7.6% were between the ages of 18 and 24; 30.1% were from 25 to 44; 21% were from 45 to 64; and 13.2% were 65 years of age or older. The gender makeup of the village was 50.3% male and 49.7% female.

=== 2000 census ===
As of the census of 2000, there were 1,104 people, 446 households, and 288 families living in the village. The population density was 870.0 inhabitants per square mile (335.9/km^{2}). There were 460 housing units at an average density of 362.5 per square mile (140.0/km^{2}). The racial makeup of the village was 98.19% White, 0.63% Asian, 0.45% from other races, and 0.72% from two or more races. Hispanic or Latino of any race were 0.72% of the population.

There were 446 households, out of which 35.9% had children under the age of 18 living with them, 50.0% were married couples living together, 8.5% had a female householder with no husband present, and 35.4% were non-families. 30.9% of all households were made up of individuals, and 15.9% had someone living alone who was 65 years of age or older. The average household size was 2.37 and the average family size was 2.97.

In the village, the population was spread out, with 26.6% under the age of 18, 10.0% from 18 to 24, 30.8% from 25 to 44, 15.3% from 45 to 64, and 17.3% who were 65 years of age or older. The median age was 34 years. For every 100 females, there were 95.1 males. For every 100 females age 18 and over, there were 91.9 males.

The median income for a household in the village was $38,828, and the median income for a family was $49,643. Males had a median income of $35,764 versus $25,556 for females. The per capita income for the village was $20,958. About 2.7% of families and 5.8% of the population were below the poverty line, including 4.6% of those under age 18 and 15.8% of those age 65 or over.

== Notable people ==
- Edward Conner, Wisconsin State Representative, lived in Woodville.
- Leo Mohn, Wisconsin State Representative, was born in Woodville.
