= Austin H. Young =

American politician (1830–1905)

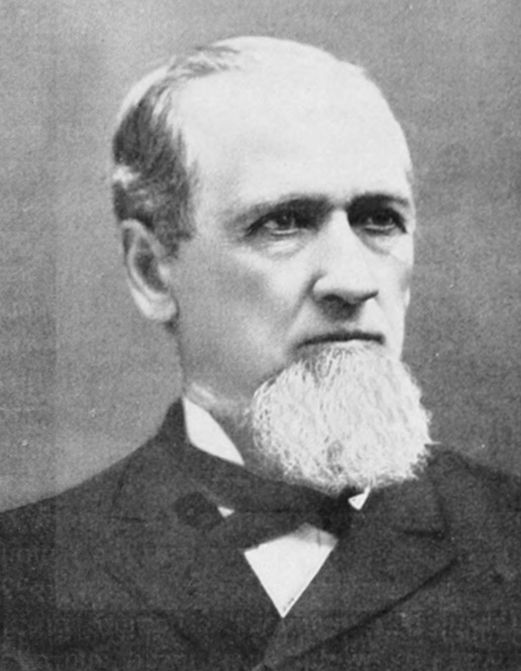

Member of the Wisconsin State Senate
- In office 1864–1865

Personal details
- Born: Austin Hill Young; December 6, 1830 Fredonia, New York
- Died: February 13, 1905 (aged 74) Minneapolis, Minnesota
- Spouses: Martha Martin (m. 1854) Leonore Martin (m. 1872)
- Children: 2
- Occupation: Jurist, politician

Austin Hill Young (December 6, 1830 – February 13, 1905) was an American politician who served as a Wisconsin State Senate member and a Minnesota District Court judge.

He was born in Fredonia, New York, and moved to Prescott, Wisconsin, in 1854 and then to Minneapolis, Minnesota, in 1866.

Young married twice. First, to Martha Martin in 1854. Second, to Leonore Martin in 1872. They had two children.

He died at his home in Minneapolis on February 13, 1905.

== Career ==
Young was a Republican member of the Senate from 1864 to 1865. Previously, he had served as District Attorney of Pierce County, Wisconsin.

In 1871, Young was elected City Attorney of Minneapolis. The following year, he was appointed to judge the Court of Common Pleas. He then became Judge of the Fourth Judicial District from 1877 to 1891.
