= Kinnickinnic River =

Kinnickinnic River may refer to one of two rivers in the U.S. state of Wisconsin:

- Kinnickinnic River (Milwaukee River tributary) in southeastern Wisconsin
- Kinnickinnic River (St. Croix River tributary) in northwestern Wisconsin

== See also ==
- Kinnikinnick (disambiguation)
