= Kinnikinnick (disambiguation) =

Kinnikinnick, kinnikinic, kinnikinick, etc. may refer to:

== Plants ==
- Bearberry (Arctostaphylos spp.), commonly referred to as "kinnikinick"
- Red osier dogwood (Cornus sericea), regionally referred to as "kinnikinick" in Minnesota and Wisconsin
- Silky cornel (Cornus amomum)
- Canadian bunchberry (Cornus canadensis)
- Evergreen sumac (Rhus virens)
- Littleleaf sumac (Rhus microphylla)

== Toponyms ==
- Kinikinik, Colorado, an unincorporated community in Colorado
- Kinikinik Lake, a lake in Alberta
- Kinikinik, Alberta
- Kinnickinnic River (Milwaukee River), a river in eastern Wisconsin, a tributary of the Milwaukee River
- Kinnickinnic River (St. Croix River), a river in western Wisconsin, a tributary of the St. Croix River
- Kinnickinnic, Wisconsin, a town in western Wisconsin named after one of the rivers
- Kinnickinnic State Park, a park in western Wisconsin
- Kinnikinick Lake, a lake in Arizona
- Kinnikinnick Creek, a stream in southern central Ohio
- Kinnikinnick, Ohio, a village in Ohio, named after the stream
- Kinnikinnick Park, a municipal park in the town of Sechelt in western Canada

== Other ==
- Kinnikinnick, a smoking product utilizing either the leaf or inner bark of any of the plants that go by this name, typically mixed with other plant materials, such as tobacco and/or berries.
