= Oliver S. Powell (politician) =

American politician

Oliver Samuel Powell (June 19, 1830 – September 26, 1888) was an American farmer, miller and merchant from River Falls, Wisconsin who spent three consecutive one-year terms as a state legislator.

== Background ==
He was born June 19, 1830, in Madrid, New York, and moved to Augusta, Illinois in 1843. He received a public school education, and became a farmer. In 1849, he came to Stillwater, Minnesota with what was supposedly the first threshing machine north of Prairie du Chien, and threshed the first grain of that fall season.

He came to Wisconsin in 1849, joining his father William and his brothers Nathaniel and Lyman. The brothers claimed adjacent lands, and in 1852 built a sawmill and the first frame building in the area, which was first used as a home, then became a general store known as the "Old Pioneer Store" at the corner of Main and Maple. In 1854 the brothers platted a village first known as Kinnickinnic and sometimes as Greenwood, before finally settling on the name "River Falls" after the falls of the Kinnickinnic River on whose banks it was built.

On September 23, 1860, Powell married L(ydia) Elmira Nichols, a native of Braintree, Vermont. They would have four sons and three daughters. In 1862, Nathaniel died, and Oliver Powell had to take over the store and other family business.

== Public office ==
He was first elected to the Assembly in 1869 as a Republican without opposition, and was assigned to the standing committee on railroads. He was re-elected in 1870, with 902 votes to 413 for Democrat Joel Foster (who had been the first white settler in what was now Pierce County); and was assigned to the committees on privileges and elections; and on swamps and overflowed lands. He was re-elected again in 1871, receiving 1,133 votes against 609 for Thomas Carney, one of five "people's candidates" running in that election, and was assigned to the committee on ways and means.

During his time in the Assembly, he worked with other local figures to achieve the 1874 creation of a new state normal school in River Falls, the nucleus of what would become the University of Wisconsin–River Falls.

== After the Assembly ==
Powell died in his cane mill on September 26, 1888.
