= Matt Bowen (disambiguation) =

Matt Bowen (born 1982) is an Australian former rugby league footballer.

Matt Bowen may refer to:

- Matt Bowen (American football) (born 1976), American football player
- Matt Bowen (musician), American musician
- Matty Bowen (fl. 1921), English rugby league footballer
- Matt Bowen (basketball), American collegiate basketball coach
