= River Falls, Wisconsin =

City in Pierce and St. Croix Counties, Wisconsin

- City
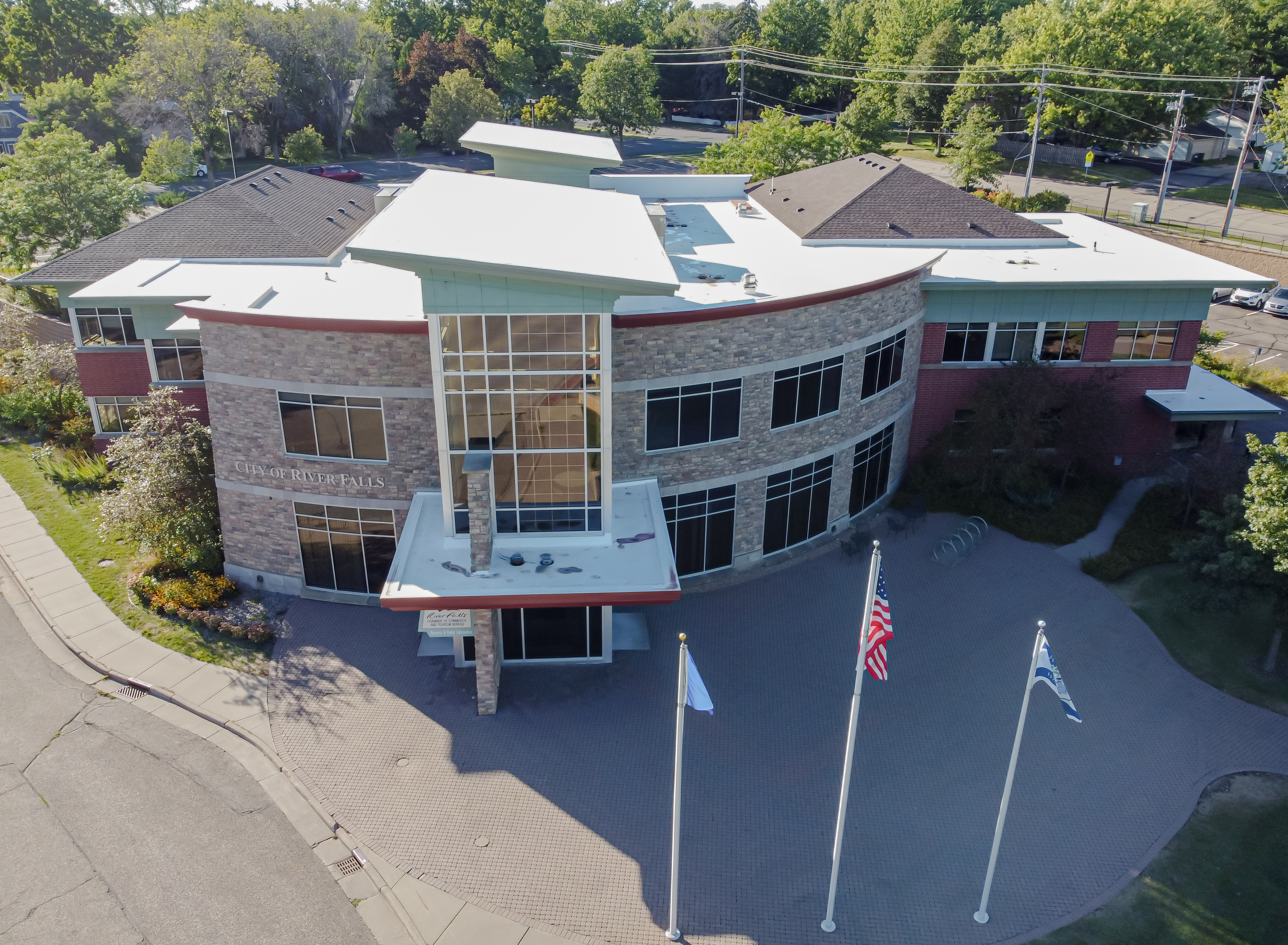
- City hall

- Location of River Falls in Pierce County and St. Croix County, Wisconsin

- Location within Wisconsin Location within the United States
- Coordinates: 44°51′31″N 92°37′30″W
- Country: United States
- State: Wisconsin
- County: Pierce and St. Croix
- Incorporated: 1885

Government
  - Type: Mayor – Council
  - Mayor: Alison Page

Area
  - Total: 7.27 sq mi (18.83 km^{2})
  - Land: 7.19 sq mi (18.61 km^{2})
  - Water: 0.081 sq mi (0.21 km^{2})

Population (2020)
  - Total: 16,182
  - Estimate (2025): 17,916
  - Density: 2,230.1/sq mi (861.05/km^{2})
- Time zone: UTC−6 (Central (CST))
  - Summer (DST): UTC−5 (CDT)
- Area codes: 715 & 534
- FIPS code: 55-68275
- Website: http://www.rfcity.org

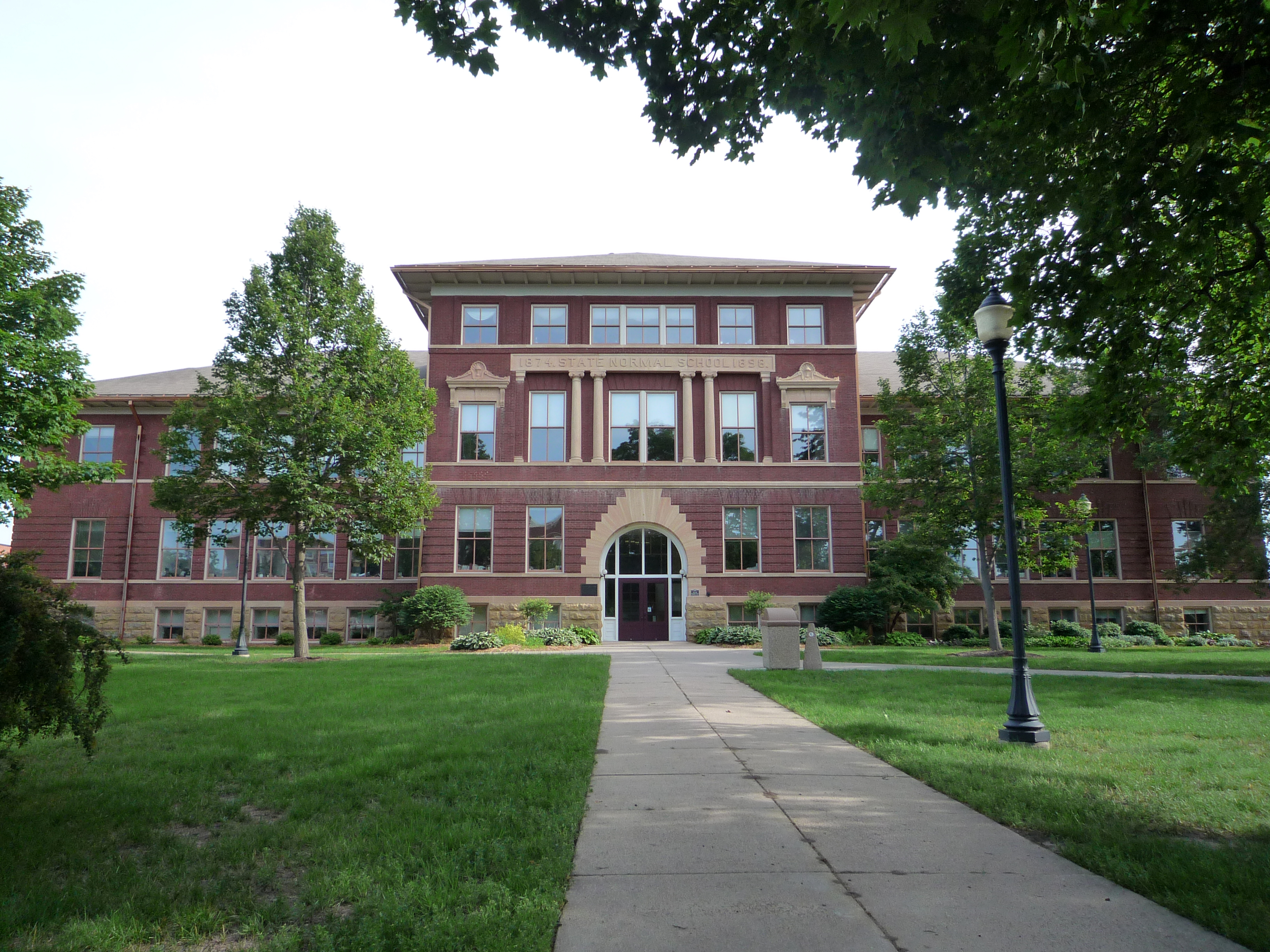
South Hall, on the University of Wisconsin-River Falls campus, is on the National Register of Historic Places.

River Falls is a city in Pierce and St. Croix counties in the U.S. state of Wisconsin. It is mostly within the town of River Falls, and adjacent to the town of Kinnickinnic in St. Croix County. River Falls is the most populous city in Pierce County. The population was 16,182 at the 2020 census, with 12,546 residing in Pierce County and 3,636 in St. Croix County. It is part of the Minneapolis–St. Paul metropolitan area and about 30 miles (48 km) east of the center of that region.

River Falls is the home of the University of Wisconsin–River Falls.

== History ==
The city's first settlers were Joel Foster and his indentured servant, Dick, in 1848. The village was started as Kinnickinnic in 1854 by brothers Nathaniel N. and Oliver S. Powell, who were from St. Lawrence County, New York. At the time, the town and village were also known as Greenwood, but this was changed, as another Greenwood, Wisconsin already existed. The present name comes from the Kinnickinnic River rapids.

On June 23, 1893, a lightning bolt hit the center circus pole at a Ringling Brothers circus performance in River Falls, injuring multiple audience members and performers and killing seven.

== Geography ==
According to the United States Census Bureau, the city has an area of 6.60 square miles (17.09 km^{2}), of which 6.52 square miles (16.89 km^{2}) is land and 0.08 square miles (0.21 km^{2}) is water.

River Falls lies on the banks of the Kinnickinnic River, a class one trout stream. The South Fork of the Kinnickinnic River runs through the city, dividing the University of Wisconsin-River Falls campus into two sections.

River Falls is along Wisconsin Highways 29, 35, and 65. Other routes include Main Street, Cascade Avenue, and Division Street / County Road M.

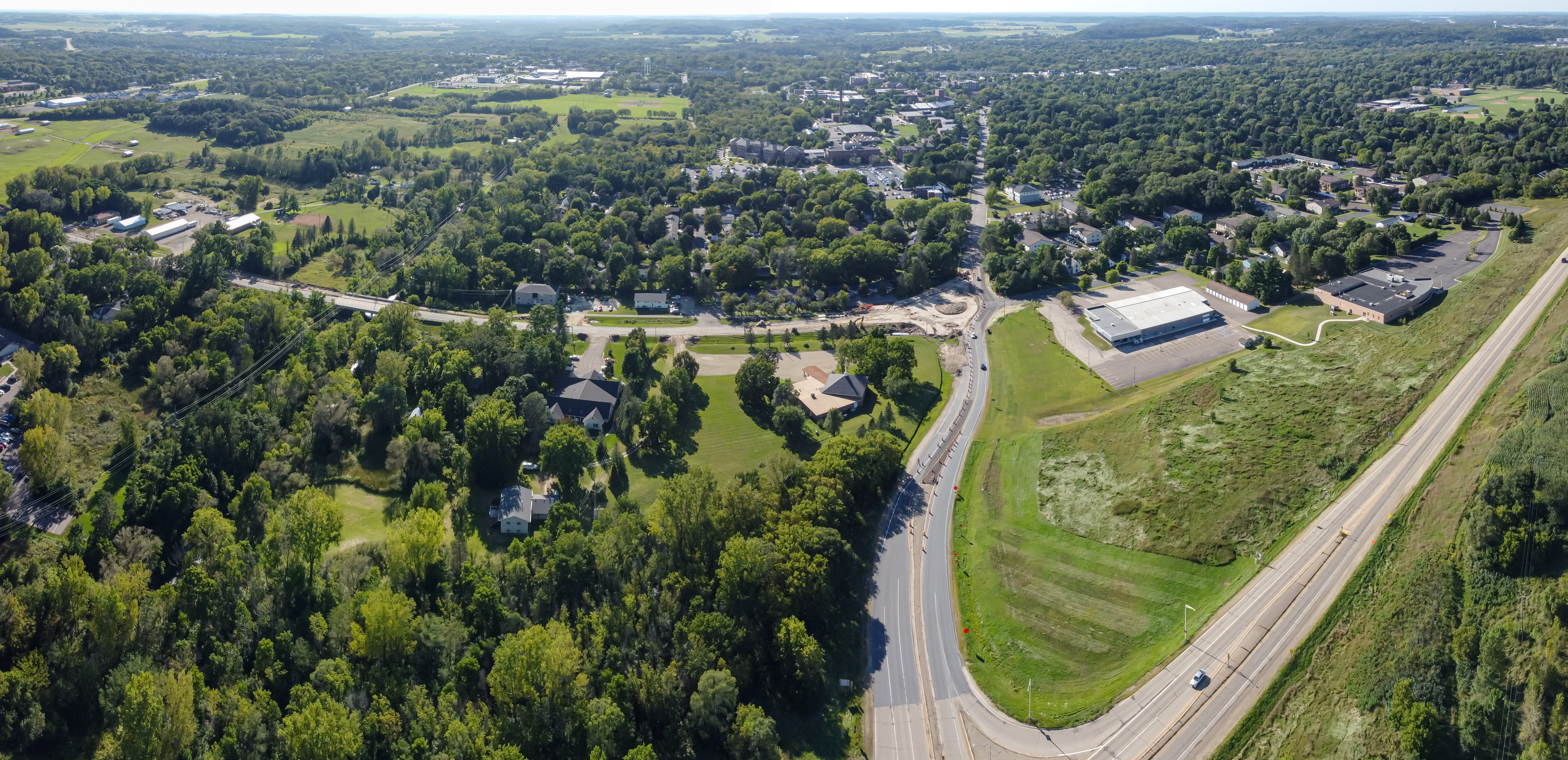

=== Climate ===
Climate data for River Falls, Wisconsin (1991–2020 normals, extremes 1918–present)
Month	Jan	Feb	Mar	Apr	May	Jun	Jul	Aug	Sep	Oct	Nov	Dec	Year
Record high °F (°C)	57 (14)	63 (17)	81 (27)	92 (33)	96 (36)	106 (41)	109 (43)	103 (39)	103 (39)	90 (32)	78 (26)	66 (19)	109 (43)
Mean daily maximum °F (°C)	22.0 (−5.6)	27.1 (−2.7)	40.1 (4.5)	55.2 (12.9)	67.6 (19.8)	77.1 (25.1)	81.5 (27.5)	79.1 (26.2)	71.4 (21.9)	57.2 (14.0)	40.8 (4.9)	27.4 (−2.6)	53.9 (12.2)
Daily mean °F (°C)	13.2 (−10.4)	17.3 (−8.2)	29.9 (−1.2)	43.4 (6.3)	55.5 (13.1)	65.4 (18.6)	69.9 (21.1)	67.7 (19.8)	60.2 (15.7)	46.7 (8.2)	32.3 (0.2)	19.6 (−6.9)	43.4 (6.3)
Mean daily minimum °F (°C)	4.3 (−15.4)	7.6 (−13.6)	19.6 (−6.9)	31.6 (−0.2)	43.4 (6.3)	53.8 (12.1)	58.3 (14.6)	56.3 (13.5)	49.0 (9.4)	36.2 (2.3)	23.8 (−4.6)	11.9 (−11.2)	33.0 (0.6)
Record low °F (°C)	−42 (−41)	−47 (−44)	−38 (−39)	−8 (−22)	19 (−7)	30 (−1)	37 (3)	32 (0)	22 (−6)	5 (−15)	−19 (−28)	−36 (−38)	−47 (−44)
Average precipitation inches (mm)	0.90 (23)	0.85 (22)	1.67 (42)	3.08 (78)	4.29 (109)	5.03 (128)	4.39 (112)	4.68 (119)	3.56 (90)	2.95 (75)	1.58 (40)	1.08 (27)	34.06 (865)
Source: NOAA

== Demographics ==
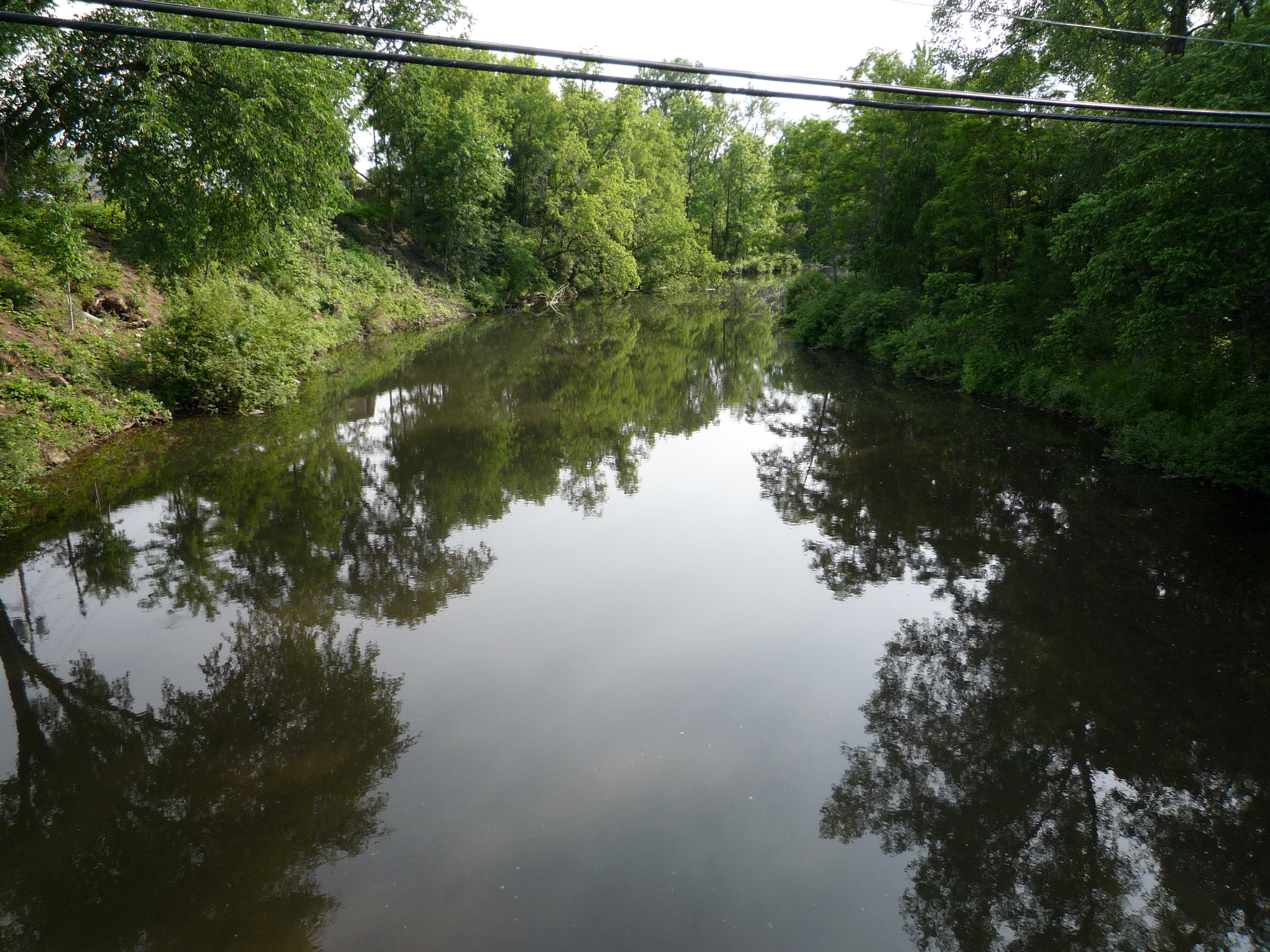
Kinnickinnic River, downtown River Falls

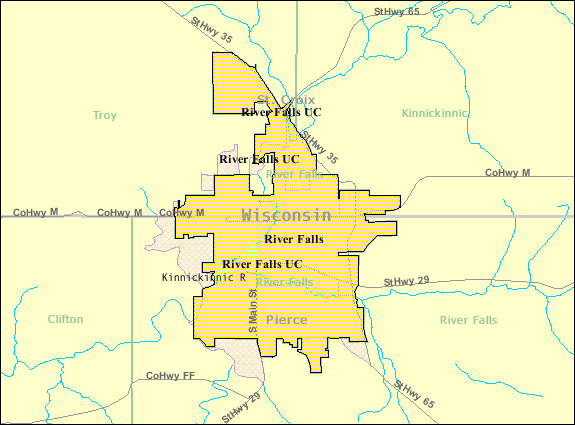
Outline map of River Falls

Historical population
Census	Pop.	Note	%±
1860	272		—
1870	741		172.4%
1880	1,499		102.3%
1890	1,783		18.9%
1900	2,008		12.6%
1910	1,991		−0.8%
1920	2,273		14.2%
1930	2,363		4.0%
1940	2,806		18.7%
1950	3,877		38.2%
1960	4,857		25.3%
1970	7,238		49.0%
1980	9,019		24.6%
1990	10,610		17.6%
2000	12,560		18.4%
2010	15,000		19.4%
2020	16,182		7.9%
2025 (est.)	17,916		10.7%
U.S. Decennial Census

=== 2020 census ===
As of the 2020 census, River Falls had a population of 16,182. The median age was 27.6 years. 18.5% of residents were under the age of 18 and 12.3% of residents were 65 years of age or older. For every 100 females there were 86.1 males, and for every 100 females age 18 and over there were 82.4 males age 18 and over.

99.0% of residents lived in urban areas and 1.0% in rural areas.

There were 5,719 households in River Falls, of which 27.8% had children under the age of 18 living in them. Of all households, 40.9% were married-couple households, 21.8% were households with a male householder and no spouse or partner present, and 28.7% were households with a female householder and no spouse or partner present. About 30.3% of all households were made up of individuals and 10.1% had someone living alone who was 65 years of age or older.

There were 5,931 housing units, of which 3.6% were vacant. The homeowner vacancy rate was 0.6% and the rental vacancy rate was 2.3%.

Racial composition as of the 2020 census
Race	Number	Percent
White	14,461	89.4%
Black or African American	309	1.9%
American Indian and Alaska Native	147	0.9%
Asian	194	1.2%
Native Hawaiian and Other Pacific Islander	10	0.1%
Some other race	206	1.3%
Two or more races	855	5.3%
Hispanic or Latino (of any race)	675	4.2%

=== 2010 census ===
At the 2010 census there were 15,000 people, 5,150 households, and 2,812 families in the city. The population density was 2,300.6 inhabitants per square mile (888.3/km^{2}). There were 5,449 housing units at an average density of 835.7 per square mile (322.7/km^{2}). The racial makeup of the city was 94.8% White, 1.2% African American, 0.4% Native American, 1.5% Asian, 0.5% from other races, and 1.6% from two or more races. Hispanic or Latino people of any race were 1.8%.

Of the 5,150 households 28.2% had children under the age of 18 living with them, 40.6% were married couples living together, 9.9% had a female householder with no husband present, 4.1% had a male householder with no wife present, and 45.4% were non-families. 27.1% of households were one person and 8.4% were one person aged 65 or older. The average household size was 2.42 and the average family size was 2.89.

The median age was 24.2 years. 17.2% of residents were under the age of 18; 34.5% were between the ages of 18 and 24; 23% were from 25 to 44; 17% were from 45 to 64; and 8.2% were 65 or older. The gender makeup of the city was 46.8% male and 53.2% female.

=== 2000 census ===
At the 2000 census there were 12,560 people, 4,269 households, and 2,335 families in the city. The population density was 2,524.0 inhabitants per square mile (974.5/km^{2}). There were 4,346 housing units at an average density of 873.2 per square mile (337.1/km^{2}). The racial makeup of the city was 96.57% White, 0.53% Black or African American, 0.36% Native American, 1.02% Asian, 0.09% Pacific Islander, 0.32% from other races, and 1.12% from two or more races. Hispanic or Latino people of any race were 0.95%.

Of the 4,269 households, 29.1% had children under the age of 18 living with them, 42.7% were married couples living together, 9.1% had a female householder with no husband present, and 45.3% were non-families. 27.7% of households were one person and 9.1% were one person aged 65 or older. The average household size was 2.44 and the average family size was 2.98.

The age distribution was 17.9% under the age of 18, 35.1% from 18 to 24, 23.8% from 25 to 44, 14.6% from 45 to 64, and 8.6% 65 or older. The median age was 24 years. For every 100 females, there were 83.5 males. For every 100 females age 18 and over, there were 80.1 males.

The median household income was $41,184 and the median family income was $60,253. Males had a median income of $36,275 versus $27,345 for females. The per capita income for the city was $17,667. About 4.4% of families and 14.9% of the population were below the poverty line, including 6.6% of those under age 18 and 11.1% of those age 65 or over.

== Education ==
School District of River Falls operates public schools. River Falls High School is the district's public high school. Meyer Middle School acts as the district's middle school. There are also 5 public elementary schools in the school district.

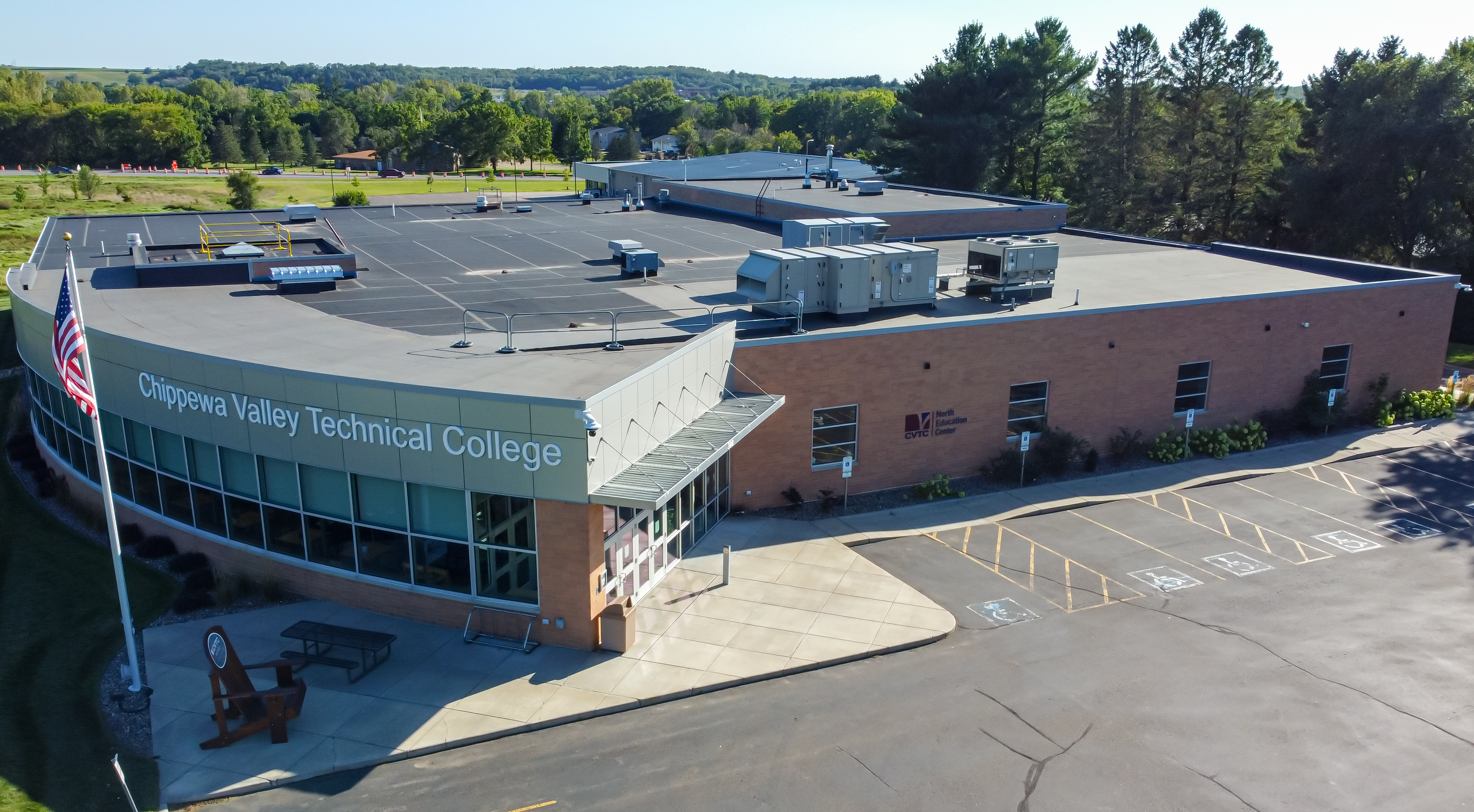
CVTC in River Falls

River Falls is home to the University of Wisconsin-River Falls and a branch of the Chippewa Valley Technical College.

== Recreation ==
The Kinnickinnic River, which flows through the heart of the city and its downtown business district, is a popular recreational attraction in River Falls for fly fishers and kayakers.

On the bluffs of the Kinnickinnic River is Glen Park, a 41-acre park established in 1898. The park has playgrounds, a swimming pool, soccer fields, a softball diamond, basketball courts, horseshoe pits, a gazebo, and several miles of walking trails. The Glen Park Pool was built in 1937 and renovated for its 75th anniversary in 2012. Glen Park's Swinging Bridge offers a view of the South Fork rapids as it enters the Kinnickinnic River. The bridge, a replica of one designed by the Minneapolis Bridge Company and constructed in 1925, is a suspension bridge that spans the South Fork Rapids at the site of the former Cascade Mill and Dam. Below the bridge are fishing, swimming, and picnic spots.

Hoffman Park, northeast of downtown River Falls, is a 53-acre (21 ha) facility that contains baseball fields, a nine-hole disc golf course, a campsite, a skate park, volleyball courts, and the Tri-Angels Playground. The playground opened in 2015 and is named after Amara, Sophie, and Cecilia Schaffhausen, who were murdered by their father, Aaron Schaffhausen. It is accessible to disabled children and built with designs referring to the three girls. It was constructed at a cost of $550,000 by volunteers.

Another attraction is The Falls Theater, a movie theater.

== Notable people ==
- Aldrich Hazen Ames, C.I.A. counter-intelligence officer and analyst; convicted in 1994 of spying for the Soviet Union and Russia
- Abraham D. Andrews, Wisconsin state senator
- Lynn H. Ashley, Wisconsin State Assembly
- Jule Berndt, Wisconsin State Assembly
- William Berndt, Wisconsin state senator
- Kevin Black, All American wrestler and Olympic coach
- Matt Bowen, collegiate basketball coach
- Ellsworth Burnett, Wisconsin State Assembly
- Karyn Bye-Dietz, Olympic gold medal athlete
- Alex Call, MLB outfielder
- Anna Dodge, actress
- Michael P. Early, Wisconsin State Assembly
- J. P. Feyereisen, MLB relief pitcher
- Jim Hall, creator of FreeDOS
- Sheila Harsdorf, Wisconsin state senator
- Nils Pederson Haugen (1849–1931), U.S. representative from Wisconsin
- Jay R. Hinckley, Wisconsin State Assembly
- Robert P. Knowles, Wisconsin state senator
- Warren P. Knowles, governor of Wisconsin
- Maria Lamb, Olympic athlete and national champion speedskater
- Linde Lee Jacobs, nurse and health advocate
- Doug Lloyd, NFL player
- Freeman Lord, Wisconsin State Assembly
- Landon Lueck, reality TV star and professional cyclist
- Mark Neumann, U.S. representative
- Frank Nye, U.S. representative from Minnesota
- Francis Paul Prucha, Roman Catholic priest and educator
- Frankie Rayder, fashion model
- Missy Rayder, fashion model
- Dick Ritger, former professional ten-pin bowler and bowling coach; member of the PBA and USBC Halls of Fame
- George B. Skogmo, Wisconsin state senator
- David F. Swensen, chief investment officer of the Yale University endowment
- Horace Adolphus Taylor, Wisconsin state senator
- Kenneth S. White, Wisconsin state senator
- Stanley York, Wisconsin State Assembly
- Shannon Zimmerman, businessman
