= School District of River Falls =

School district in Wisconsin, United States

School District of River Falls is a school district headquartered in River Falls, Wisconsin.

== Schools ==
- River Falls High School
- Meyer Middle School
- Elementary schools:
  - Greenwood
  - Montessori
  - Rocky Branch
  - Westside
- Renaissance Charter Academy
