= Kevin Williamson (basketball) =

American college basketball coach

Current position
- Title: Head coach
- Team: Dakota State
- Conference: Frontier
- Record: 23–11 (.676)

Playing career
- 2005–2007: Great Falls (basketball)
- 2005–2007: Great Falls (golf)

Coaching career (HC unless noted)
- 2007–2008: Kofa HS
- 2008–2009: Cathedral Catholic HS
- 2009–2010: Glendale CC (assistant)
- 2010–2012: Bemidji State (assistant)
- 2012–2015: Minnesota Duluth (assistant)
- 2015–2017: Dixie State (assistant)
- 2017–2018: Grays Harbor
- 2018–2019: CSU San Marcos (assistant)
- 2019: CSU San Marcos (interim HC)
- 2019–2024: Saint Katherine
- 2024–2025: Dakota Wesleyan
- 2025–present: Dakota State

Head coaching record
- Overall: 132–87 (.603) (college); 38–25 (.603) (high school)
- Tournaments: 0–3 (NAIA)

Accomplishments and honors

Championships
- AIA Gila Valley Region (2008); NCCAA West Region (2020); Cal Pac regular season (2022); Cal Pac tournament (2022)

Awards
- Gila Valley Region Coach of the Year (2008); NCCAA West Region Coach of the Year (2020)

Kevin Williamson is an American college basketball coach, currently head men's basketball coach at Dakota State University.

== Early life ==
Williamson played collegiate basketball and golf at the University of Great Falls (now known as the University of Providence) and graduated with a Bachelor of Arts degree in secondary education, health, and physical education in 2007.

== Coaching career ==
=== Early coaching career ===
Following his graduation he spent the 2007–08 season as the head coach at Kofa High School in Yuma, Arizona. While there he led Kofa to the AIA 5A Division II State Quarterfinals, eventually losing to Ironwood Ridge HS by a score of 75–31. He then went to Cathedral Catholic High School in San Diego, California for one season before receiving his first collegiate coaching opportunity at Glendale Community College in Glendale, Arizona as an assistant coach.

Williamson would then spend five seasons as an assistant coach under Matt Bowen. The first two seasons were spent at Bemidji State University in Bemidji, Minnesota, then when Bowen was hired at the University of Minnesota Duluth, Williamson followed him and was an assistant for the Bulldogs for three seasons.

He was then hired at Dixie State University (now Utah Tech University) where he spent two years as an assistant coach for the Trailblazers.

=== Grays Harbor ===
In July 2017 it was announced that Williams would receive his first collegiate head coaching job at Grays Harbor College in Aberdeen, Washington. He spent one season with the Chokers, accumulating an overall record of 4–24 (1–13 NWAC).

=== CSU San Marcos ===
Williams then spent one season as an assistant coach at California State University, San Marcos in San Marcos, California. He was named as the interim head coach of the Cougars for the final two games of the season against CSU East Bay and CSU Monterey Bay, both of which he won.

=== Saint Katherine ===
In June 2019 it was announced that Williams would be named as the next head coach at the University of Saint Katherine in San Marcos, California. He spent 5 seasons leading the Firebirds, accumulating an overall record of 83–42. He also led the team to two NAIA tournament appearances in 2022 and 2024, as well as winning a California Pacific Conference regular season and tournament championship in 2022. However, in April 2024 the University of Saint Katherine announced that it was filing for bankruptcy and officially closing following the end of the school year.

=== Dakota Wesleyan ===
In 2024, Williamson was hired as the next head coach at Dakota Wesleyan University in Mitchell, South Dakota. He spent one season with the Tigers, accumulating an overall record of 20–10 (13–7 GPAC). They would make it to the 2024 NAIA men's basketball tournament, but lost to The Master's University in the first round.

=== Dakota State ===
On April 22, 2025, Williamson was announced as the next head coach of the Dakota State Trojans men's basketball team. The Trojans are members of the Frontier Conference.

== Head coaching record ==
=== College ===
Record table
| Season | Team | Overall | Conference | Standing | Postseason |
|---|---|---|---|---|---|
Grays Harbor (Northwest Athletic Conference West) (2017–2018)
| 2017–18 | Grays Harbor | 4–24 | 1–13 | 8th | |
| Grays Harbor: | | 4–24 (.143) | 1–13 (.071) | | |
CSU San Marcos (California Collegiate Athletic Association) (2019–2019)
| 2018–19 | CSU San Marcos * | 2–0 | 2–0 | | |
| CSU San Marcos: | | 2–0 (1.000) | 2–0 (1.000) | | |
Saint Katherine (NCCAA West Region) (2019–2020)
| 2019–20 | Saint Katherine | 15–10 | 7–0 | 1st | |
Saint Katherine (California Pacific Conference) (2020–2024)
| 2020–21 | Saint Katherine ** | 6–6 | | | |
| 2021–22 | Saint Katherine | 19–9 | 13–1 | 1st | NAIA first round |
| 2022–23 | Saint Katherine | 20–8 | 16–5 | 2nd | |
| 2023–24 | Saint Katherine | 23–9 | 16–7 | 3rd | NAIA first round |
| Saint Katherine: | | 83–42 (.664) | 52–13 (.800) | | |
Dakota Wesleyan (Great Plains Athletic Conference) (2024–2025)
| 2024–25 | Dakota Wesleyan | 20–10 | 13–7 | 5th | NAIA first round |
| Dakota Wesleyan: | | 20–10 (.667) | 13–7 (.650) | | |
Dakota State (Frontier Conference) (2025–present)
| 2025–26 | Dakota State | 18–10 | 13–9 | 6th | |
| 2026–27 | Dakota State | 5–1 | 1–0 | | |
| Dakota State: | | 23–11 (.676) | 14–9 (.609) | | |
| Total: | | 132–87 (.603) | | | |
National champion Postseason invitational champion Conference regular season champion Conference regular season and conference tournament champion Division regular season champion Division regular season and conference tournament champion Conference tournament champion

* -- Denotes interim head coach
** -- Season was shortened due to the COVID-19 pandemic

=== High School ===
Record table
| Season | Team | Overall | Conference | Standing | Postseason |
|---|---|---|---|---|---|
Kofa HS (AIA Gila Valley Region) (2007–2008)
| 2007–08 | Kofa HS | 21–11 | 6–2 | 1st | AIA 5A DII Quarterfinals |
| Kofa HS: | | 21–11 (.656) | | | |
Cathedral Catholic HS (CIF San Diego Western) (2008–2009)
| 2008–09 | Cathedral Catholic HS | 17–14 | 6–6 | 3rd | CIF DIII first round |
| Cathedral Catholic HS: | | 17–14 (.548) | | | |
| Total: | | 38–25 (.603) | | | |
National champion Postseason invitational champion Conference regular season champion Conference regular season and conference tournament champion Division regular season champion Division regular season and conference tournament champion Conference tournament champion

== Personal life ==
Williamson graduated from Bemidji State University in 2013 with a Master of Science degree in sports studies. He has a wife named Vanessa.
