= Shirley, Maine =

Town in Maine, United States

- Town
- Location in Piscataquis County and the state of Maine.
- Coordinates: 45°20′51″N 69°37′52″W
- Country: United States
- State: Maine
- County: Piscataquis

Area
  - Total: 54.14 sq mi (140.22 km^{2})
  - Land: 53.31 sq mi (138.07 km^{2})
  - Water: 0.83 sq mi (2.15 km^{2})
- Elevation: 1,047 ft (319 m)

Population (2020)
  - Total: 251
  - Density: 4.7/sq mi (1.8/km^{2})
- Time zone: UTC-5 (Eastern (EST))
  - Summer (DST): UTC-4 (EDT)
- ZIP Code: 04485 (Shirley Mills)
- Area code: 207
- FIPS code: 23-68140
- GNIS feature ID: 0582724
- Website: shirleymaine.org

Shirley is a town in Piscataquis County, Maine, United States. The town was named after Shirley, Massachusetts. The population was 251 at the 2020 census. It was the birthplace of humorist Bill Nye.

== Geography ==
According to the United States Census Bureau, the town has a total area of 54.14 square miles (140.22 km^{2}), of which 53.31 square miles (138.07 km^{2}) is land and 0.83 square miles (2.15 km^{2}) is water.

== Demographics ==
Historical population
Census	Pop.	Note	%±
1840	190		—
1850	250		31.6%
1860	282		12.8%
1870	206		−27.0%
1880	253		22.8%
1890	291		15.0%
1900	248		−14.8%
1910	334		34.7%
1920	273		−18.3%
1930	197		−27.8%
1940	236		19.8%
1950	212		−10.2%
1960	214		0.9%
1970	174		−18.7%
1980	242		39.1%
1990	271		12.0%
2000	183		−32.5%
2010	233		27.3%
2020	251		7.7%
U.S. Decennial Census

=== 2010 census ===
As of the census of 2010, there were 233 people, 116 households, and 63 families living in the town. The population density was 4.4 inhabitants per square mile (1.7/km^{2}). There were 248 housing units at an average density of 4.7 per square mile (1.8/km^{2}). The racial makeup of the town was 99.6% White and 0.4% Asian.

There were 116 households, of which 10.3% had children under the age of 18 living with them, 49.1% were married couples living together, 2.6% had a female householder with no husband present, 2.6% had a male householder with no wife present, and 45.7% were non-families. 36.2% of all households were made up of individuals, and 8.6% had someone living alone who was 65 years of age or older. The average household size was 2.01 and the average family size was 2.63.

The median age in the town was 53.6 years. 12.9% of residents were under the age of 18; 3% were between the ages of 18 and 24; 19.8% were from 25 to 44; 44.1% were from 45 to 64; and 20.2% were 65 years of age or older. The gender makeup of the town was 53.6% male and 46.4% female.

=== 2000 census ===
As of the census of 2000, there were 183 people, 81 households, and 57 families living in the town. The population density was 3.5 people per square mile (1.3/km^{2}). There were 189 housing units at an average density of 3.6 per square mile (1.4/km^{2}). The racial makeup of the town was 98.36% White, and 1.64% from two or more races.

There were 81 households, out of which 23.5% had children under the age of 18 living with them, 63.0% were married couples living together, 3.7% had a female householder with no husband present, and 28.4% were non-families. 23.5% of all households were made up of individuals, and 12.3% had someone living alone who was 65 years of age or older. The average household size was 2.26 and the average family size was 2.67.

In the town, the population was spread out, with 19.1% under the age of 18, 3.8% from 18 to 24, 26.8% from 25 to 44, 36.6% from 45 to 64, and 13.7% who were 65 years of age or older. The median age was 45 years. For every 100 females, there were 96.8 males. For every 100 females age 18 and over, there were 108.5 males.

The median income for a household in the town was $27,708, and the median income for a family was $32,083. Males had a median income of $36,250 versus $23,333 for females. The per capita income for the town was $14,487. About 3.0% of families and 3.2% of the population were below the poverty line, including none of those under the age of eighteen and 17.6% of those 65 or over.

== Notable people ==
- Joseph Dankowski, photographer
- Edgar Wilson Nye, journalist and humorist (known popularly as Bill Nye)
- Frank Nye, politician and jurist
