= Joseph Dankowski =

American photographer

Joseph Dankowski (September 2, 1932 – November 5, 2010) was an American fine art photographer, best known for his 50 print portfolio "Manholes and Gutters" (1969–71).

A resident of Shirley, Maine, he was born in Camden, New Jersey on September 2, 1932. He began his artistic career as a painter and sculptor.

After moving to New York City in 1958, he took up photography, working mostly in black and white reportage style, influenced by Eugène Atget, Harry Callahan, Robert Frank and Bruce Davidson. In 1972, he received one of the first National Endowment for the Arts grants to a photographer and master printer.

Dankowski moved to Shirley, Maine in 1974, where he continued to photograph in both black and white and color. His work in Maine focused on the portfolio “Fall in Black and White”, a sequence of Ice on the River photographs, portraits and photographs of the natural world.

Dankowki's "Manholes and Gutters" are in the Museum of Modern Art in New York, The Smithsonian American Art Museum in Washington, D.C., The Bowdoin College Museum of Art in Brunswick, Maine, The Joy of Giving Something Collection and private collections.
