= Kenneth S. White =

American politician

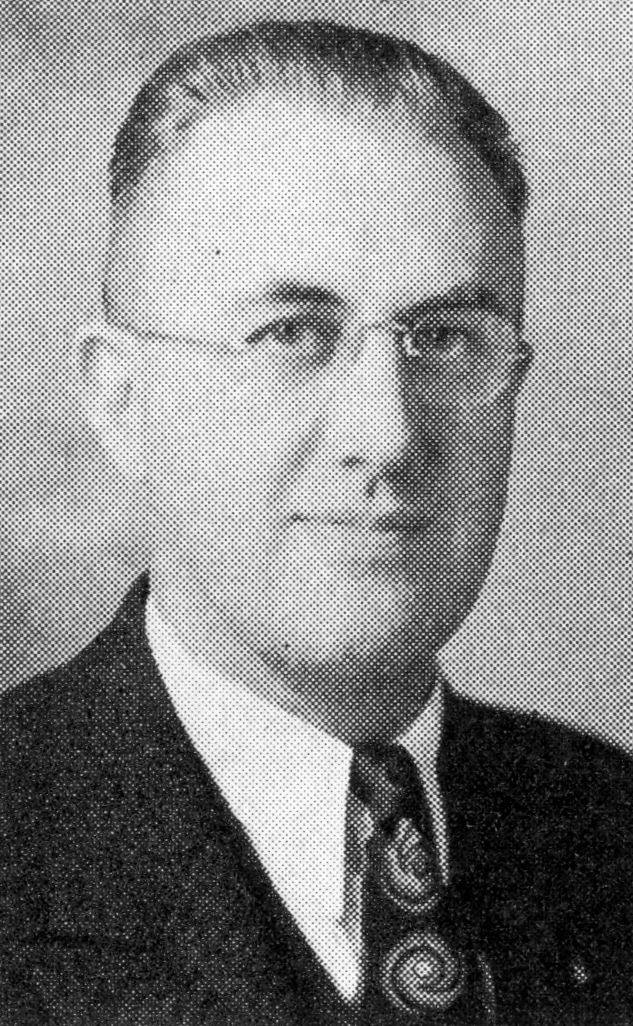
Kenneth S. White

Kenneth S. White was a member of the Wisconsin State Senate. He became Senator and Judge on the Wisconsin Circuit Court.

== Biography ==
White was born Kenneth Sidney White on January 17, 1897, in River Falls, Wisconsin where he graduated from River Falls High School in 1914. He attended the University of Wisconsin-River Falls, the University of Minnesota Law School and the University of Wisconsin Law School. During World War I, he served with the United States Army in the American Expeditionary Forces. On June 13, 1924, White married Helen Dorothy Kyle. He died on December 10, 1976.

== Political career ==
White was elected to the Senate in 1936. He had previously been District Attorney of Pierce County, Wisconsin and a member of the Pierce County Board. From 1954 to 1956, he was a judge on the Wisconsin Circuit Court. Additionally, White was a delegate to the 1936 Republican National Convention.
