= Chippewa Valley Technical College =

Public college in Eau Claire, Wisconsin, US

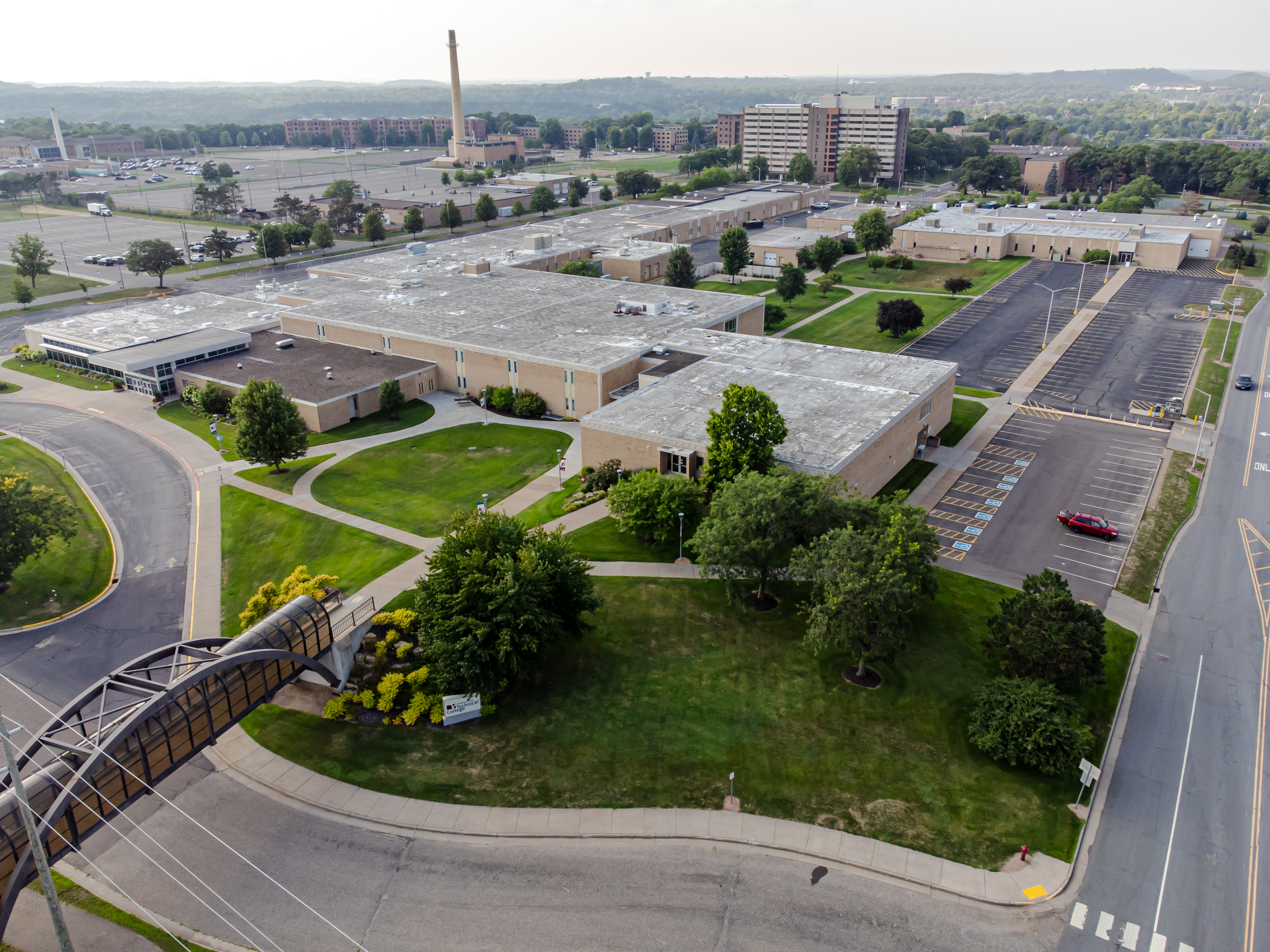
- Motto: Your Dreams. Our Mission.
- Type: Public technical college
- Established: 1912
- President: Dr. Sunem Beaton-Garcia
- Academic staff: 490
- Students: 8,198
- Location: Eau Claire, Wisconsin, United States
- Colors: Maroon and blue
- Nickname: River Otters
- Mascot: Ollie the Otter
- Website: cvtc.edu

Chippewa Valley Technical College (CVTC) is one of the 16 technical and community colleges in the Wisconsin Technical College System, centered in Eau Claire, Wisconsin. It serves an 11-county area, with its primary campus in Eau Claire and smaller regional campuses across western Wisconsin, including in Chippewa Falls, Menomonie, Neillsville and River Falls.

The school offers associate degree and technical diploma programs, as well as other certifications and adult continuing education programs. In the 2024–25 school year, 8,198 students were enrolled in programs and 17,425 students in continuing education.

CVTC's president is Dr. Sunem Beaton-Garcia.

== Academics ==
CVTC offers 51 associate's degrees and 17 certificates across a variety of fields of study, including agriculture, business, construction, healthcare, and production trades.

== See also ==
- Eau Claire Vocational School Building
