= Matt Bowen (basketball) =

American college basketball coach

Coaching career (HC unless noted)
- 1990–1995: Indiana (student assistant)
- 1995–2002: UAB (assistant)
- 2002–2006: Valparaiso (assistant)
- 2006–2012: Bemidji State
- 2012–2018: Minnesota Duluth
- 2018–2023: Valparaiso (assistant)

Head coaching record
- Overall: 132–212 (.384)
- Tournaments: 0–1 (NCAA DII)

Accomplishments and honors

Championships
- NSIC regular season (2012)

Awards
- NSIC Coach of the Year (2012)

Matt Bowen is an American college basketball coach, formerly head men's basketball coach of the Bemidji State Beavers and the Minnesota Duluth Bulldogs.

== Career ==
Originally from River Falls, Wisconsin, Bowen attended Indiana University Bloomington from 1990 until 1995. While there, he served as a student assistant for the Indiana Hoosiers men's basketball team, who were at the time led by College Basketball Hall of Fame head coach Bob Knight. He graduated from Indiana University in 1995 with a Bachelor of Science degree in health, physical education, and recreation.

Following his graduation, Bowen was hired as an assistant coach under Gene Bartow at the University of Alabama at Birmingham from 1995 until 2002. While there the Blazers won a Conference USA National Division championship and appeared in one NCAA Tournament appearance.

From 2002 until 2006, Bowen was an assistant coach at Valparaiso University. Scott Drew was the head coach for the first season he spent there, then when he was hired by the Baylor Bears his father Homer Drew came out of retirement and was the head coach of the Valparaiso Beacons men's basketball team for the next three seasons that Bowen was there. While there the Beacons won back to back Mid-Continent Conference (now named the Summit League) regular season championships and one Mid-Continent Conference tournament championship, as well as appearing in one NCAA Division I men's basketball tournament.

In June 2006, Bowen was hired as the head coach of the Bemidji State Beavers. He spent six seasons with the Beavers, accumulating an overall record of 65–107 (46–74 NSIC). During the 2011–12 season, he led the Beavers to a 22–10 record (16–6 NSIC) and won a NSIC regular season championship as well as being awarded as the 2012 NSIC Coach of the Year.

On May 4, 2012, Bowen was announced as the next head coach of the Minnesota Duluth Bulldogs. He spent six seasons with the Bulldogs, accumulating an overall record of 67–105 and a 49–83 record in NSIC play. On February 26, 2018, it was announced that Bowen's contract would not be renewed.

Bowen then returned in 2018 to Valparaiso as an assistant coach, but when head coach Matt Lottich was fired in 2023, he was let go as well.

== Head coaching record ==
Statistics overview
Season	Team	Overall	Conference	Standing	Postseason
Bemidji State (Northern Sun Intercollegiate Conference) (2006–2012)
2006–07	Bemidji State	5–23	5–13	T–7th	
2007–08	Bemidji State	7–23	3–15	9th	
2008–09	Bemidji State	8–20	6–14	T–10th	
2009–10	Bemidji State	12–16	8–12	11th	
2010–11	Bemidji State	11–15	8–14	T–10th	
2011–12	Bemidji State	22–10	16–6	1st	NCAA DII first round
Bemidji State:		65–107 (.378)	46–74 (.383)		
Minnesota Duluth (Northern Sun Intercollegiate Conference) (2012–2018)
2012–13	Minnesota Duluth	8–19	6–16	14th	
2013–14	Minnesota Duluth	12–15	10–12	11th	
2014–15	Minnesota Duluth	16–14	12–10	T–7th	
2015–16	Minnesota Duluth	4–25	3–19	T–7th	
2016–17	Minnesota Duluth	15–14	11–11	15th	
2017–18	Minnesota Duluth	12–18	7–15	T–12th	
Minnesota Duluth:		67–105 (.390)	49–83 (.371)		
Total:		132–212 (.384)			
National champion Postseason invitational champion Conference regular season champion Conference regular season and conference tournament champion Division regular season champion Division regular season and conference tournament champion Conference tournament champion

== Coaching tree ==
Assistant coaches under Bowen who became NCAA, NAIA, or NBA head coaches

- Kevin Williamson – CSU San Marcos (2019), Saint Katherine (2019–2024), Dakota Wesleyan (2024–2025), Dakota State (2025–present)

== Personal life ==
Bowen graduated from the University of Alabama at Birmingham in 1999 with a master's degree in health education.
