= River Falls High School =

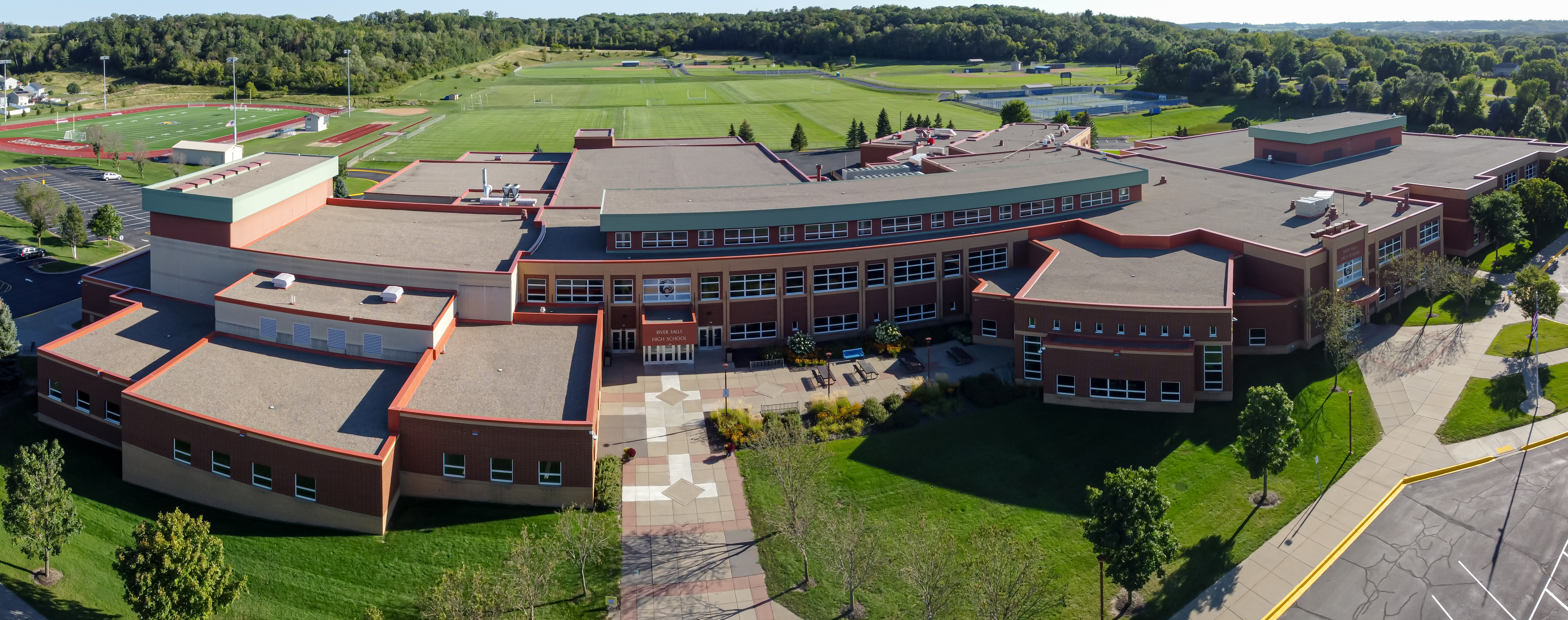

Location
- 818 Cemetery Road; River Falls, Wisconsin; United States; 44°50′24″N 92°36′54″W

Information
- Type: High school
- Established: 1887; 139 years ago
- School district: School District of River Falls
- Category: Secondary public
- Principal: Kit Luedtke
- Teaching staff: 67.98 (FTE)
- Grades: 9–12
- Gender: Co-educational
- Enrollment: 1,082 (2023-2024)
- Student to teacher ratio: 15.92
- Colors: Gold, white, and navy
- Athletics: Football, Baseball, Basketball, Swimming, Diving, Tennis, Gymnastics, Softball, Cross Country, Track, Volleyball, Wrestling, Golf, Hockey, Soccer, Robotics
- Mascot: Wildcat
- Accreditation: AdvancED
- Yearbook: Kinnick
- Website: River Falls High School

River Falls High School is a public high school in River Falls, Wisconsin.

== Extracurricular activities ==
=== Marching band ===
The RFHS marching band has won its class in marching band competition 24 times since 1985. It won state titles in 1985, 1987, 1989, 1990, 1991, 1992, 1994, 1995, 1999, 2000, 2005, 2007, 2008, 2009, 2010, 2011, 2012, 2013, 2016, 2019, 2021, 2022, and 2023. The band has also been nationally recognized through performances at the Fiesta, Outback and Gator Bowls, the Youth In Music Championships in Minneapolis, and the Bands of America - Super Regional in St. Louis.

=== Athletics ===
RFHS offers boys' baseball, girls' softball, boys' and girls' basketball, boys' and girls' cross country, boys' football, boys' and girls' golf, girls' gymnastics, boys' and girls' hockey, boys' and girls' soccer, boys' and girls' swimming and diving, boys' and girls' tennis, boys' and girls' track and field, girls' volleyball, and boys' wrestling (https://www.riverfallswrestling.org/).

Since 1989, RFHS has competed in the Big River Conference. Before 1989, it competed in the Middle Border Conference, being an inaugural member of that conference in 1932.

The school's co-op St. Croix Fusion girls' hockey team won state championships in 2009, 2010, and 2011. The girls' gymnastics team has made 22 state appearances, with 6 state championships.

RFHS has hosted numerous outstanding wrestling athletes and teams, with 18 individual state titles and 67 state placement medals from over 120 state qualifiers, and qualified for the WIAA Team State Tournament 5 times. Ten RFHS wrestlers have had undefeated seasons and one an undefeated career.

=== Athletic conference affiliation history ===
- Middle Border Conference (1931-1989)
- Big Rivers Conference (1989–present)

== Notable alumni ==
- Kevin Black (Class of 1998) – wrestling coach
- Annie Frisbie – long distance runner
- Jack Herum - basketball coach
- Warren P. Knowles – governor of Wisconsin
- Frankie Rayder – international fashion model
- Missy Rayder (Class of 1994) – international fashion model
- George B. Skogmo – Wisconsin State Senator
- Francis Paul Prucha – historian
- Karyn Bye-Dietz – Olympic Gold Medalist (women’s hockey)
- J. P. Feyereisen – Major League Baseball relief pitcher
- Jacqueline West (Class of 1998) – writer
- Alex Call - Major League Baseball World Series winner

=== Wildcat Hall of Fame ===
In 2011 a RFHS Hall of Fame was created for athletes, coaches, teams, distinguished citizens, and legacy members.
