= George Ross Smith =

American politician

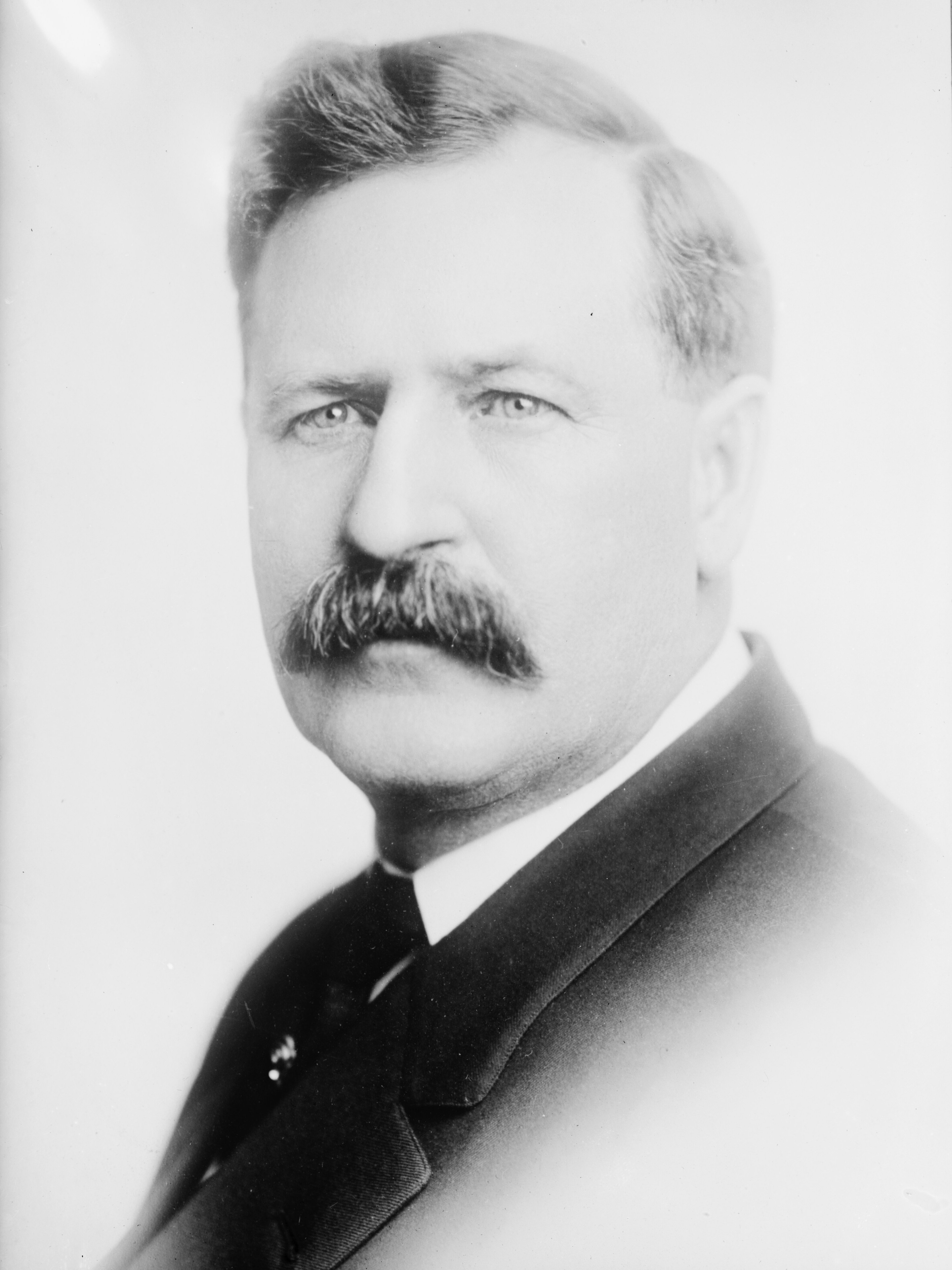

Member of the U.S. House of Representatives from Minnesota's 5th district
- In office March 4, 1913 – March 3, 1917
- Preceded by: Frank Nye
- Succeeded by: Ernest Lundeen

Personal details
- Born: May 28, 1864 St. Cloud, Minnesota, U.S.
- Died: November 7, 1952 (aged 88) Minneapolis, Minnesota, U.S
- Party: Republican
- Education: University of Minnesota

George Ross Smith (May 28, 1864 – November 7, 1952) was a U.S. representative from Minnesota.

== Early life and education ==
He was born in St. Cloud, Stearns County, Minnesota; attended the public schools and Sauk Centre (Minnesota) Academy; was graduated from the law school of the University of Minnesota at Minneapolis in 1893.

== Legal career ==
He was admitted to the bar in 1893 and commenced practice in Minneapolis. He became a member of the Minnesota House of Representatives in 1903, and was a judge of the probate court of Hennepin County, Minnesota from 1907 to 1913.

== Political career ==
He elected as a Republican to the Sixty-third and Sixty-fourth Congresses (March 4, 1913 – March 3, 1917); unsuccessful candidate for reelection in 1916 to the Sixty-fifth Congress; resumed the practice of law and taught law classes at Minneapolis-Minnesota Law School.

== Death ==
He died in Minneapolis on November 7, 1952, and was buried at St. Mary's Catholic Cemetery.

U.S. House of Representatives
Preceded by Frank Nye	Member of the U.S. House of Representatives from Minnesota's 5th congressional district 1913 – 1917	Succeeded by Ernest Lundeen
