= The Falls Theater =

Coordinates: 44.85838°N 92.62643°W

The Falls Theater is a theater located in River Falls, Wisconsin in the United States. The theater has been operating since 1927.

== History ==
=== Before the Theater ===
The first theater in River Falls opened from May to July 1908 and was named The Electric Theater Company. The theater was renamed The Gem in November 1909. The showtimes were 7, 8, and 9 o'clock at a cost of 5 to 10 cents. It was the only theater in town until The Princess opened in 1911. After a fire in 1926 that destroyed three buildings on the west side of Main street, plans were set in motion for a new and more modern theater to be built.

=== The Theater ===
The Falls Theater was built from January to July 1927, costing $25,000. Owned by Phil Ramer and Emil Carisch, it was leased by the George E. Miner Amusement Company from 1927 to 1952. The theater contained leather seats, curtains to reduce noise and light, two bathrooms, and two projectors. The first film to be shown was Painting the Town, with a price of 10-25 cents. The theater bought a neon sign in 1936. Although it did not have any concessions available, if popcorn was desired, it could be purchased across the street. During World War II, management changed to Archie McClellan. In 1952, the theater was sold to Jan and Agnes Morey of Minneapolis, who sold it three years later to Herbert Stolzman, who has made his career in the theater business. He remodeled the front, added a modern sign, which is still there today, and added a drink machine to a newer concession stand. After 17 years, he sold the theater to Stan McCulloch, who operated it until his death in January 2002. The theater is still owned and operated by McCulloch's family, and contains a large stage/screen and a second smaller screen completed in 2018.
