= Freeman Lord =

American politician (1842–1917)

Freeman Lord (1842–1917) was a member of the Wisconsin State Assembly.

== Biography ==
Lord was born Freeman Hersie Lord on March 10, 1842 in Hancock County, Maine. He moved to Oshkosh, Wisconsin in 1851 and to Pierce County, Wisconsin in 1853. During the American Civil War, he enlisted in the 30th Wisconsin Volunteer Infantry Regiment of the Union Army. In 1886, he married Hannah E. Preble. She died in 1913. In 1916, he married Ida Mae Barney. Lord died on November 17, 1917.

== Political career ==
Lord was elected to the Assembly in 1894 and was re-elected in 1895 and 1896. He was again elected to the Assembly in 1902. Previously, he had served as Assessor and Chairman of River Falls, Wisconsin. Lord was a Republican.
