= Shirley Mills, Maine =

- Village
- Location within Maine
- Coordinates: 45°21′56″N 69°37′05″W
- Country: United States
- State: Maine
- County: Piscataquis
- Elevation: 1,040 ft (320 m)
- Time zone: UTC-5 (Eastern (EST))
  - Summer (DST): UTC-4 (EDT)
- ZIP code: 04485
- Area code: 207
- GNIS feature ID: 575421

Shirley Mills is an unincorporated village in the town of Shirley, Piscataquis County, Maine, United States. The community is 23 miles (37 km) northwest of Dover-Foxcroft. Shirley Mills had a post office until June 20, 1986; it still has its own ZIP code, 04485.
