= Eau Claire Vocational School =

- U.S. National Register of Historic Places
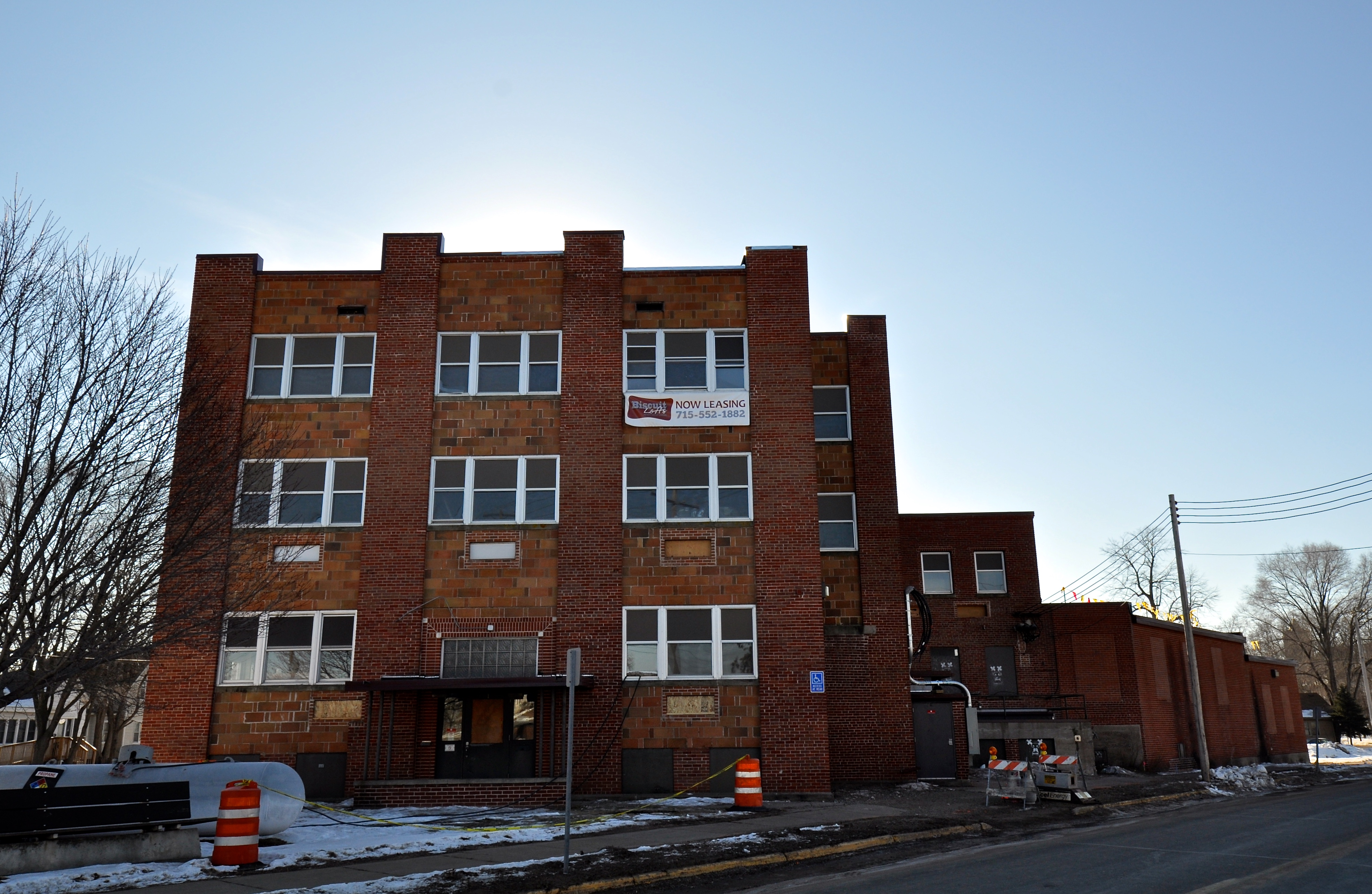
- Eau Claire Vocational School
- Location: 1300 1st Ave. Eau Claire, Wisconsin
- Built: 1891/1941-1942
- Architect: R. C. Melby
- NRHP reference No.: 14000917
- Added to NRHP: November 12, 2014

The Eau Claire Vocational School is located in Eau Claire, Wisconsin.

== History ==
The building served as a factory for several years for companies that built trunks, suitcases, telescope cases and phonographs. After being used as a warehouse, it was converted into a vocational school by the National Youth Administration in the early 1940s. During World War II, women were trained at the school to build equipment for the war effort.

In 1967, the school moved to larger facility and was later renamed the Chippewa Valley Technical College. Its former site would be used by the city to house its parks and recreation department. In 2014, it was added to the State and the National Register of Historic Places.
