= Edgar Wilson Nye =

American humorist

Edgar Wilson "Bill" Nye
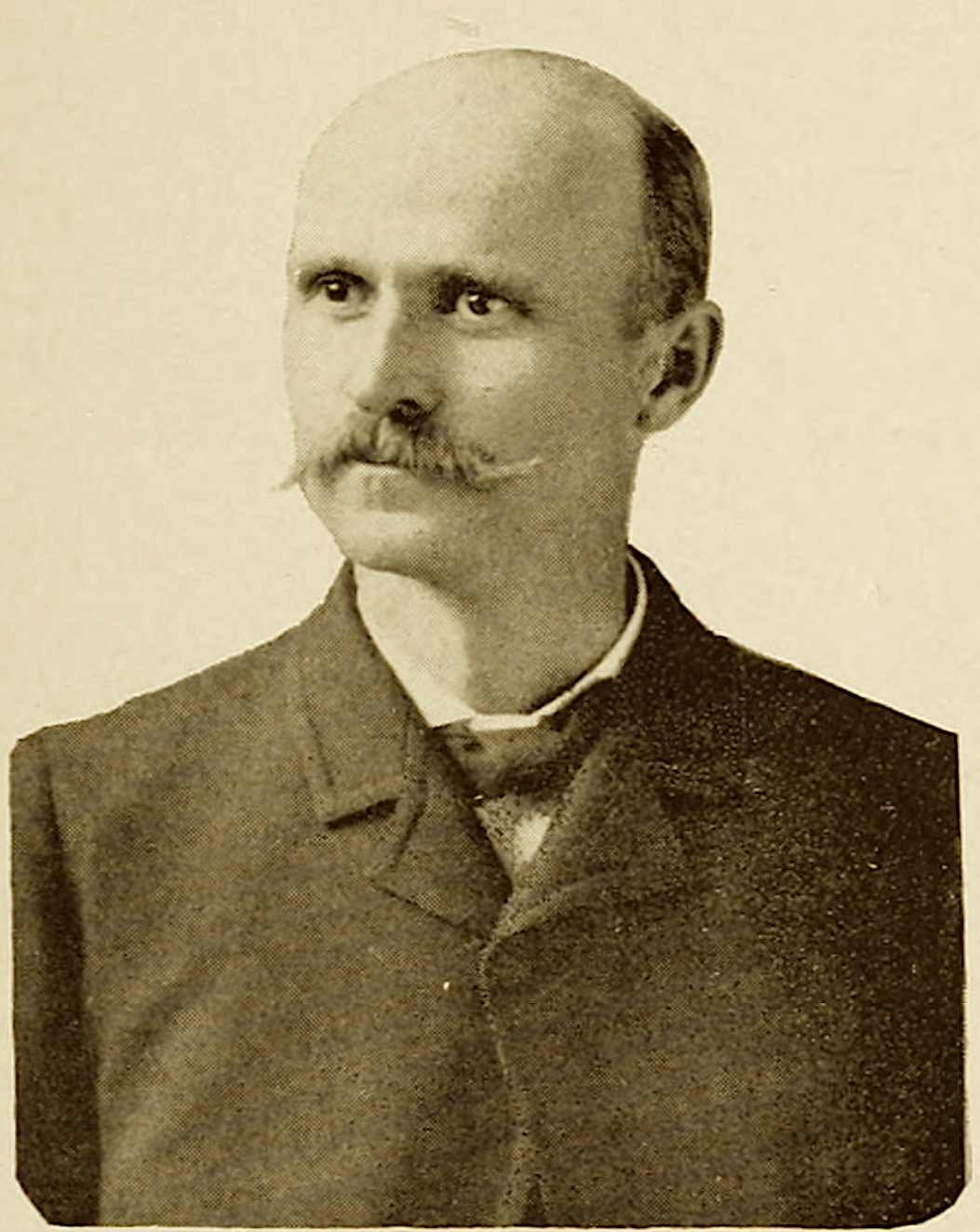
- Born: August 25, 1850; Shirley, Maine
- Died: February 22, 1896 (aged 45); Arden, North Carolina
- Occupations: Humorist, journalist

Edgar Wilson "Bill" Nye (August 25, 1850 – February 22, 1896) was an American journalist, humorist, author, and lecturer. He was best known for his humorous newspaper sketches and columns, many of which were based on his experiences in the American West. He founded and edited the Laramie Boomerang in Laramie, Wyoming Territory, and subsequently became a nationally syndicated newspaper writer and a popular lecturer. He was closely associated with the poet James Whitcomb Riley, with whom he toured and collaborated on Nye and Riley's Railway Guide (1888).

== Early life ==
Nye was born on August 25, 1850, in Shirley, Maine, the oldest of three sons of Franklin and Elizabeth Loring Nye. His father was a lumberman. In 1852 the family moved to a settlement on the St. Croix River in Wisconsin, where they took up farming. Nye received a common-school education, prepared for a career in law, and briefly taught school. He also began writing for local Wisconsin newspapers.

In 1876 Nye left Wisconsin and moved west to Laramie, Wyoming Territory. He studied law and passed the Wyoming bar examination. He served for a time as a justice of the peace and subsequently held several local public positions, including postmaster.

Nye's principal occupation soon became journalism. He contributed humorous sketches to the Laramie Daily Sentinel, and his accounts of western life were reprinted by newspapers outside Wyoming. His early newspaper work established the style that would make him nationally famous: deadpan narration, exaggeration, wordplay, mock seriousness, and frequent jokes at his own expense.

On March 7, 1877, Nye married Clara Frances Smith of Chicago, a music teacher. They had four children: Bessie, Winifred, Max, and Frank Wilson.

== The name "Bill Nye" ==
Nye used the name "Bill Nye" as a pen name. It came from the character Bill Nye in Bret Harte's poem "Plain Language from Truthful James", first published in the September 1870 issue of The Overland Monthly. In the poem, Bill Nye is a companion of the narrator, Truthful James, in a game of euchre with Ah Sin.

The name therefore predated Nye's literary career by a decade. By the time his humorous writing became nationally known, "Bill Nye" had become the name by which he was generally identified.

== The Laramie Boomerang ==
In 1881 Nye founded the Laramie Boomerang and became its editor. He named the newspaper after his gray mule, which he described as having an "eccentricity of his orbit." The mule and the unusual circumstances of the newspaper's production became recurring subjects of his humor.

The newspaper was initially produced in a room above a Laramie livery stable. Nye turned the location itself into a joke, directing visitors to "twist the tail of the iron gray mule and take the elevator." The paper's name, its mule emblem, and Nye's persona became closely associated with one another.

Nye's writing for the Boomerang brought him a much wider audience. His sketches of frontier life were reprinted in newspapers as far away as California and Texas, and his reputation soon extended beyond Wyoming.

His humor did not depend primarily on conventional punch lines. He often presented an absurd situation in the sober language of a newspaper report, allowing the discrepancy between the serious tone and the ridiculous subject to create the joke. He also made himself a frequent target, using his own appearance, occupations, failures, illnesses, and circumstances as comic material.

Nye edited the Boomerang for approximately three years. Three collections of material from this period were published: Bill Nye and Boomerang (1881), Forty Liars and Other Lies (1882), and Baled Hay (1884).

== From Wyoming to national celebrity ==
Nye's health deteriorated during his Wyoming years. He suffered an attack of spinal meningitis and was advised to seek a different climate. He spent a period in Greeley, Colorado, and subsequently returned to his childhood region of Wisconsin, living in Hudson before moving east to resume his newspaper career.

In 1885 Nye began a second career as a platform lecturer. He proved highly successful, and his lectures helped turn him from a successful newspaper humorist into a nationally recognized public figure. The Encyclopedia of the Great Plains describes his popularity as rivaling that of Mark Twain.

Nye joined the staff of the New York World in 1886. His newspaper work subsequently became nationally syndicated, and he contributed to major magazines as well as newspapers. By the end of the decade he was a widely recognized American humorist.

His appearance became part of his public identity. He was tall and spare, with a notably bald head and wire-frame spectacles. Illustrations and caricatures repeatedly emphasized his appearance, making his image familiar to newspaper readers and lecture audiences.

Nye also incorporated his appearance into his own humor. Baled Hay, for example, contains pieces concerning baldness and the "stage bald-head," treating his own conspicuous lack of hair as a recurring comic subject.

== Nye and James Whitcomb Riley ==
Nye became closely associated with the poet James Whitcomb Riley. The two men combined Nye's humor with Riley's poetry and sentiment on the national lecture circuit. Their partnership became one of the most successful lecture combinations of the period.

The lecture manager James B. Pond arranged the Nye–Riley partnership for the 1888–89 season. Pond later described the arrangements in his memoir Eccentricities of Genius, including a humorous joint biography in which Riley wrote Nye's life and Nye wrote Riley's.

The combination was especially successful during the 1889–90 season. Pond recalled that the tour did "a tremendous business" and that the Nye–Riley combination became more profitable than many theatrical companies.

Nye and Riley also collaborated on Nye and Riley's Railway Guide, published by the Dearborn Publishing Company in 1888. The book parodied the popular railway guides of the period and combined Nye's prose with Riley's poetry. It was illustrated by Baron DeGrimm, E. Zimmerman, and Walter Hugh McDougall.

The book was later reissued under other titles, including Nye and Riley's Wit and Humor and On the "Shoe-String" Limited with Nye and Riley.

Mark Twain introduced Nye and Riley at a performance in Boston in November 1888. Twain's introduction was subsequently included in collections of his speeches.

Pond's recollections also provide evidence of the close personal relationship between Nye and Riley. He described them as frequent practical jokers and recalled that their friendship continued after Pond's business association with Nye ended.

== Humor and literary style ==
Nye's humor developed from the tradition of nineteenth-century American newspaper humor associated with writers such as Mark Twain, Artemus Ward, and Josh Billings. His characteristic techniques included parody, exaggeration, puns, anticlimax, mock scholarship, and deliberately faulty logic.

His early work was particularly dependent on western subjects. Railroads, mining, ranching, agriculture, frontier politics, local boosters, travel, and western towns provided material for sketches that transformed ordinary experiences into comic narratives.

A characteristic Nye joke could begin with an apparently factual observation and proceed through increasingly absurd conclusions without abandoning the narrator's serious tone. The humor frequently depended on this contrast rather than on a separate punch line.

Self-deprecation was equally important. Nye repeatedly presented himself as the victim of the circumstances he was describing. His physical appearance, professional occupations, illnesses, financial circumstances, and mistakes became part of his comic persona.

Nye was also an accomplished pen-and-ink artist and sometimes illustrated his own articles. His books were illustrated by professional artists, including Frederick Burr Opper, whose drawings helped establish the familiar visual image of Nye as a tall, bald humorist.

As his career progressed, Nye's writing became less dependent on the broad frontier humor of his early work. The Encyclopedia of the Great Plains describes a gradual refinement of his style as he moved from local newspaper humor toward nationally distributed journalism and lecture performance.

== Later writing ==
Nye continued to publish collections of newspaper and magazine material throughout the 1880s and 1890s. Among them were Bill Nye's Cordwood, Bill Nye's Remarks, Bill Nye's Chestnuts Old and New, Bill Nye's Thinks, and Bill Nye's Red Book.

In 1894 he published Bill Nye's History of the United States, illustrated by Frederick Burr Opper. Rather than presenting conventional academic history, the book used historical events as material for comic narrative, exaggeration, parody, and cartoon illustration.

His Bill Nye's History of England from the Druids to the Reign of Henry VIII was published in 1896, the year of his death.

Nye also wrote about his own profession and experiences. His 1892 article "In Lighter Vein: Autobiography of an Editor", published in The Century Magazine, reflected on American humor and the relationship between hardship, self-mockery, and comedy.

== North Carolina ==
Nye first visited the Asheville area in 1886 and was impressed by its scenery and climate. He subsequently made western North Carolina his permanent home.

In 1891 he moved to Arden, North Carolina, south of Asheville. He lived at Buck Shoals on the east side of the French Broad River and continued to write and lecture despite recurrent health problems.

Nye also wrote humorously about his new surroundings. His descriptions of western North Carolina treated the climate, landscape, local people, and prominent residents as material for the same combination of observation and exaggeration that had characterized his earlier western writing.

On December 29, 1891, Nye and former North Carolina governor Zebulon B. Vance were featured speakers at a banquet in Asheville. The event was reportedly marked by prolonged laughter from the audience.

== Life's end ==
Nye's health remained poor during his final years. His earlier attack of spinal meningitis had been followed by continuing health problems, although he continued his writing and lecture work.

He died at Buck Shoals on February 22, 1896, aged 45. He was buried in the churchyard of Calvary Episcopal Church in Fletcher, North Carolina. A memorial monument was erected at his grave in 1925.

After Nye’s death, Mark Twain described him as “that real humorist, that gentle good soul,” and wished “peace to his ashes.” Then came a humorous fictional anecdote. “He was the baldest human being I ever saw. His whole skull was brilliantly shining. It was like a dome with the sun flashing on it…. One day he fell overboard from a ferry boat and when he came up a woman’s voice broke high above the tumult of frightened and anxious exclamations and said: ‘You shameless thing! Go down and come up the other way!’”

== Legacy ==
Nye became one of the most recognizable American humorists of the late nineteenth century. His career combined several forms of mass entertainment that were expanding rapidly during the period: newspaper syndication, illustrated books, magazine publication, and the national lecture circuit.

His years in Wyoming were particularly important to his career. Although he spent only part of his life there, the experiences and characters of Wyoming supplied much of the material that first made him nationally known. The Laramie Boomerang and the persona of its eccentric editor became central elements of his public identity.

His partnership with James Whitcomb Riley further expanded his audience by combining newspaper humor with poetry and public reading. Their tours demonstrated the continuing commercial importance of the lecture platform at a time when newspapers and illustrated books were also creating national literary celebrities.

William Sydney Porter, who later became known as O. Henry, was a young reporter in Houston when he wrote a tribute to Nye after his death. Porter described Nye as possessing "a child's heart, the scholar's knowledge and the philosopher's view of life."

== Selected works ==
The following list gives works attributed to Nye in approximately chronological order of first publication. Later editions and reissues often carried different publication dates. Many of these works may be read online at Project Gutenberg.

- Bill Nye and Boomerang; or, The Tale of a Meek-Eyed Mule, and Some Other Literary Gems (1881)
- Forty Liars and Other Lies (1882)
- Baled Hay: A Drier Book than Walt Whitman's "Leaves o' Grass" (1884)
- Bill Nye's Cordwood (1887)
- Bill Nye's Remarks (1887)
- Bill Nye's Chestnuts Old and New (1888)
- Bill Nye's Thinks (1888)
- Nye and Riley's Railway Guide (with James Whitcomb Riley) (1888)
- Bill Nye's Red Book (1891)
- Bill Nye's History of the United States (1894)
- Bill Nye's History of England from the Druids to the Reign of Henry VIII (1896)
- Bill Nye's Sparks (1896)
- A Guest at the Ludlow and Other Stories (1897, posthumous)
