= Linde Lee Jacobs =

American nurse and health advocate

- Education: Gustavus Adolphus College
- Occupations: Nurse, health advocate
- Known for: Frontotemporal dementia research advocacy
- Children: 2

Linde Lee Jacobs is an American nurse and advocate for frontotemporal dementia (FTD) research. She is a carrier of the MAPT gene mutation, which is associated with inherited FTD. Lee Jacobs has sought to support scientific research on tauopathies and improve care for those affected by FTD. In 2024, she co-founded Cure MAPT FTD, a nonprofit organization that facilitates connections among MAPT mutation carriers and supports clinical trial initiatives.

== Early life and education ==
Linde Lee Jacobs was raised in Eagan, Minnesota. She grew up in a household with her two sisters, where her mother, Allison McCormack Lee, worked as a physical therapist. Lee Jacobs’ family history included neurodegenerative disease; her grandmother had frontotemporal dementia (FTD), later confirmed as a tauopathy through autopsy.

Lee Jacobs worked as a personal care attendant before becoming a certified nursing assistant. She volunteered in a hospital and worked as an assistant in a pediatric oncology clinic before completing a B.S.N. at Gustavus Adolphus College. Her early adulthood was shaped by her dual responsibilities of starting her career while navigating her mother’s undiagnosed behavioral variant frontotemporal dementia (bvFTD).

== Career ==
Lee Jacobs began her career as a registered nurse while navigating her family’s experience with FTD. In 2019, her mother received a formal diagnosis of bvFTD linked to a mutation in the MAPT gene, which was later confirmed as hereditary. After genetic testing revealed she carried the same mutation, Lee Jacobs started contacting researchers to explore opportunities for treatment and research related to the disease.

Her initial outreach included contacting Claire Clelland, a neurologist at the University of California, San Francisco, whose work focused on gene-editing techniques and experimental drug testing for FTD. This collaboration marked the beginning of her direct involvement in research efforts. Lee Jacobs also connected with neurologist Kenneth S. Kosik, who invited her to present at the 2023 Tau Consortium meeting, where she shared her family's experiences with FTD and the impact of the MAPT mutation.

Lee Jacobs provided biological samples, including skin biopsies, which were used to generate induced pluripotent stem cells for studying the mutation and testing experimental therapies. She supports collaborations between research teams and advocating for increased availability of resources, including cell lines, for labs studying tauopathies.

In 2024, she co-founded Cure MAPT FTD, a nonprofit organization that facilitates connections among MAPT mutation carriers and supports clinical trial initiatives. By that year, the organization had identified over 500 individuals with confirmed or suspected MAPT mutations in ten countries.

Lee Jacobs has participated in public awareness campaigns, including World FTD Awareness Week, and engaged with scientific institutions such as the Wisconsin National Primate Research Center, where she observed preclinical research involving tauopathies. She has also worked to raise awareness among first responders and medical professionals about recognizing dementia-related behaviors based on her family’s experiences.

== Personal life ==
As of 2024, Lee Jacobs lives in River Falls, Wisconsin, with her husband and their two daughters.
