= Joel Foster =

American judge (1814-1885)

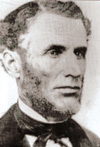
- Photograph of Judge Joel Foster, Owned by the family and on display at the Wisconsin Pierce County Historical Society.
- Born: 1814
- Died: 1885 (aged 70–71)
- Occupations: Farmer; judge; politician

Joel Foster (December 15, 1814 – August 9, 1885) was an American pioneer farmer, judge and local politician in River Falls, Wisconsin.

== Background ==
Foster was born the youngest of eleven at Meriden, Connecticut, December 15, 1814. He was liberally educated. He came to Alton, Illinois, in 1830 where he became the ferry master. In 1848 he traveled to what would become Hudson, Wisconsin, then only a few structures at the mouth of the Willow River.

After a careful exploration of the surrounding area he settled in the fall of 1848, at the junction of the two branches of the Kinnickinnic River, just upstream from its falls. His first winter was spent in a walled-in overhang cave below the falls of the river with "Dick" an orphan who had been indentured to the family. That same year they began building a small cabin known as Fort Foster.

Foster was the first white settler of River Falls, a city which grew at the location of the falls of the Kinnickinnic. He built the first dwelling house, raised the first crops, and helped many other pioneers getting started in that area. He filled many position of responsibility, including judge of St. Croix County, which at that time included what would become Pierce County. During the Mexican–American War he served as a quartermaster in Colonel William H. Bissell's Second Illinois Regiment.

Foster was married at Chicago in 1856 to Charlotte Porch.

== Politics and elective office ==
=== Election of 1849 ===
A meeting of the county board of supervisors for St. Croix County was held at the house of Philip Aldrich, June 4, 1849. It was voted at the meeting that the treasurer proceed against the persons elected to office in the several towns, also county, who failed to qualify at a meeting of the justices and clerk of county board of supervisors, September 17, 1849, to canvass the vote for county judge at the election held September 3. Ninety-one votes were canvassed, of which Hamlet H. Perkins received 49, Joel Foster 41, and Bailey F. Baldwin 1. Perkins, though elected to the office of county judge, died before filling the position, in consequence of his death by drowning during the winter following his election. Perkins was a lumberman, and had received the support of his class of people at the election. During the winter he broke through the ice while engaged on the river. Accordingly, Governor Nelson Dewey, governor of the state of Wisconsin, made out a commission with an appointment, and sent it at once to Foster, who had received the next largest number of votes at the previous election (by the support of the farmers), to come to Hudson, and take charge of the first court. Foster by this means obtained the office and continued to discharge its duties until the 1853 separation of Polk and Pierce counties from St. Croix.

=== American Civil War ===
Foster was known for his Copper Head Democrat political views and was often the subject of scorn by the local newspaper's Republican editor.

=== Legislature ===
In 1870, Foster was the Democratic nominee for the Pierce County Wisconsin State Assembly seat against Republican incumbent Oliver S. Powell. He lost to Powell, with 413 votes to Powell's 902.

== Death ==
On August 9, 1885, Foster died at his home in town after being gored by a dairy bull on his farm. Foster was first buried in Foster's Cemetery, and then later his daughter Eunice Foster had him reintured at the Greenwood Cemetery in River Falls.
