= Frank Nye =

American politician (1852–1935)

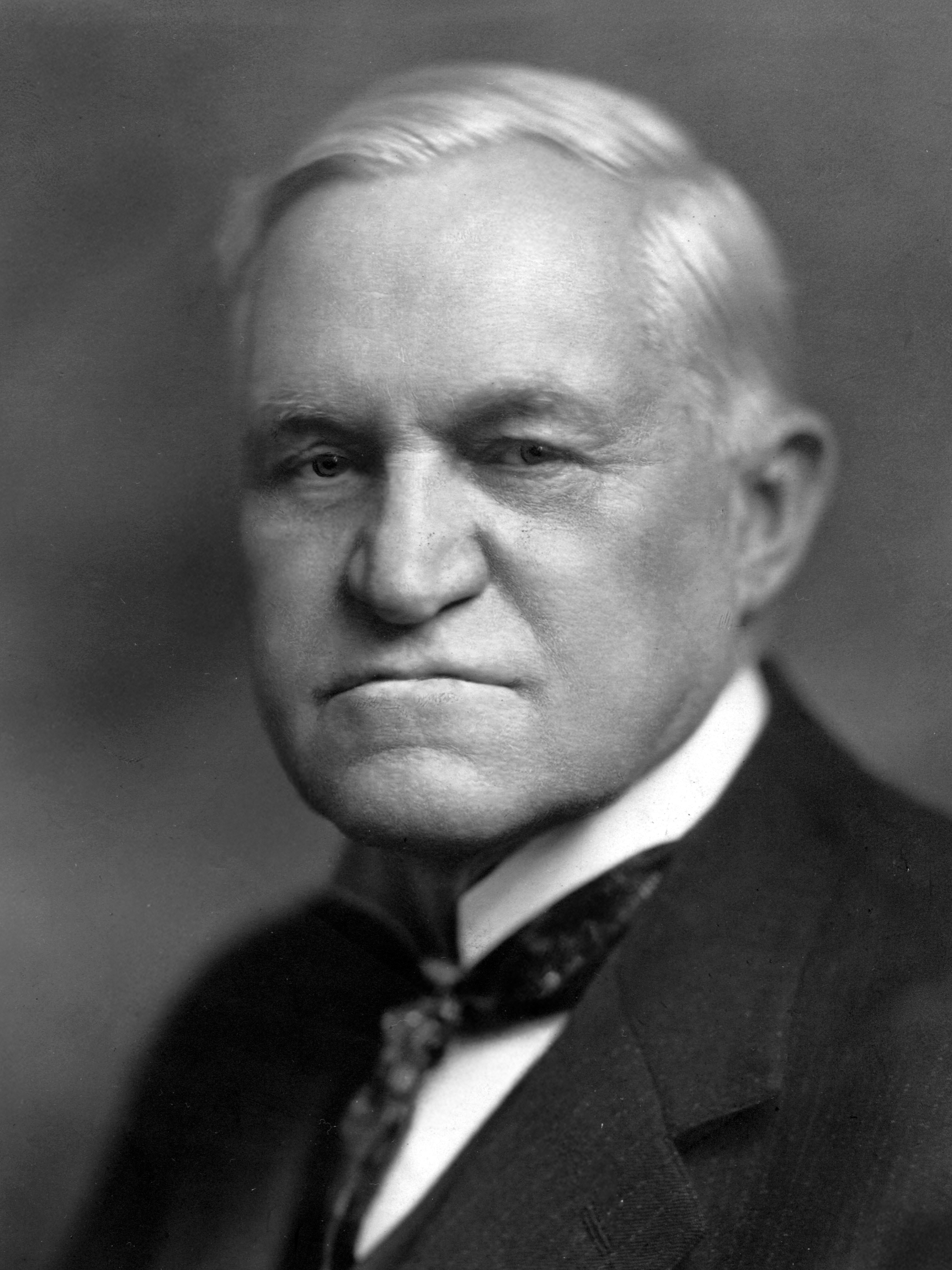

Member of the U.S. House of Representatives from Minnesota's 5th district
- In office March 4, 1907 – March 3, 1913
- Preceded by: Loren Fletcher
- Succeeded by: George Ross Smith

Personal details
- Born: March 7, 1862 Shirley, Maine, U.S.
- Died: November 29, 1935 (aged 73) Minneapolis, Minnesota, U.S
- Party: Republican

Frank Mellen Nye (March 7, 1852 – November 29, 1935) was a representative from Minnesota.

== Early life and education ==
Born in Shirley, Piscataquis County, Maine; moved to Wisconsin with his parents, who settled on a farm near River Falls, Pierce County, in 1855; attended the common schools and the local academy in River Falls.

== Career ==
He taught school for several years and then studied law; as admitted to the bar in 1878 and commenced practice in Hudson, Wisconsin; district attorney of Polk County, Wisconsin, 1879 – 1884; member of the Wisconsin State Assembly in 1884 and 1885; moved to Minnesota in 1886, settled in Minneapolis, and continued the practice of law; assistant prosecuting attorney of Hennepin County; prosecuting attorney 1893 – 1897; elected as a Republican to the Sixtieth, Sixty-first, and Sixty-second congresses (March 4, 1907 – March 3, 1913); declined to be a candidate for renomination in 1912; resumed the practice of his profession in Minneapolis; elected in 1920 judge of the district court of Hennepin County for a six-year term; reelected in 1926 and served until his retirement in 1932; died in Minneapolis, November 29, 1935; interment in Greenwood Cemetery, River Falls, Wisconsin.

U.S. House of Representatives
Preceded by Loren Fletcher	U.S. Representative from Minnesota's 5th congressional district 1907 – 1913	Succeeded by George Ross Smith
