= Kevin Black (wrestling coach) =

Wrestling coach

- Weight: 133 lb (60 kg)
- Born: September 25, 1979 (age 46); River Falls, Wisconsin, U.S.
- High school: River Falls (WI) River Falls
- State championships: 4 (Wisconsin)
- College: University of Wisconsin
- Status: Head Coach for River Falls High School, Owner of Victory School of Wrestling

Kevin James Black (born September 25, 1979) is a wrestling coach, the founder and former owner of the Victory School of Wrestling. Kevin is the former head coach for the River Falls High School wrestling team, and a former standout wrestler for the state of Wisconsin.

Kevin has provided significant coaching for women/female wrestlers competing internationally. Kevin was mat side coaching Helen Maroulis to an Olympic Gold Medal at the 2016 Olympics in Rio de Janeiro.

== Career ==
=== High school ===
Kevin won four individual high school state titles at River Falls High School with a 160-0 career record. During high school, he also won four freestyle state titles and three Greco-Roman titles. In 1998 he was an ASICS Tiger and an Amateur Wrestling News and Wrestling USA All-American honorable mention. Black holds RFHS records for most career wins (160), highest career win percentage (100%), Career pins (101), Career takedowns (589), and career team points (1,103.5).

=== College ===
After graduation from River Falls High in 1998, Black wrestled at the University of Wisconsin-Madison (UW). During his Junior season Black was named an All-American after placing 4th at the NCAA tournament. His senior season was cut short due to injury. He was a team captain for three of his four years at Wisconsin.

== Coaching career ==
Black is the former head coach at River Falls High School, stepping down after the 2022-23 season. He began his coaching career in college, running Black Bros Wrestling Camps with his brother Tony. They were the Wisconsin Wrestling Federation Co-State Coaches in 2003–05. Black also spent one season as an assistant high school wrestling coach in Lodi, WI. Black also spent two years on the coaching staff at the University of Wisconsin. Black has been a World Team coach in 2007 (Baku, Azerbaijan), 2009 (Herning, Denmark) and 2011 (Istanbul, Turkey) and has led on many international tours with USA Wrestling. He has also been a part of the Olympic Development Program since 2007 and was a club coach with the New York AC, which won the women's team title at the 2009 U.S. National Championships. Black coached at River Falls High School from 2013 to 2023.

== Victory School of Wrestling ==
In 2010 Black created the Victory School of Wrestling. Its mission statement notes that: "Victory School of Wrestling aims to build championship wrestlers with championship character, tremendous work ethic, high morality and integrity." At Victory, Black has been a part of developing over 30 high school state champions, 39 USAW All-Americans and 7 World Team/US National Team members.

== Awards and honors ==
- Black was undefeated in high school wrestling, posting a 160-0 career record.
- In college he was an All-American.
- In 2009 and 2011, Black was named USA Wrestling Women's Coach of the Year.

== Personal life ==
Black is married to Liz (Reusser) Black, a WCCCA Hall of Fame inductee and cross country star at Middleton High School and University of Wisconsin. They have three children.
