= Kinikinik Lake =

Lake in Alberta, Canada

- Location within Alberta
- Location: Athabasca County, Alberta
- Coordinates: 54°35′N 113°01′W
- Basin countries: Canada
- Surface elevation: 614 m (2,014 ft)

Kinikinik Lake is located in central Alberta, Canada, north of the provincial capital, Edmonton. It is approximately 614 meters above sea level.

The name of this lake is a palindrome.
