= Kinnickinnic State Park =

State park in Pierce County, Wisconsin

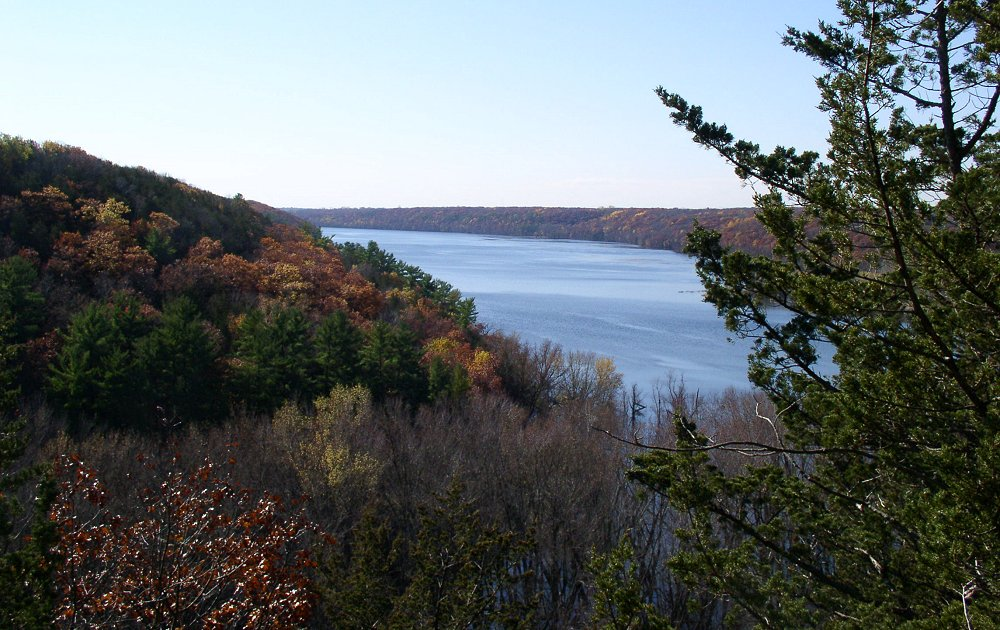
- The mouth of the Kinnickinnic River at the St. Croix River.

- Location within Wisconsin Location within the United States
- Interactive map of Kinnickinnic State Park
- Location: Pierce County, Wisconsin, United States
- Coordinates: 44°49′48″N 92°45′1″W
- Area: 1,242 acres (503 ha)
- Established: 1972
- Administrator: Wisconsin Department of Natural Resources
- Website: Official website
- Wisconsin State Parks

Kinnickinnic State Park is a 1,242-acre (503 ha) Wisconsin state park in which the Kinnickinnic River, locally known as Kinni River, joins the St. Croix River. The mouth of the Kinnickinnic River forms a sandy delta upon which boaters can picnic and camp.

== Flora and fauna ==
The banks of the Kinnickinnic River are lined with Weymouth pine trees. River is rich with trout.

More than 140 species of birds, such as anseriformes, visit the Kinnickinnic Valley during the bird migration. In the summer months, the number drops to 85 to 90 species, namely pheasants and grey partridges. In addition, there are also bald eagles in the winter months. In 1989, wild turkeys were resettled to the state park.

The mammal wildlife that frequent Kinnickinnic State Park include various species of white-tailed deer, raccoons, American minks, red and gray fox, red squirrel, rabbit, weasel and North American beaver.
