= Dakota State Trojans men's basketball =

2025–26 Dakota State Trojans men's basketball team
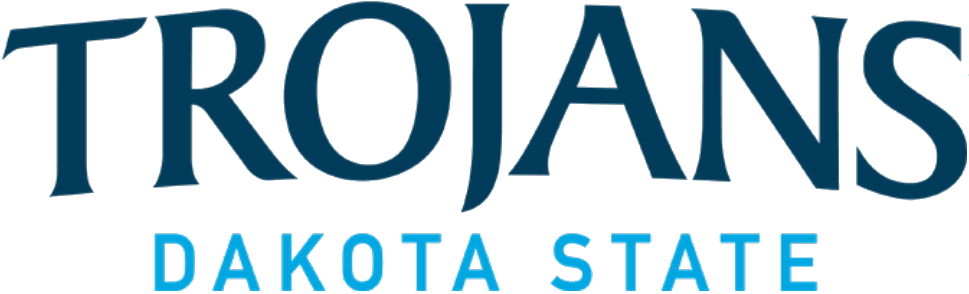
- University: Dakota State University
- First season: 1911
- Athletic director: Bud Postma
- Head coach: Kevin Williamson (1st season)
- Location: Madison, South Dakota
- Arena: DSU Fieldhouse
- Conference: Frontier Conference
- Nickname: Trojans
- Colors: Trojan blue, DSU blue, and gray

NAIA tournament appearances
- 1992, 2012, 2013, 2015, 2016

Conference tournament champions
- 2012, 2013, 2015, 2016

Conference regular-season champions
- 1967, 2015, 2016

The Dakota State Trojans men's basketball team represents Dakota State University, competing as a member of the North Star Athletic Association (NSAA) in the National Association of Intercollegiate Athletics (NAIA). During the 2025–26 academic year, the Trojans will be moving to the Frontier Conference. The Trojans play their home games at the DSU Fieldhouse in Madison, South Dakota. Their current head coach is Kevin Williamson.

== History ==
=== Conference affiliations ===
- South Dakota Intercollegiate Conference (1917–2000)
- Dakota Athletic Conference (2000–2011)
- NAIA independent (2011–2013)
- North Star Athletic Association (2013–2025)
- Frontier Conference (2025–present)

== Conference championships ==
The Trojans have won 3 regular season championships and 4 conference tournament championships.

South Dakota Intercollegiate Conference

- Regular Season Champion (1 time): 1967

Association of Independent Institutions

- Conference tournament champion (2 times): 2012, 2013

North Star Athletic Association

- Regular Season Champion (2 times): 2015, 2016
- Conference tournament champion (2 times): 2015, 2016

== Postseason ==
=== NAIA tournament results ===
Dakota State has appeared in the NAIA tournament 5 times. Their combined record is 5–5.

Year	Round	Opponent	Result
1992	First Round; Second Round; Quarterfinals; Semifinals	Edgewood; King; William Jewell; Northwestern	W 86–70; W 92–79; W 83–77; L 68–91
2012	First Round	McPherson	L 63–69
2013	First Round; Second Round; Quarterfinals	Warner Pacific; St. Thomas; Grace	W 89–80; W 61–60; L 59–72
2015	First Round	College of Idaho	L 64–65
2016	First Round	Saint Francis	L 81–96

=== Frontier tournament results ===
Dakota State has appeared in the Frontier Conference tournament once. Their combined record is 0–1.

Year	Seed	Round	Opponent	Result
2026	6	Quarterfinals	Carroll	L 81–87

=== NSAA tournament results ===
Dakota State has appeared in the NSAA tournament 12 times. Their combined record is 13–10

Tournament Champions

Year	Seed	Round	Opponent	Result
2014	2	Semifinals; Championship	Valley City State; Jamestown	W 74–56; L 67–72
2015	2	Quarterfinals; Semifinals; Championship	Dickinson State; Mayville State; Jamestown	W 85–74; W 75–57; W 66–65
2016	3	Quarterfinals; Semifinals; Championship	Waldorf; Mayville State; Jamestown	W 101–84; W 84–72; W 79–65
2017	5	Quarterfinals; Semifinals	Viterbo; Bellevue	W 56–52; L 62–69
2018	6	Quarterfinals	Dickinson State	L 59–79
2019	7	Quarterfinals	Presentation	L 67–79
2020	7	Quarterfinals	Mayville State	L 59–74
2021	5	Quarterfinals; Semifinals; Championship	Viterbo; Mayville State; Bellevue	W 95–88; W 66–65; L 57–63
2022	5	Quarterfinals; Semifinals	Mayville State; Viterbo	W 74–68; L 73–75
2023	6	Quarterfinals	Dickinson State	L 60–72
2024	4	Quarterfinals; Semifinals	Viterbo; Bellevue	W 85–61; L 66–70
2025	6	Quarterfinals; Semifinals	Mayville State; Jamestown	W 86–75; L 69–76

== Coaches ==
=== Current Coaching Staff ===
Position	Name	Alma mater
Head Coach	Kevin Williamson	University of Providence
Graduate Assistant	Matthew Vargas	
Graduate Assistant	Tampa Scott IV	Dakota Wesleyan University
Student Assistant	Elijah Allen	
Student Assistant	Luke Vargas	

== Arenas ==
- DSU Fieldhouse (1957–present)

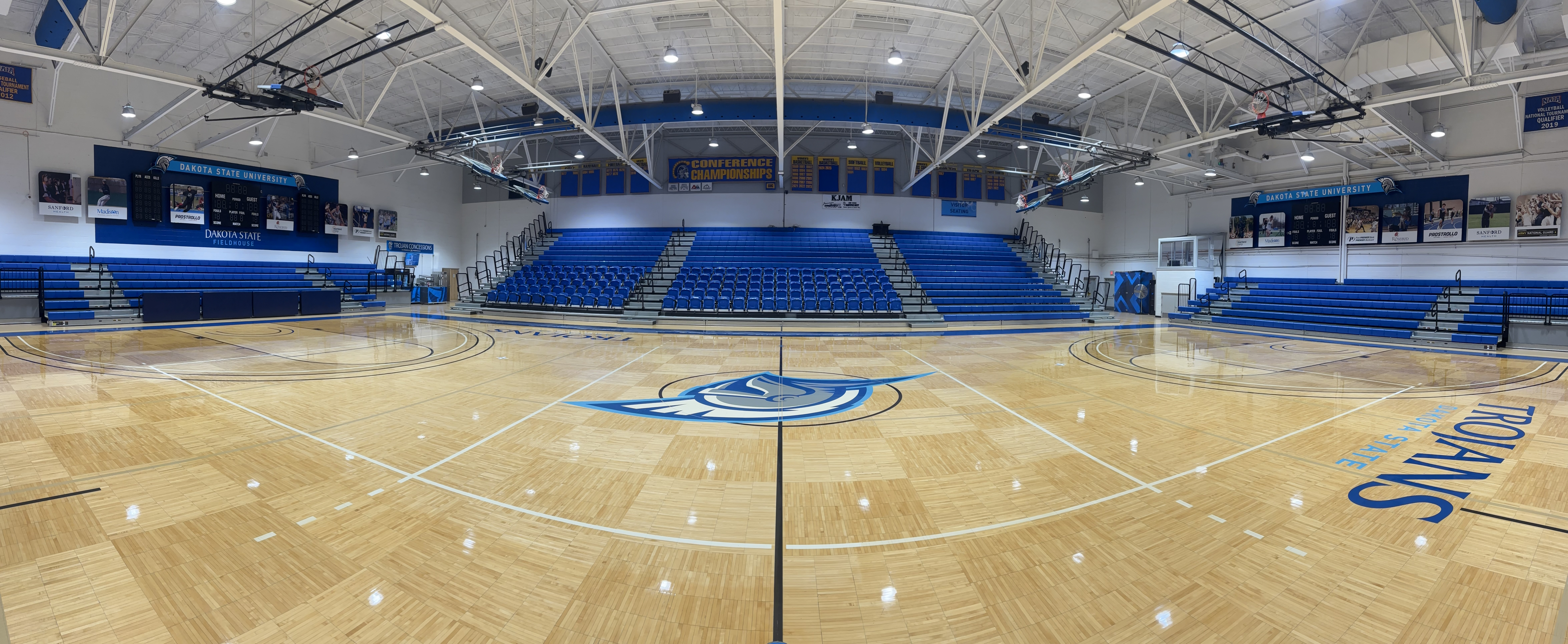
The Trojans play their home games at the DSU Fieldhouse

== Individual awards and honors ==
=== All-Americans ===
==== NAIA ====
Year	Player
1967	Myron Moen
1973	Cliff Anderson
1991	Brett Schwartz
2000	Jason Smidt
2005	Sal Raphael
2007	Joe Backus
2008	Joe Backus
2013	Luke Lamb
2014	Dylan Hale
2015	Bryant Allen
2016	Kyle Kilgore
2019	Justin Folkers

=== SDIC honors ===
All-Conference

- George Gregerson (1930)
- Oxy Oxwan (1930)
- "Archie" Turner (1930)
- LeMar Nelson (1954)
- Maury Poppen (1956-57)
- Dick Miller (1958)
- Jerry Manthey (1959)
- Gene Appelwick (1960)
- Leroy Debeer (1963)
- Myron Moen (1965-68)
- Simon Schloe (1967-68)
- Cliff Anderson (1971-73)
- Mike Peterreins (1973-76)
- Warren Quail (1975)
- Randy Schaefer (1982-83)
- Tim Asche (1983-85)
- Todd Cavanaugh (1984-85)
- Brian Kearn (1985-86)
- Brett Schwartz (1988-91)
- Fred Fleming (1990)
- Rob Grady (1991)
- Earnest Monette (1992)
- Keith Carter (1993)
- Floyd Johnson (1993)
- Jason Smidt (1999-2000)
- Scot Namanny (1999)

=== DAC honors ===
All-Conference

- Scot Namanny (2001)
- J.F. Jensen (2003)
- Sal Raphael (2005)
- Ryan Burggraff (2005)
- Joe Backus (2006-08)
- Mike Larsen (2011)

=== NSAA honors ===
First team All-NSAA

- Dylan Hale (2014)
- Yusuf Vinson (2014)
- Bryant Allen (2015)
- Kyle Kilgore (2016-17)
- Tanner Heiser (2017)
- Justin Folkers (2019)
- Lamarr Wood (2022)

Second team All-NSAA

- Miguel Sansavour (2014)
- Derek Meger (2015)
- Tanner Heiser (2016)
- Justin Folkers (2018)
- Josh McGreal (2020)
- Ronnie Latting (2022)
- Sam Muller (2023)
- Mison Coilton (2024)

Honorable mention All-NSAA

- Kevin Daniels (2018)
- Ronnie Latting (2021)
- Brayden Pankonin (2025)

=== Frontier honors ===
First team All–Frontier

- Nathan Ojukwu (2026)
- Lukas Morgan (2026)
