= Kinnickinnic River (St. Croix River tributary) =

River in Wisconsin, United States

Coordinates: 44.8311°N 92.7691°W

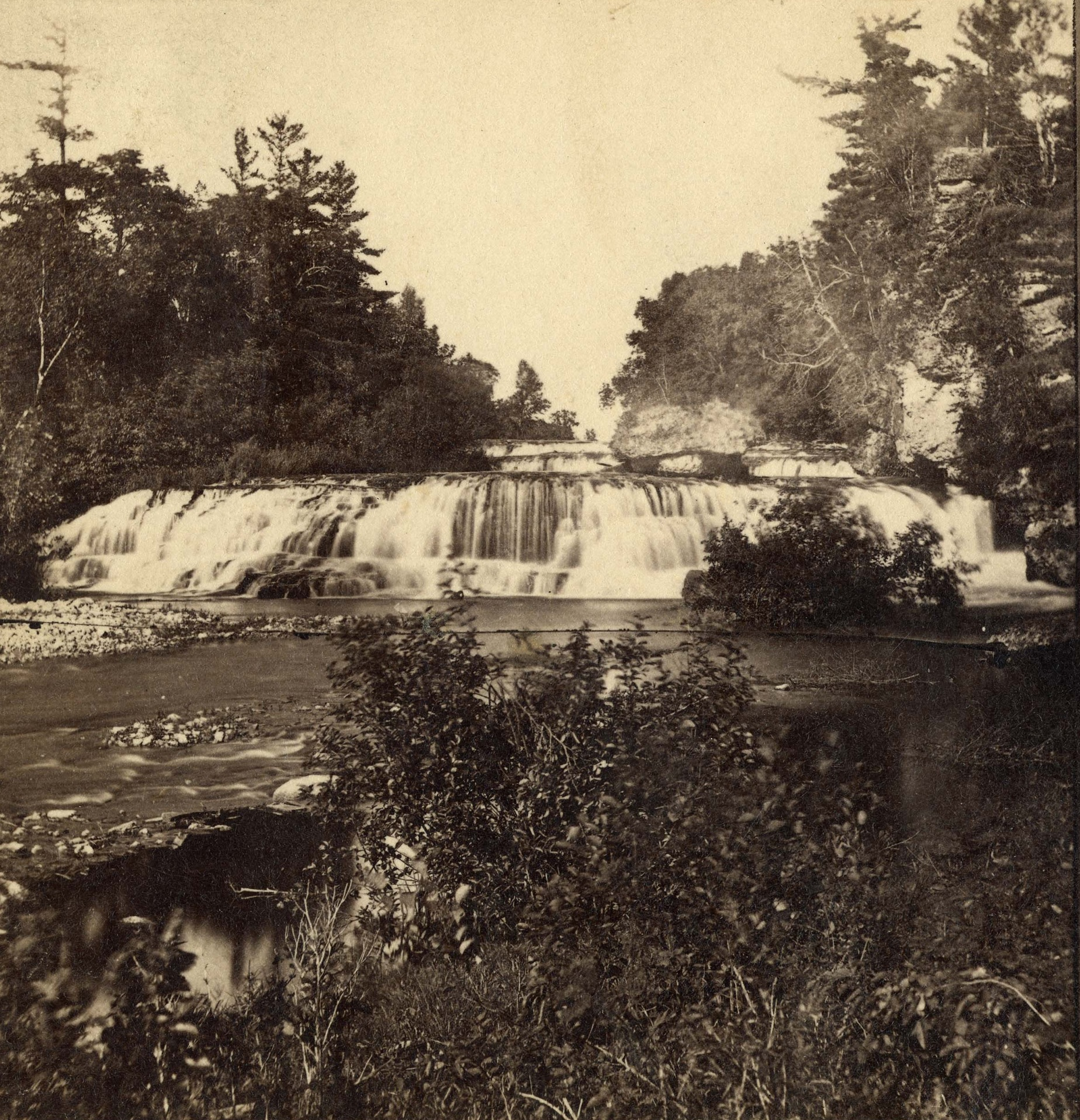
The historic Junction Falls of the Kinnickinnic River in River Falls, Wisconsin prior to the construction of any dam in the Kinnickinnic River. This photograph was originally taken by John Carbutt between 1864 - 1865 and published as a stereoview in a set of scenery pictures of "The Upper Mississippi, Minnesota and the Vicinity".

The Upper "Junction Falls" Dam on the Kinnickinnic River in River Falls, Wisconsin as it appears today. The Historic Junction Falls are obscured by its presence, sitting below the flat waters of the impoundment above the dam. The lowest ledge of the Junction Falls now sits as the dry ledge below the base of the dam, with the water being diverted through the 200' long penstock of the hydroelectric project and coming out of the power house on the left rather than cascading over the falls. The boulder that historically sat on top of the ledge, known as "Eagle Rock" has been dislodged by flood waters and now sits below the ledge on the right side of the picture.

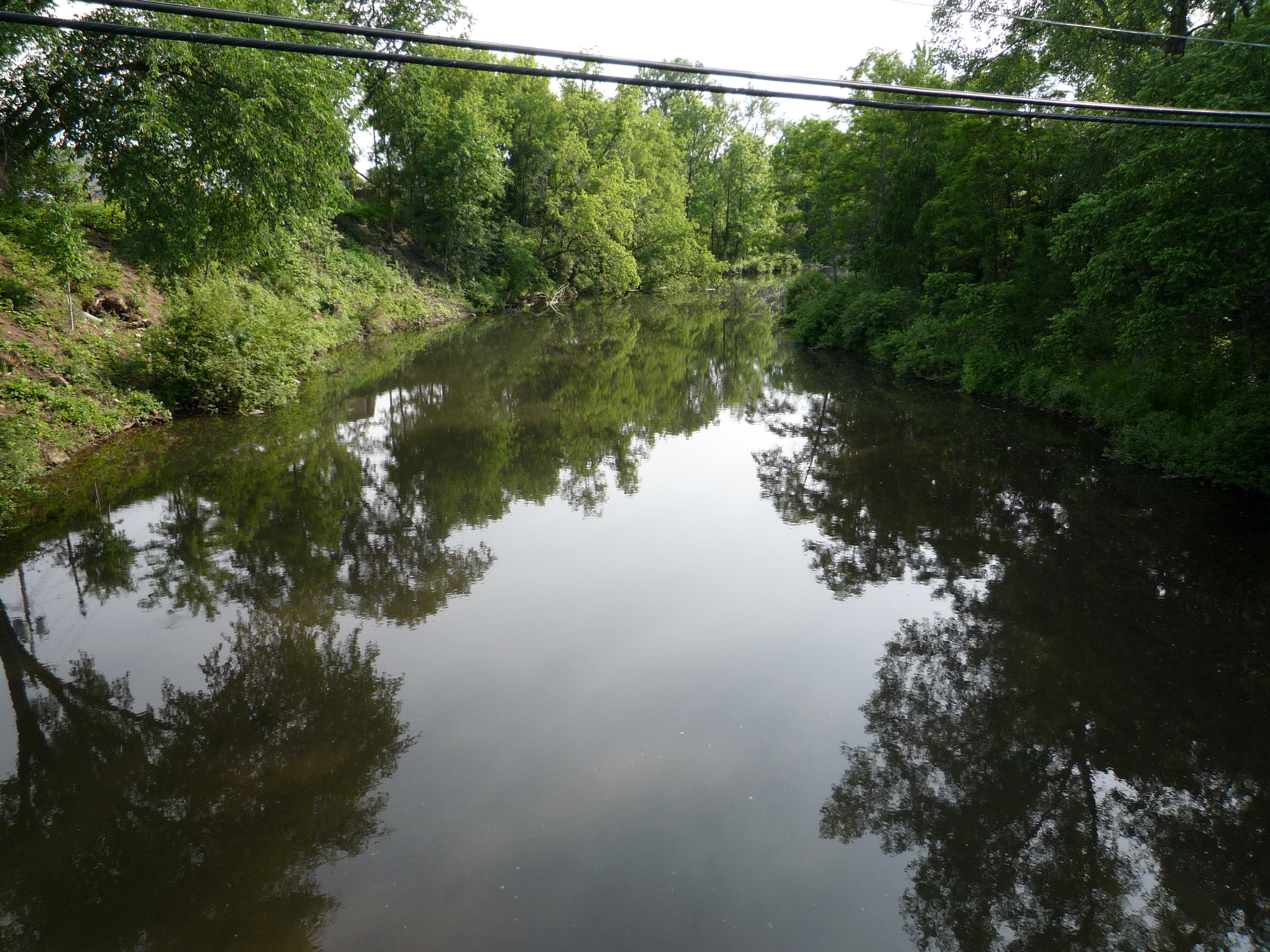
The Kinnickinnic River as it passes through downtown River Falls showing the effect of the upper dam with the stagnant flow of the river.

The Kinnickinnic River, called the Kinni for short, is a 22-mile-long (35 km) river in northwestern Wisconsin in the United States. The Kinni is a cold water fishery supporting a population of native Brook Trout and naturally reproducing Brown Trout.

== Designations ==
The Kinnickinnic River is officially designated as a Class I trout stream by the WI DNR, indicating it is a "high quality" trout water that has sufficient natural reproduction to sustain populations of wild trout, at or near carrying capacity. The Kinnickinnic is also designated as an Outstanding Resource Water (ORW) by the WI DNR both above State HWY 35, and below the Powell Falls Dam, however, the stretch of the Kinni through the City of River Falls is not included in this designation where the river is impounded into two reservoirs which do not support a fishery. This ORW designation indicates the Kinni provides outstanding recreational opportunities, supports valuable fisheries and wildlife habitat, has good water quality, and is not significantly impacted by human activities. This designation indicates that the State of Wisconsin has determined the Kinnickinnic River warrants additional protection from the effects of pollution. These designations are intended to meet federal Clean Water Act obligations requiring Wisconsin to adopt an “antidegradation” policy that is designed to prevent any lowering of water quality – especially in those waters having significant ecological or cultural value.

== Name ==
The city of River Falls, Wisconsin, which was named after the historic Junction Falls waterfall on the Kinnickinnic River, is situated on the river where the main branch of the Kinnickinnic River and the South Fork of the Kinnickinnic River have their confluence. The name Kinnickinnic is a word from the Ojibwe giniginige, and refers to tobacco mixed with other plant material for smoking.

== History ==
The first settler of European descent along the Kinnickinnic River was Judge Joel Foster. He first settled in the area over the winter of 1848-1849 in a walled-in cave overhang at the confluence of the main channel and the South Fork of the Kinnickinnic River. Foster wrote about the two Native American tribes inhabiting the region—the Sioux and the Chippewa. He noted that both placed such value on the St. Croix River Valley that neither claimed it for themselves. Two brothers, Nathaniel N. and Oliver Stanley Powell, also claimed land in the vicinity in 1849. They built the first commercial structure in the City of River Falls in 1852 along the banks of the Kinnickinnic River. Foster built a sawmill and dam in 1854 which was later expanded to include a feed store and was located on the south bank of the Kinnickinnic River. Later that year, the firm of Crossman & Hart constructed a brickyard on the southern edge of the growing community along the Kinnickinnic. Four flour mills with dams in the Kinnickinnic River were established in the City of River Falls. The first was built in 1855 by C.B. Cox, who later built another mill known as the Prairie Mill, located on the west side of North Main Street.

== Geography ==
The Kinnickinnic River rises from springs in St. Croix County and flows in a southwesterly direction before emptying into the St. Croix River in Kinnickinnic State Park. The Kinnickinnic is composed of two types of river. Above River Falls, the river flows slowly, with a sandy/silty bottom and a narrower bed. Below River Falls, the bed is wider and is generally composed of stone rather than sand or silt. A substantial amount of silt and sand are deposited in the delta, enough that that section of the St. Croix is known as the "Kinnickinnic Narrows." The water is slightly colder above the City of River Falls than below by about 4.5 degrees Fahrenheit. The difference in water temperature is possibly due to the two hydroelectric dams remaining in the river and their impoundments, both of which are silted in to very shallow depths, allowing the river water to stagnate and warm prior to continuing downstream. Both impoundments also experience extreme eutrophication during the warm summer months leading to significant algae blooms.

The differences in the stream make for differences in the fish population. The upper section of the river contains very high numbers of trout that are of smaller size. The warmer water below River Falls supports more minnow and crustacean life, which can support larger trout, though in fewer numbers. The extreme case of this is near the delta, where the water becomes even warmer, and the river supports warmer-water species such as smallmouth bass.

The Kinni watershed is characterized by scenic bluff lands, rare oak savanna, original prairie, farm land, white pine forest, wooded coulees, sedge meadows, rare and endangered plant species, beautiful stands of white pines and plenty of open space and scenic vistas. Its feeder creeks are cold and clean, containing wild native brook trout, important spawning areas, wetlands, and many springs arising from under picturesque limestone outcroppings.

== Dams ==
The River Falls Municipal Utility owns and operates the Powell and Junction Falls dams as a hydroelectric project licensed by the Federal Energy Regulatory Commission under docket #P-10489. In February 2018, the River Falls city council unanimously approved a plan to decommission and remove the dams. The plan as passed has a target date of 2026 for removal of the Powell Dam, and a target date range of 2035 to 2040 for removal of the Junction Falls Dam.

== Recreation ==
The main recreational opportunity on the upper portions of the Kinnickinnic River is trout fishing. Nearer to River Falls downtown, walking, hiking, running, mountain biking along the trails beginning in Heritage Park and continuing across the swinging bridge and connecting to extensive trails below the lower dam in River Falls is a major attraction. The City is also a Bird City and attracts a number of birders along the river. Kayaking along the lower stretches of the river has become popular, with three businesses shuttling kayakers to the launch point below the lower dam and picking them up at the takeout at the County F bridge near Kinnickinnic State Park. Local s also launch kayaks north of the City at several points and take out in Heritage Park just before the upper dam.

Access is limited on the stretch of the Kinnickinnic River below the City of River Falls. Public access on the lower river is mainly gained at three spots immediately downstream from the Glen Park dam within the River Hills neighborhood, and downstream from the County Highway F bridge at Kinnickinnic State Park two miles above the mouth of the river.
