= Towner =

Towner can refer to:

== People ==
=== Surname ===
- Daniel B. Towner (1850–1919), American hymn composer
- Donald Chisholm Towner (1903–1985), British art collector and historian
- Edgar Towner (1890–1972), Australian recipient of the Victoria Cross
- Elwood Towner (c. 1897–1954), Native American attorney and pro-Nazi speaker
- Eric Towner, American producer, writer, director and animator
- Henry Bingham Towner (1909–1997), English architect
- Horace M. Towner (1855–1937), American politician and governor of Puerto Rico
- James E. Towner (1851–1935), American politician
- Jay Ferdinand Towner (1910–1933), American whose cause of death is a mystery
- John Towner (1933–2023), Australian rules footballer
- Margaret Towner (born 1925), American religious leader, first woman to be ordained a minister of the Presbyterian Church in the United States of America
- Margaret Towner (actress) (1920–2017), British actress
- Philip H. Towner (born 1953), biblical scholar
- Ralph Towner (1940–2026), American multi-instrumentalist, composer and bandleader
- Tony Towner (born 1955), English former footballer
- William T. Towner (1869–1950), American architect

=== Given name ===
- Towner K. Webster (1849–1922), American industrialist and businessman

== Places in the United States ==
- Towner, Colorado, a census-designated place
- Towner, North Dakota, a city and the seat of McHenry County
- Towner County, North Dakota

== Other uses ==
- Kia Towner, a variation of the small van Daihatsu Hijet
- USS Towner, an attack cargo ship
- Towner's station, a New York Central Railroad station
- Colorado Pacific Railroad, sometimes called the Towner Line or Towner Railroad
- Towner Gallery
- "Towner", a song from the 1996 album Telephono by Spoon
