= New Richmond, Wisconsin =

- City
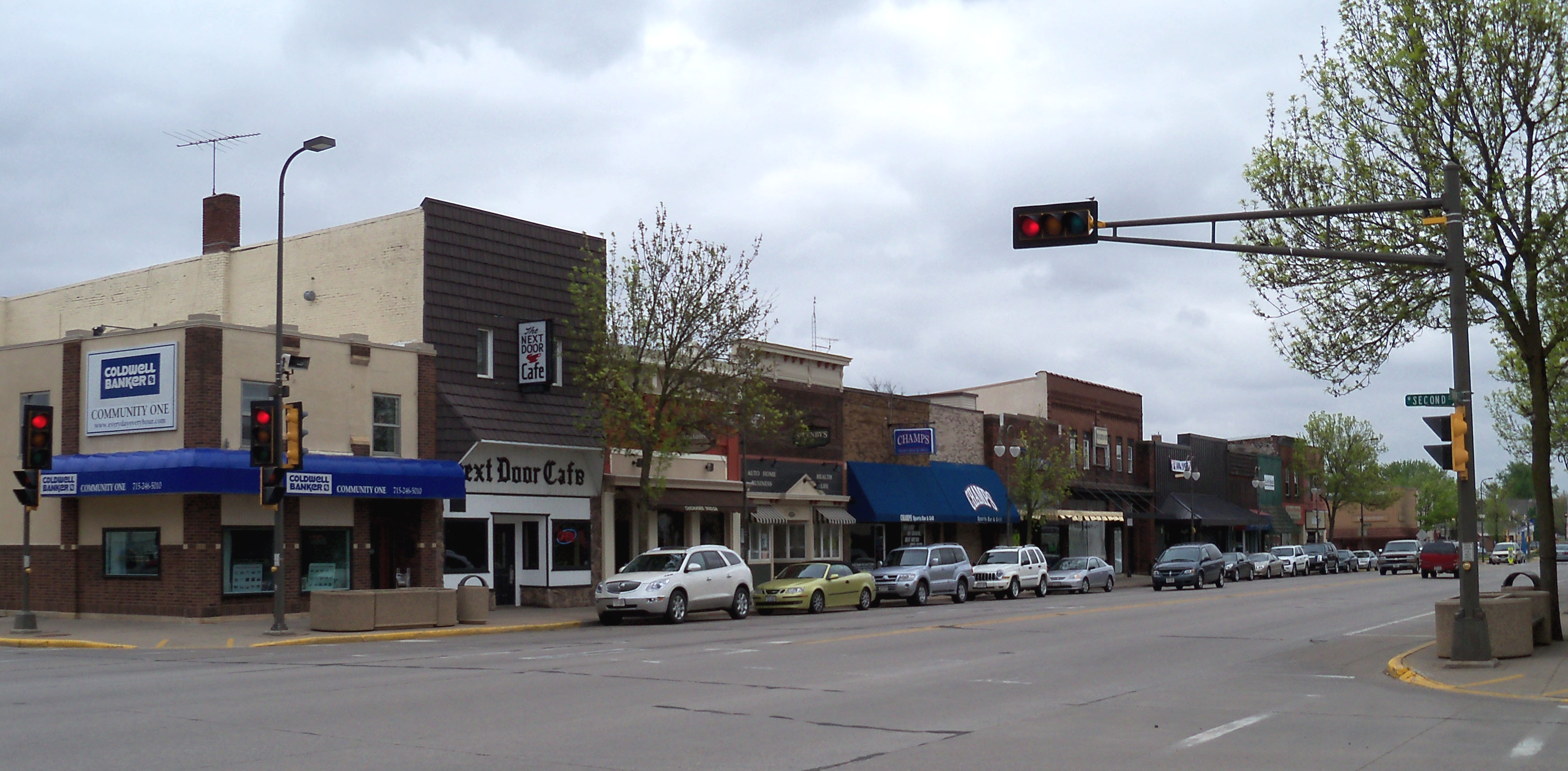
- Downtown New Richmond
- Motto: The City Beautiful
- Interactive map of New Richmond, Wisconsin
- Location within Wisconsin Location within the United States
- Coordinates: 45°7′11″N 92°32′21″W
- Country: United States
- State: Wisconsin
- County: St. Croix

Government
  - Type: Mayor–council
  - Mayor: James Zajkowski

Area
  - Total: 11.04 sq mi (28.60 km^{2})
  - Land: 10.79 sq mi (27.94 km^{2})
  - Water: 0.25 sq mi (0.66 km^{2})
- Elevation: 981 ft (299 m)

Population (2020)
  - Total: 10,079
  - Density: 912.9/sq mi (352.49/km^{2})
- Time zone: UTC-6 (Central (CST))
  - Summer (DST): UTC-5 (CDT)
- Area codes: 715 & 534
- FIPS code: 55-57100
- GNIS feature ID: 1581681
- Website: https://www.newrichmondwi.gov/

New Richmond is a city in St. Croix County, Wisconsin, United States. The population was 10,079 at the 2020 census.

== History ==
New Richmond was founded in 1857. The first permanent settlement was established by Hiram Foster, who had led a group of settlers from Vermont into the area in search of virgin Wisconsin timber for harvesting. Foster built and operated a sawmill on the banks of the Willow River, which gradually drew more settlers from New England into the area. For the first few years the settlement was called Foster's Crossing, and was later renamed after Richmond Day, the land surveyor who plotted the town. Because another town in Wisconsin had already taken the name Richmond, it was decided to call the town New Richmond.

In 1871, New Richmond was made a station on the southwestern branch of Chicago, St. Paul, Minneapolis and Omaha Railway's 'Omaha X' network, initially working northwards from Hudson to New Richmond and providing a direct connection to Saint Paul, Minnesota. Construction on the line continued northeast of New Richmond, reaching Spooner, Wisconsin in 1879. In addition to a steady stream of newcomers from New England, New Richmond saw an influx of Irish immigrants throughout the 1870s and early 1880s, later followed by large numbers of Germans, Norwegians and a few Swedes throughout the 1880s and 1890s. In 1885, the Wisconsin Central Railroad built a line into the north side of town westward from Chippewa Falls, from where it later continued towards Stillwater and on to Saint Paul.

On the early evening of June 12, 1899, a deadly tornado tore through St. Croix, Polk and Barron counties along a 46-mile path. While most of the F5-strength storm's path was confined to rural areas, New Richmond suffered a direct hit, with half the town's residences leveled as well as the entire business district. In all, the tornado killed 117 people, 111 at New Richmond alone, injured more than 125, left over 1,500 people homeless and caused an estimated $18 million in damage. Due to state and federal aid and a large amount of donations, most of the homes and all but two of the businesses destroyed in the storm were able to rebuild by the following winter. As of 2013, the tornado ranked as the deadliest ever recorded in Wisconsin and the ninth deadliest tornado in American history. Most of Main Street (Knowles Avenue) was rebuilt within five months.

== Geography ==
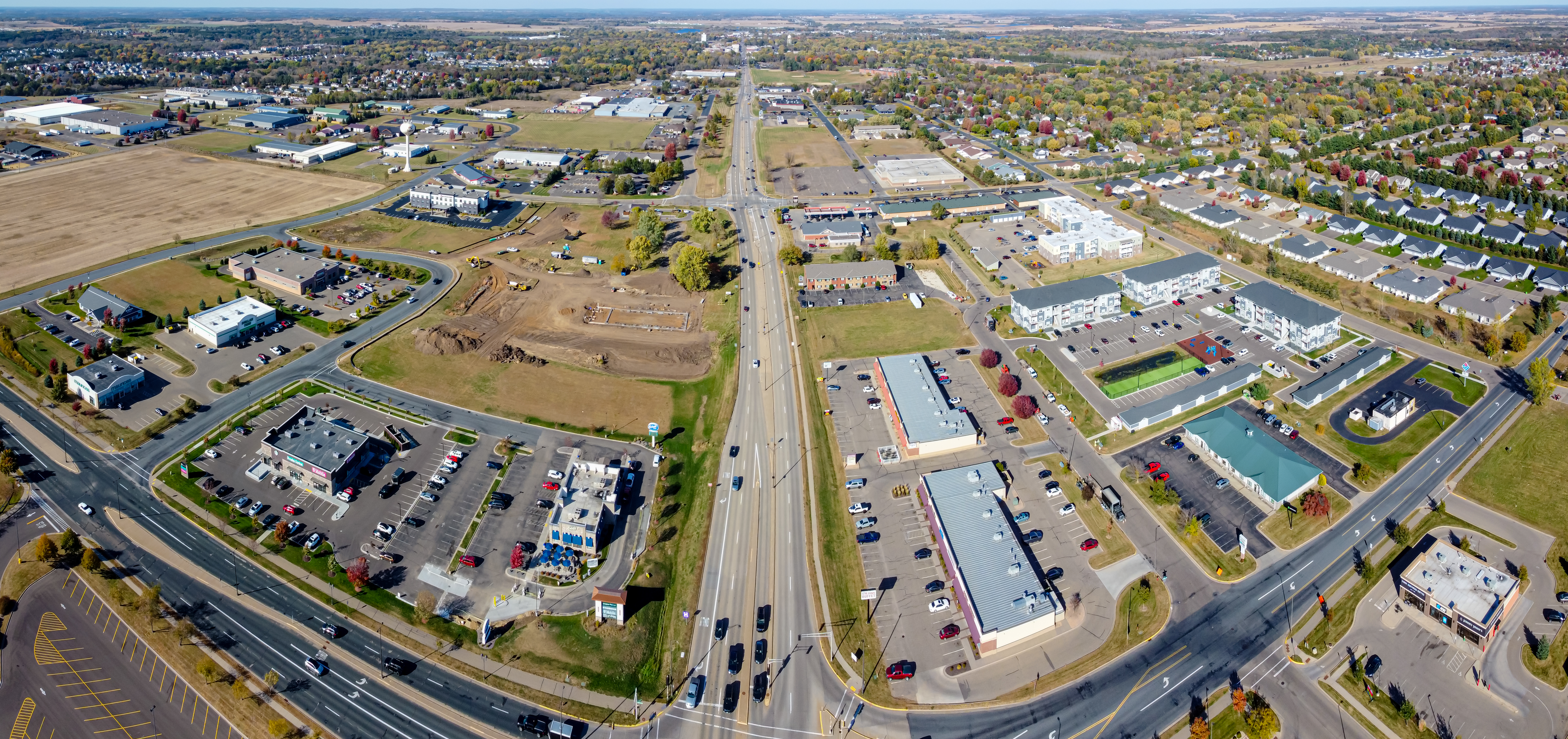

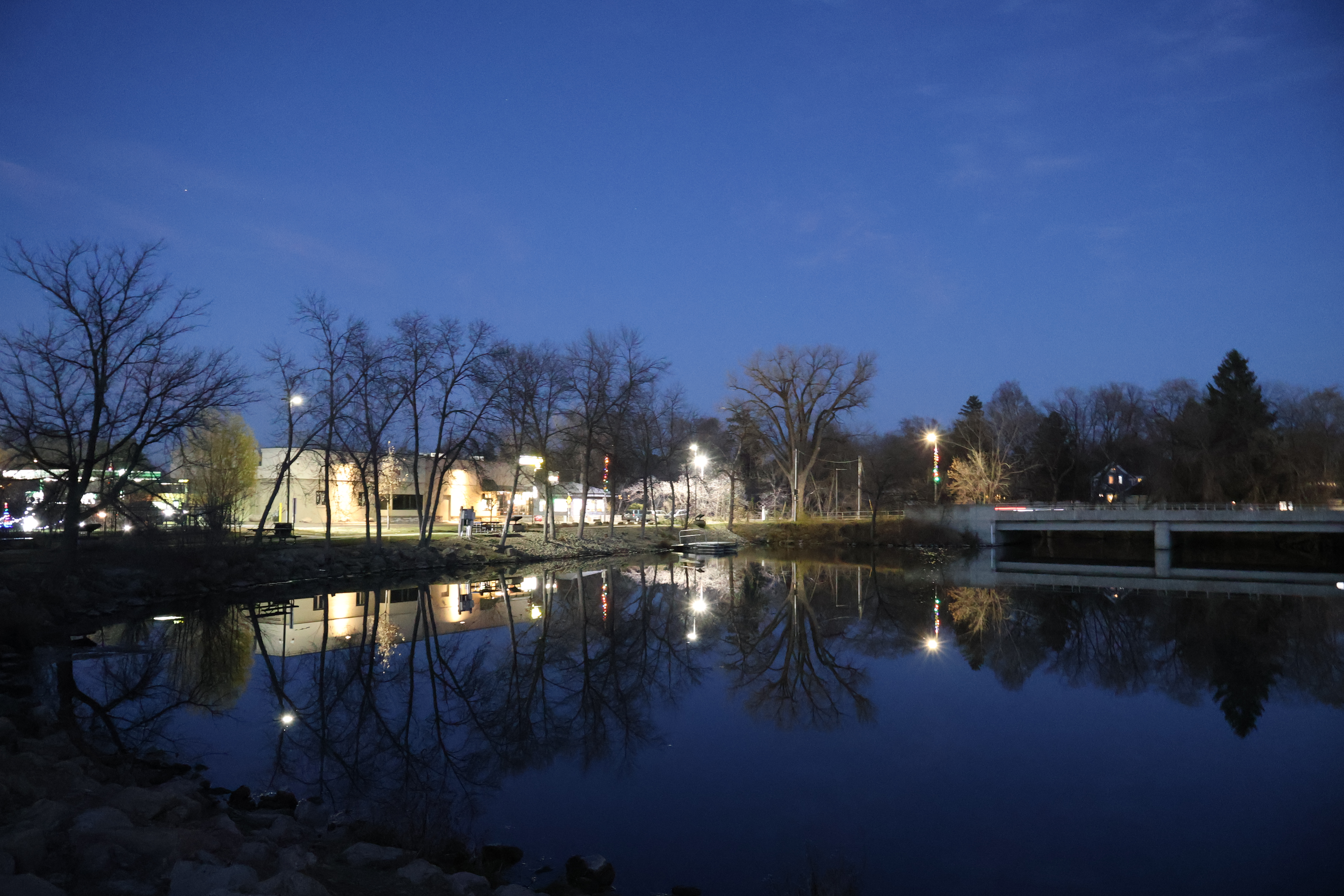

New Richmond is located at 45°07′11″N 92°32′21″W (45.119856, −92.539142).

According to the United States Census Bureau, the city has a total area of 9.35 square miles (24.22 km^{2}), of which 9.18 square miles (23.78 km^{2}) is land and 0.17 square miles (0.44 km^{2}) is water. A major source of hydrological water is from the Willow River, which is dammed near the center of town.

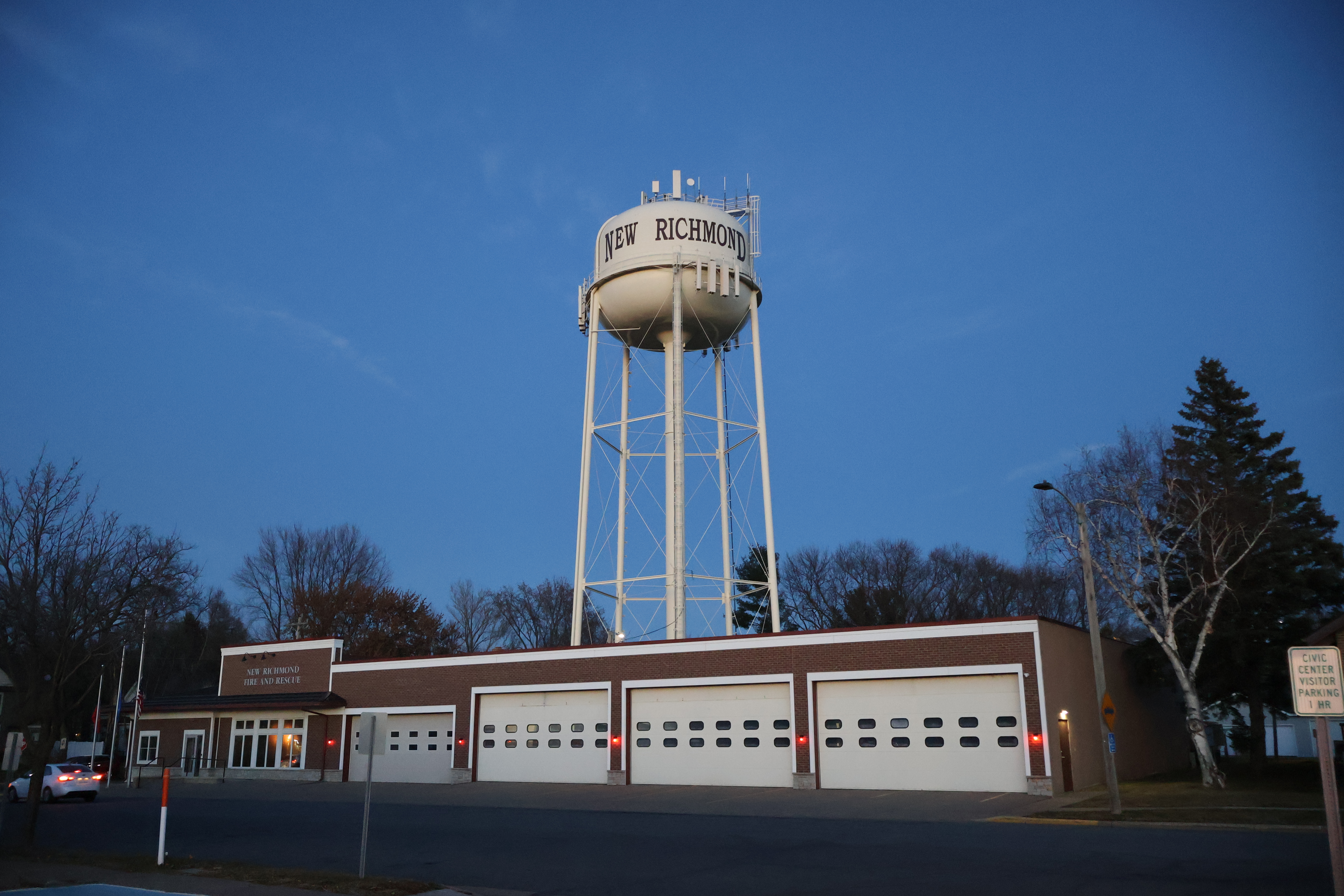
The Water Tower of New Richmond, Wisconsin.

== Demographics ==
Historical population
Census	Pop.	Note	%±
1880	729		—
1890	1,408		93.1%
1900	1,631		15.8%
1910	1,988		21.9%
1920	2,248		13.1%
1930	2,112		−6.0%
1940	2,388		13.1%
1950	2,886		20.9%
1960	3,316		14.9%
1970	3,707		11.8%
1980	4,306		16.2%
1990	5,106		18.6%
2000	6,310		23.6%
2010	8,375		32.7%
2020	10,079		20.3%
U.S. Decennial Census

=== 2020 census ===
As of the 2020 census, New Richmond had a population of 10,079. The median age was 36.8 years. 24.6% of residents were under the age of 18 and 16.8% of residents were 65 years of age or older. For every 100 females there were 97.5 males, and for every 100 females age 18 and over there were 94.6 males age 18 and over.

88.6% of residents lived in urban areas, while 11.4% lived in rural areas.

There were 4,129 households in New Richmond, of which 31.0% had children under the age of 18 living in them. Of all households, 43.4% were married-couple households, 18.5% were households with a male householder and no spouse or partner present, and 27.9% were households with a female householder and no spouse or partner present. About 31.2% of all households were made up of individuals and 12.4% had someone living alone who was 65 years of age or older.

There were 4,280 housing units, of which 3.5% were vacant. The homeowner vacancy rate was 0.7% and the rental vacancy rate was 2.7%.

Racial composition as of the 2020 census
Race	Number	Percent
White	9,124	90.5%
Black or African American	173	1.7%
American Indian and Alaska Native	43	0.4%
Asian	104	1.0%
Native Hawaiian and Other Pacific Islander	1	0.0%
Some other race	118	1.2%
Two or more races	516	5.1%
Hispanic or Latino (of any race)	316	3.1%

=== 2010 census ===
As of the census of 2010, there were 8,375 people, 3,421 households, and 2,094 families residing in the city. The population density was 912.3 inhabitants per square mile (352.2/km^{2}). There were 3,684 housing units at an average density of 401.3 per square mile (154.9/km^{2}). The racial makeup of the city was 95.5% White, 1.3% African American, 0.6% Native American, 0.7% Asian, 0.3% from other races, and 1.6% from two or more races. Hispanic or Latino of any race were 2.1% of the population.

There were 3,421 households, of which 34.2% had children under the age of 18 living with them, 44.9% were married couples living together, 10.9% had a female householder with no husband present, 5.4% had a male householder with no wife present, and 38.8% were non-families. 31.4% of all households were made up of individuals, and 10.9% had someone living alone who was 65 years of age or older. The average household size was 2.37 and the average family size was 3.01.

The median age in the city was 33.9 years. 26.1% of residents were under the age of 18; 8% were between the ages of 18 and 24; 30.3% were from 25 to 44; 23.2% were from 45 to 64; and 12.4% were 65 years of age or older. The gender makeup of the city was 48.9% male and 51.1% female.

=== 2000 census ===
As of the census of 2000, there were 6,310 people, 2,561 households, and 1,546 families residing in the city. The population density was 1,237.2 inhabitants per square mile (477.7/km^{2}). There were 2,657 housing units at an average density of 521.0 per square mile (201.2/km^{2}). The racial makeup of the city was 98.15% White, 0.22% African American, 0.24% Native American, 0.35% Asian, 0.13% from other races, and 0.92% from two or more races. Hispanic or Latino of any race were 0.78% of the population.

There were 2,561 households, out of which 33.2% had children under the age of 18 living with them, 46.3% were married couples living together, 10.1% had a female householder with no husband present, and 39.6% were non-families. 31.5% of all households were made up of individuals, and 11.8% had someone living alone who was 65 years of age or older. The average household size was 2.38 and the average family size was 3.06.

In the city, the population was spread out, with 26.3% under the age of 18, 9.5% from 18 to 24, 30.8% from 25 to 44, 18.2% from 45 to 64, and 15.1% who were 65 years of age or older. The median age was 34 years. For every 100 females, there were 91.7 males. For every 100 females age 18 and over, there were 88.0 males.

The median income for a household in the city was $43,475, and the median income for a family was $52,422. Males had a median income of $37,306 versus $27,153 for females. The per capita income for the city was $19,840. About 4.2% of families and 6.8% of the population were below the poverty line, including 4.8% of those under age 18 and 11.3% of those age 65 or over.

== Education ==
The New Richmond School district consists of three elementary schools, Starr, Hillside, and Paperjack; New Richmond Middle School; and New Richmond High School. There is also a private elementary and middle school, St. Mary School.

Northwood Technical College New Richmond is a technical college that serves New Richmond and the surrounding area. Northwood also has campuses in Rice Lake, Ashland, and Superior, Wisconsin.

== Transportation ==
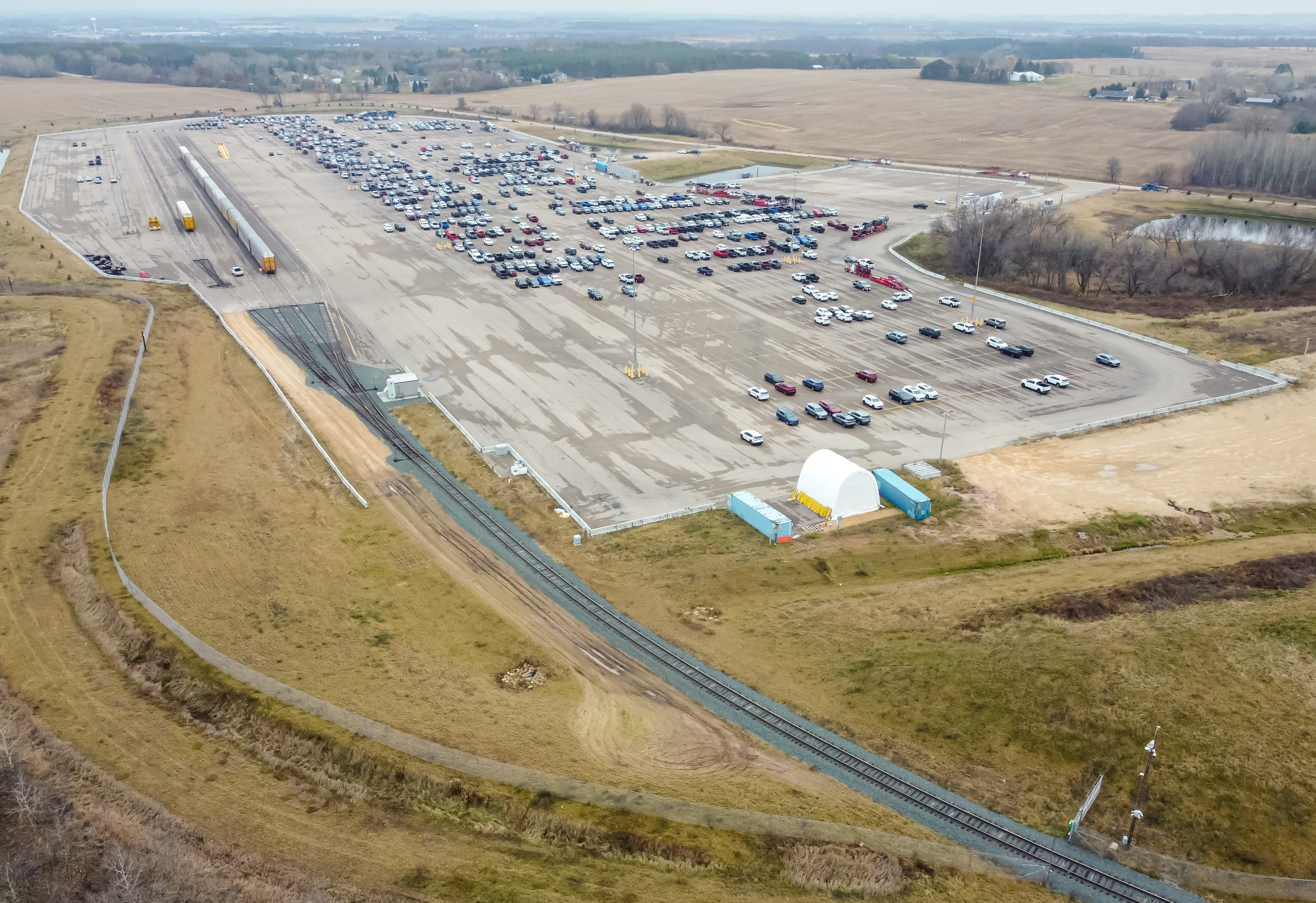
Autorack terminal on the edge of the city in the Town of Richmond

New Richmond station previously served passenger trains on the Soo Line Railroad. Wisconsin Highways 64 and 65 are main routes in the community. Highway 64 runs east–west, and Highway 65 / Knowles Avenue runs north–south. Other main routes include County Roads A, CC, and K, and Fourth Street.

The New Richmond Regional Airport (ICAO: KRNH) is a large general aviation airport north of New Richmond's central business district that serves the region and the military. The airport is considered the largest in Wisconsin in terms of the number of hangars at the airport, which total 123. The airport also ranks first in Wisconsin in terms of based aircraft totaling more than 275. The nearest airport with commercial flights is Minneapolis-Saint Paul International Airport.

== Notable people ==
- Robert M. Boche, Wisconsin State Representative
- John Doar, civil rights attorney
- Michael P. Early, Wisconsin State Representative
- Casey Finnegan, college football coach
- Albert W. Hillestad, Episcopal Bishop of Springfield, Illinois
- Warren P. Knowles, 37th governor of Wisconsin
- Scott Lynch, fantasy author
- Johnny Blood, football player for the Green Bay Packers (1929–1936), member of the Pro Football Hall of Fame, former NFL head coach
- Ethan B. Minier, Wisconsin State Representative, lawyer, and farmer
- George Oakes, Wisconsin State Representative and lawyer
- Roy Vassau, professional football player for the Milwaukee Badgers
- William W. Ward, Wisconsin State Representative and lawyer
- Orrin J. Williams, Wisconsin State Representative

== See also ==
- List of cities in Wisconsin
- Citizens for the St. Croix Valley political organization
