= Donald Chisholm =

Donald Chisholm may refer to:

- Donald Chisholm (politician) (1822–1890), Canadian member of parliament
- Donald Chisholm (racing driver) (born 1976), Canadian racing driver

== See also ==
- Donald Chisholm Towner (1903–1985), collector and historian of British ceramics and painter
