= William T. Towner =

American architect

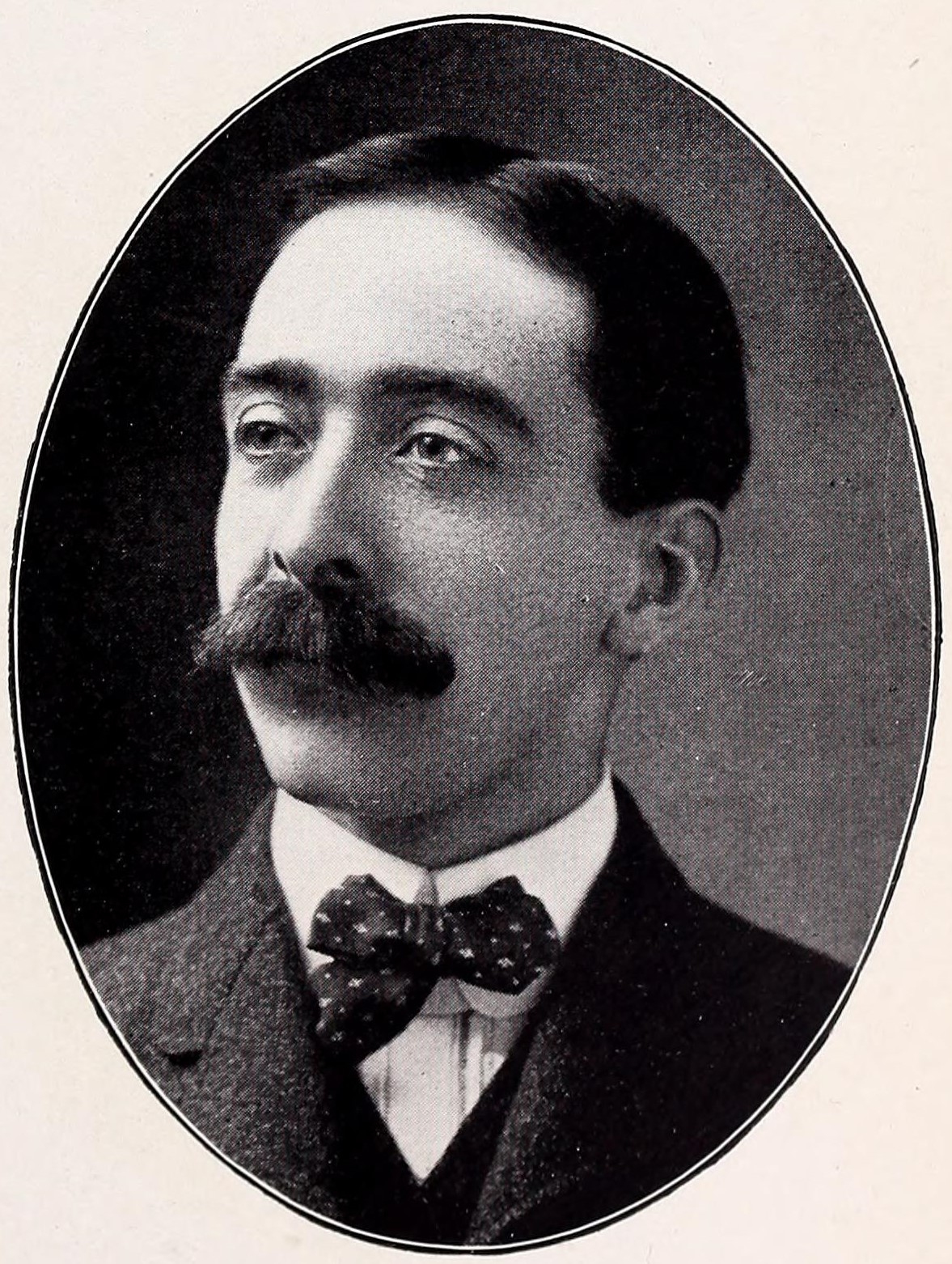
- Occupation: Architect

William T. Towner (1869 – 1950) was an American architect based in St. Paul, Minnesota.

"Architect William T. Towner of St. Paul was thirty years old when he designed the St. Croix County Courthouse in 1900. A native of Sussex, England, Towner was educated in London, and immigrated to America in 1881.... Before opening a St. Paul office in 1898, Towner worked in Montana and for the Land and Improvement Company in West Superior."

A few of his works have been listed on the National Register of Historic Places.

Notable works include:

- Litchfield Opera House (1900), 126 N. Marshall Ave., Litchfield, Minnesota (Towner, W.T.), NRHP-listed
- St. Croix County Courthouse (1900), 904 3rd St., Hudson, Wisconsin (Towner, William T.), NRHP-listed
- Waverly Junior and Senior High School (1913), 443 Pennsylvania Ave., Waverly, Tioga County, New York (Towner, W.T.), NRHP-listed

In 1901 and/or 1902, W.T. Towner of 157 Summer St., Boston, Massachusetts, designed a school for Rumford Falls, Maine and High Bridge, New Jersey, and an Industrial School for Colored Children in the Town of Union.

In 1910, William T. Towner, then of 320 Fifth Avenue in New York City, had designed a high school for Schenevus, New York.

In 1917 William T. Towner was an architect in New York City, and was designing a two-story brick municipal building for the village of Canastota, New York.
