= Litchfield Opera House =

- U.S. National Register of Historic Places
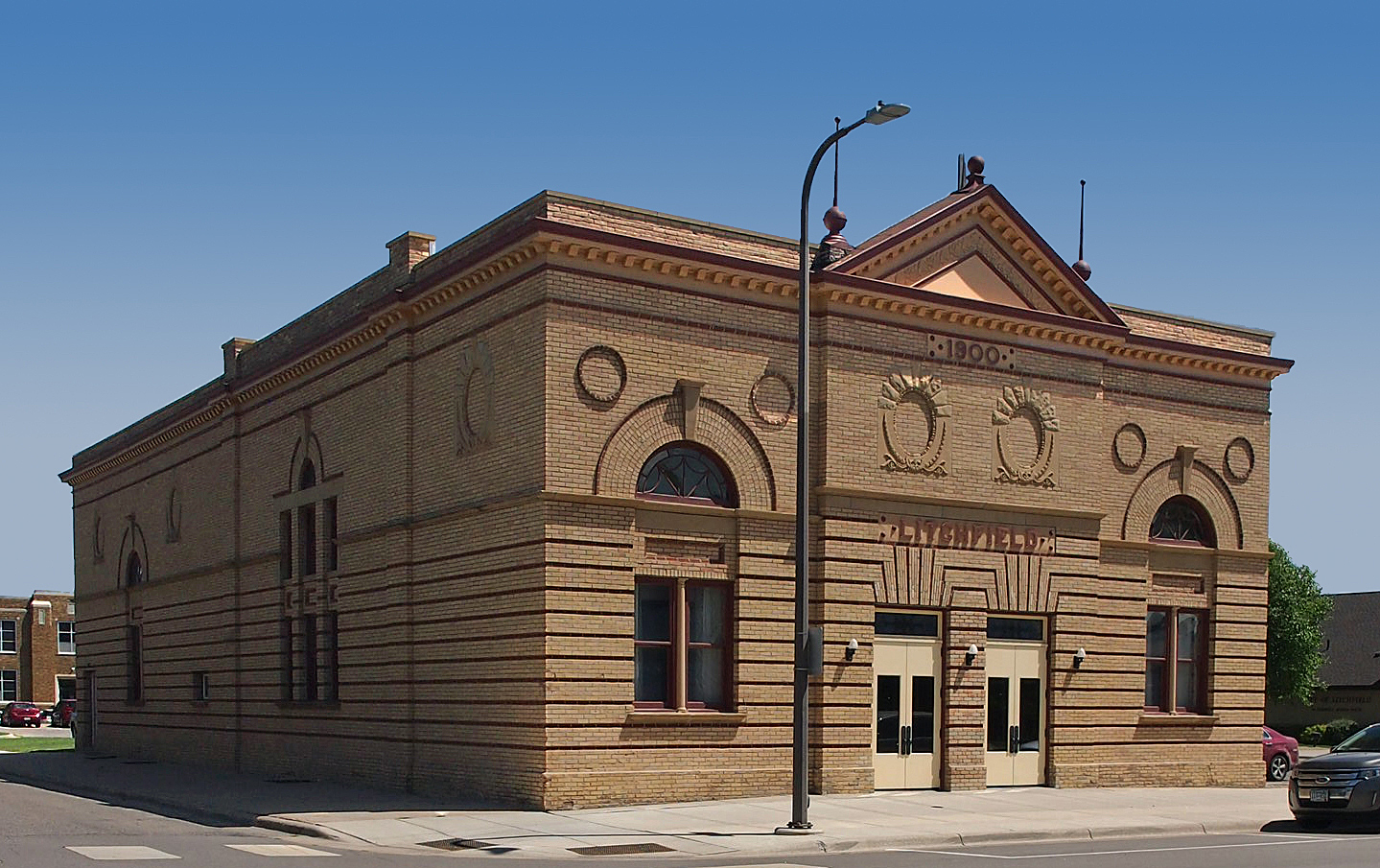
- The Litchfield Opera House from the northwest
- Location: 126 N. Marshall Ave., Litchfield, Minnesota
- Coordinates: 45°07′38″N 94°31′33″W
- Area: less than one acre
- Built: 1900
- Built by: N.P. Franzen
- Architect: W.T. Towner
- Architectural style: Renaissance
- NRHP reference No.: 84000019
- Added to NRHP: October 4, 1984

The Litchfield Opera House is a community building in Litchfield, Minnesota, United States, listed on the National Register of Historic Places for its significance to the community. A committee of businessmen organized in 1899 with the intention of providing a place to hold meetings and theatrical performances. The previous town hall, built in 1871, was obsolete. The government of Litchfield Township, Minnesota paid for construction of the building, which was designed by architect W.T. Towner and built by N.P. Franzen. The city bought the building from the township in 1911. The opera house was listed on the National Register of Historic Places in 1983.

The building is a well-preserved example of Renaissance Revival architecture, which is otherwise rare in Litchfield and Meeker County. Most of the façade is yellow clay brick, manufactured locally, and accented with red brick and red terra cotta patterns. The opera house opened on November 8, 1900, with the play "The Marble Heart" starring William Owen. Besides operas and performances, the auditorium housed town meetings, elections, military recruitment, and other government functions. Somewhere between 1930 and 1939, the interior was remodeled for use as city offices. In 1983, when the building was nominated to the National Register, it housed civic offices and organizations, and it was used as a meeting place for senior citizens, the Girl Scouts, and community education. Public officials and the Litchfield Police Department also used some of the rooms. In 2002, the city removed its offices from the building and moved its offices to trailers in the parking lot. This move was made because mold was found in the building. The city completed its new city hall in 2006, but the fate of the building had not been decided yet. In 2008, the city sold the building to the Greater Litchfield Opera House Association, Inc. for $100,000. The city accepted a 1900 silver dollar for payment and specified that the balance of the purchase price would be invested in the building to renovate it for the community.

Between 2008 and 2023 the building's roof, brickwork, windows and interior were restored through a series of grants from the Minnesota Historical Society funded by the 2008 Clean Water, Land, and Legacy Amendment.

The building is available for rental for parties, weddings, dinners, funeral, bar mitzvahs, and other personal events.

== Gallery ==
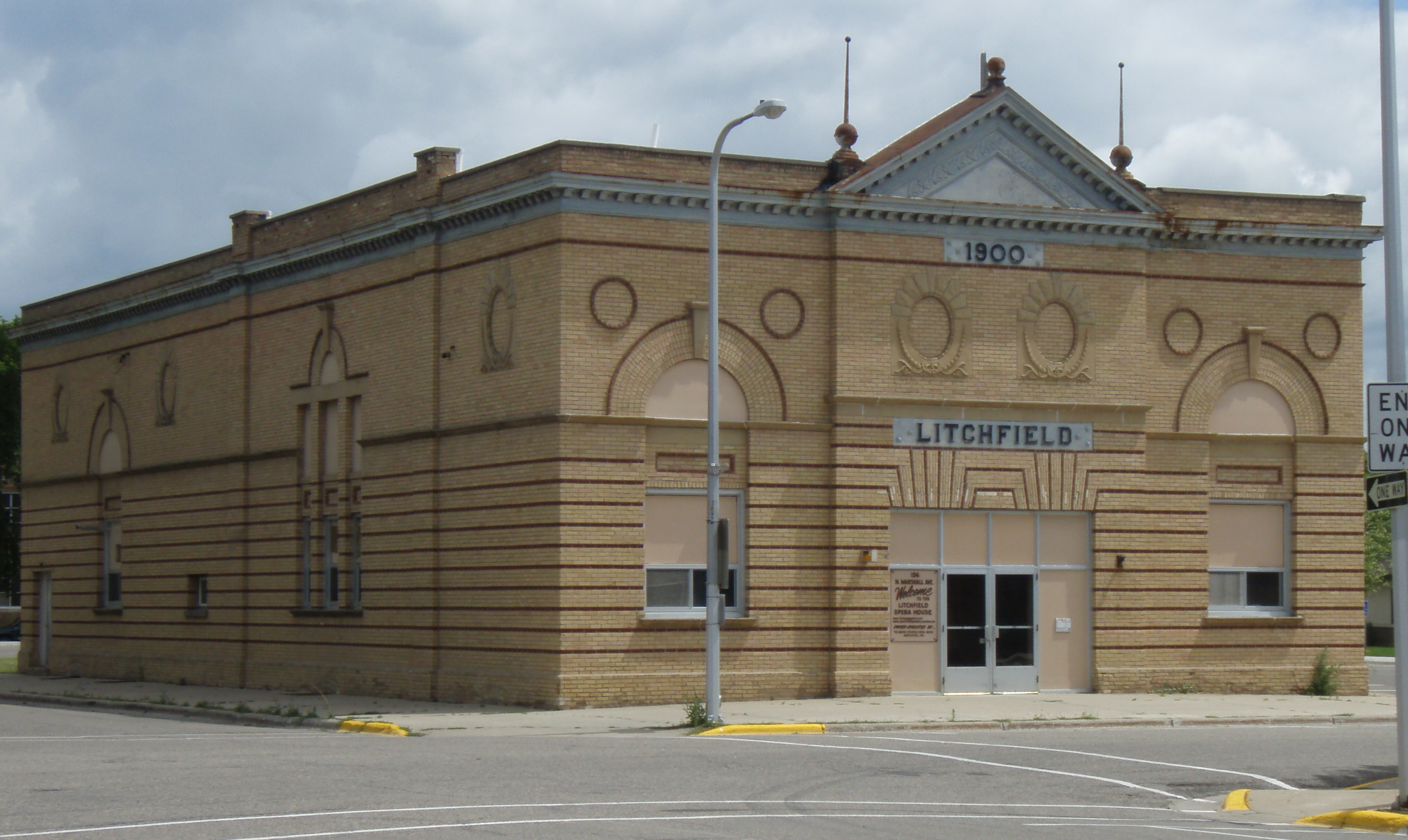
Litchfield Opera House before restoration

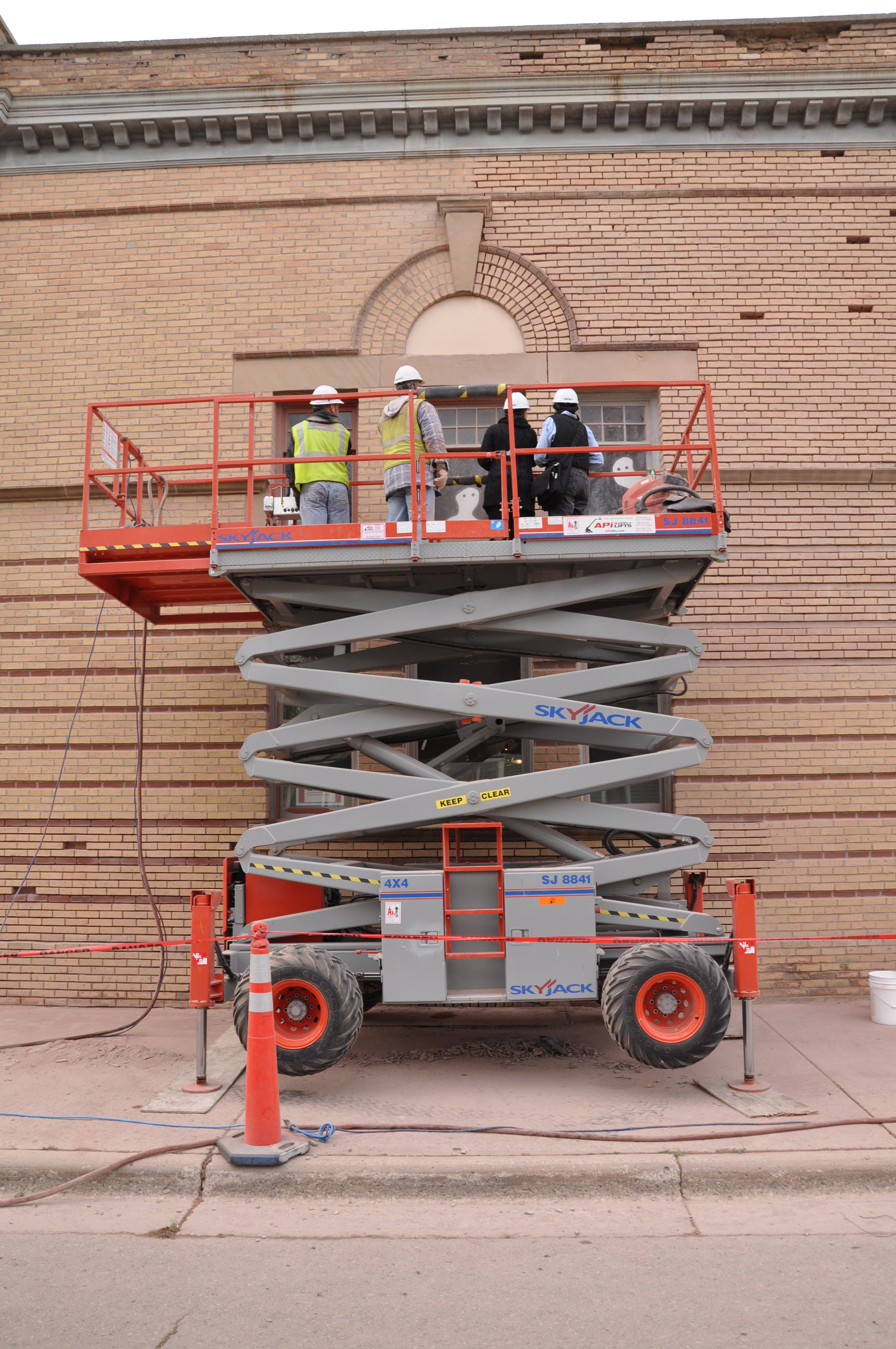
Inspection of brickwork and widows

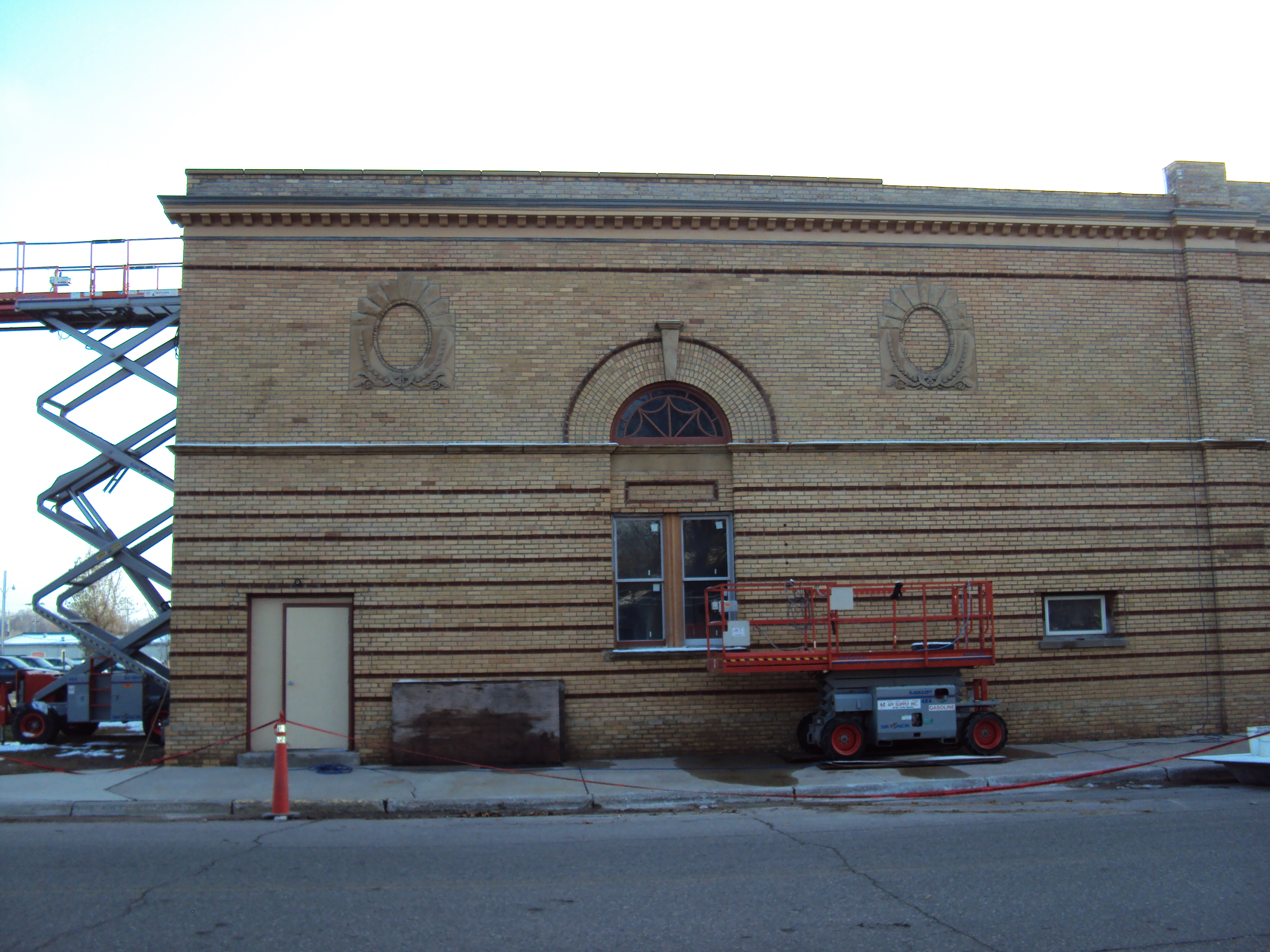
Restoration of brickwork

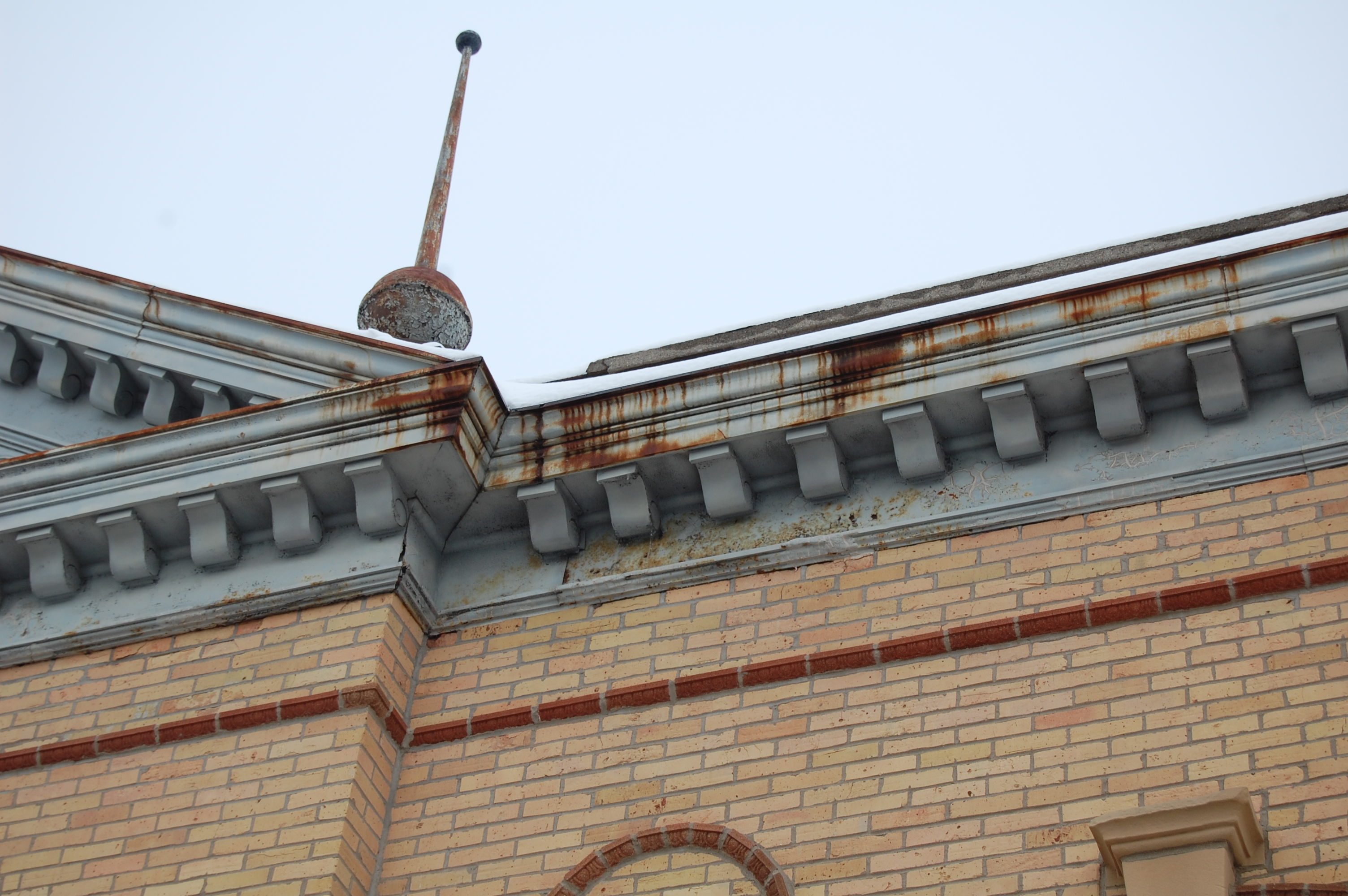
Cornice before restoration
