= St. Croix County Courthouse =

- U.S. National Register of Historic Places
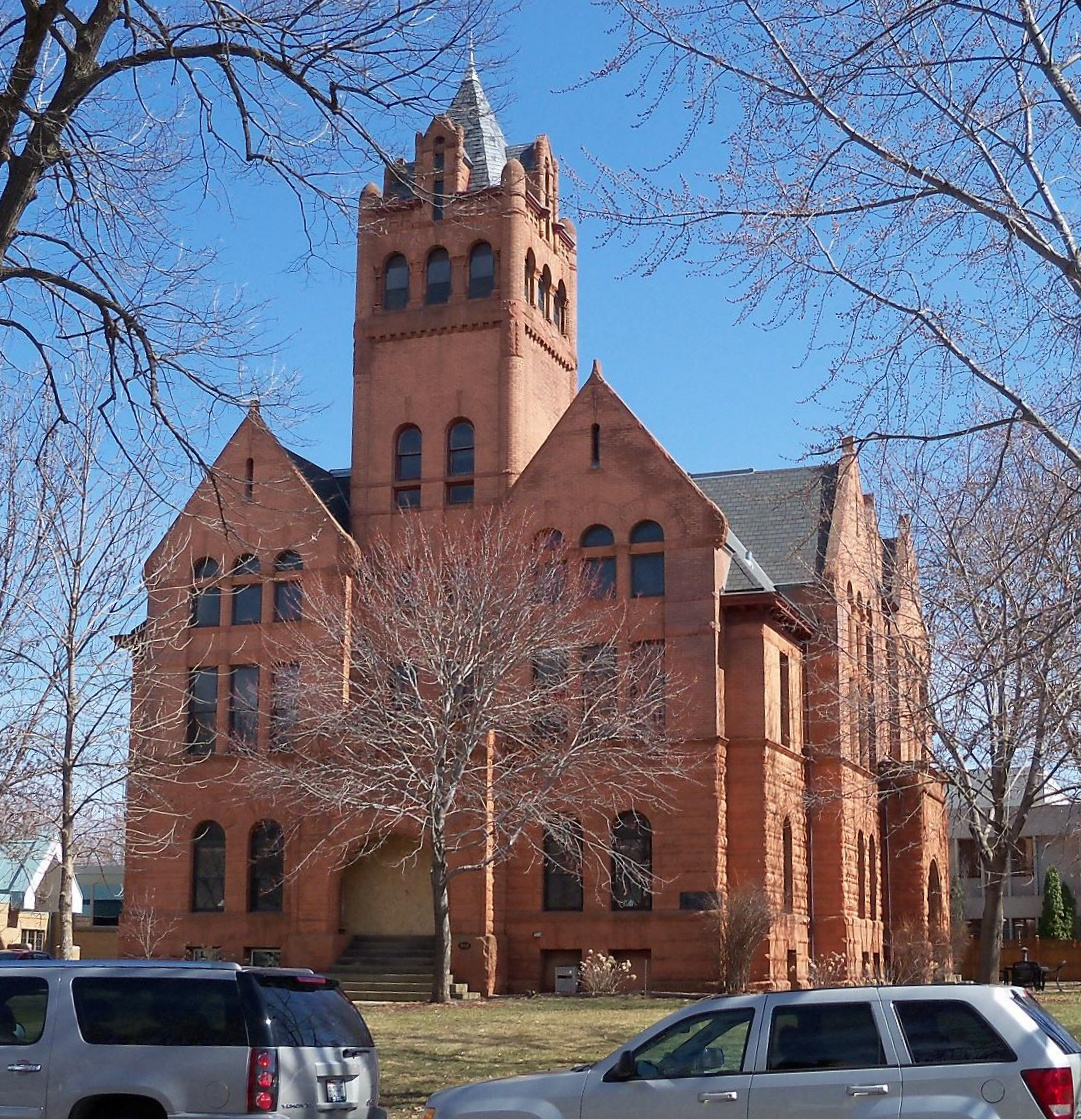
- St Croix County Courthouse

- Location within Wisconsin Location within the United States
- Interactive map showing the location for St. Croix County Courthouse
- Location: 904 3rd St. Hudson, Wisconsin
- Coordinates: 44.97955°N 92.755°W
- Area: less than one acre
- Built: 1900
- Architect: William T. Towner
- Architectural style: Richardsonian Romanesque
- MPS: County Courthouses of Wisconsin TR
- NRHP reference No.: 82000710
- Added to NRHP: March 9, 1982

The St. Croix County Courthouse is a former courthouse built in Hudson, Wisconsin in 1900. It was added to the National Register of Historic Places in 1982. The building housed the circuit court of St. Croix County, Wisconsin from 1900 until 1966. It then served as a county office building until 1993, when the county constructed its current courthouse and government center. The old courthouse is a private residence.

It is Richardsonian Romanesque in style. It was deemed "One of the finest of the state's courthouses designed in the Richardsonian manner" and described as "a symmetrical assemblage of Romanesque elements."
