= Troy, St. Croix County, Wisconsin =

Troy, Wisconsin
- Town
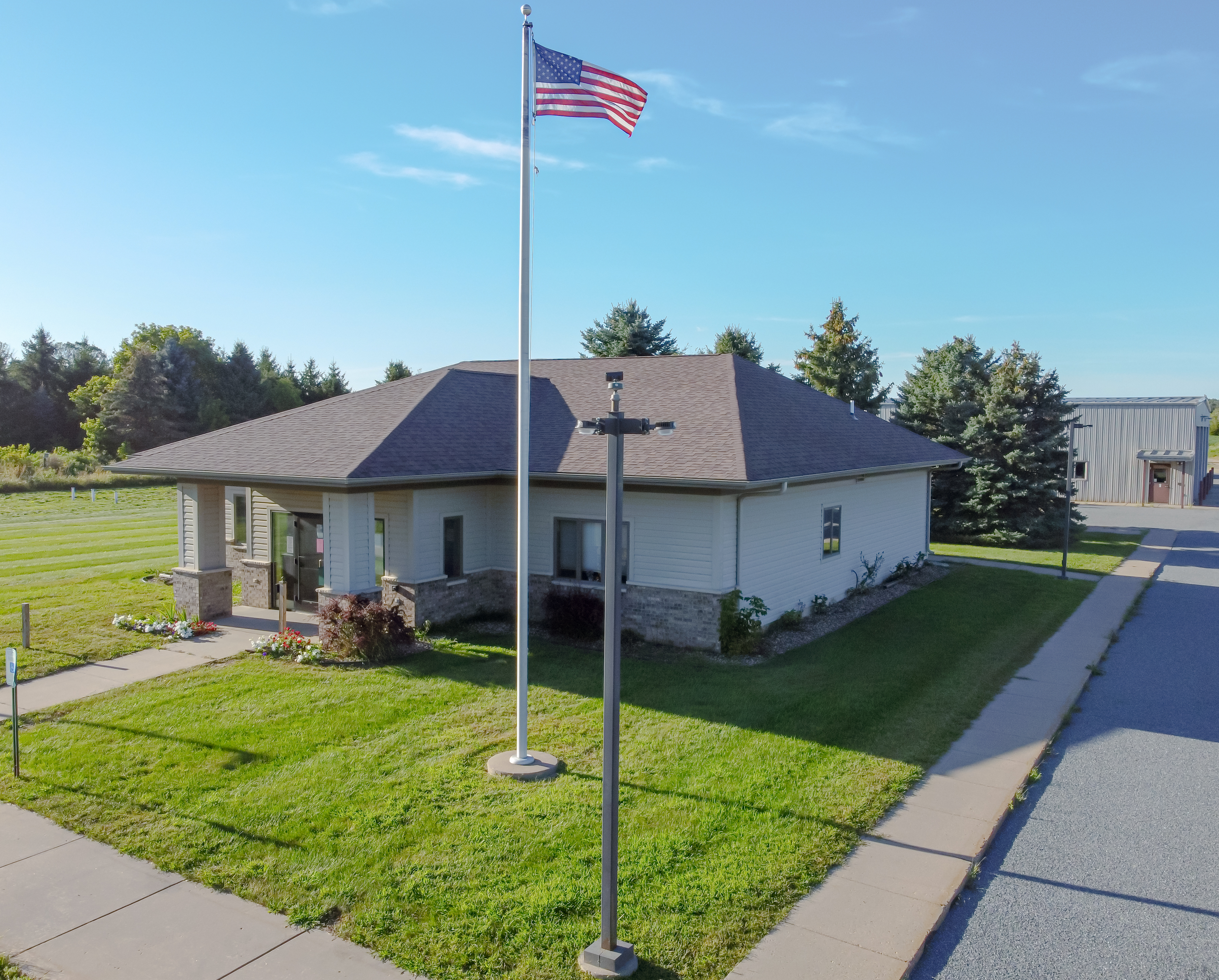
- Town hall

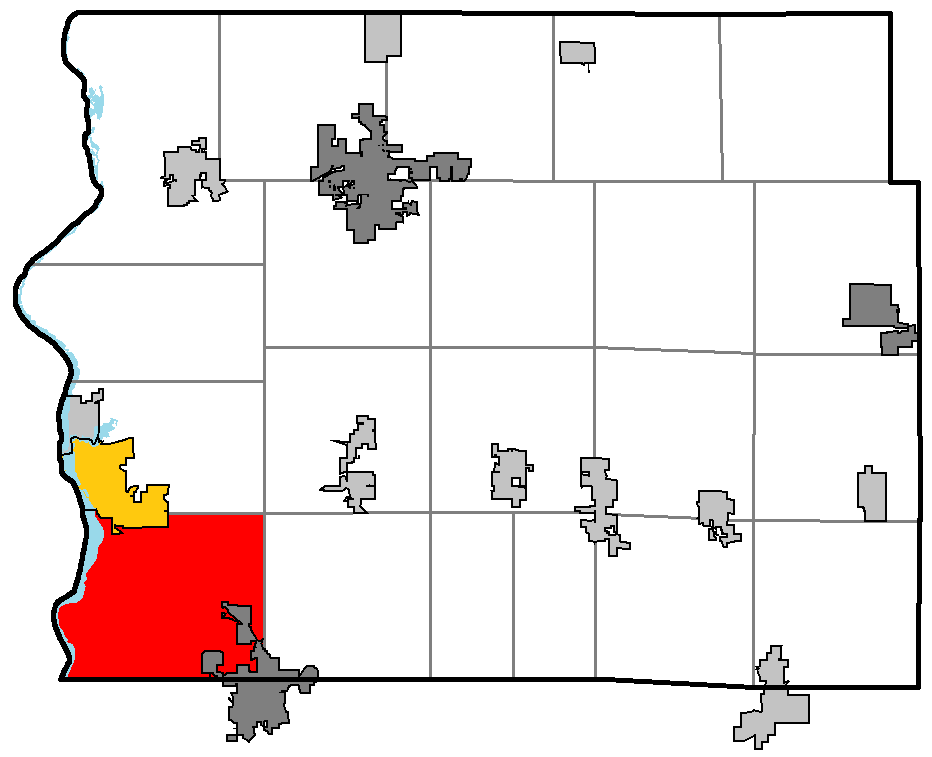
- Location of Troy, within St. Croix County

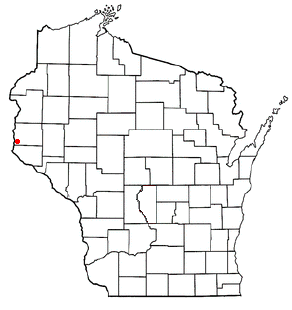
- Location of Troy, St. Croix County, Wisconsin
- Coordinates: 44°54′22″N 92°41′15″W
- Country: United States
- State: Wisconsin
- County: St. Croix

Area
  - Total: 39.8 sq mi (103.0 km^{2})
  - Land: 37.7 sq mi (97.7 km^{2})
  - Water: 2.0 sq mi (5.3 km^{2})
- Elevation: 950 ft (290 m)

Population (2020)
  - Total: 5,518
  - Density: 146/sq mi (56.5/km^{2})
- Time zone: UTC-6 (Central (CST))
  - Summer (DST): UTC-5 (CDT)
- Area codes: 715 & 534
- FIPS code: 55-80800
- GNIS feature ID: 1584297
- Website: http://www.townoftroy.org

Troy is a town in St. Croix County, Wisconsin, United States. The population was 5,518 at the 2020 census. The unincorporated community of Glover is located in the town.

== Geography ==
According to the United States Census Bureau, the town has a total area of 39.8 square miles (103.0 km^{2}), of which 37.7 square miles (97.7 km^{2}) is land and 2.0 square miles (5.3 km^{2}) (5.11%) is water.

== Demographics ==
Historical population
Census	Pop.	Note	%±
2000	3,661		—
2010	4,705		28.5%
2020	5,518		17.3%

As of the census of 2000, there were 3,661 people, 1,250 households, and 1,047 families residing in the town. The population density was 97.0 inhabitants per square mile (37.5/km^{2}). There were 1,328 housing units at an average density of 35.2 per square mile (13.6/km^{2}). The racial makeup of the town was 98.25% White, 0.11% African American, 0.33% Native American, 0.38% Asian, 0.27% from other races, and 0.66% from two or more races. Hispanic or Latino of any race were 1.17% of the population.

There were 1,250 households, out of which 43.5% had children under the age of 18 living with them, 76.6% were married couples living together, 3.4% had a female householder with no husband present, and 16.2% were non-families. 12.1% of all households were made up of individuals, and 2.5% had someone living alone who was 65 years of age or older. The average household size was 2.93 and the average family size was 3.20.

In the town, the population was spread out, with 30.1% under the age of 18, 6.4% from 18 to 24, 32.0% from 25 to 44, 26.3% from 45 to 64, and 5.2% who were 65 years of age or older. The median age was 36 years. For every 100 females, there were 106.0 males. For every 100 females age 18 and over, there were 105.9 males.

The median income for a household in the town was $73,125, and the median income for a family was $75,874. Males had a median income of $44,942 versus $39,360 for females. The per capita income for the town was $28,861. About 0.7% of families and 1.9% of the population were below the poverty line, including 1.7% of those under age 18 and none of those age 65 or over.

== Notable people ==
- George W. Chinnock, member of the Wisconsin State Assembly, was Chairman, Treasurer and Assessor of the town
- John A. Chinnock, member of the Wisconsin State Assembly, was Chairman of the town
- John Day Putnam, member of the Wisconsin State Assembly, was Chairman, Treasurer and Assessor of the town
- Edwin Rohl, member of the Wisconsin State Assembly, was born in the town
