= Hudson, Wisconsin =

- City
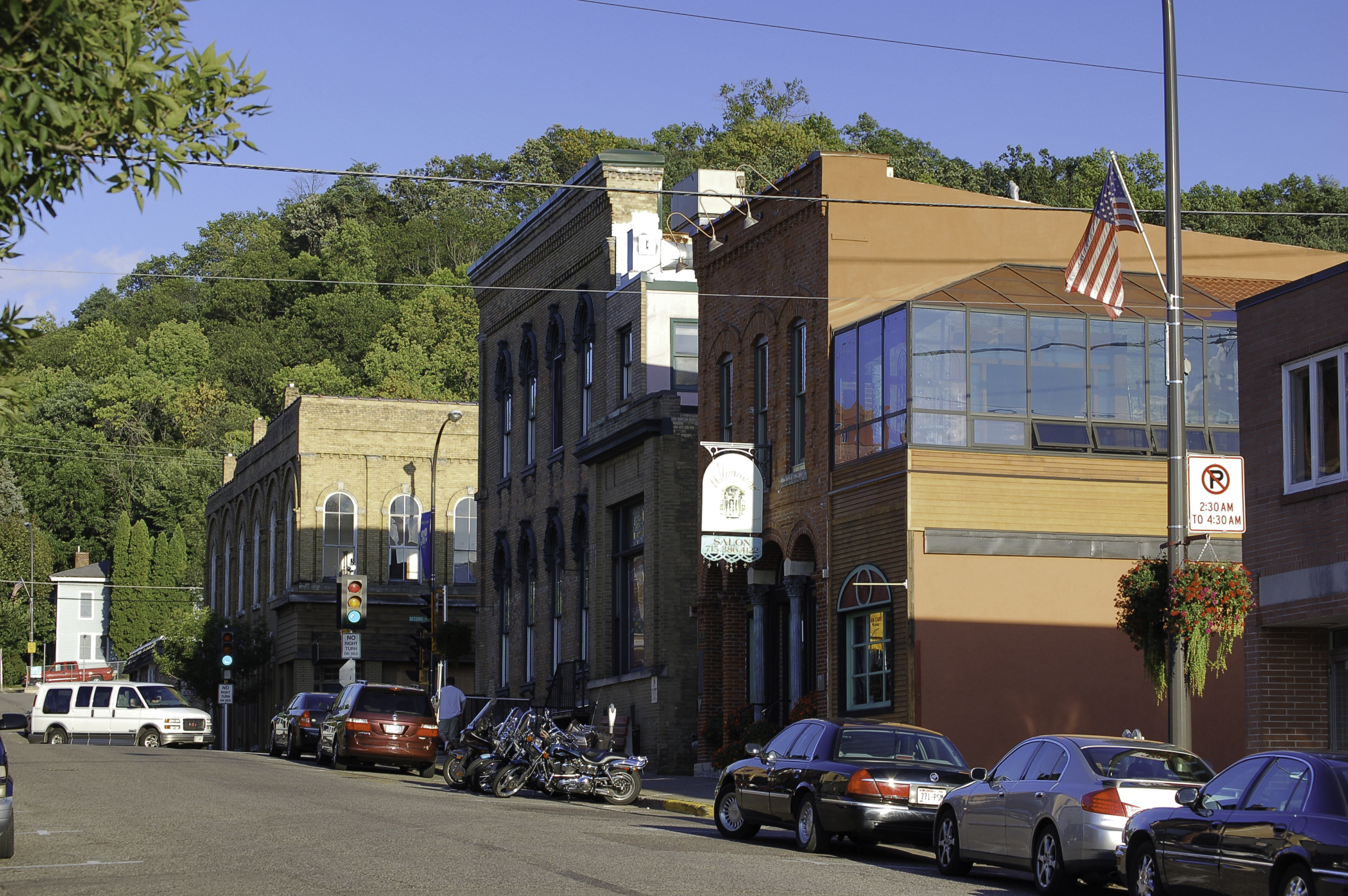
- Downtown Hudson, September 2010
- Interactive map of Hudson, Wisconsin
- Location within Wisconsin Location within the United States
- Coordinates: 44°58′19″N 92°44′42″W
- Country: United States
- State: Wisconsin
- County: St. Croix

Government
  - Type: Mayor-council
  - Mayor: Rich O'Connor

Area
  - City: 7.64 sq mi (19.80 km^{2})
  - Land: 6.76 sq mi (17.52 km^{2})
  - Water: 0.88 sq mi (2.28 km^{2})

Population (2020)
  - City: 14,755
  - Density: 2,180/sq mi (842/km^{2})
  - Metro: 3,690,261 (16th)
  - Demonym: Hudsonite
- Time zone: UTC−6 (Central (CST))
  - Summer (DST): UTC−5 (CDT)
- ZIP codes: 54016, 54017
- Area codes: 715 & 534
- FIPS code: 55-36250
- Website: www.hudsonwi.gov

Hudson is a city in and the county seat of St. Croix County, Wisconsin, United States. As of the 2020 census, its population was 14,755. It is part of the Minneapolis–St. Paul metropolitan area.

== History ==
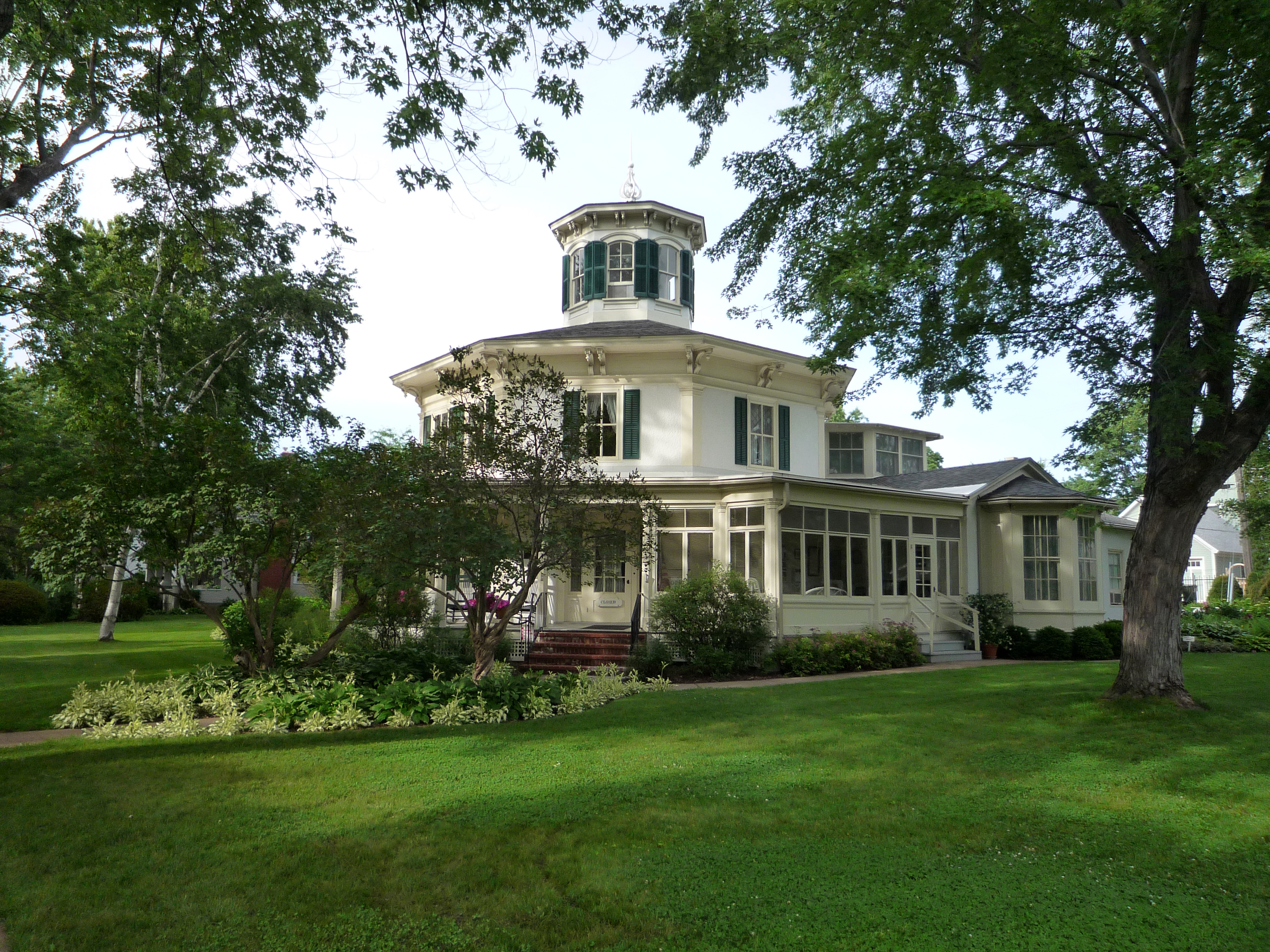
The Octagon House Museum, listed on the National Register of Historic Places, was built in 1855.

Several Native American burial mounds dated to the Middle or Late Woodland period have been found in what is now Birkmose Park in Hudson. Hudson was settled in 1840 by Louis Massey and his brother in-law, Peter Bouchea. William Streets arrived at about the same time. Later that year, Joseph Sauperson (commonly known as Joe LaGrue) took up residence. These four are considered Hudson's original inhabitants. Massey and Bouchea settled at the mouth of the Willow River, near the present-day First and St. Croix Streets. They had been part of a group that lived for some time along the river below Fort Snelling, which appears on some old maps as "Massey's Landing".

Hudson was originally called "Willow River". It was later named Buena Vista by Judge Joel Foster, founder of River Falls, after returning from the Mexican War where he fought in the Battle of Buena Vista. In 1852, Alfred D. Gray, Hudson's first mayor, petitioned to change the city's name to Hudson, because the bluffs along the St. Croix River reminded him of the Hudson River in his native New York.

A large number of settlers arrived in the 1850s and 1860s, many of whom were ancestors of today's residents. The lumber industry was the area's prime attraction, and over time sawmills were established throughout the St. Croix Valley.

The Chicago, St. Paul, Minneapolis and Omaha Railway was formed in 1881 from other railroads building between the Twin Cities and Chicago. The shops and headquarters of the Omaha Road were in Hudson. This route is now part of the Union Pacific Railroad.

On August 30, 1917, a violent mob of 1,000 held a night rally in front of the armory protesting the pacifist People's Council of America's attempt to hold a conference in Hudson's prizefighting arena. The crowd then moved on the four organizers in the lobby of their hotel and threatened to hang them. Only after the pleadings of county attorney N. O. Varnum were the four allowed to leave town at once and unharmed.

U.S. Highway 12 once crossed the St. Croix River on a toll bridge between Wisconsin and Minnesota, which provided revenue for the town. With the construction of Interstate 94, the toll bridge was removed, though the long causeway extending to the former bridge location is now open to the public as a pedestrian walkway, known as "The Dike".

== Geography ==
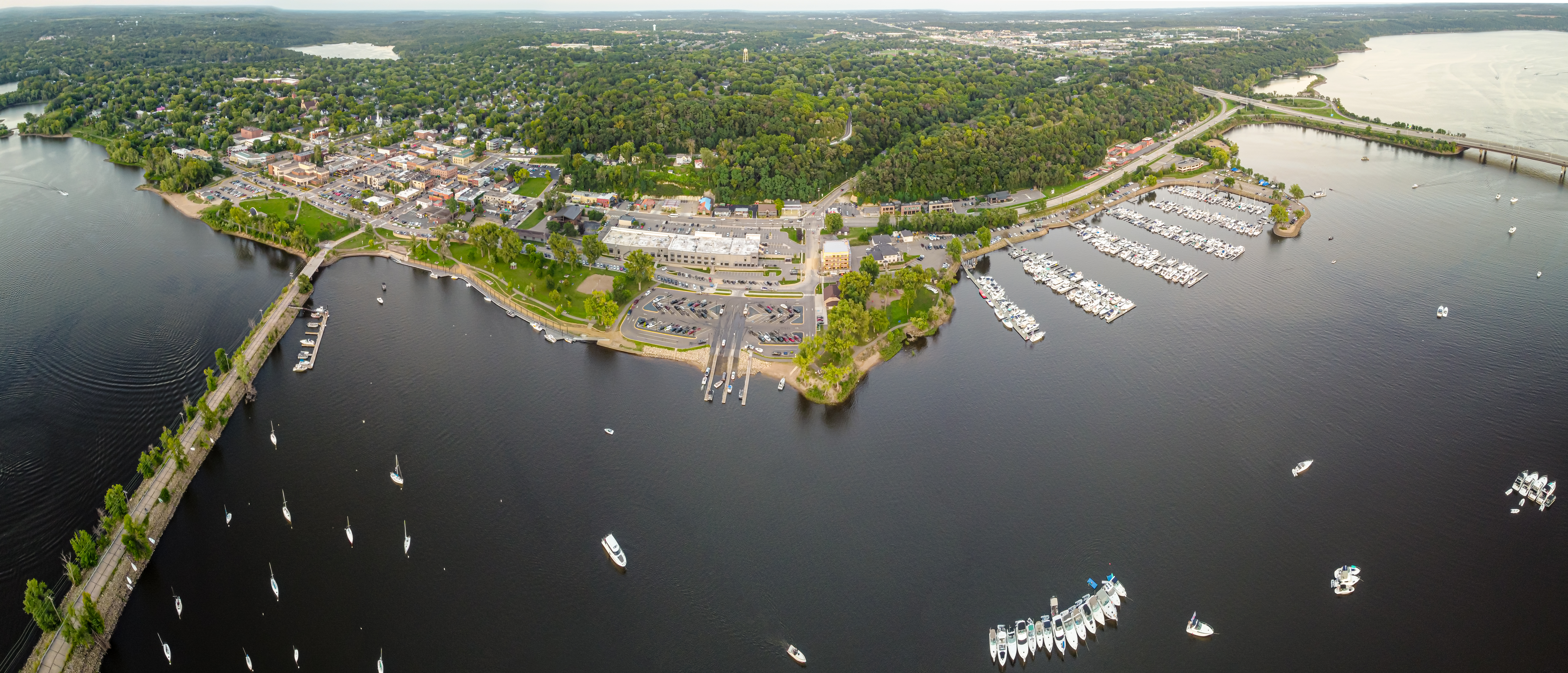
Aerial view of Hudson

According to the United States Census Bureau, the city has an area of 7.41 square miles (19.19 km^{2}), of which 6.53 square miles (16.91 km^{2}) is land and 0.88 square miles (2.28 km^{2}) is water.

Interstate Highway 94, U.S. Route 12 and Wisconsin Highway 35 are three of the main routes in the community.

=== Climate ===
Hudson

Climate chart (precipitation, max. and min. temperature)
J	F	M	A	M	J	J	A	S	O	N	D
38 −10 −14	57 −6 −14	54 1 −7	144 11 1	182 20 8	192 27 15	91 27 18	89 26 17	63 23 13	76 13 4	32 7 −4	50 −5 −12
- █ Average max. and min. temperatures in °C
- █ Precipitation totals in mm
Imperial conversion
J	F	M	A	M	J	J	A	S	O	N	D
1.5 14 7	2.2 21 7	2.1 34 19	5.7 52 34	7.2 68 46	7.6 81 59	3.6 81 64	3.5 79 63	2.5 73 55	3 55 39	1.3 45 25	2 23 10
- █ Average max. and min. temperatures in °F
- █ Precipitation totals in inches

== Demographics ==
Historical population
Census	Pop.	Note	%±
1860	1,570		—
1870	1,748		11.3%
1880	2,298		31.5%
1890	2,885		25.5%
1900	3,259		13.0%
1910	2,810		−13.8%
1920	3,014		7.3%
1930	2,725		−9.6%
1940	2,987		9.6%
1950	3,435		15.0%
1960	4,325		25.9%
1970	5,049		16.7%
1980	5,434		7.6%
1990	6,378		17.4%
2000	8,775		37.6%
2010	12,719		44.9%
2020	14,755		16.0%
U.S. Decennial Census

=== 2020 census ===
As of the 2020 census, Hudson had a population of 14,755. The median age was 40.4 years. 23.2% of residents were under the age of 18 and 19.0% of residents were 65 years of age or older. For every 100 females there were 90.5 males, and for every 100 females age 18 and over there were 87.2 males age 18 and over.

100.0% of residents lived in urban areas, while 0.0% lived in rural areas.

The population density was 2,180.8 inhabitants per square mile (842.0/km^{2}). There were 6,510 housing units at an average density of 962.2 per square mile (371.5/km^{2}).

There were 6,264 households in Hudson, of which 29.1% had children under the age of 18 living in them. Of all households, 45.9% were married-couple households, 16.9% were households with a male householder and no spouse or partner present, and 29.9% were households with a female householder and no spouse or partner present. About 32.3% of all households were made up of individuals and 14.4% had someone living alone who was 65 years of age or older.

There were 6,510 housing units, of which 3.8% were vacant. The homeowner vacancy rate was 0.5% and the rental vacancy rate was 2.4%.

Racial composition as of the 2020 census
Race	Number	Percent
White	13,206	89.5%
Black or African American	185	1.3%
American Indian and Alaska Native	64	0.4%
Asian	206	1.4%
Native Hawaiian and Other Pacific Islander	13	0.1%
Some other race	241	1.6%
Two or more races	840	5.7%
Hispanic or Latino (of any race)	648	4.4%

=== Income and poverty ===
According to the American Community Survey estimates for 2016–2020, the median income for a household in the city was $74,207, and the median income for a family was $94,292. Male full-time workers had a median income of $61,412 versus $49,663 for female workers. The per capita income for the city was $38,400. About 4.9% of families and 6.8% of the population were below the poverty line, including 12.0% of those under age 18 and 5.6% of those age 65 or over. Of the population age 25 and over, 95.0% were high school graduates or higher and 42.5% had a bachelor's degree or higher.

=== 2010 census ===
As of the census of 2010, there were 12,719 people, 5,287 households, and 3,324 families living in the city. The population density was 1,947.8 inhabitants per square mile (752.0/km^{2}). There were 5,642 housing units at an average density of 864.0 per square mile (333.6/km^{2}). The racial makeup of the city was 94.8% White, 0.9% African American, 0.3% Native American, 1.4% Asian, 0.7% from other races, and 1.8% from two or more races. Hispanic or Latino of any race were 2.7% of the population.

There were 5,287 households, of which 32.6% had children under the age of 18 living with them, 49.0% were married couples living together, 9.9% had a female householder with no husband present, 4.0% had a male householder with no wife present, and 37.1% were non-families. 29.6% of all households were made up of individuals, and 10.4% had someone living alone who was 65 years of age or older. The average household size was 2.36 and the average family size was 2.95.

The median age in the city was 35.4 years. 25.3% of residents were under the age of 18; 6.7% were between the ages of 18 and 24; 32% were from 25 to 44; 23.4% were from 45 to 64; and 12.3% were 65 years of age or older. The gender makeup of the city was 48.5% male and 51.5% female.

== Economy ==
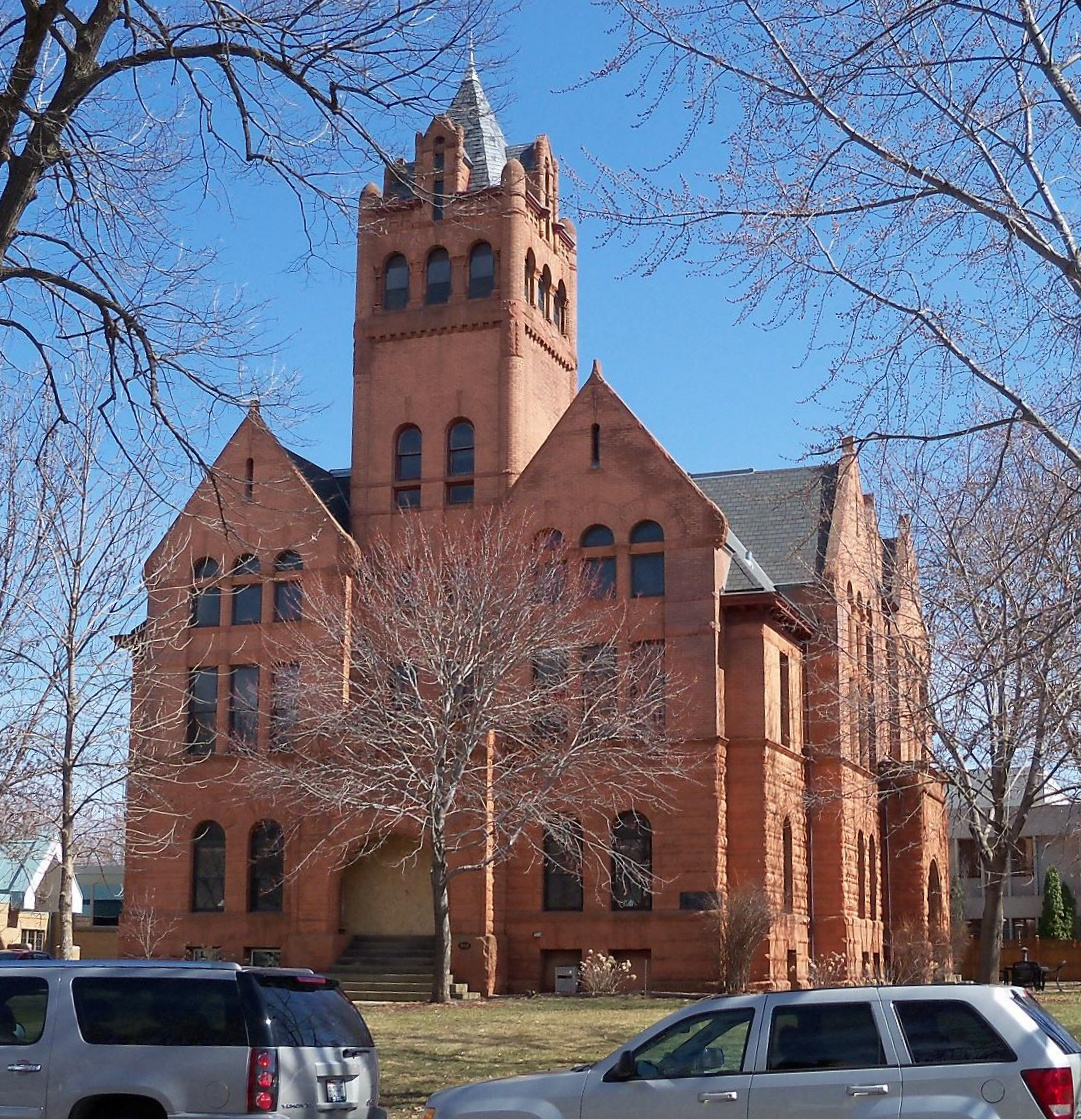
St. Croix County Courthouse

Hudson has grown as a tourist destination and restaurants on the St. Croix in its historic downtown, along with hotels and other businesses that serve traffic on Interstate Highway 94.

The former greyhound racing track, St. Croix Meadows, is being redeveloped to include a hotel, dining, commercial office space, residential condos, a baseball field, an 18-hole mini golf course, and an indoor sports complex with two hockey rinks and a soccer arena.

Two made-for-TV movies were filmed in the city in 2021.

== Arts and culture ==
Hudson is home of the Phipps Center for the Arts, a regional performing arts center. It was the original headquarters of Little Free Libraries and was the site of the first Little Free Library.

== Education ==
Hudson is served by the Hudson School District. Public schools in the city include E. P. Rock Elementary School, Hudson Prairie Elementary School, North Hudson Elementary School, Willow River Elementary School, Houlton Elementary School, River Crest Elementary School, Hudson Middle School, and Hudson High School.

St Patrick's School, a Catholic parochial school, is also in Hudson. The Trinity Academy of Hudson, a Lutheran private school, offers preschool through eighth grade.

In 2010, the University of Wisconsin–River Falls opened a satellite campus in Hudson with a focus on undergraduate and graduate degrees for adult students.

== Public safety ==
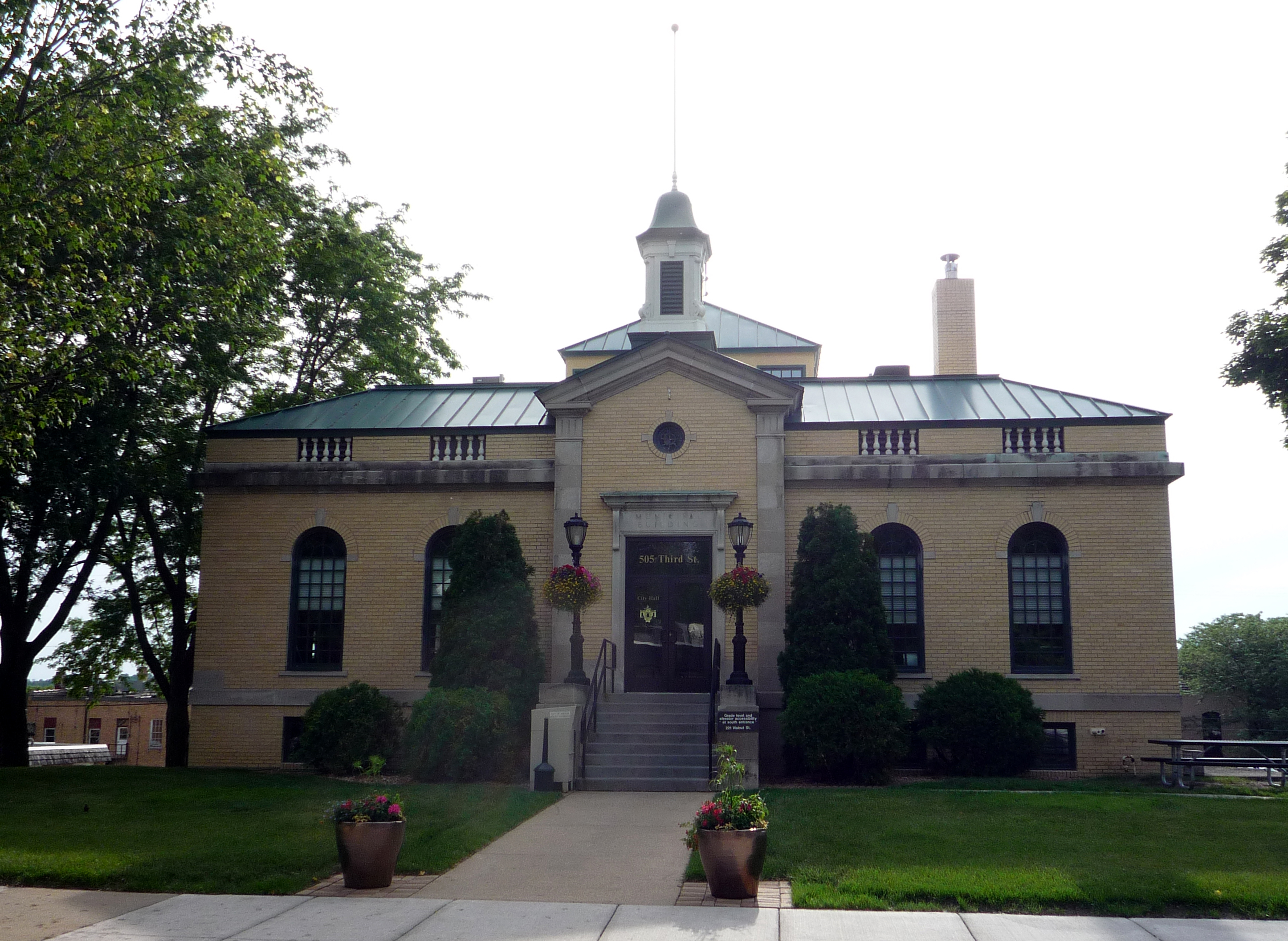
City Hall

Hudson is served by the Hudson Police Department, the Hudson Fire Department, and Lakeview EMS. These agencies respond to about 400 fire calls, 2000 EMS and rescue calls, and 5000 police calls annually.

== Transportation ==
Hudson has no public airports, though residents have access to the New Richmond Regional Airport and the St. Paul Downtown Airport for general aviation, and the Minneapolis–Saint Paul International Airport (MSP) for commercial and international flights. There is an airport shuttle from Hudson to MSP.

== Notable people ==
- Benjamin Allen, Wisconsin state senator
- Lynn H. Ashley, member of the Wisconsin State Assembly
- Julius Beer, member of the Wisconsin State Assembly
- Jim Bertelsen, National Football League player
- Todd Bol, Little Free Library founder
- Philo Boyden, member of the Wisconsin State Assembly
- George W. Chinnock, member of the Wisconsin State Assembly
- John A. Chinnock, member of the Wisconsin State Assembly
- Harvey Clapp, member of the Wisconsin State Assembly
- Moses E. Clapp, U.S. senator from Minnesota
- Otis Clymer, Major League Baseball player
- Richard H. Cosgriff, Medal of Honor recipient
- Thomas Cleland Dawson, diplomat
- Eliza B. K. Dooley, artist, writer, government official in Puerto Rico
- Davis Drewiske, professional hockey player
- James A. Frear, U.S. representative
- David C. Fulton, member of the Wisconsin State Assembly
- Marcus Fulton, Wisconsin state senator
- Phil Gallivan, baseball player
- Jay R. Hinckley, member of the Wisconsin State Assembly
- John Huot, member of the Minnesota House of Representatives
- James B. Hughes, politician, abolitionist, lawyer
- Donald L. Iverson, member of the Wisconsin State Assembly
- Andrew P. Kealy, member of the Wisconsin State Assembly
- Arthur D. Kelly, member of the Wisconsin State Assembly
- Max Malanaphy, drag queen
- Pamela Matson, Stanford scientist
- Jason Naidyhorski, United States Navy admiral
- Frank Nye, U.S. representative from Minnesota
- Ted Odenwald, baseball player
- Wilder Penfield, neurosurgeon pioneer
- William Henry Phipps, Wisconsin state senator
- Thomas Porter, member of the Wisconsin State Assembly
- Bobby Reis, baseball player
- Kitty Rhoades, member of the Wisconsin State Assembly
- Barry Rose, professional football player
- Bjørn Selander, racing cyclist
- John Coit Spooner, United States senator
- Philip Loring Spooner, tenor singer
- Horace Adolphus Taylor, Wisconsin state senator
- Kraig Urbik, professional football player
- Anna Wilgren, professional hockey player

== See also ==
- Hudson (town), Wisconsin - town surrounding the City of Hudson
- Citizens for the St. Croix Valley political organization
