= George Oakes (American politician) =

American politician

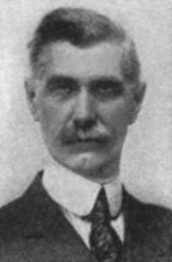

Member of the Wisconsin State Assembly
- In office 1919–1923

Personal details
- Born: April 21, 1861 St. Croix County, Wisconsin, US
- Died: April 19, 1937 (aged 75) New Richmond, Wisconsin, US
- Party: Republican
- Education: University of Minnesota Law School
- Occupation: Lawyer, politician

George Oakes (April 21, 1861 – April 19, 1937) was an American lawyer and politician.

== Biography ==
Born on a farm near New Richmond, Wisconsin, Oakes received his law degree from University of Minnesota Law School. He then practiced law in New Richmond, Wisconsin. He was the New Richmond city attorney and served on the St. Croix County, Wisconsin Board of Supervisors. A Republican, he served in the Wisconsin State Assembly from 1919 to 1923.

Oakes died of heart disease in New Richmond on April 19, 1937.
