= Jason Naidyhorski =

Jason Naidyhorski is a Rear Admiral in the United States Navy. He is Vice Commander and Director of the Maritime Partnership Program of the United States Sixth Fleet.

== Career ==
A native of Hudson, Wisconsin, Jason Naidyhorski graduated from the University of Wisconsin-Madison and entered the Navy through its Reserve Officers' Training Corps. After completing his training as an F/A-18 Hornet pilot, Naidyhorski was assigned to VFA-195 and stationed at Naval Air Facility Atsugi in Japan, where he was attached to Carrier Air Wing Five and Carrier Strike Group 5. Later, he was deployed for Operation Southern Watch and the Iraq War aboard the USS Kitty Hawk (CV-63).

Afterward, Naidyhorski was assigned to VFA-106 as an instructor pilot and a demonstration pilot. He also attended the Naval War College. Following his transfer to reserve status, Naidyhorski was deployed to serve in the War in Afghanistan.

His other tours have included being Reserve Chief of Staff with the United States Fleet Forces Command and time with Joint Force Command Norfolk of NATO. Among the decorations Naidyhorski has received have been the Legion of Merit, the Defense Meritorious Service Medal, the Meritorious Service Medal and the Air Medal with Combat "V".
