= Lynn H. Ashley =

American lawyer and politician (1885–1974)

Lynn H. Ashley (December 23, 1885 – April 21, 1974) was an American lawyer and politician.

Born in River Falls, Wisconsin, Ashley received his bachelor's degree from Carleton College and his law degree from University of Minnesota Law School. Ashley then practiced law in Hudson, Wisconsin and served as district attorney of St. Croix County, Wisconsin in 1921 and 1922. In 1925, Ashley served in the Wisconsin State Assembly and was a Republican. Later Ashley also served on the Wisconsin Public Service Commission. Ashley died in River Falls, Wisconsin.
