= Julius Beer (politician) =

American politician (1843–1927)

Julius Beer (November 28, 1843 – January 12, 1927) was a member of the Wisconsin State Assembly.

Beer was born in the Kingdom of Saxony. In 1869, he settled on a farm in Hudson, Wisconsin. Later, he expanded the farm into St. Joseph, Wisconsin and become involved in other businesses. Also in 1869, Beer married Ellen Thaka. They had six children.

== Political career ==
Beer was elected to the Assembly in 1904, where he served on the committee for town and county organization. Other positions he held include chairman (similar to mayor) and town clerk of St. Joseph. He was a Republican.
