= Eliza B. K. Dooley =

American government official

- Eliza B. K. Dooley, from a 1933 newspaper photo
- Born: Eliza Bellows King; May 31, 1880; Hudson, Wisconsin
- Died: August 7, 1958 (aged 78); Condado, Puerto Rico
- Other name: Elisa B. K. Dooley
- Occupations: Government official, artist, writer
- Known for: Puerto Rican Cook Book (1948)
- Political party: Democratic

Eliza Bellows King Dooley (May 31, 1880 – August 7, 1958), also seen as Elisa B. K. Dooley, was an American government official, artist, and writer. She was appointed US District Commissioner of Immigration and Naturalization Service in San Juan, Puerto Rico in 1933.

== Early life ==
Eliza Bellows King was born in Hudson, Wisconsin, the daughter of Charles Frederick King and Ella Frances Hoyt King. She graduated from Hudson High School in 1900. She studied art and taught piano and organ as a young woman.

== Career ==
Dooley visited her brother in Puerto Rico as a young woman, and moved there with her new husband in 1904. She was appointed US District Commissioner of Immigration in San Juan, Puerto Rico in 1933. In 1933, she was "slightly injured" when a rock was thrown at her car, and struck her, during a gasoline strike. She was an alternate delegate to the Democratic National Conventions in 1924, 1928, 1932 (unable to attend), and 1940, representing Puerto Rico.

Dooley painted landscapes and seascapes in Puerto Rico; her paintings and etchings were published as postcards and exhibited in New York. She also wrote about Puerto Rico, in her books The Old Churches of San Juan (1935), Puerto Rican Cookbook (1948, illustrated by Dooley, with an introduction by Muna Lee), and Old San Juan (1955, illustrated by Dooley). She created at least two maps, "Old World Porto Rico" and "Cuba Ever Faithful Isle" (1941). In 1942, she presented on "Puerto Rican Folk Traditions" at the National Folk Festival in Washington, D.C.

Dooley donated military items and family letters to the Wisconsin Historical Society in the 1940s. She was regent of the Puerto Rican chapter of the Daughters of the American Revolution.

== Personal life ==
Eliza B. King married Henry Williamson Dooley, a businessman from Brooklyn, in 1904. He died in 1932. They had a daughter, Mary. Eliza B. K. Dooley died in 1958, in Condado, Puerto Rico, and her grave is in the Puerto Rico National Cemetery at Bayamón.
