= Glover, Wisconsin =

- Unincorporated community
- Location within Wisconsin Location within the United States
- Coordinates: 44°54′47″N 92°40′50″W
- Country: United States
- State: Wisconsin
- County: St. Croix
- Elevation: 981 ft (299 m)
- Time zone: UTC-6 (Central (CST))
  - Summer (DST): UTC-5 (CDT)
- Area codes: 715 & 534
- GNIS feature ID: 1581636

Glover is an unincorporated community in the town of Troy, St. Croix County, Wisconsin, United States.

== History ==
The community was named for J. E. Glover, a lumberman.
