= John A. Chinnock =

American politician

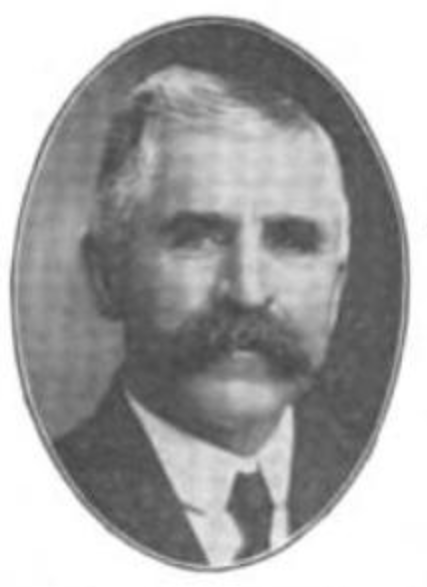

Member of the Wisconsin State Assembly
- In office 1908–1918
- Constituency: St. Croix County, Wisconsin

Personal details
- Born: March 23, 1850 Trumbull County, Ohio
- Died: September 27, 1937 (aged 87)
- Party: Republican
- Occupation: Farmer, politician

John A. Chinnock (March 23, 1850 – September 27, 1937) was a Republican member of the Wisconsin State Assembly.

== Biography ==
Chinnock was born on March 23, 1850, in Trumbull County, Ohio. The following year, he moved to Troy, St. Croix County, Wisconsin. He would later own two farms there before moving to Hudson, Wisconsin in 1906. Chinnock died in Hudson on September 27, 1937.

== Political career ==
Chinnock was a member of the Assembly during the 1909, 1913 and 1917 sessions. Additionally, he was Chairman (similar to Mayor) of Troy and chairman of the county board of supervisors of St. Croix County, Wisconsin.

His brother, George W. Chinnock, was also Chairman of Troy and a member of the Assembly.
