= William Henry Phipps =

American politician (1846–1924)

William Henry Phipps (June 26, 1846 – July 12, 1924) was an English-born American politician who served as member of the Wisconsin State Senate.

== Biography ==
Phipps was born on June 26, 1846, in England. He moved to Manitowoc, Wisconsin, in 1855 and to Hudson, Wisconsin, in 1875. Phipps worked as a land commissioner with the Chicago, St. Paul, Minneapolis and Omaha Railway.

== Political career ==
Phipps was elected to the Senate in 1890 and re-elected in 1892. He had previously been Supervisor of Hudson from 1885 to 1886 and Mayor of Hudson from 1886 to 1889. Phipps was a Republican. Phipps owned "extensive lumber interests" in British Columbia and along the Pacific coast.

Phipps died in his home, at his dinner table, two weeks past his 78th birthday. He was survived by his wife and one son.
