= John S. Moffat House =

Historic house in Wisconsin, United States

- The Octagon House Museum
- U.S. National Register of Historic Places
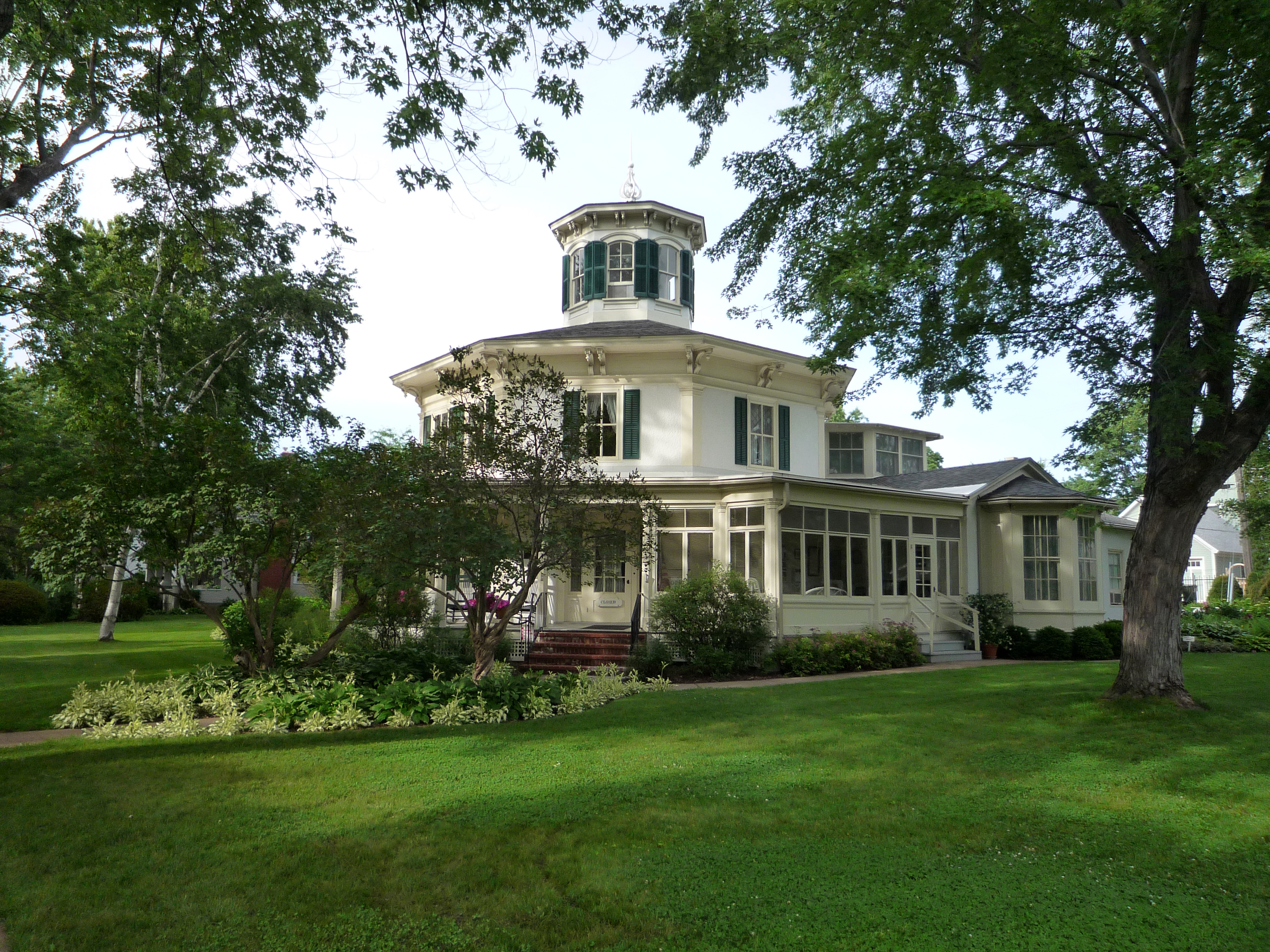

- Location within Wisconsin Location within the United States
- Location: 1004 3rd Street, Hudson, Wisconsin
- Coordinates: 44°58′51″N 92°45′19″W
- Built: 1855
- Architect: Andrews Brothers
- Architectural style: Greek Revival, Octagon Mode
- NRHP reference No.: 74000124
- Added to NRHP: July 18, 1974

The Octagon House Museum, also known as the John Moffat House, is a stucco octagonal house in Hudson, in the U.S. state of Wisconsin. The home was built in 1855 by John Moffatt (1814 Etna, New York-1903 Hudson, Wisconsin) and his wife, Nancy Bennet (1822-1894), who had moved to Hudson from Ithaca, New York the previous year with their ten-year-old daughter. Typical for the time, the Moffats traveled by train to Galena, Illinois where they took a steamboat to Prescott, Wisconsin. Then they traveled by horse and wagon, north to Hudson, which was a prosperous frontier town on the Saint Croix River, benefiting from lumber and flour mills. Two of Nancy's sisters already lived in the community when they arrived. Moffat initially was clerk of the United States General Land Office for the Chippewa District and later practiced law before being elected a Saint Croix County judge in 1869. Their home is listed on the National Register of Historic Places.

The house is now owned and operated by the Hudson Area History Connection as the Octagon House Museum, a historic house museum furnished in mid-19th-century style. The society purchased the home in 1964.
