= Citizens for the St. Croix Valley =

American right-wing political group

- Citizens for the Saint Croix Valley
- Formation: January 2017
- Purpose: Education; Opposition to immigration

Citizens for the St. Croix Valley is a right-wing political organization that is located and operates in the Saint Croix River Valley within the states of Wisconsin and Minnesota.

== History ==
The organization gained momentum during December 2016 with growing opposition against a potential plan by St. Patrick Church to resettle Syrian refugees in Hudson, Wisconsin. This led to the organization officially being formed in January 2017, with a support base within Hudson and New Richmond, Wisconsin. In 2018, it was reported that the Southern Poverty Law Center added the organization to a list of hate groups for a period of time before being removed.

== See also ==
- Republican Party of Wisconsin
- Republican Party of Minnesota
- Hudson High School (Wisconsin)
- Upper Midwest
- Nordic and Scandinavian Americans
