= English Ceramic Circle =

The English Ceramic Circle is a Registered Charity whose aim is to advance knowledge by presenting new research on ceramic history at meetings and by publishing this research. Founded as the English Porcelain Circle in 1927, the name was changed in 1931 to the English Ceramic Circle. The English Ceramic Circle is based in London and publishes a substantial journal of Transactions each year as well as occasional specialist studies. Membership is open to all and the Circle's worldwide membership embraces collectors, curators, archaeologists, potters, auctioneers, dealers, social historians and all those with an interest in the history of ceramics made in the British Isles.

In 1977 the English Ceramic Circle's 50th Anniversary was marked by a publication sponsored by Sotheby Parke Bernet & Company which celebrated English earthenwares and porcelains produced between 1580 and 1830.

== Bibliography ==
R J Charleston and Donald Towner, English Ceramics 1580–1830: A Commemorative Catalogue to celebrate the 50th Anniversary of the English Ceramic Circle 1927–1977. London, Sotheby Parke Bernet Publications 1977.
