= Edwin Rohl =

American politician (1908–1996)

Edwin Clement Rohl (July 15, 1908 – December 3, 1996) was an American farmer and politician.

Born in the town of Troy, in St. Croix County, Wisconsin, Rohl owned a farm. He served on the Pierce Valley Board of Education (similar to school board). Rohl also served in the Wisconsin State Assembly in 1959, as a Democrat. He died in River Falls, Wisconsin.
