= George W. Chinnock =

American politician

George W. Chinnock (1841-1925) was a Republican member of the Wisconsin State Assembly.

== Biography ==
Chinnock was born on December 1, 1841, in England. During the American Civil War, he served with the 37th Wisconsin Volunteer Infantry Regiment of the Union Army, achieving the rank of first sergeant. He died in 1925.

== Political career ==
Chinnock was elected to the Assembly in 1890. Additionally, he was Chairman (similar to Mayor), Treasurer and Assessor of the town of Troy.

His brother, John A. Chinnock, was also Chairman of Troy and a member of the Assembly.
