= New Richmond Regional Airport =

- IATA: RNH; ICAO: KRNH; FAA LID: RNH

Summary
- Owner/Operator: City of New Richmond
- Location: New Richmond, Wisconsin
- Elevation AMSL: 998 ft / 304 m
- Coordinates: 45°8.866′N 092°32.347′W

Map
- Location of airport in Wisconsin RNH (the United States)

Runways
Direction	Length		Surface
Direction	ft	m	Surface
14/32	5,507	1,679	Asphalt
4/22	2,050	627	Turf

Statistics
- Aircraft operations (2021): 44,500
- Based aircraft (2024): 242
- Source: Federal Aviation Administration

New Richmond Regional Airport (ICAO: KRNH, FAA LID: RNH) is a large general aviation airport located in the city of New Richmond, Wisconsin, United States. The airport is owned by the City of New Richmond and operated by a seven member airport commission. It is included in the Federal Aviation Administration (FAA) National Plan of Integrated Airport Systems for 2025–2029, in which it is categorized as a regional general aviation facility. The State of Wisconsin classifies the airport as a large general aviation airport in the State Airport System Plan 2030.

The airport is located in western Wisconsin approximately 30 miles (48 km) northeast of Minneapolis-St. Paul. 275 aircraft are based in 123 privately owned hangars. The airport is home to eighteen aviation related businesses and several dozen business aircraft. The airport contributes millions of dollars per year to the New Richmond area and East Metro economy. The airport serves the Eastern Twin Cities Metro Area and Western Wisconsin, including the popular attractions Cedar Lake Speedway and Somerset recreation areas.

The airport serves a population base estimated at 175,000 people, including the following municipalities: New Richmond, Hudson, River Falls, Baldwin, Hammond, Woodville, Glenwood City, Amery, Clear Lake, Somerset, and Stillwater, MN.

New Richmond Regional Airport is the only public use airport in St. Croix County.

== History ==
The airport was commissioned by the FAA in July 1964 with a 3,000-foot (910 m) primary runway (Runway 13-31) and a 2,100-foot (640 m) turf runway (Runway 4-22).

In 1992, a major construction project was completed. The primary runway was demolished and replaced by a new 4,003-foot (1,220 m) runway (Runway 14-32). The original hangar area located on the south end of the airport was also updated to allow additional hangars. A new aircraft parking apron was also constructed.

In 1998, an additional taxi lane was added to the south hangar area. The hangar area was completely filled by the end of 1998 with 45 hangars.

In 2000, a new hangar area was constructed on the north end of the airport. The new area accommodated a mix of 32 small and medium-sized hangars. A full-length parallel taxiway to runway 14-32 was also completed along with a small apron.

In 2001, a second addition to the north aircraft parking apron was completed.

In 2004, a corporate/business aviation hangar area was added to the north hangar area allowing the construction of up to seven large hangars. A third addition to the aircraft parking apron in the north hangar area was completed. An additional taxiway was also added to the north hangar area to accommodate additional private hangars. A grant from the Department of Homeland Security allowed the construction of a security fence and three automated security gates around the airport.

In 2005, two new taxiways were added to the north hangar area to allow an additional 14 private and corporate hangars.

In 2006, construction began on an extension to the 4,003-foot (1,220 m) primary runway and parallel taxiway to runway 14-32. The runway was completed in June 2007 and the parallel taxiway was completed in August 2007. The runway is now 5,507 feet (1,679 m) long. A helicopter landing apron and a connecting taxiway in the corporate hangar area were also completed as part of the 2006-2007 project.

In 2008, the airport completed the purchase of over 60 acres (240,000 m^{2}) adjoining the north side of the airport. The land will be used for future economic development. Reconstruction of the oldest portion of the primary runway started on September 8, along with the replacement and upgrading of the runway lighting system. Blast/overrun pads were installed on each end of the primary runway. A connecting taxiway in the corporate hangar area was also constructed. The runway was reopened for operations on October 4.

In 2010, a taxiway, taxi lane and access road serving the northeast side of the airport was completed. The project provided the necessary infrastructure for future aviation related businesses. Additional security fencing and gates were also part of the 2010 project.

In 2025, the south hangar area pavement originally installed in the fall of 1992 underwent a major reconstruction beginning on April 21. The existing asphalt was removed along with several inches of unsuitable sub-base. New material was added and four inches of asphalt pavement was installed. The project was substantially completed on June 21 approximately $150,000 under budget and five working days ahead of schedule.

The airport began developing an airport master plan in 2023. Engineering firm Short Elliott Hendrickson Inc. (SEH) was selected by the Wisconsin Bureau of Aeronautics for this task. Phase one of the master plan is complete. Phase two will begin following approval of the forecast data from the FAA.

The airport is in the planning stages for the reconstruction of taxiway Alpha and the creation of the east hangar area that will bring nineteen 60'x60' hangars and twelve or more corporate size hangars in 2027. The project is being designed by SEH.

== Airport businesses ==
East Metro Jet Center (full and self service fuel including 100LL, Jet A, aircraft deicing, ground handling, cargo handling, GPU, lav service, potable water service, Corporate Aircraft Association (CAA) member), Divvy Jet (aircraft leasing), Eagle Air (aircraft sales), Elevated Aircraft (aircraft sales), Link Aviation (flight training), Indianhead Airways (piston and turbine aircraft maintenance), Perceptive Avionics (avionics sales and service), New Richmond Aero (piston aircraft maintenance), Northern Airways (aircraft charter using locally based Citation Jet aircraft), Proto Type Machine / Aerospace Hydraulics (precision made aircraft parts), Mike Demulling Flight Instruction (primary and advanced flight training), NDT Solutions (non-destructive testing and equipment manufacturing), New Richmond Airside Rental (rental vehicles for passengers and crew), Strix Aero (Engine and carb overhaul), Super Clean Aircraft (professional aircraft detailing service)and Top Flight Avionics (avionics installs and service).

== Airport operations ==
The airport is funded from lease fees for hangar lots and taxes on the hangars. No additional non airport produced funds are used to operate the airport.

New Richmond Regional Airport covers an area of 444 acres (180 ha) at an elevation of 998 feet (304 m) above mean sea level.

In June 2024, there were 242 aircraft based at this airport: 195 single-engine, 24 multi-engine, 7 jet, 4 helicopter, 1 glider, 6 military and 5 ultra-light.

The airport created an on-site fire department with the addition of an E-One Titan aircraft rescue and firefighting (ARFF) vehicle in February 2022. The vehicle entered service in the spring of 2022 and is staffed by airport personnel and New Richmond Fire and Rescue.

Airport personnel provide 24 hour coverage for snow and ice removal on all airport surfaces. As of August 2025, the snow removal fleet consisted of 3 single axle dump trucks with 12 foot plows and 9 foot wings, 1 single axle dump truck with 12 foot plow, 1 reserve dump truck with 12 foot plow, Two 14 foot MB Companies runway sweepers, a 16 foot pusher plow, a Cat 950 loader, a New Holland TV-145 bi-directional industrial tool carrier tractor, and a 5,000 ton per hour Wausau snow blower mounted on an Oshkosh chassis. A New Holland T-8 industrial tractor with 20 foot ramp plow, 14' MB Companies runway sweeper, and 1,100 ton per hour Fair Manufacturing snow blower were added to the fleet in February 2023. The airport also utilizes a 15' wide, trailer-mounted boom sprayer for application of E-36 runway deicing fluid to primary runway 14-32.

The airport is considered the largest in Wisconsin due to the significant number of based aircraft as well as the number of hangars on site, which total 123 existing or under-construction hangars as of August 2025.

The airport has a seaplane ramp that was reconstructed as part of the south hangar area project in 2025, that provides aircraft access to Hatfield Lake on the south side of the facility. Water runway 5-23 measures 3,500' x 250' and water runway 18-36 measures 3,000' x 400'.

== Weather ==
The airport has an on-site Automated Weather Observation Station (AWOS) providing continuous aviation weather METAR reports. In the event of an AWOS outage, manual weather observations are recorded by trained weather observers. In August 2006, the National Weather Service in Chanhassen, MN began issuing Terminal Aerodrome Forecasts (TAF) for New Richmond Regional Airport.

== Instrument approaches ==
The airport has two precision LPV GPS / RNAV approaches. The non-directional beacon (NDB) call sign WRLB2195, frequency 257 KHz with Morse Code identifier RNH, became obsolete with the implementation of the RNAV approaches and was turned off on January 3, 2012, and is now decommissioned. The aviation ground station license was allowed to lapse. The two 55' tall antenna towers were removed and the orange and white radio transmitter building was dismantled in the summer of 2013.

== Air shows ==
Air shows were held each June from 2004 through 2007. No air show was held in 2008 due to various ongoing airport construction projects. In 2009, the air show was converted into a fly-in event held is now held annually each May.

== See also ==
- List of airports in Wisconsin
