= Donald Chisholm Towner =

British painter (1903–1985)

Donald Chisholm Towner (born Eastbourne, East Sussex, England, 1903; died London 1985) was a collector and historian of British ceramics and painter. He is noted for his championship of creamware and his ground-breaking studies of this ceramic type in particular.

== Early life ==
Donald Towner was born in Eastbourne in 1903, the youngest of four boys. His father William was a teacher and amateur artist who inspired his interest in nature and art. Donald's great-uncle, John Chisolm Towner, enabled through a legacy the founding of the Towner Art Gallery in Eastbourne.

Donald Towner went to school as a boarder in 1915 at Southdown College, Willingdon and the attended Eastbourne Municipal School, where he first met Eric Ravilious, later gaining a scholarship to the Eastbourne School of Art with Ravilious in 1920. He also attended life drawing classes at Brighton School of Art. Both Towner and Ravilious received further scholarships in 1923 to study at the Royal College of Art in London, graduating with a Diploma in 1926.

== Early career as an artist ==
After graduation from the Royal College of Art, Towner-based himself in London where he first took a studio in Mornington Crescent. He then moved to Holly Hill in Hampstead in 1927 with his mother, who had sold the family home in Eastbourne and bought a house there. He rented a studio nearby and stayed at Holly Hill for ten years before moving to 8 Church Row, Hampstead in 1937, a terrace house dating to the early eighteenth century. It was at Church Row that Towner first came to appreciate antiques and developed his love for British pottery.

His first one-man exhibition was held at the Leicester Galleries, Leicester Square, London in 1938.

== Second World War ==
Towner spent the war years between 1939 and 1945 in the South Downs where he combined agricultural work with commissions for paintings from Bibby, an animal feed company and local farmers. In 1943 he took charge of the Art School at Christ's Hospital, Horsham where he stayed until the end of the war.

Towner painted mainly in oil, using watercolour for sketches. He is perhaps best known for his paintings of buildings and street scenes, but he also painted nature in an around the South Downs where he grew up and spent the war years, as well as country houses in the region and a few portrait paintings. Several representative works are to be found in UK public collections.

== Beginnings as a collector ==
Towner's interest in collecting ceramics is thought to have started in earnest once he returned to his home at 8 Church Row, Hampstead after the war. A next-door neighbour was Egan Mew, a noted collector and writer of the time and it is possible he guided Towner's early interests. Towner also knew Lord Shelburne, a collector of British and European ceramics whose home at Hinton Ampner he painted a number of times in the 1930s.

== Ceramic historian ==
Donald Towner is today chiefly remembered as an historian of ceramics and in particular for his championship of creamware and his ground-breaking studies of this ceramic type. It has been noted that ‘before Donald Towner there was little or no collective use of the term creamware’. His first book, English Cream-Coloured Earthenware, published in 1957, was the first study devoted to the subject. This was later substantially revised as Creamware in 1978. In 1963 he published The Leeds Pottery, an important study of Leeds-produced creamware.

Scholars have since gone on to develop his ideas and sometimes challenge his conclusions whilst considerable progress has been made in identifying individual factory output or even individual potters. However, he remains the acknowledged authority of his day.

In 1947 he was elected a member of the English Ceramic Circle, a body devoted to the research of ceramic history (founded in 1927 as the English Porcelain Circle and renamed in 1931), and was for many years a Vice President of the London-based organisation. In 1977 he produced a catalogue in celebration of the ECC's Golden Jubilee together with Robert Charleston, formerly keeper of ceramics at the Victoria and Albert Museum, London.

Donald Towner continued to paint, exhibit and teach art throughout his life. In 1979 he published a memoir entitled Recollections of a Landscape Painter & Pottery Collector: an Autobiography. He died in 1985.

== Bibliography: Works by Donald Towner ==
English Cream-Coloured Earthenware, London, Faber & Faber, 1957 ISBN 978-0571028795

Creamware, London, Faber & Faber, 1978. ISBN 0-571-04964-8 (A fully revised edition of Towner 1957.)

The Leeds Pottery, London, Cory, Adams & Mackay 1963.

(With R J Charleston) English Ceramics, 1580-1830: A commemorative catalogue to celebrate the 50th Anniversary of the English Ceramic Circle, 1927-1977. London, Sotheby Parke Bernet, 1977.

Towner, Donald C (1979). Recollections of a landscape painter and pottery collector: an autobiography. New York: Born-Hawes Publishing Limited. OCLC 651971201.
