= Edward Colman (American politician) =

American politician and Union Army officer (1828–1898)

Member of the Wisconsin Senate from the 18th district
- In office January 1, 1882 – January 1, 1885
- Preceded by: George Eaton Sutherland
- Succeeded by: James Franklin Ware

Sheriff of Fond du Lac County
- In office January 1, 1878 – January 1, 1880
- Preceded by: Hazen R. Hill
- Succeeded by: Neil C. Bell

Personal details
- Born: July 28, 1828 Rochester, New York
- Died: September 4, 1898 (aged 70) Sheboygan, Wisconsin
- Cause of death: Apoplexy
- Party: Republican
- Spouse: Susan Phillips
- Children: John D. Colman; (Mrs. A. L. Moore)
- Relatives: Cornelia (Bragg) (sister)

Military service
- Allegiance: United States
- Branch/service: United States Volunteers; Union Army
- Years of service: 1862–1865
- Rank: Colonel, USV
- Commands: 49th Reg. Wis. Vol. Infantry
- Battles/wars: American Civil War: Battle of Shiloh (WIA); Battle of Jackson, Mississippi; Battle of Champion Hill (WIA)

Edward Colman (July 28, 1828 – September 4, 1898) was an American engineer, farmer, politician and Union Army officer in the American Civil War. He served one term in the Wisconsin State Senate as a Republican.

== Early life ==
Colman was born on July 28, 1828, in Rochester, New York, a city co-founded by his grandfather, Colonel Nathaniel Rochester. As a young man, he trained as a civil engineer and worked on the Erie Canal. He moved to Empire, Wisconsin, in 1852, at age 24, and took up farming, though he continued to look for work as an engineer.

== Civil War service ==
In the fall of 1861, after the outbreak of the American Civil War, Colman assisted in raising a company of volunteers to answer President Abraham Lincoln's call for three-year enlistments. Colman was made 1st Lieutenant of his company, which became Company A of the 18th Wisconsin Volunteer Infantry Regiment. The regiment mustered into service on March 15, 1862, under Colonel James S. Alban, who selected Lieutenant Colman as Adjutant.

The 18th Wisconsin arrived at St. Louis on March 31, and then took barges up the Tennessee River to Pittsburg Landing, Tennessee. The regiment arrived around noon on Saturday, April 5, and were assigned to the command of General Benjamin Prentiss, marching the rest of the day to reach his headquarters, going into camp at dusk without supper. During the night, Confederate forces under Albert Sidney Johnston marched to within two miles of the Union lines and attacked near dawn on Sunday, April 6, the start of the Battle of Shiloh. The regiment was hastily arranged into battle lines. Initially, their left was supported by the 15th Michigan Volunteer Infantry Regiment, but they had not yet been supplied with ammunition and were forced to withdraw as a result. After about two hours of fighting, the entire division began a retreat, it was around this time that Lieutenant Colman was severely wounded when he was shot in the head. He was carried from the field by 2nd Lieutenant Thomas J. Potter, who was also wounded in the battle. Lieutenant Colman's life was likely saved by Potter's action, as he was considered unlikely to survive the head wound. Both Colman and Potter were sent home on medical leave following their injuries. Potter died of his wound five months later. Colman carried the bullet in his head for the rest of his life.

Despite the severity of his injury, Colman was able to return to service with the regiment and participated in the Vicksburg campaign in the spring of 1863. He was present at the Battle of Jackson, Mississippi, and was wounded again at the Battle of Champion Hill. After his second wound, he transitioned to the Veteran Reserve Corps and participated in the recruiting service, first with a recruiting station in Fond du Lac, Wisconsin, then at Madison, Wisconsin, and St. Louis, Missouri, before being sent to Washington, D.C., where he served on the Examining Board.

In January 1865, he was commissioned Lieutenant Colonel for the newly organized 49th Wisconsin Volunteer Infantry Regiment and joined the regiment in Missouri where they engaged in guard duty until the end of the war. The regiment mustered out of service on November 8, 1865. Colman received a promotion to Colonel shortly before mustering out.

== Postbellum career ==
Shortly after the war, Colman was appointed Superintendent of Public Property in Madison and served there for about one and a half years. After that he became involved in the banking industry and was, for nine years, treasurer of the Fond Du Lac Savings Bank. In 1877, Colman returned to Empire, Wisconsin, and was elected Sheriff of Fond du Lac County for a two-year term, running on the Republican Party ticket. He remained in Empire, working as cashier for the Mihills Manufacturing Company and was elected City Treasurer for two terms. In 1881, he was elected to represent Fond du Lac County in the Wisconsin State Senate for the 1882 and 1883 sessions, but with the ratification of changes to senate and assembly terms in 1881, Colman's term was effectively extended through 1884, though no additional legislative business occurred that year.

On September 4, 1898, he died in Sheboygan, Wisconsin, while attending services at Grace Episcopal Church.

== Personal life and family ==
Colman was a grandson of Colonel Nathaniel Rochester, who was the namesake and one of the founders of Rochester, New York. His sister, Cornelia Colman, married Union Army General Edward S. Bragg, of the 6th Wisconsin Volunteer Infantry Regiment, who later became a U.S. Congressman.

Military offices
Preceded by Samuel Fallows	Command of the 49th Wisconsin Volunteer Infantry Regiment; November 1, 1865 – November 8, 1865	Regiment disbanded
Wisconsin Senate
Preceded by George Eaton Sutherland	Member of the Wisconsin Senate from the 18th district January 1, 1882 – January 1, 1885	Succeeded by James Franklin Ware
