= John Day Putnam =

American politician (1837–1904)

John D. Putnam

2nd Mayor of River Falls, Wisconsin
- In office August 1885 – April 1886
- Preceded by: Abraham D. Andrews
- Succeeded by: Jesse B. Thayer

Member of the Wisconsin State Assembly from the Pierce County district
- In office January 1, 1883 – January 5, 1885
- Preceded by: Franklin L. Gilson
- Succeeded by: Jesse B. Thayer

Personal details
- Born: June 19, 1837 Brooklyn, Connecticut, U.S.
- Died: November 20, 1904 (aged 67) Los Angeles County, California, U.S.
- Resting place: Greenwood Cemetery, River Falls, Wisconsin
- Party: Democratic
- Spouse: Catherine Helen Lovell (m. 1859–1904)
- Children: William Hutchinson Putnam^{(b. 1859; died 1936)}; Catherine Eliza Putnam^{(b. 1861; died 1912)}; Sarah Lovell (Dunne)^{(b. 1866; died 1935)}; Charles E. Putnam^{(b. 1869; died 1929)}; Helen Lauraine Putnam^{(b. 1875; died 1876)}; John Day Putnam Jr.^{(b. 1876; died 1951)}; Dana Gold Putnam^{(b. 1877; died 1939)}; Maud McGregor Putnam^{(died 1883)}
- Parent: William H. Putnam (father)
- Relatives: Albert Day Putnam (brother); Israel Putnam (great-great-grandfather)

Military service
- Allegiance: United States
- Branch/service: United States Volunteers; Union Army
- Years of service: 1861–1864
- Rank: Commissary Sergeant
- Unit: 1st Reg. Wis. Vol. Infantry
- Battles/wars: American Civil War

John Day Putnam Sr. (June 19, 1837 – November 20, 1904) was an American miller and Democratic politician, and Wisconsin pioneer. He was the 2nd mayor of River Falls, Wisconsin, and represented Pierce County for one term in the Wisconsin State Assembly, during the 1883 term.

== Early life ==
John Day Putnam was born on June 19, 1837, in Brooklyn, Connecticut. He was raised and educated there, attending the common schools and the state normal school. At age 22, he left home and moved to Wisconsin, settling a farm in the town of Troy, in St. Croix County.

== Civil War service ==
During the first year of the American Civil War, Putnam volunteered for service in the Union Army. He was enrolled as a private in Company F, 1st Wisconsin Infantry Regiment, while that regiment was being reorganized in the summer of 1861. The 1st Wisconsin Infantry left Wisconsin in October 1861, heading to the vicinity of Nashville, Tennessee, for service in the western theater of the war. While in central Tennessee, Putnam was promoted to corporal and color guard for the company, and served in that capacity at the Battle of Perryville in October 1862. Shortly after, he was assigned to wagoner duties, managing the company supply train.

The regiment was engaged in the subsequent skirmishing around central Tennessee and northern Alabama, and retreated to Chattanooga after the Battle of Chickamauga. In March 1864, Putnam was promoted to commissary sergeant for the full regiment, and served in that capacity until the end of his three-year enlistment, in October 1864.

== Political career ==
After his war service, Putnam returned to his farm and became involved in local affairs in the town of Troy. He was elected assessor, town treasurer, and served two years as chairman of the town board.

In 1873, he began renting a mill in nearby River Falls, and the next year purchased an ownership stake in the mill. That year, he moved to a new homestead in the town of River Falls. He continued his political activity there, serving six years as chairman of the town board of River Falls. As town chairman, he was ex officio a member of the Pierce County board of supervisors, and served three years as chairman of the county board.

During these years, Putnam was involved in the Reform Party movement in the Democratic Party. He was on the Democratic presidential elector slate for the 1880 United States presidential election, though Wisconsin voters ultimately chose the Republican slate that year.

In 1882, Putnam was selected as the Democratic nominee for Wisconsin State Assembly in the Pierce County district. In the general election, he narrowly defeated his Republican opponent, Calvin Randall Morse, winning by just 31 votes. Putnam ran well ahead of the rest of the Democratic ticket, as Republican state senate candidate Hans Warner carried Pierce County by 1,000 votes.

Putnam ran for re-election in 1884, but lost badly to River Falls normal school professor Jesse B. Thayer. The following spring, the city of River Falls was incorporated and elected their first mayor, Abraham D. Andrews. Andrews died just a few months later and a special election was called to replace him. Putnam ran for mayor and defeated Republican nominee J. W. Bradshaw. In the Spring of 1886, Putnam ran for re-election as mayor, but faced Jesse B. Thayer again, who defeated him again.

Despite his recent electoral setbacks, the 1886 Democratic state convention voted to name him as their nominee for Lieutenant Governor of Wisconsin, over former state senator Enos Eastman. Putnam's pick was described by newspapers at the time as owing to his popularity in the western part of the state. Putnam lost the election to Republican George Washington Ryland, but polled slightly better than the Democratic gubernatorial candidate Gilbert M. Woodward.

Putnam's allies widely circulated his name as a candidate for governor in 1887 and 1888, and Putnam made no effort to dissuade that campaign. Putnam took a significant pool of supportive delegates into the Democratic state convention in September 1888. His opponent for the gubernatorial nomination was Milwaukee businessman James Morgan. As the roll call vote proceeded, it was clear Putnam only had support from the northwest quadrant of the state; his name was withdrawn from nomination, allowing Morgan to be unanimously nominated.

== Later years ==
After losing the gubernatorial nomination in 1888, Putnam largely retired from electoral politics. But when Grover Cleveland was elected to his second term as president, Putnam received an appointment as captain of the watch of the United States Treasury Department. Putnam served a year in that role, and was then appointed a "Chinese inspector" in California. He served as an immigration commissioner in southern California for the rest of his life.

He died in Los Angeles County on November 20, 1904. His body was returned to River Falls for burial.

== Personal life and family ==
John Day Putnam was one of at least seven children born to Dr. William H. Putnam and his wife Eliza (née Day). William H. Putnam was a prominent farmer and physician in Brooklyn, Connecticut, and served in the state legislature. He was a direct descendant (great-grandson) of American Revolutionary War general Israel Putnam. They were members of the Putnam family, descendants of the Putnams who settled at Salem village, Massachusetts Bay Colony.

John's younger brother, William, also enlisted in the Union Army; he served in the 12th Connecticut Infantry Regiment and died at the Battle of Cedar Creek in 1864. Another younger brother, Albert Day Putnam, was elected to the Connecticut House of Representatives.

John D. Putnam married Catherine Helen Lovell in March 1859. They had at least eight children and were married for 45 years before his death in 1904.

Their eldest son, William H. Putnam, ran for Wisconsin Senate in the 10th Senate district in 1890, but lost to Republican William Henry Phipps.

== Electoral history ==
=== Wisconsin Assembly (1882, 1884) ===
Year	Election	Date	Elected				Defeated				Total	Plurality
1882	General	Nov. 7	John D. Putnam	Democratic	1,373	50.57%	C. R. Morse	Rep.	1,342	49.43%	2,715	31
1884	General	Nov. 4	Jesse B. Thayer	Republican	2,411	63.72%	John D. Putnam (inc)	Dem.	1,373	36.28%	3,784	1,038

=== Wisconsin Lieutenant Governor (1886) ===
Wisconsin Lieutenant Gubernatorial Election, 1886
Party	Candidate	Votes	%	±%
General Election, November 2, 1886
Republican	George W. Ryland	131,063	45.75%	−4.90pp
Democratic	John D. Putnam	116,424	40.64%	−4.73pp
Union Labor	George A. Loyd	21,772	7.60%	
Prohibition	Charles Alexander	17,188	6.00%	+3.37pp
Plurality		14,639	5.11%	-0.17pp
Total votes		286,447	100.0%	-10.46%
Republican hold				

Party political offices
Preceded by A. C. Parkinson	Democratic nominee for Lieutenant Governor of Wisconsin; 1886	Succeeded by Andrew Kull
Wisconsin State Assembly
Preceded by Franklin L. Gilson	Member of the Wisconsin State Assembly from the Pierce County district January 1, 1883 – January 5, 1885	Succeeded by Jesse B. Thayer
Political offices
Preceded by Abraham D. Andrews	Mayor of River Falls, Wisconsin; August 1885 – April 1886	Succeeded by Jesse B. Thayer
