= George Eaton Sutherland =

American lawyer and Milwaukee County Judge

The Honorable George Eaton Sutherland
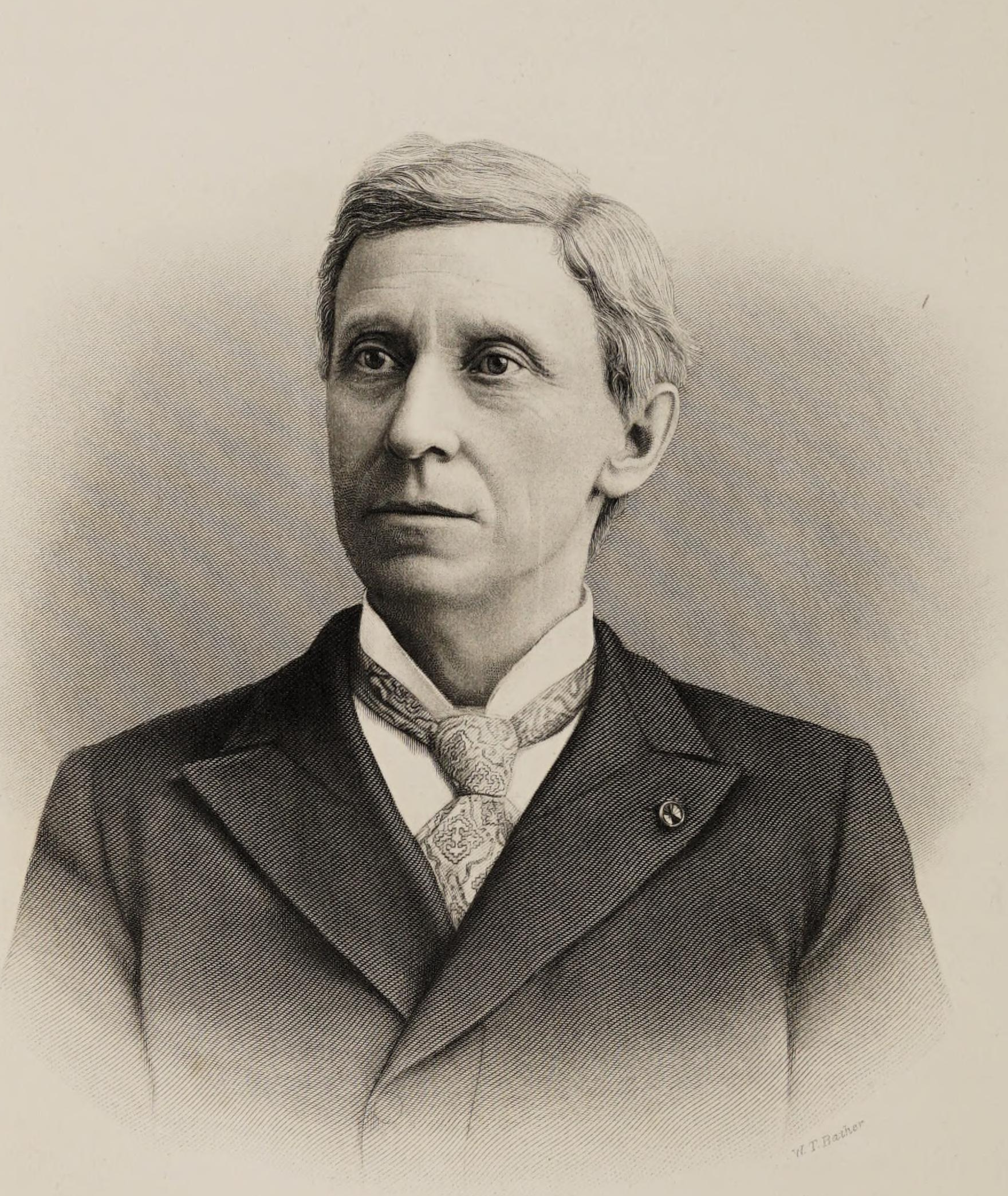

Judge of the Milwaukee Superior Court Branch 2
- In office January 1, 1897 – September 13, 1899
- Preceded by: Robert N. Austin
- Succeeded by: Orrin T. Williams

Member of the Wisconsin Senate from the 18th district
- In office January 1, 1880 – January 1, 1882
- Preceded by: Alonzo A. Loper
- Succeeded by: Edward Colman

Personal details
- Born: September 14, 1843 Burlington, New York, U.S.
- Died: September 13, 1899 (aged 55) Chicago, Illinois, U.S.
- Cause of death: Heart disease
- Resting place: Forest Home Cemetery, Milwaukee, Wisconsin
- Party: Republican
- Spouse: Adela E. Merrell (m. 1871; died 1898)
- Children: Agnes M. (Beebe); (b. 1882; died 1965); Amy M. Sutherland
- Parents: Samuel Waite Sutherland (father); Amy (Smith) Sutherland (mother)
- Education: Ripon College; Amherst College; Columbia Law School
- Profession: lawyer, judge

Military service
- Allegiance: United States
- Branch/service: United States Volunteers; Union Army
- Years of service: 1862–1865
- Rank: Captain, USV
- Unit: 1st Btn. N.Y. Lt. Artillery; 13th Reg. U.S. Colored Heavy Artillery
- Battles/wars: American Civil War

George Eaton Sutherland (September 14, 1843 – September 13, 1899) was an American politician, lawyer, and judge. He served in the Wisconsin State Senate for two years, served as a judge of the Milwaukee Superior Court, and held several local offices in Fond du Lac County, Wisconsin. During the American Civil War, he served as an officer in the Union Army.

== Early life and education ==
Born in Burlington, New York, Sutherland's parents died when he was young. From age seven, he was homeless and drifted between various guardians until age 10, when he went to live with his older brother, Andrew, who was a teacher in Norwich, Connecticut. Andrew was able to give his brother an education, and together they traveled to Waukau, Wisconsin, in 1855. After leaving school, George returned to New York. He taught school there for two years while attending West Westfield Academy.

== Civil War service ==
In September 1862, Sutherland enlisted for service with the Union Army in the American Civil War. He was enrolled in Company A, 1st New York Light Artillery Battalion. They were sent to the defense of Washington, D.C., but did not see combat. During 1863, they were dispatched to Philadelphia and Pottsville, Pennsylvania, to restore order in the midst of draft riots. Sutherland was unhappy with this form of service, so that year obtained permission to attend the Philadelphia Military School, where they were training officers to command "colored" regiments. He received a commission as a captain on July 23, 1864, and was sent to Kentucky to raise volunteers for the 13th U.S. Colored Heavy Artillery Regiment.

While working in Kentucky, he was engaged in fighting at Eddyville, Kentucky, was shot in the arm and captured by the enemy. He was able to escape with the help of a woman, but after arriving at the Union hospital in Clarksville, Tennessee, he became sick with Typhoid fever. He was hospitalized for three months, then returned to service on the staff of the court martial at Lexington, Kentucky, where he remained until mustering out of the service in November 1865.

== Legal and political career ==
After the war, Sutherland returned to school. First at Ripon College, then Amherst College, where he graduated in 1870. He studied law with Judge Willard, in Utica, New York, and completed his legal education in 1871 at Columbia Law School. He was admitted to the State Bar of Wisconsin in 1871 in Oshkosh, Wisconsin, and entered private practice in Ripon, Wisconsin.

In 1872, he became city attorney in Ripon and also served on the Fond du Lac County Board of Supervisors. In 1874, he moved to the city of Fond du Lac, and partnered with Judge David Taylor until he was elected to the Wisconsin Supreme Court in 1878.

In 1879, Sutherland was elected to represent Fond du Lac County in the Wisconsin State Senate on the Republican Party ticket. He also served as postmaster for Fond du Lac from 1883 to 1885, but was removed by President Grover Cleveland for "offensive partisanship."

Sutherland moved to Milwaukee in 1886, and, in 1897, was elected judge of the Milwaukee Superior Court, defeating incumbent Judge Robert N. Austin. He served for two years before his death in 1899.

== Personal life and family ==
Sutherland married Adela Merrell at Kirkland, New York, May 3, 1871. They had at least two daughters together.

Sutherland was a member of the Military Order of the Loyal Legion of the United States and the Grand Army of the Republic.

Sutherland died suddenly of heart disease in Chicago, Illinois, while coming home from a foreign trip.

== Notes ==
Wisconsin Senate
Preceded by Alonzo A. Loper	Member of the Wisconsin Senate from the 18th district 1880 – 1882	Succeeded by Edward Colman
Legal offices
Preceded by Robert N. Austin	Judge of the Milwaukee Superior Court Branch 2; 1897 – 1899	Succeeded by Orrin T. Williams
