= Prescott Transcript =

Newspaper in Wisconsin, USA (1855-1861)

The Prescott Transcript was a weekly newspaper that was published in Prescott, Wisconsin, during 1855–1861. It was a continuation of the Prescott Paraclete, a weekly newspaper that was published from February 14, 1855, until its final issue on September 21, 1855. The first issue of the Prescott Transcript was published on September 28, 1855, as number 32 in the first volume of the newspaper. With seven volumes in total, the final issue of the Prescott Transcript was published on Sept. 14, 1861, and is issue number 29 in volume seven. As with the Prescott Paraclete, Charles E. Young and Oliver Gibbs Jr. served as the initial editors and proprietors of the Prescott Transcript. However, in later issues of the Transcript, the publishers were referred to as Young and Brother Publishers.

In some of the first issues of the Transcript, the slogan of the paper was “Enterprise, Education and Morality, the Essential Elements of Civilization,” which was the same slogan that was used for the Paraclete. In terms of the layout design of the newspaper, the Transcript possesses the same style format as the Paraclete, with six columns occupying four sheets of paper in every issue. On the first page of almost every issue, advertisements occupied the two left-hand columns, while the remaining four columns were devoted to poetry, stories and fables. The second page of the newspaper, in most issues, was the page that contained the majority of the paper's journalistic news, covering topics that might have been of particular interest or concern for residents of Pierce County, Wisconsin, at the time. The third page of the paper consisted heavily of advertisements but also contained short sections of notable information such as the Steamboat Record, which listed the names of the people who arrived at Prescott's Steamboat Landing, along with the date on which they arrived. The fourth page of the paper contained a column with short jokes and puns, a story column, and four remaining columns which were consumed entirely by advertisements.

The office of the Transcript, according to the paper, was originally located at Prescott's Dunbar Building on Front Street, which is the street closest to where the St. Croix River conjoins with the Mississippi River. According to the Transcript, this location was also very close in proximity to Prescott's Steamboat Landing. However, the office of the Transcript was eventually relocated to the Strauss’ Building on Broad Street, which is located just one block over from Front Street. An annual subscription to the Transcript cost $2.00, while the price for purchasing a single issue of the paper cost $.05.

In the final known issue of the Transcript, a business notice appearing on the second page provides information to readers, subscribers and advertisers about immediate adjustments to the office and firm of Young & Brother. Though the notice in the final issue does not explain the reason for the immediate adjustments, page 181 of the Annotated Catalogue of Newspapers from the Wisconsin Historical Society says, “In Sept., 1861, Young enlisted in Federal army.” The page also explains that Lute A. Taylor “under title of River Falls Journal; in Sept., 1861, absorbed Prescott Transcript.” On page 187, the catalogue tells that the River Falls Journal had a suspension in 1861, and in May, “removed to Prescott.”
