= Cornelius A. Davenport =

19th century American politician

Member of the Wisconsin State Assembly from the Waushara County district
- In office January 5, 1891 – January 7, 1895
- Preceded by: William B. La Selle
- Succeeded by: James T. Ellarson

Personal details
- Born: July 3, 1843 Antwerp, New York, U.S.
- Died: 1920 (aged 76–77) Welsh Cemetery, Waushara County
- Party: Republican
- Spouse: Adula Hannah Jaquith (m. 1866; died 1916)
- Children: Willie Davenport^{(b. 1867)}; Libbie Lurena (Kitts)^{(b. 1871; died 1947)}; Elmer Albert Davenport^{(b. 1875; died 1945)}; Mabel H. (Krebs)^{(b. 1883; died 1963)}

Military service
- Allegiance: United States
- Branch/service: United States Volunteers; Union Army
- Years of service: 1862–1865
- Rank: Private, USV
- Unit: 30th Reg. Wis. Vol. Infantry
- Battles/wars: American Civil War

Cornelius A. Davenport (July 3, 1843 – 1920) was an American farmer, Republican politician, and Wisconsin pioneer. He represented Waushara County in the Wisconsin State Assembly during the 1891 and 1893 sessions. He previously served as sheriff of Waushara County and served in the Union Army during the American Civil War.

== Biography ==
Davenport was born on July 3, 1843, in Antwerp, New York. He moved to Nepeuskun, Wisconsin in 1855 before later moving to the town of Aurora, Waushara County, Wisconsin. During the American Civil War, Davenport served with the 30th Wisconsin Infantry Regiment of the Union Army. He died in 1920.

== Political career ==
Davenport was elected to the Assembly in 1890 and 1892. Other positions he held include Sheriff of Waushara County in 1885 and 1886. He was a Republican.

Wisconsin State Assembly
Preceded by William B. La Selle	Member of the Wisconsin State Assembly from the Waushara County district January 5, 1891 – January 7, 1895	Succeeded by James T. Ellarson
