= William B. La Selle =

American politician (1845–1924)

William Bingham La Selle (October 1845 – July 30, 1924) was a member of the Wisconsin State Assembly.

== Biography ==
La Selle was born in October 1845 in Swanton (town), Vermont. Sources have differed on the exact date. During the American Civil War, he served with the 30th Wisconsin Volunteer Infantry Regiment of the Union Army. In 1871, La Selle married Lanah B. Chafee. They had three children.

== Political career ==
La Selle was elected to the Assembly in 1886 and 1888. Other positions he held include Town Clerk of Plainfield (town), Wisconsin from 1877 to 1881. He was a Republican.
