= Robert Graham (Wisconsin politician) =

American educator and politician (1827–1892)

12th Superintendent of Public Instruction of Wisconsin
- In office January 2, 1882 – January 3, 1887
- Governor: Jeremiah McLain Rusk
- Preceded by: William Clarke Whitford
- Succeeded by: Jesse B. Thayer

Personal details
- Born: July 24, 1827 Putnam, New York, U.S.
- Died: December 14, 1892 (aged 65) Oshkosh, Wisconsin, U.S.
- Resting place: Woodlands Cemetery, Cambridge, New York
- Party: Republican
- Spouse: Mary M. Maxwell (m. 1847; died 1901)
- Children: William Graham
- Education: Albany Normal School

Military service
- Allegiance: United States
- Branch/service: United States Volunteers; Union Army
- Years of service: 1864
- Rank: Captain, USV
- Unit: 39th Reg. Wis. Vol. Infantry
- Battles/wars: American Civil War: Second Battle of Memphis

Robert Graham (July 24, 1827 – December 14, 1892) was an American educator who served as the 12th Superintendent of Public Instruction of Wisconsin.

== Early career ==
Graham was born in Putnam, New York, on July 24, 1827. He left office in 1887 and returned to teaching. His father died when he was a child and he was raised by his childless uncle and aunt. He received an academy education and began teaching school to pay for the cost of attending the State Normal School in Albany, New York (now the University at Albany, SUNY. He studied under David Perkins Page until his death in 1848. Graham continued teaching in New York and became Superintendent of Schools in Washington County, New York. In 1861, however, he was convinced by his wife, Mary's, family to move west and take up a homestead. They settled at Kenosha, Wisconsin, and Graham quickly became a respected teacher in the area, rising to Superintendent of Schools in Kenosha County, Wisconsin.

== Civil War ==
In 1864, near the climax of the American Civil War, Graham responded to President Lincoln's call for Hundred Days Men to surge personnel into the Union Army ranks in an effort to end the war in 100 days. He enlisted and became Captain of Company C of the 39th Wisconsin Infantry Regiment. His regiment was assigned to the defense of Memphis, Tennessee, allowing veteran regiments already stationed there to join the Atlanta campaign. They lost over 30 men to disease, but only saw combat on August 21, 1864, when a detachment of cavalry under Nathan Bedford Forrest attempted a raid into Memphis in an unsuccessful attempt to capture the Union commanders stationed there. He mustered out a month later at the end of his hundred days service.

== Wisconsin schools ==
Graham returned to teaching in Kenosha, but soon was called to higher office. He was appointed to the University of Wisconsin Board of Regents in 1868, where he played a consequential role in shaping state schools. Graham's next project came in 1871, when a new Normal School was established at Oshkosh (now the University of Wisconsin–Oshkosh). The school's president, George S. Albee, called on Graham and Graham would go on to serve as Professor at the Normal School for the next ten years. He was a candidate for State Superintendent of Public Instruction in 1873 and 1875, but was not elected. In 1881, however, he was nominated by consensus of the Republican, Democratic, and Prohibition parties, winning an overwhelming majority. He was re-elected in 1884, running on the Republican ticket. He left office in 1887 and returned to teaching.

He died on December 14, 1892, at Oshkosh. After a funeral, his body was sent to New York to be interred at his family's burial plot.

== Personal life and family ==
Graham married Mary M. Maxwell of New York around 1847. They had only one son, William, living at the time of Graham's death.

== Electoral history ==
=== Wisconsin Superintendent (1873, 1875) ===
Wisconsin Superintendent of Public Instruction Election, 1873
Party	Candidate	Votes	%	±%
General Election, November 4, 1873
Liberal Republican	Edward Searing	80,147	54.42%	
Republican	Robert Graham	67,137	45.58%	−7.78%
Plurality		13,010	8.83%	+2.11%
Total votes		147,284	100.0%	+0.11%
Liberal Republican gain from Republican				

Wisconsin Superintendent of Public Instruction Election, 1875
Party	Candidate	Votes	%	±%
General Election, November 2, 1875
Liberal Republican	Edward Searing (incumbent)	85,392	50.35%	
Republican	Robert Graham	84,217	49.65%	+4.07%
Plurality		1,175	0.69%	-8.14%
Total votes		169,609	100.0%	+15.16%
Liberal Republican hold				

=== Wisconsin Superintendent (1881, 1884) ===
Wisconsin Superintendent of Public Instruction Election, 1881
Party	Candidate	Votes	%	±%
General Election, November 8, 1881
Republican	Robert Graham	164,115	95.81%	+44.46%
Greenback	John A. Gaynor	7,175	4.19%	−2.35%
Plurality		156,940	91.62%	+82.39%
Total votes		171,290	100.0%	-6.19%
Republican hold				

Wisconsin Superintendent of Public Instruction Election, 1884
Party	Candidate	Votes	%	±%
General Election, November 4, 1884
Republican	Robert Graham (incumbent)	170,406	53.52%	−42.29%
Democratic	Isaac N. Stewart	122,675	38.53%	
Democratic	Warren G. Parker	20,985	6.59%	
Greenback	H. S. Brown	4,322	1.36%	−2.83%
Plurality		47,731	14.99%	-76.63%
Total votes		318,388	100.0%	+85.88%
Republican hold				
