= Jesse B. Thayer =

19th century American politician

13th Superintendent of Public Instruction of Wisconsin
- In office January 3, 1887 – January 5, 1891
- Governor: Jeremiah McLain Rusk; William D. Hoard
- Preceded by: Robert Graham
- Succeeded by: Oliver Elwin Wells

3rd Mayor of River Falls, Wisconsin
- In office April 1886 – April 1887
- Preceded by: John Day Putnam
- Succeeded by: Edward Ballard

Member of the Wisconsin State Assembly from the Pierce County district
- In office January 5, 1885 – January 3, 1887
- Preceded by: John Day Putnam
- Succeeded by: John A. Murphy

Personal details
- Born: October 1, 1845 Janesville, Wisconsin, U.S.
- Died: September 7, 1910 (aged 64) Yountville, California, U.S.
- Resting place: Veterans Memorial Grove Cemetery, Yountville
- Party: Republican
- Spouse: Augusta Marie Leonard (m. 1871–1910)
- Children: Alice May Thayer^{(b. 1872; died 1876)}; Stella Ada (Pomeroy)^{(b. 1875; died 1934)}

Military service
- Allegiance: United States
- Branch/service: United States Volunteers; Union Army
- Years of service: 1864–1865
- Rank: Sergeant, USV
- Unit: 40th Reg. Wis. Vol. Infantry; 49th Reg. Wis. Vol. Infantry
- Battles/wars: American Civil War

Jesse Burnham Thayer (October 1, 1845 – September 7, 1910) was an American educator and Republican politician from River Falls, Wisconsin. He was the 13th Wisconsin Superintendent of Public Instruction (1887–1891) and the 3rd mayor of River Falls (1886). He also served one term in the Wisconsin State Assembly, representing Pierce County during the 1885 term. As superintendent, he was a driving force behind the Bennett Law, a compulsory education and anti-child labor law, better known for its English language instruction requirement, which brought political catastrophe to Wisconsin Republicans in the 1890 and 1892 elections. In historical documents, his name was often abbreviated as J. B. Thayer.

== Early life and Civil War service ==
Jesse Thayer was born in the town of Janesville, Wisconsin, on October 1, 1845.

When he was old enough, he volunteered for service in the Union Army in the midst of the American Civil War during a call for 100-day enlistments. He was enrolled as a private in Company C of the 40th Wisconsin Infantry Regiment as it was being organized at Camp Randall, in Madison, Wisconsin, and mustered into federal service May 9, 1864. The 40th Wisconsin Infantry was referred to as the "Normal Regiment" because of the large contingent of students and teachers in the ranks. During its short service, the 40th Wisconsin was mostly assigned to the defense of Memphis, Tennessee, and was engaged in the defense of Memphis during the raid known as the Second Battle of Memphis, in August 1864. The 40th Wisconsin Infantry enlistments expired on September 16, 1864.

Shortly after returning from the war, Thayer re-enlisted and was enrolled in Company D of the 49th Wisconsin Infantry Regiment; he mustered back into federal service in February 1865. The 49th Wisconsin Infantry spent their entire service in southern Illinois and eastern Missouri, protecting supply caravans. Thayer mustered out with the rank of sergeant on November 1, 1865.

== Career ==
After the war, Thayer attended Milton College and graduated in 1870, delivering an address in Latin at his commencement. He went to work as principal the public schools in Menomonie, Wisconsin, until 1875, when he was hired as a professor at the Rivers Falls Normal School (now University of Wisconsin–River Falls). The next year, he became an officer in the state teacher's association. Over the next decade, Thayer traveled extensively around northwestern Wisconsin conducting teacher trainings and evaluations.

In the fall of 1884, Thayer was nominated by the Pierce County Republican convention to serve as their candidate for Wisconsin State Assembly in the Pierce County district. At the general election, Thayer defeated the Democratic incumbent, John Day Putnam.

Just over a year after entering the Assembly, in April 1886, Thayer was also elected mayor of River Falls, defeating J. D. Putnam again.

At the Republican state convention in September 1886, Thayer was unanimously nominated as their candidate for state Superintendent of Public Instruction. Thayer was elected at the 1886 general election and was re-elected two years later.

Wisconsin had passed a compulsory education law in 1879, but during his first term in office, Thayer repeatedly attempted to demonstrate the failings of the law. A report issued by his office in 1888 demonstrated that the share of children attending school had actually decreased in the decade since the compulsory education law, and estimated that about 50,000 Wisconsin children between ages 7 and 14 were not attending school at all. Thayer's agitation created a public demand for education reform, which the new governor, William D. Hoard, embraced when he took office in 1889. Within months, the legislature unanimously passed the so-called Bennett Law, named for the law's author, state representative Michael John Bennett. After the initial positive reception, the law became a political fiasco due to a provision which mandated English language instruction in classrooms. The law was seen by Wisconsin's large immigrant community as an attempt by Nativists to eliminate their cultural heritage, and resulted it a massive backlash against Republicans at the 1890 election.

For his part, Thayer did not run for a third term in 1890.

== Personal life and family ==
Jesse Thayer was the eldest son and the third of eight children born to Lindley Murray Thayer and his wife Elizabeth (née Burnham). Jesse's elder sister Elizabeth was also educated at Milton College, and worked all her life as a teacher and school administrator.

Jesse Thayer married Augusta Marie Leonard in 1871. They had two daughters, though one died in childhood.

In his later years, Thayer resided at the Veterans Home in Yountville, California. He died there on September 7, 1910, and was buried at the veterans home cemetery.

== Electoral history ==
=== Wisconsin Assembly (1884) ===
Wisconsin Assembly, Pierce County District Election, 1884
Party	Candidate	Votes	%	±%
General Election, November 4, 1884
Republican	Jesse B. Thayer	2,411	63.72%	
Democratic	John Day Putnam (incumbent)	1,373	36.28%	−14.29pp
Plurality		1,038	27.43%	+26.29pp
Total votes		3,784	100.0%	+39.37%
Republican gain from Democratic				

=== Wisconsin Superintendent (1886, 1888) ===
Wisconsin Superintendent of Public Instruction Election, 1886
Party	Candidate	Votes	%	±%
General Election, November 2, 1886
Republican	Jesse B. Thayer	132,329	46.55%	−6.97pp
Democratic	Edward McLoughlin	119,223	41.94%	+3.41pp
Prohibition	J. J. Blaisdell	17,124	6.02%	
Populist	J. K. McGregor	15,605	5.49%	
Plurality		13,106	4.61%	-10.38pp
Total votes		284,281	100.0%	-10.71%
Republican hold				

Wisconsin Superintendent of Public Instruction Election, 1888
Party	Candidate	Votes	%	±%
General Election, November 6, 1888
Republican	Jesse B. Thayer (incumbent)	176,778	49.86%	+3.31pp
Democratic	Amos Squire	154,570	43.60%	+1.66pp
Prohibition	J. H. Gould	14,489	4.09%	−1.94pp
Union Labor	James W. Stewart	8,690	2.45%	
	Scattering	15	0.00%	
Plurality		22,208	6.26%	+1.65pp
Total votes		354,542	100.0%	+24.72%
Republican hold				

Party political offices
Preceded by Robert Graham	Republican nominee for Superintendent of Public Instruction of Wisconsin; 1886, 1888	Succeeded by Lorenzo D. Harvey
Wisconsin State Assembly
Preceded by John Day Putnam	Member of the Wisconsin State Assembly from the Pierce County district January 5, 1885 – January 3, 1887	Succeeded by John A. Murphy
Political offices
Preceded by John Day Putnam	Mayor of River Falls, Wisconsin; April 1886 – April 1887	Succeeded by Edward Ballard
Preceded by Robert Graham	Superintendent of Public Instruction of Wisconsin; January 3, 1887 – January 5, 1891	Succeeded by Oliver Elwin Wells
