= Orlando P. Vaughan =

American politician

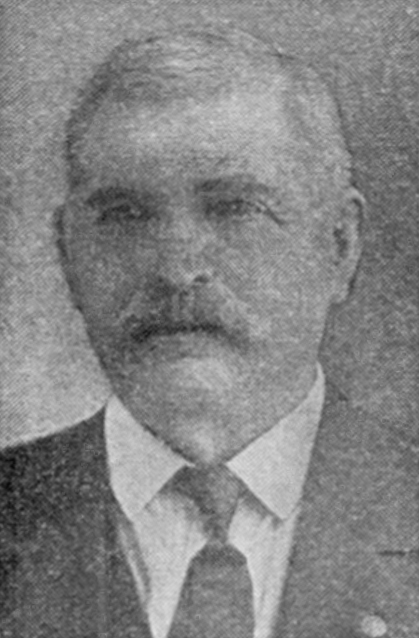

Member of the Wisconsin State Assembly
- In office 1917, 1919

Personal details
- Born: September 11, 1848 Kankakee, Illinois, US
- Died: February 20, 1925 (aged 76) Wauzeka, Wisconsin, US
- Party: Republican

Orlando P. Vaughan (September 11, 1848 – February 20, 1925) was a member of the Wisconsin State Assembly.

== Biography ==
Vaughan was born on September 11, 1848, in Kankakee, Illinois. He moved with his parents to Black Earth, Wisconsin in 1854. During the American Civil War, he served with the 49th Wisconsin Volunteer Infantry Regiment of the Union Army. Vaughan died at his home in Wauzeka, Wisconsin on February 20, 1925 and is buried in Wauzeka Cemetery.

== Political career ==
Vaughan was elected to the Assembly in 1916 and re-elected in 1918. Additionally, he was a member and Chairman of the Crawford County, Wisconsin Board. He was a Republican.
