= Abraham D. Andrews =

American physician and politician

Abraham D. Andrews (September 21, 1830 – July 23, 1885) was an American medical doctor and politician.

Born in Lovell, Oxford County, Maine, Andrews came to Wisconsin in 1856 and eventually settled in River Falls, Wisconsin where he practiced medicine. In 1860, Andrews received his medical degree from Chicago Medical College and was a surgeon and physician. Andrews also had lumber and farming interests. During the American Civil War, Andrews served in the 6th Wisconsin Volunteer Infantry Regiment. In 1869 and 1870, Andrew served on the Pierce County, Wisconsin Board of Supervisors and was a Republican. Andrews then served in the Wisconsin State Senate in 1878 and 1879. From 1870 until his death in 1885, Andrews served on the Wisconsin Board of Regents for Normal Schools. Andrews died of cerebro-meningitis at his home in River Falls, Wisconsin.
