= Dennis Reed (Wisconsin politician) =

American politician

Dennis A. Reed was a member of the Wisconsin State Assembly.

== Biography ==
Reed was born on March 4, 1822, in Norwalk, Ohio. He later resided in Ottawa County, Michigan, and Sturgeon Bay in Door County, Wisconsin. During the American Civil War, he became a first lieutenant with the 49th Wisconsin Volunteer Infantry Regiment of the Union Army.

== Political career ==
Reed was Ottawa County judge from 1850 to 1852. He was a member of the assembly during the 1865 Session. Previously, he was postmaster of the assembly in 1857 and assistant sergeant-at-arms of the assembly in 1858. Additionally, Reed was district attorney of Door County, Wisconsin. He was an independent politician.
