= David K. Noyes =

Union Army officer and politician

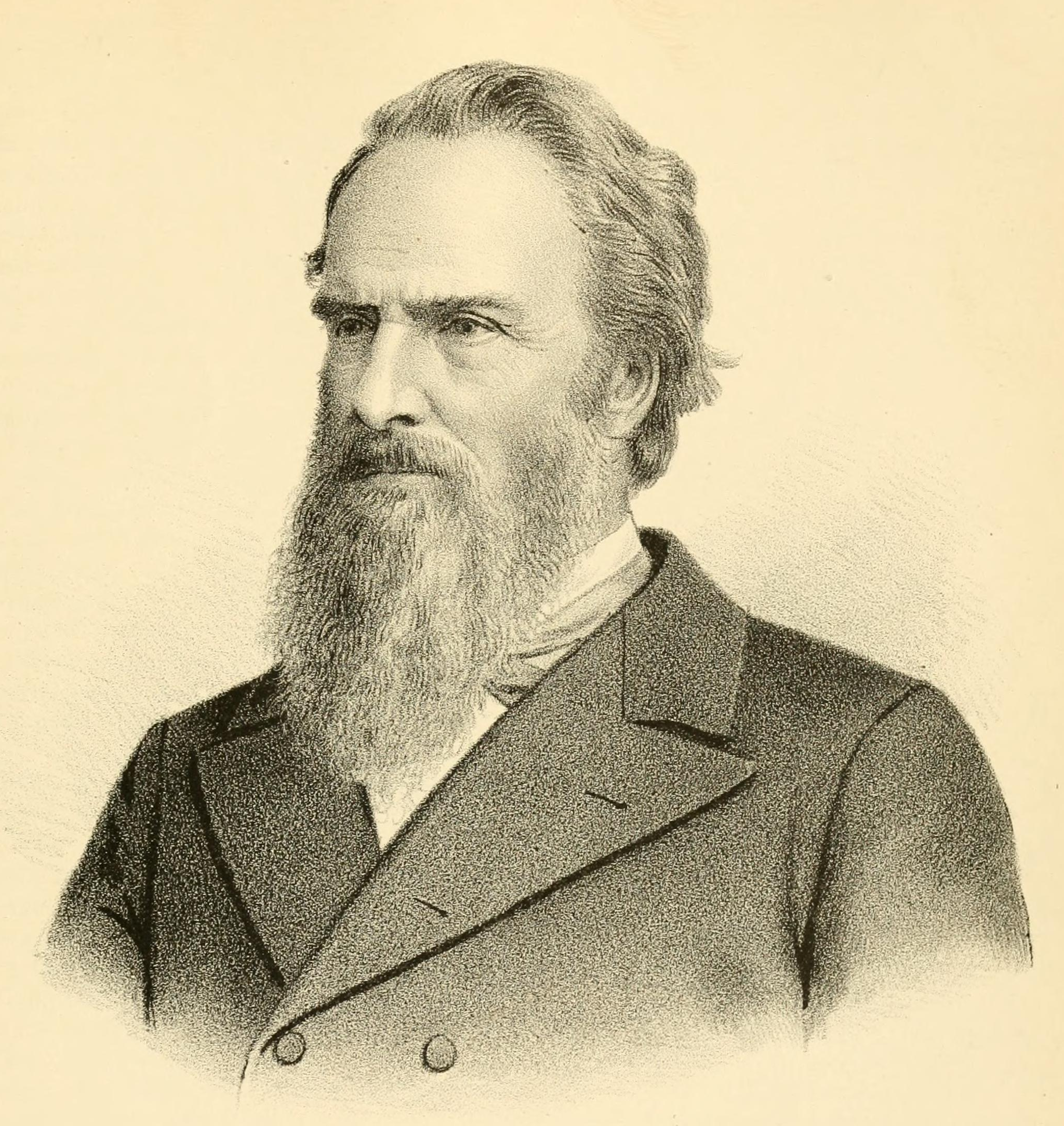
- portrait from The History of Sauk County, Wisconsin (1880)

Member of the Wisconsin State Assembly from the Adams–Sauk district
- In office January 7, 1856 – January 5, 1857
- Preceded by: Richard H. Davis
- Succeeded by: Joseph Langworthy

Personal details
- Born: David Knox Noyes; October 28, 1820 Tunbridge, Vermont, U.S.
- Died: November 24, 1900 (aged 80) Baraboo, Wisconsin, U.S.
- Resting place: Walnut Hills Cemetery; Baraboo, Wisconsin
- Party: Republican
- Spouse: Lucinda Barnes (m. 1848–1900)
- Children: Clara Lucinda (Huntington); Walter Knox; Arthur H. Rolla E.
- Parents: Enoch Noyes (father); Mary Ann (Knox) Noyes (mother)
- Education: Norwich University

Military service
- Allegiance: United States
- Branch/service: United States Volunteers; Union Army
- Years of service: 1861–1865
- Rank: Lt. Colonel, USV
- Unit: 6th Reg. Wis. Vol. Infantry; 49th Reg. Wis. Vol. Infantry
- Battles/wars: American Civil War: Northern Virginia Campaign; First Battle of Rappahannock Station; Second Battle of Bull Run; Maryland Campaign; Battle of South Mountain; Battle of Antietam

David Knox Noyes (October 28, 1820 – November 24, 1900) was an American lawyer, Republican politician, and Wisconsin pioneer. He represented Adams and Sauk counties in the Wisconsin State Assembly during the 1856 session. In the American Civil War, he served as an officer in the famed Iron Brigade of the Army of the Potomac and lost a foot at the Battle of Antietam.

== Early life and career ==
David K. Noyes was born in Tunbridge, Orange County, Vermont, to Enoch and Mary Ann Noyes. He entered Norwich University in 1842.

In 1844, he moved to Iowa County, in the Wisconsin Territory, and mined for lead, becoming associated with future Union Army brigadier general Amasa Cobb. At the outbreak of the Mexican–American War he and Cobb enlisted in a company of volunteers, but they were not needed for the war effort and were never mustered into service.

In 1846 he began studying law under David Noggle. He was admitted to the bar in 1847, and became the first practicing lawyer in Baraboo, Wisconsin.

In 1855, he established the Baraboo Republic, the first newspaper printed in Baraboo. That same year he was elected to the Wisconsin Assembly for the 1856 session. And later that year he was a delegate to the Republican National Convention.

== American Civil War ==
At the start of the American Civil War, Noyes volunteered for duty and was commissioned 1st lieutenant for Company A of the newly established 6th Wisconsin Infantry Regiment. The Regiment was mustered into service in July, 1861, and they marched for Washington. Upon their arrival, they were organized with three other regiments from Wisconsin and Indiana under General Rufus King into what would later be known as the Iron Brigade. The brigade was attached to the Army of the Potomac and saw significant fighting in the Northern Virginia and Maryland campaigns.

Noyes was promoted to captain of the company, but in the fall of 1862, was severely wounded at the Battle of Antietam when a shell exploded nearby. His right foot was badly damaged and had to be amputated.

Noyes returned to Wisconsin and served as chief recruiting officer for the state from January 1863 through July 1864, when he was discharged from service.

In February, 1865, however, Noyes returned to the Army as Major of the newly organized 49th Wisconsin Infantry Regiment. They were ordered to western Missouri in March, and Major Noyes had command of the regiment until the arrival of their Lieutenant Colonel in mid-April. He was then assigned to court martial and commission duty in Saint Louis until September. He was honorably discharged with the rank of Lieutenant Colonel in November 1865.

== Postbellum years ==
In 1866, Noyes started another newspaper, The Independent. He was then postmaster for Baraboo from 1867 through 1883, when he retired from active work. He was a member of the Independent Order of Odd Fellows, the Grand Army of the Republic, and the Military Order of the Loyal Legion of the United States.

== Family and personal life ==
On June 18, 1848, Noyes married Lucinda Barnes of Chelsea, Vermont. They had one daughter and three sons. Noyes died at age 80 at his home in Baraboo, November 24, 1900.
