= Albert Day Putnam =

American politician (1852–1905)

Member of the Connecticut House of Representatives from the Killingly district
- In office January 1, 1903 – January 1, 1905 Serving with William E. La Belle
- Preceded by: Charles H. Burroughs & William E. Atwood
- Succeeded by: A. H. Armington & Frank P. Warren

Personal details
- Born: February 25, 1852 Brooklyn, Connecticut, U.S.
- Died: December 25, 1905 (aged 53) Danielson, Connecticut, U.S.
- Resting place: Old Trinity Church Cemetery, Brooklyn, Connecticut
- Party: Republican
- Spouse: Harriet Eliza Dorrance (m. 1876–1905)
- Children: William Hutchinson Putnam^{(b. 1878; died 1958)}; Bertha Dorance Putnam^{(b. 1879; died 1881)}; Sarah Jennett Putnam^{(b. 1882; died 1918)}; Eliza Day Putnam^{(b. 1886; died 1949)}
- Parents: William H. Putnam (father); Eliza (Day) Putnam (mother)
- Relatives: John Day Putnam (brother); Israel Putnam (great-great-grandfather)
- Occupation: Businessman, banker

Albert Day Putnam (February 25, 1852 – December 25, 1905) was an American businessman and Republican politician from Windham County, Connecticut. He represented the town of Killingly in the Connecticut House of Representatives during the 1903 term.

== Biography ==
Albert Day Putnam was born in Brooklyn, Connecticut, in February 1852.

He was elected to the Connecticut House of Representatives in 1902, running on the Republican Party ticket and served in the 1903 Connecticut General Assembly.

Prior to entering politics, Putnam was a director of the Windham County National Bank of Danielson and a trustee of the Windham County Savings Bank.

Albert D. Putnam died at his home in Danielson, Connecticut, on December 25, 1905.

== Personal life and family ==
Albert Day Putnam was the youngest son of seven children born to Dr. William Hutchinson Putnam and his wife Eliza (née Day). William H. Putnam was a prominent farmer and physician in Brooklyn, Connecticut, and served in the state legislature. He was a direct descendant (great-grandson) of American Revolutionary War general Israel Putnam. They were members of the Putnam family, descendants of the Putnams who settled at Salem village, Massachusetts Bay Colony.

Albert's elder brothers John Day Putnam and William Putnam both served in Union Army in the American Civil War. John Day Putnam later served in the Wisconsin State Assembly and was mayor of River Falls, Wisconsin. William died at the Battle of Cedar Creek in 1864.

Albert Day Putnam married Harriet Eliza Dorrance in 1876. They had four children, though one daughter died in childhood.

Connecticut House of Representatives
Preceded by Charles H. Burroughs & William E. Atwood	Member of the Connecticut House of Representatives from the Killingly district January 1, 1903 – January 1, 1905; Served alongside: William E. La Belle	Succeeded by A. H. Armington & Frank P. Warren
