= Franciscan Servants of Jesus =

The Franciscan Servants of Jesus was a Catholic, Franciscan religious community for women. The congregation was founded in 1997 with the approval of Raymond Burke while he was the Bishop of La Crosse. The motherhouse was located in Prescott, Wisconsin.

Controversy arose concerning the foundress of the congregation, Julie Green, due to her being a transgender woman. Burke claimed that the matter had been approved by the Holy See.

The congregation was suppressed by Burke in 2003, before his departure to head the Archdiocese of St. Louis, and is no longer in existence.
