= Calvin Randall Morse =

American politician (1847–1911)

C. R. Morse

Member of the Wisconsin State Assembly from the Pierce County district
- In office January 2, 1899 – January 7, 1901
- Preceded by: George E. Pratt
- Succeeded by: Harry J. Park

Personal details
- Born: August 11, 1847 Bethel, Vermont, U.S.
- Died: February 18, 1911 (aged 63)
- Resting place: Greenwood Cemetery, River Falls, Wisconsin
- Party: Republican
- Spouse: Mary Belle Horton (m. 1879; died 1886)
- Children: Raymond Horton Morse^{(b. 1880; died 1881)}; Marvin A. Morse^{(b. 1882; died 1900)}; Stanley Randall Morse^{(b. 1886; died 1960)}
- Occupation: Newspaper publisher

Calvin Randall Morse (August 11, 1847 – February 18, 1911) was an American newspaper publisher and Republican politician, and Wisconsin pioneer. He was a member of the Wisconsin State Assembly, representing Pierce County during the 1899 term. His name was often abbreviated as C. R. Morse, and he was sometimes referred to by his middle name "Randall".

== Biography ==
Calvin Morse was born in Bethel, Vermont, in August 1847. He received his early education in Vermont, but came west with his parents in 1856, settling in River Falls, Wisconsin. As a young man, he partnered with his father in the newspaper business under the firm name A. Morse & Son. When his father was unable to continue working, he sold his share of the company to J. D. Moody, and the firm became known as C. R. Morse and Company. Moody then sold out to J. H. Wilkinson, and the firm became Morse & Wilkinson, their principal publication was the River Falls Journal daily newspaper.

In 1882, Morse made his first run for Wisconsin State Assembly, running as the Republican Party nominee in the Pierce County district. He lost a very close election, falling just 31 votes short of John Day Putnam.

Morse subsequently served several local offices, including alderman, member of the school board, and county supervisor. He also was a frequent attendee of local and regional Republican conventions and caucuses. In 1898, he made another run for Wisconsin State Assembly, receiving the Republican nomination in October of that year. At the general election, Morse defeated his Democratic opponent Ferris White, taking 70% of the vote. Morse declined to run for another term in 1900 after the death of his son earlier that year.

== Personal life and family ==
Calvin Morse was the elder of two children born to Abner Morse and his second wife, Mary (née Randall). Abner Morse was editor of the Green Mountain Herald in Vermont before moving to Wisconsin and entering the newspaper industry there.

Calvin Morse married Mary Belle Horton in 1879. They were married for only seven years before her death in 1886 from pregnancy complications. They had three sons, but one died in infancy and another died at age 18, in 1900. Their youngest son and only survivor, Stanley Randall Morse, served as a non-commissioned officer in the 341st U.S. Infantry Regiment in World War I. He died in 1960 leaving no survivors.

== Electoral history ==
=== Wisconsin Assembly (1882) ===
Wisconsin Assembly, Pierce County District Election, 1882
Party	Candidate	Votes	%	±%
General Election, November 7, 1882
Democratic	John D. Putnam	1,373	50.57%	
Republican	C. R. Morse	1,342	49.43%	−3.21pp
Plurality		31	1.14%	-4.13pp
Total votes		2,715	100.0%	+50.58%
Democratic gain from Republican				

=== Wisconsin Assembly (1898) ===
Wisconsin Assembly, Pierce County District Election, 1898
Party	Candidate	Votes	%	±%
General Election, November 8, 1898
Republican	C. R. Morse	1,725	69.61%	−0.63pp
Democratic	Ferris M. White	568	22.92%	−3.49pp
Prohibition	Cassius D. Hawn	93	3.75%	+0.40pp
Populist	David H. Baker	92	3.71%	
Plurality		1,157	46.69%	+2.86pp
Total votes		2,478	100.0%	-53.12%
Republican hold				

Wisconsin State Assembly
Preceded by George E. Pratt	Member of the Wisconsin State Assembly from the Pierce County district January 2, 1899 – January 7, 1901	Succeeded by Harry J. Park
