= Daniel J. Dill =

American politician

Daniel J. Dill (February 24, 1830 – February 7, 1917) was a military officer and politician.

== Biography ==
Dill was born on February 24, 1830, in Dillsburg, Pennsylvania. He moved to Prescott, Wisconsin, in 1859. On March 17, 1867, he married Mary P. Johnson. They had three children. Dill died on February 7, 1917, in Prescott, where he was also buried.

== Military career ==
After having previously served in the Mexican–American War, Dill joined what was later the 6th Wisconsin Volunteer Infantry Regiment of the Union Army following the start of the American Civil War. He became Colonel of the 30th Wisconsin Volunteer Infantry Regiment. Later, he commanded the Union military post at Louisville, Kentucky, and was Provost Marshal of the Department of Kentucky of the Military Division of the Mississippi.

== Political career ==
Dill served two terms in the Wisconsin State Assembly and was a Republican. Other positions he held include Chairman of the Pierce County, Wisconsin Board of Supervisors. Dill also served as mayor of Prescott from 1867 to 1869. 1876 to 1877, and 1883 to 1885.
