= 49th Wisconsin Infantry Regiment =

Union Army infantry regiment

- Flag of Wisconsin
- Active: December 24, 1864 – November 8, 1865
- Country: United States
- Allegiance: Union
- Branch: Infantry
- Size: Regiment
- Engagements: American Civil War

Commanders
- Colonel: Samuel Fallows
- Colonel: Edward Colman

The 49th Wisconsin Infantry Regiment was a volunteer infantry regiment that served in the Union Army during the American Civil War.

== Service ==
The 49th Wisconsin was organized at Camp Randall in Madison, Wisconsin, and mustered into federal service between February 8, 1865, and March 6, 1865. It left the state on March 8, 1865, and was assigned to duty in western Missouri. Companies B, C, and D were mustered out on November 1, 1865, and the remaining companies were mustered out on November 8, 1865.

== Casualties ==
The 49th Wisconsin suffered 54 enlisted men who died of disease, for a total of 54 fatalities.

== Commanders ==
- Colonel Samuel Fallows (January 28, 1865 – November 1, 1865) mustered out shortly before the rest of the regiment. He earlier served as chaplain of the 32nd Wisconsin Infantry Regiment and lieutenant colonel of the 40th Wisconsin Infantry Regiment. Received an honorary brevet to brigadier general after the war. Later he was Superintendent of Public Instruction of Wisconsin and Presiding Bishop of the Reformed Episcopal Church.
- Colonel Edward Colman (November 1, 1865 – November 8, 1865) mustered out with the regiment. He previously served with the 18th Wisconsin Infantry Regiment and was wounded at Shiloh and Champion Hill.

== Notable people ==
- Joseph Bartholomew, was 1st lieutenant in Co. I. Earlier in the war was enlisted in Co. H, 23rd Wisconsin Infantry Regiment. After the war he became the 2nd chief justice of the North Dakota Supreme Court.
- David Evans, Jr., was enlisted in Co. B. After the war he became a Wisconsin legislator.
- William Edwards Huntington, 1st lieutenant in Co. H. After the war was president of Boston University.
- David K. Noyes was major but spent much of the time assigned to a military commission. Earlier in the war he had served as an officer in the 6th Wisconsin Infantry Regiment and lost a foot at Antietam.
- Hugh Porter was a corporal in Co. F. After the war he became a Wisconsin legislator.
- Dennis A. Reed was quartermaster. After the war he became a Wisconsin legislator.
- Jesse B. Thayer was enlisted in Co. D and rose to the rank of sergeant. Earlier in the war he served in Co. C, 40th Wisconsin Infantry Regiment. After the war he became a Wisconsin legislator and the 13th Superintendent of Public Instruction of Wisconsin.
- Orlando P. Vaughan was enlisted in Co. H. After the war he became a Wisconsin legislator.

== See also ==
- List of Wisconsin Civil War units
- Wisconsin in the American Civil War
