= 30th Wisconsin Infantry Regiment =

Union Army infantry regiment

- Flag of Wisconsin
- Active: October 21, 1862 – September 20, 1865
- Country: United States
- Allegiance: Union
- Branch: Infantry
- Size: Regiment
- Engagements: American Civil War: Alfred Sully's Expedition Against the Sioux in Dakota Territory

Commanders
- Colonel: Daniel J. Dill

The 30th Wisconsin Infantry Regiment was a volunteer infantry regiment that served in the Union Army during the American Civil War.

== Service ==
The 30th Wisconsin Infantry was organized at Camp Randall, Madison, Wisconsin, and mustered into federal service October 21, 1862. Duty at Green Bay, West Bay and other points in Wisconsin, enforcing draft, etc., until March, 1863. Headquarters of regiment at Camp Randall until December 26, 1862, then at Camp Reno, Milwaukee, Wisconsin. Companies "D" "F," "I" and "K" ordered to St. Louis, Missouri, May 2, 1863. Guard boats and supplies for Sully's Northwestern Indian Expedition up the Missouri River till August. Companies "I" and "K" ordered to Milwaukee. Companies "D" and "F" at Fann Island, and fatigue duty building Fort Sully till December, 1863. Companies "E" and "G" at Bayfield and Superior City, Wisconsin, May 26–August 21, 1863, then report to Milwaukee. Company "G" ordered to Davenport, Iowa, December 5, 1863. Company "I" moved to St. Louis, Mo., April, 1864, and thence to Fort Union, Dakota Territory, and duty there until June, 1865. While at Fort Sully the 30th WIS helped rescue the James L. Fisk wagon train at Fort Dilts. Rejoined regiment at St. Louis, Missouri, June 22, 1865. Companies "A," "C," "F" and "H" left Milwaukee, Wisconsin, April 20, 1864, to join Sully's Northwestern Indian Expedition. Moved from St. Louis to Fort Sully, Dakota Territory, thence to Fort Rice, and duty there until October. Moved to Sioux City October 12–November 2. Company "D" join. Moved to Quincy, Illinois, thence to Louisville, Kentucky, November 24–29. Companies "B," "E," "G" and "K" left Milwaukee for Dakota Territory April, 1864. Duty at Fort Wadsworth July 1–September 29. Ordered to St. Louis, Missouri, thence to relief of Paducah, Kentucky, October 29. Moved to St. Louis December 6–10, and join balance of regiment. Moved to Bowling Green, Kentucky, December 12 and assigned to 2nd Brigade, 2nd Division, Military District of Kentucky. Moved to Louisville, Kentucky, January 10, 1865, and provost duty there until September; also conducting prisoners to various points. Companies "B," "E" and "G" moved to Frankfort, Kentucky, February, 1865, and duty there until June. Mustered out September 20, 1865.

== Detailed Service ==
The 30th Wisconsin Infantry was recruited under the call of July, 1862, for 300,000 men. The first man to enlist was James Berry of Company D, on July 21, 1862. Enlistments closed on August 23, 1862, with a full regiment of 1020 men. Many of the enlistment papers were made out for the Twenty-fifth Regiment, but volunteering was so brisk that thirteen full regiments were raised from the 21st to the 33rd Wisconsin, inclusive, within thirty days from the call.

The average age of the men was twenty-five years and six months; their average height was 5 ft. 7 7–10 inches. Many were lumbermen, farmers and miners, and a number were Indians from the Chippewa Reservation. Nearly 90% were born in the United States.

The regiment was mustered into the United States service, October 18, 1862, at Camp Randall, near Madison, Wisconsin. As mustered in, the regiment was composed as follows:

- Company A, Captain Samuel Harriman, from St. Croix, Polk and Pierce Counties
- Company B, Captain Lewis S. Burton, from Iowa and Lafayette Counties
- Company C, Captain A. A. Arnold, from Trempealeau County
- Company D, Captain David С. Fulton, from St. Croix, Polk and Pierce Counties
- Company E, Captain Edward Devlin, from Iowa and Lafayette Counties
- Company F, Captain Martin A. Driebelbis, from Pierce County
- Company G, Captain Asa B. Swain, from Waushara County
- Company H, Captain Andrew Bedal, from Waushara County
- Company I, Captain Napoleon B. Greer, from Eau Claire County
- Company K, Captain John Klatt, from Chippewa County

Subsequently, regimental headquarters remained at Camp Randall, while portions of the regiment were almost constantly detached in the performance of various kinds of duty.

On May 2, 1863, companies D, F, I and K, under command of Lieutenant Colonel Bartlett, were ordered to the upper Missouri River, to support the Indian expedition under General Alfred Sully. These companies served with this command at different points on the river, from Sioux City, Iowa, to Fort Pierre, Dakota Territory, until the August 10, 1863, when companies I and К were ordered to report at Camp Washburn, Milwaukee, Wisconsin, leaving companies D and F at Fort Pierre; these companies arrived at Milwaukee on September 12, 1863.

On the May 26, companies G and E left Camp Randall, the former for Superior, Wis., and the latter for Bayfield, Wisconsin, in anticipation of trouble with the Indians at these points. They remained at these stations, respectively, until the middle of August, when they were recalled; arrived on August 31 at Camp Washburn, which was placed under command of Major John Clowney, of this regiment. The remaining companies, at various times, were sent to various parts of the state to maintain order during the enrollment and draft, under the Conscription Act. Colonel Daniel J. Dill was Post Commandant at Camp Randall during this time.

In the December, 1863, the regiment was transferred to Camp Washburn, and subsequently to Camp Reno, at Milwaukee, Wisconsin, where the headquarters of the regiment were established. In March, 1864, detachments of the regiment were ordered to various points in Dakota Territory and Northwestern Minnesota, and in General Sully's campaign against the Sioux Indians, moving from point to point during the summer, performing many marches and participating in several engagements with Indians.

On October 1, 1864, detachments of the 30th Wisconsin were stationed at various places in Dakota Territory as follows: Companies A, C, F, and H, under the immediate command of Colonel Dill, at Fort Rice, of which post Lieutenant Colonel Bartlett was placed in command; Companies B, E, G and К under command of Major Clowney, at Fort Wadsworth (later renamed to Fort Sisseton) near Coteau des Prairies; Company D, under command of Captain Fulton, at Fort Sully, and Company I, under command of Captain Greer, at Fort Union. Orrin C. Hall, the First Sergeant of Company I, was killed in action during a skirmish with Sioux warriors near Fort Union on April 27, 1865.

Companies A, C, F and H, commanded by Colonel Dill, left Fort Rice, Dakota, Friday, October 12, 1864, and descending the Missouri river in flat boats built by themselves, arrived November 2, 1864, at Sioux City, Iowa, where they were joined by Company D, under command of Lieutenant Lewis O. Marshall, Captain David С. Fulton having been promoted Major of the 1st Wisconsin Heavy Artillery Battalion on October 14. Continuing their journey down the river they arrived at St. Joseph, Missouri, November 17, 1864. Company H having been detained by floating ice, Captain Bedal abandoned his boat a few miles above St. Joseph, and marched his command to the city, rejoining the other companies November 23. Leaving St. Joseph on November 24, and proceeding by rail, they arrived on the following day at Quincy, Illinois, and thence proceeded by way of Springfield, Illinois, and Indianapolis, Indiana, arriving on November 29, 1864, at Louisville, Kentucky, where they went into camp.

Companies B, E, G and K, under command of Major Clowney, left Fort Wadsworth, Dakota Territory, on the September 29, 1864, en route for Fort Snelling, Minn., where they arrived on the October 20, having marched upwards of four hundred miles in twenty days, making an average of 20½ miles per day. Embarking on steamboats at Fort Snelling, Minnesota, on October 20, they descended the Mississippi to St. Louis, Missouri, where they arrived on October 26, and were quartered in Benton Barracks. They left St. Louis on the October 29, and arrived the next day at Paducah, Kentucky, at the mouth of the Tennessee River. Here they were employed in guard duty until December 6, 1864, when they again embarked and proceeding up the Ohio River, landed at Louisville December 10, where they rejoined the balance of the regiment, with the exception of Co. I, which still remained at Fort Union, Dakota Territory.

On the December 12, 1864, the nine companies of the Thirtieth left Louisville by rail, and next day went into camp at Bowling Green, Kentucky. Here the regiment was assigned to the Second Brigade, Second Division, Military District of Kentucky. Colonel Dill took command of the Brigade, and Major Clowney that of the Regiment. On the 10th of January 10, 1865, the Regiment left Bowling green for Louisville, arriving on the 12th, where they were assigned to duty as guard to the military prison in that city. On January 20, 1865, Companies A, D and F, under command of Captain Meacham, of Company F, were detached as provost guard in Louisville. On the February 8, 1865, Companies B, E and G, under command of Major Clowney, proceeded by rail to Frankfort, Kentucky, sixty five miles from Louisville, under orders to assume the duties of permanent garrison of that city. Company B, on the March 30, moved from Frankfort to Georgetown, Kentucky, near which they were stationed as garrison, under command of Lieutenant William H. Gill.

Lieutenant Colonel Bartlett rejoined and assumed command of the Regiment at Louisville in the latter part of February, 1865, and on April 17, 1865, Colonel Dill was appointed Provost Marshal General of Kentucky. Company В rejoined the command May 27, and early in June Companies E and G returned to Louisville, where Company I also rejoined the regiment on June 22, 1865, having been relieved from duty at Fort Union, Dakota Territory on June 4 by Company B of the 1st United States Volunteer Infantry. During the service of the Regiment in Kentucky it was engaged in running down and capturing bands of guerrillas in the Department.

The regiment was mustered out of service at Louisville, Kentucky, on September 20, 1865, and immediately started for home, arriving at Madison, Wisconsin, on September 25, 1865, where it was paid and disbanded.

== Casualties ==
The 30th Wisconsin suffered 2 enlisted men killed in action or who later died of their wounds, plus another 2 officers and 65 enlisted men who died of disease, for a total of 69 fatalities.

== Commanders ==
- Colonel Daniel J. Dill (July 22, 1862 – September 20, 1865) nominally commanded the regiment for its entire service, but was detached as provost marshal of Kentucky near the end of the war. Before joining the 30th Wisconsin Infantry, he was captain of Co. B in the 6th Wisconsin Infantry Regiment. After the war he served in the Wisconsin State Assembly.
  - Major John Clowney (February 8, 1865 – September 20, 1865) had command of the regiment when Colonel Dill and Lt. Colonel Edward M. Barlett were assigned to provost and court martial duty.

== Notable members ==
- Arthur Lockard Cox, son of Charles B. Cox, was first lieutenant and later captain of Co. A.
- Cornelius A. Davenport was enlisted in Co. H for the last three years of the war. After the war he was a member of the Wisconsin State Assembly.
- Edward M. Bartlett, brother of M. D. Bartlett, was lieutenant colonel of the regiment through most of the regiment's service. Toward the end of the war he was detached and assigned to court martial duty at Louisville.

== See also ==
- List of Wisconsin Civil War units
- Wisconsin in the American Civil War
