= Prescott, Wisconsin =

- City
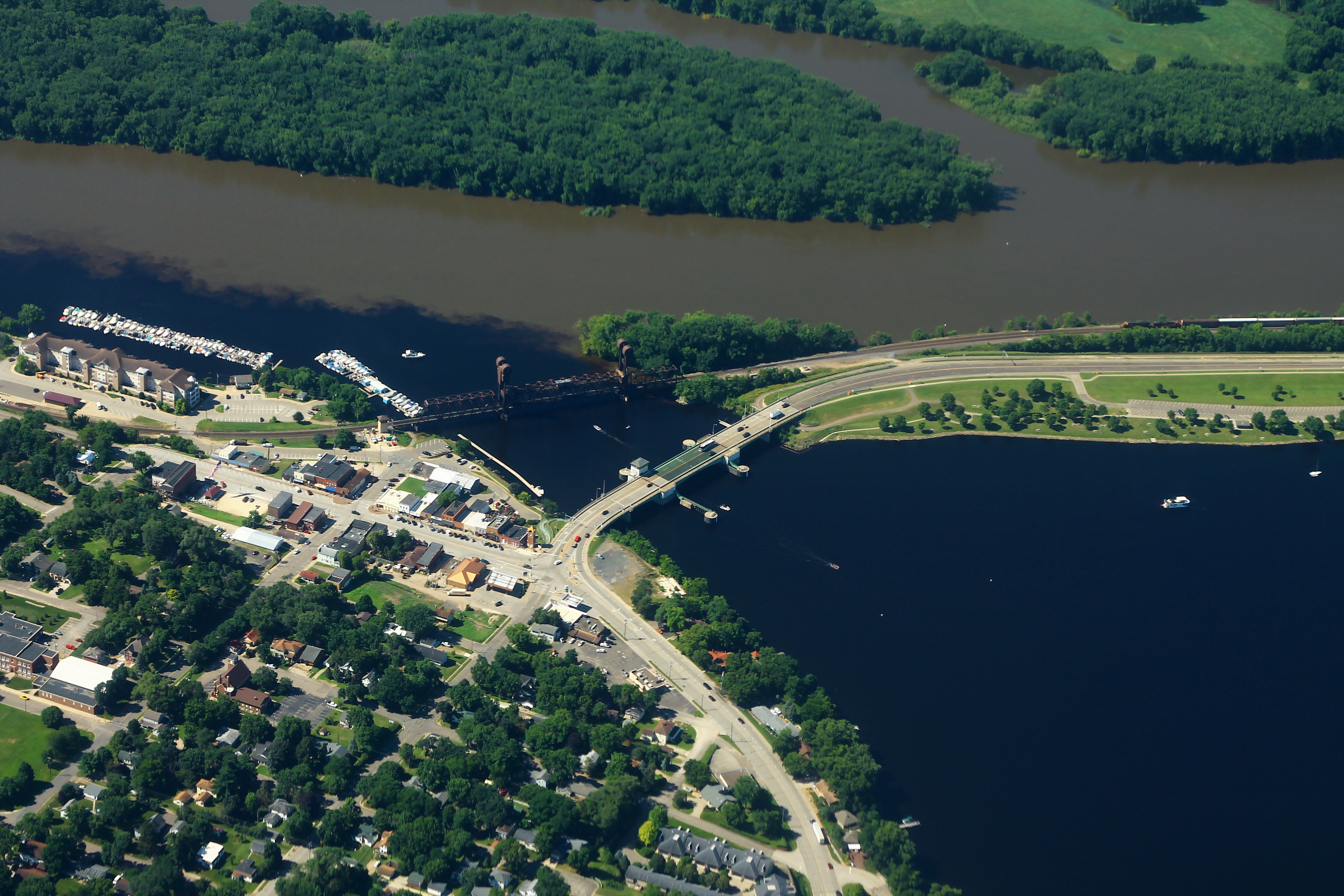
- Aerial view of downtown Prescott

- Location in Pierce County, Wisconsin

- Location within the state of Wisconsin Location within the United States
- Coordinates: 44°45′6″N 92°47′35″W
- Country: United States
- State: Wisconsin
- County: Pierce

Government
  - Type: Mayor - Council
  - Mayor: Robert Daugherty

Area
  - Total: 2.97 sq mi (7.70 km^{2})
  - Land: 2.60 sq mi (6.73 km^{2})
  - Water: 0.37 sq mi (0.97 km^{2})
- Elevation: 712 ft (217 m)

Population (2020)
  - Total: 4,333
  - Density: 1,670/sq mi (644/km^{2})
- Time zone: UTC-6 (Central (CST))
  - Summer (DST): UTC-5 (CDT)
- Area codes: 715 & 534
- FIPS code: 55-65375
- GNIS feature ID: 1571918
- Website: www.prescottwi.gov

Prescott is a city in Pierce County, Wisconsin, United States, at the confluence of the St. Croix River and Mississippi River. Prescott is at the edge of the Minneapolis–St. Paul metropolitan area. The population was 4,333 at the 2020 census, making it the county's second-largest city after River Falls and the largest entirely within Pierce County.

Prescott was home to the mother house of the Franciscan Servants of Jesus. The town was first settled by (and named for) Philander Prescott, who opened a trading post there in 1839.

== Geography ==
According to the United States Census Bureau, the city has an area of 2.96 square miles (7.67 km^{2}), of which 2.59 square miles (6.71 km^{2}) is land and 0.37 square miles (0.96 km^{2}) is water.

Prescott is Wisconsin's westernmost incorporated community, although rural portions of Burnett and Polk Counties are farther west. Along with the rest of Pierce County, Prescott is officially part of the Minneapolis-St. Paul-Bloomington MN-WI Metropolitan Statistical Area, with many Prescott residents commuting to Minneapolis or Saint Paul for employment or education.

Prescott is located at 44°45′6″N 92°47′35″W (44.751567, -92.793141).

== Transportation ==
Prescott is served by U.S. Highway 10 and Wisconsin Highways 29 and 35. U.S. 10 runs west to the Twin Cities and east to the county seat in Ellsworth. WIS 35 runs along Wisconsin's western border. From Prescott, it runs north toward River Falls and Hudson, though County Road F provides a more direct connection to Hudson. WIS 35 runs south along the Mississippi River through rural areas to La Crosse, and provides easy access to Red Wing, Minnesota via U.S. 63. WIS 29's western terminus is Prescott. It runs east to River Falls, Menomonie, Chippewa Falls, Wausau, and Green Bay before ending in Kewaunee.

Prescott has no scheduled public transportation services. The nearest public transportation is in Cottage Grove, Minnesota, where Metro Transit offers express buses to Minneapolis and St. Paul on weekdays at rush hour.

Due to its location along the confluence of two navigable rivers, Prescott is a major area for private boating, but no scheduled commercial transportation options are available by river.

Amtrak train service is available in both Red Wing and St. Paul, which are both served by the Empire Builder, running between Chicago and Seattle or Portland, Oregon.

The nearest intercity bus service is provided in Hastings, Minnesota, by Jefferson Lines, running between Minneapolis and Rochester.

Commercial air service is available at the Minneapolis-St. Paul International Airport.

== Education ==
Prescott has four public schools and one parochial school. The Prescott School District operates the four public schools: Malone Elementary School (grades K-2), Malone Intermediate School (3–5), Prescott Middle School (6–8), and Prescott High School (9–12). St. Joseph's School is a private Catholic school for grades K-6. The Prescott Public Schools' mascot is the cardinal.

== Demographics ==
Historical population
Census	Pop.	Note	%±
1860	1,031		—
1870	1,138		10.4%
1880	975		−14.3%
1890	911		−6.6%
1900	1,002		10.0%
1910	936		−6.6%
1920	892		−4.7%
1930	755		−15.4%
1940	857		13.5%
1950	1,005		17.3%
1960	1,536		52.8%
1970	2,331		51.8%
1980	2,654		13.9%
1990	3,243		22.2%
2000	3,764		16.1%
2010	4,258		13.1%
2020	4,333		1.8%
U.S. Decennial Census

=== 2010 census ===
As of the census of 2010, there were 4,258 people, 1,685 households, and 1,152 families living in the city. The population density was 1,644.0 inhabitants per square mile (634.8/km^{2}). There were 1,813 housing units at an average density of 700.0 per square mile (270.3/km^{2}). The racial makeup of the city was 95.8% White, 0.3% African American, 0.6% Native American, 0.4% Asian, 0.6% from other races, and 2.2% from two or more races. Hispanic or Latino of any race were 2.0% of the population.

There were 1,685 households, of which 35.9% had children under the age of 18 living with them, 53.4% were married couples living together, 10.1% had a female householder with no husband present, 4.9% had a male householder with no wife present, and 31.6% were non-families. 23.3% of all households were made up of individuals, and 7.5% had someone living alone who was 65 years of age or older. The average household size was 2.50 and the average family size was 2.97.

The median age in the city was 36.5 years. 25.9% of residents were under the age of 18; 6.6% were between the ages of 18 and 24; 29.7% were from 25 to 44; 26.7% were from 45 to 64; and 11.1% were 65 years of age or older. The gender makeup of the city was 50.4% male and 49.6% female.

=== 2000 census ===
As of the census of 2000, there were 3,764 people, 1,432 households, and 1,006 families living in the city. The population density was 1,860.4 inhabitants per square mile (718.3/km^{2}). There were 1,472 housing units at an average density of 727.5 per square mile (280.9/km^{2}). The racial makeup of the city was 98.17% White, 0.21% African American, 0.48% Native American, 0.24% Asian, 0.35% from other races, and 0.56% from two or more races. Hispanic or Latino of any race were 1.22% of the population.

There were 1,432 households, out of which 36.6% had children under the age of 18 living with them, 56.6% were married couples living together, 9.9% had a female householder with no husband present, and 29.7% were non-families. 22.2% of all households were made up of individuals, and 8.0% had someone living alone who was 65 years of age or older. The average household size was 2.59 and the average family size was 3.08.

In the city, the population was spread out, with 26.4% under the age of 18, 9.4% from 18 to 24, 32.8% from 25 to 44, 20.5% from 45 to 64, and 10.9% who were 65 years of age or older. The median age was 34 years. For every 100 females, there were 98.8 males. For every 100 females age 18 and over, there were 96.1 males.

The median income for a household in the city was $52,598, and the median income for a family was $60,237. Males had a median income of $37,950 versus $27,111 for females. The per capita income for the city was $22,610. About 1.6% of families and 4.6% of the population were below the poverty line, including 3.2% of those under age 18 and 9.5% of those age 65 or over.

== Notable people ==
- Alvin Baldus, former member of Congress
- Solanus Casey, Roman Catholic priest
- Daniel J. Dill, Wisconsin State Representative
- Nellie A. Hope, violinist, music teacher, orchestra conductor
- Edward H. Ives, Wisconsin State Senator
- Elmore Y. Sarles, Governor of North Dakota
- Nick Schommer, NFL football player
- Heidi Swank, member of the Nevada Assembly
- Austin H. Young, Wisconsin State Senator
