= Orrin T. Williams =

American politician

Orrin Thomas Williams (October 19, 1845 – May 6, 1928) was an American judge, lawyer, and politician.

Williams was born in Homer, New York. He moved to Whitewater, Wisconsin in 1855. He went to Lawrence University and to the University of Wisconsin Law School. He practiced law in Fond du Lac, Wisconsin. Williams then moved to Milwaukee, Wisconsin and continued to practice law in 1883. Williams served in the Wisconsin Assembly in 1891 and 1892 and was a Republican. He then served as a Wisconsin Circuit Court judge for Milwaukee until he retired in 1917. Williams died in Milwaukee, Wisconsin.
