= James Franklin Ware =

American politician

James Franklin Ware (1849–1934) was a member of the Wisconsin State Assembly and the Wisconsin State Senate.

== Biography ==
Ware was born on February 11, 1849, in Litchfield, Maine. He graduated from Lawrence University in 1871 and from the University of Michigan Law School in 1873.

== Career ==
Ware was a member of the Assembly in 1880, 1881 and 1883. In 1884, he was elected to the Senate from the 18th District. He was a Republican. Around 1887, he married Mary L. Lord, daughter of fellow State Senator Dr. Simon Lock Lord. Between 1893 and 1896 he moved to Galveston, Texas, where he was postmaster and later "president of a gold mining company". Ware moved to Waco, Texas, and later Fort Worth, Texas, where he died on February 4, 1934.
