= 6th Wisconsin Infantry Regiment =

Union Army infantry regiment

- Flag of Wisconsin
- Active: July 16, 1861 – July 2, 1865
- Country: United States
- Allegiance: Union
- Branch: Infantry
- Size: Regiment
- Nickname: "The Calico" or "Calico Boys"
- Engagements: American Civil War: Battle of Second Bull Run; Battle of South Mountain; Battle of Antietam; Battle of Chancellorsville; Battle of Gettysburg; Battle of the Wilderness; Battle of Spotsylvania Court House; Battle of Cold Harbor; Siege of Petersburg; Battle of Weldon Railroad; Battle of Five Forks

Commanders
- Colonel: Lysander Cutler
- Colonel: Edward S. Bragg
- Colonel: Rufus Dawes
- Colonel: John Azor Kellogg

Insignia
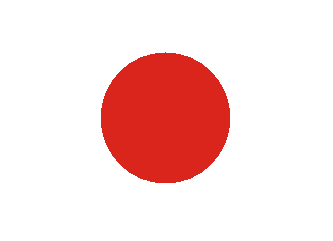
- I Corps badge (1st Division)

The 6th Wisconsin Infantry Regiment was a volunteer infantry regiment that served in the Union Army during the American Civil War. Throughout the war, it was part of the brigade that came to be known as the Iron Brigade in the Army of the Potomac. They were engaged in most of the critical battles of the eastern theater of the war, including Antietam, Gettysburg, and Grant's Overland Campaign.

== Service ==
The 6th Wisconsin was raised at Mauston, Wisconsin, and mustered into Federal service July 16, 1861, for a term of three years. After arriving in the vicinity of Washington, D.C., they were organized into a brigade with the 2nd Wisconsin, 7th Wisconsin, and 19th Indiana regiments, designated the 4th brigade, 1st division, III Corps, in the Army of Virginia.

They received their baptism by fire in the 1862 Northern Virginia Campaign, fighting at Brawner's Farm (Gainesville) in the waning hours of August 28, 1862, losing 72 men killed or wounded. It was during that battle, their brigade was given the nickname the "Iron Brigade".

After the devastating defeat at Second Bull Run, III Corps was transferred back into the Army of the Potomac and redesignated as I Corps. In the subsequent Maryland Campaign, the 6th Wisconsin would assault Turners Gap at the Battle of South Mountain, losing 90 men; three days later they would be heavily engaged again at the Battle of Antietam, resulting in another 152 casualties, including their then-commander, Colonel Edward Bragg, who was wounded in the first barrage.

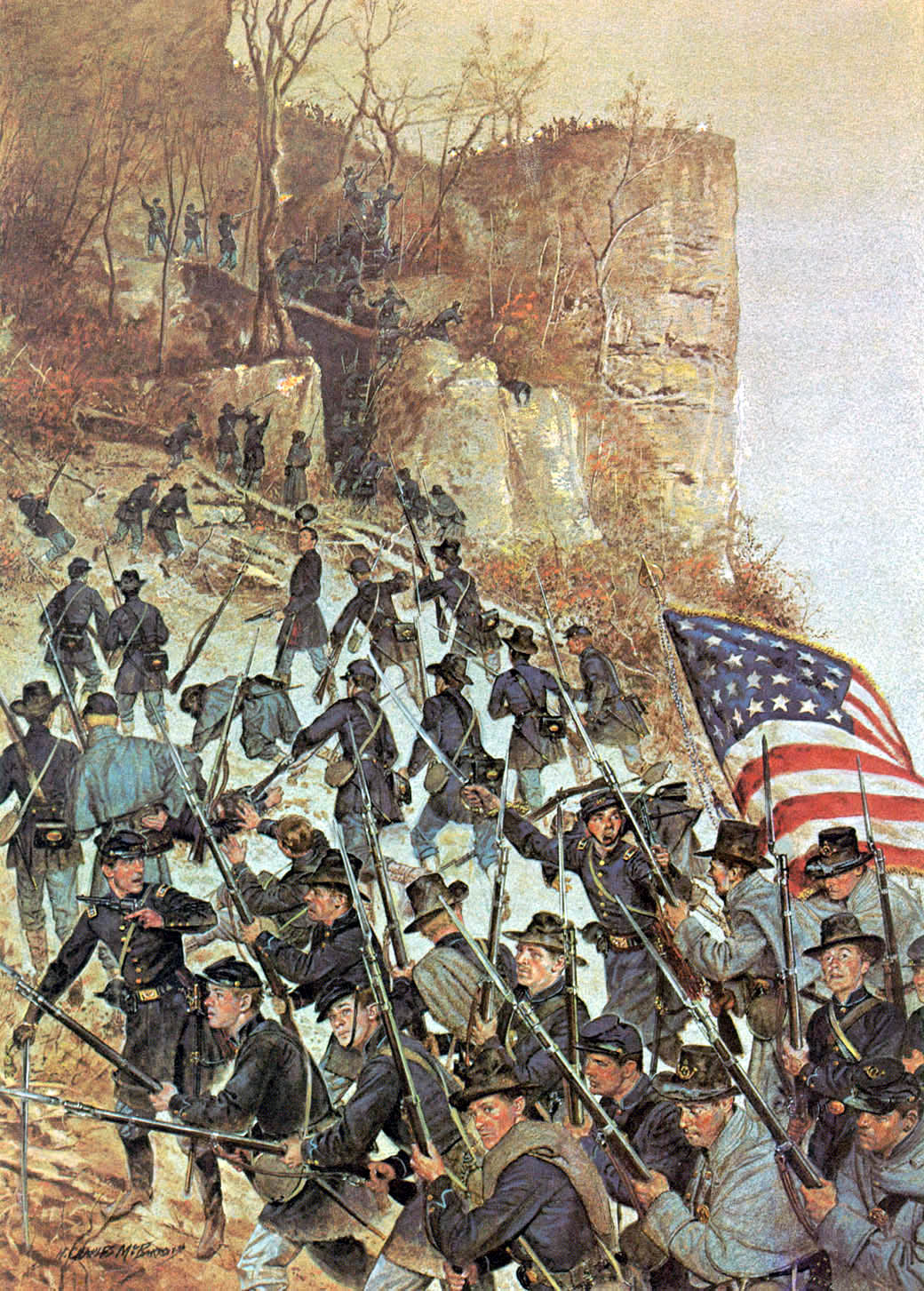
6th Wisconsin attacking at Turner's Gap, 1862.

The 6th Wisconsin would not see any major action at the Battle of Fredericksburg, but would partake in the assault at Fitzhugh's Crossing, April 29, 1863, part of the maneuvering for the Battle of Chancellorsville. Colonel Bragg would be wounded again at Chancellorsville, leaving command of the regiment to Lieutenant Colonel Rufus Dawes. After Chancellorsville, the Iron Brigade was redesignated as the 1st brigade, 1st division, I Corps.

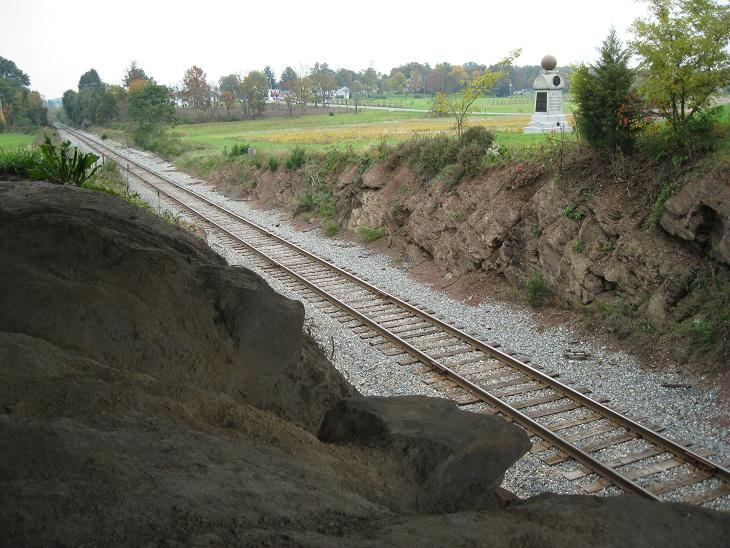
A SE View of the RR Cut at Gettysburg, where the 6th Wisconsin made their famed charge.

The 6th Wisconsin's next major engagement would be at the crossroads town of Gettysburg, July 1, 1863. Their brigade was one of the first to engage the enemy at Gettysburg, advancing to Herbst's Woods in the morning, but the 6th Wisconsin would initially be held in reserve on Seminary Ridge. After the collapse of Lysander Cutler's brigade, The 6th Wisconsin would be ordered to attack an exposed Confederate brigade under the command of Joseph R. Davis. The 6th would form up on the Chambersburg Pike behind a fence, and—aided by the 14th Brooklyn and the 95th New York— would assault the Confederates, who had entrenched themselves in an unfinished railroad cut. The following is quoted from Lieutenant Colonel Rufus Dawes in his postwar memoirs Service with the 6th Wisconsin. "I first mistook the strange maneuver for a retreat, but was undeceived by the deadly fire, which they at once began to pour from their cover in the cut." Dawes noted that he lost ten men carrying the colors, and nearly half of all available officers. Upon reaching the railroad cut the 6th Wisconsin engaged in melee with the Confederates, capturing numerous prisoners and the battle flag of the 2nd Mississippi. The regiment would hold their position in the railroad cut, until ordered to retreat with the rest of the 1st Corps. On July 2nd the Iron Brigade would entrench on Culps' Hill south of Gettysburg. The 6th Wisconsin would suffer a total of 168 casualties at Gettysburg.

After Gettysburg, the brigade would be briefly joined by the 167th Pennsylvania, who, convinced that their enlistments had expired, refused to march. As a result, the brigade was ordered to shoot the unruly Pennsylvanians, who quickly went into line, with little to no doubt in their mind that the hardened veterans of the Iron Brigade would not hesitate to shoot them, the 6th was ordered to march behind the 167th at bayonet point, with orders to shoot anyone who fell out of line.

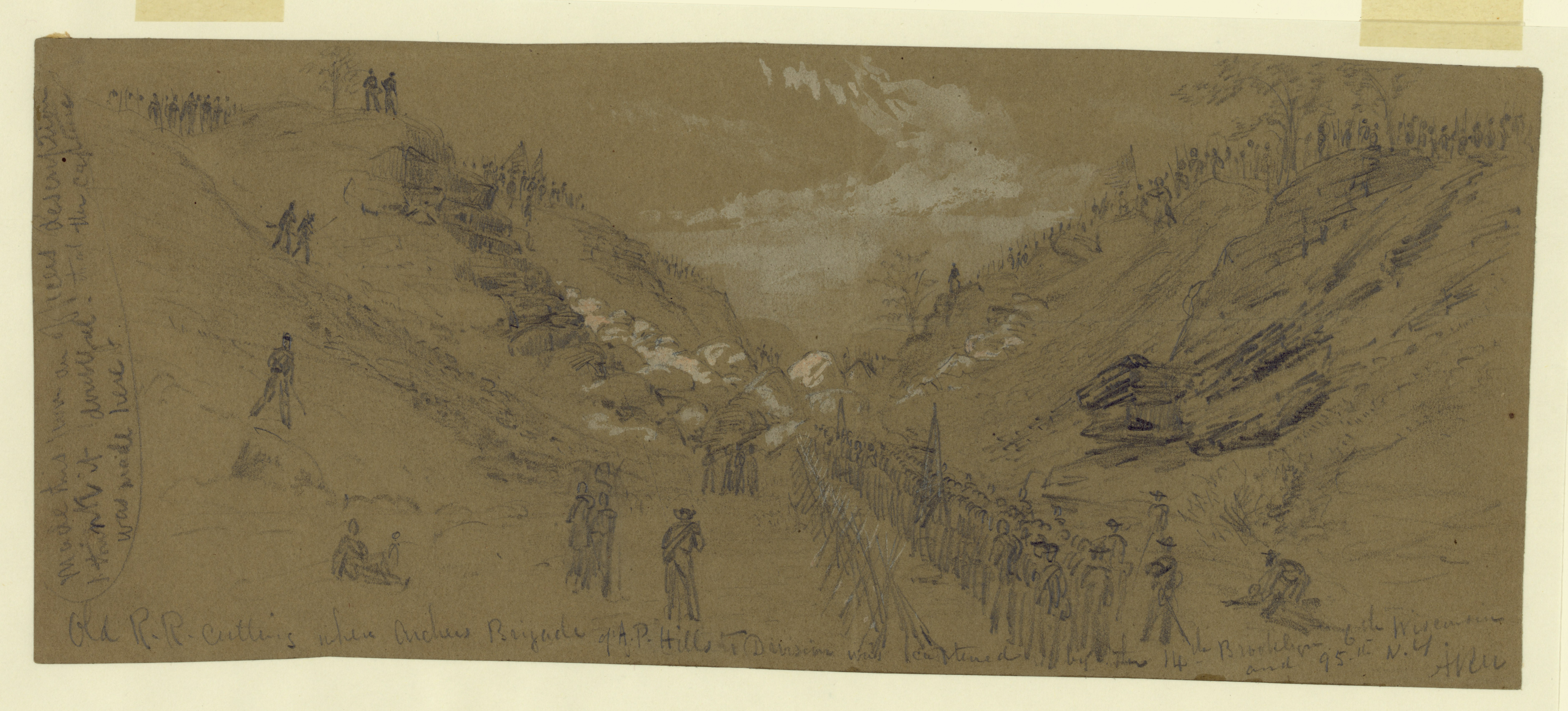
Deeply exaggerated sketch of the RR Cut at Gettysburg

The Iron Brigade would see service in the Overland Campaign of 1864. During the Battle of The Wilderness the 6th Wisconsin, along with the rest of the Iron Brigade, assaulted Confederate lines on May 5. Total losses for the 6th Wisconsin during the Overland Campaign would add up to 140. The regiment would continue to see considerable service till the end of the war.

The regiment participated in the Grand Review of the Armies on May 23, 1865, and then mustered out at Louisville, Kentucky, on July 2, 1865.

== Commanders ==
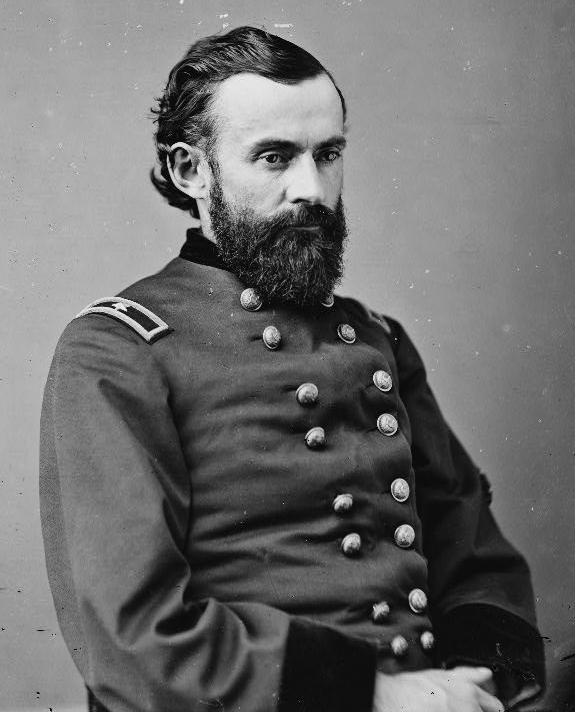
Edward S. Bragg after promotion to brigadier general

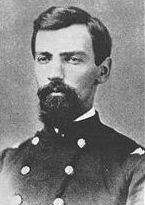
Rufus Dawes as colonel

- Colonel Lysander Cutler (May 28, 1861 – November 29, 1862) was promoted to brigadier general, commanded the Iron Brigade. He served through nearly the entire war and received an honorary brevet to major general.
- Colonel Edward S. Bragg (March 10, 1863 – June 25, 1864) began the war as captain of Co. E. He was later promoted to brigadier general and commanded the Iron Brigade. After the war he became a U.S. congressman and U.S. minister to Mexico.
- Colonel Rufus Dawes (July 5, 1864 – August 9, 1864) began the war as captain of Co. K, and was acting commander of the regiment at the Battle of Gettysburg. He mustered out at the end of his three-year enlistment and received an honorary brevet to brigadier general. After the war, he served as a U.S. congressman and wrote an extensive memoir of his Civil War service. His son, Charles G. Dawes, was the 30th vice president of the United States.
- Colonel John Azor Kellogg (December 10, 1864 – July 14, 1865) began the war as 1st lieutenant of Co. K, and served as adjutant to the brigade commander in 1863 and was a prisoner of war for several months in 1864. He mustered out with the regiment at the end of the war and received an honorary brevet to brigadier general. After the war, he served in the Wisconsin State Senate and wrote a memoir of his time as a prisoner of war.

== Total enlistments and casualties ==
The 6th Wisconsin Infantry initially mustered 1,029 men and later recruited an additional 601 men, for a total of 1,630 men. The regiment lost 16 officers and 228 enlisted men killed in action or who later died of their wounds, plus another 1 officer and 112 enlisted men who died of disease, for a total of 357 fatalities.

6th Wisconsin Infantry, Company Organization
Company	Original Moniker	Primary Place of Recruitment	Captain(s)
A	Sauk County Riflemen	Sauk County and Sheboygan County	Adam Gale Malloy (promoted); David K. Noyes (wounded); Lewis A. Kent (mustered out)
B	Prescott Guards	Pierce County and Still Water, Michigan	Daniel J. Dill (promoted); Rollin P. Converse (DOW); William W. Hutchins (KIA); Henry E. Smyser (mustered out)
C	Prairie du Chien Volunteers	Crawford County and Grant County	Alexander Seymore Hooe (discharged); Thomas W. Plummer (wounded); Edward A. Whaley (mustered out)
D	Montgomery Guards	Milwaukee County	John O'Rourke (resigned); John F. Marsh (wounded); Samuel Birdsall (resigned); Thomas Kerr (promoted); John R. Lammey (DOW); Henry C. Matraw (mustered out)
E	Bragg's Rifles	Fond du lac County and the town of Appleton	Edward S. Bragg (promoted); Edwin A. Brown (KIA); Joseph H. Marston (resigned); Charles P. Hyatt (DOW); Henry T. Garfield (mustered out)
F	Citizen's Corps, Milwaukee	Milwaukee County and Walworth County	William H. Lindwurn (discharged); Fred Schumacher (promoted); Werner Von Bachelle (KIA); Otto Schorse (resigned); Oscar Graetz (KIA); Henry Schildt (mustered out)
G	Beloit Star Rifles	Rock County	Marshall Augustus Northrop (resigned); Philip W. Plummer (promoted); Lewis A. Kent (transferred to Co. A); John Timmons (KIA); Dennis B. Dailey (promoted); Henry Naegely (mustered out)
H	Buffalo County Rifles	Buffalo County	John F. Hauser (promoted); Charles M. Ford (resigned); Albert T. Morgan (mustered out)
I	Anderson Guards	Vernon County and Brown County	Leonard Johnson (resigned); John Azor Kellogg (promoted); Alexander Lowrie (mustered out)
K	Lemonweir Minute Men	Juneau County and Waukesha County	Rufus R. Dawes (promoted); David L. Quaw (resigned); John Ticknor (KIA); William N. Remington (wounded); Andrew Gallop (mustered out)

== Notable people ==
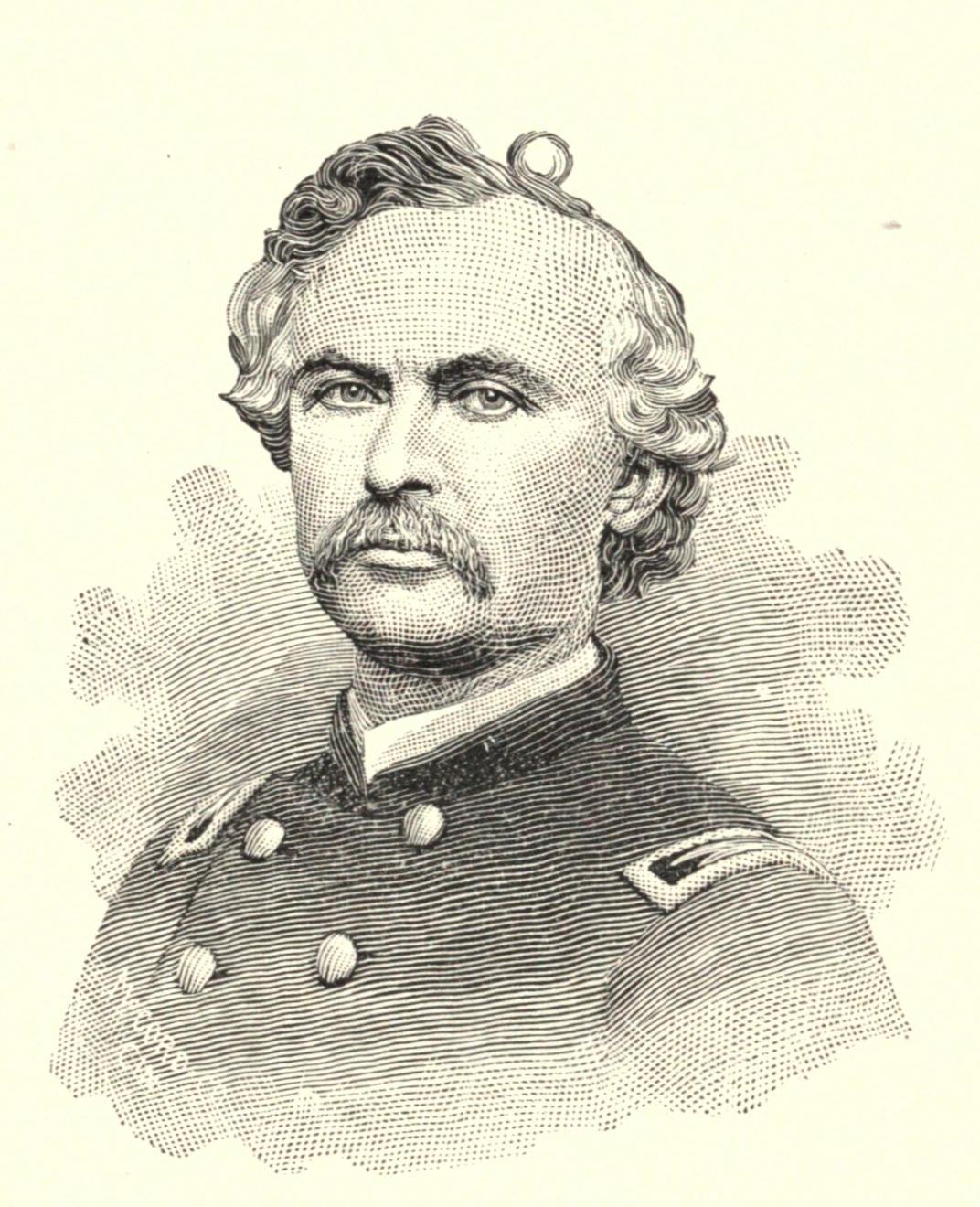
John A. Kellogg

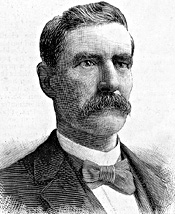
John J. Jenkins

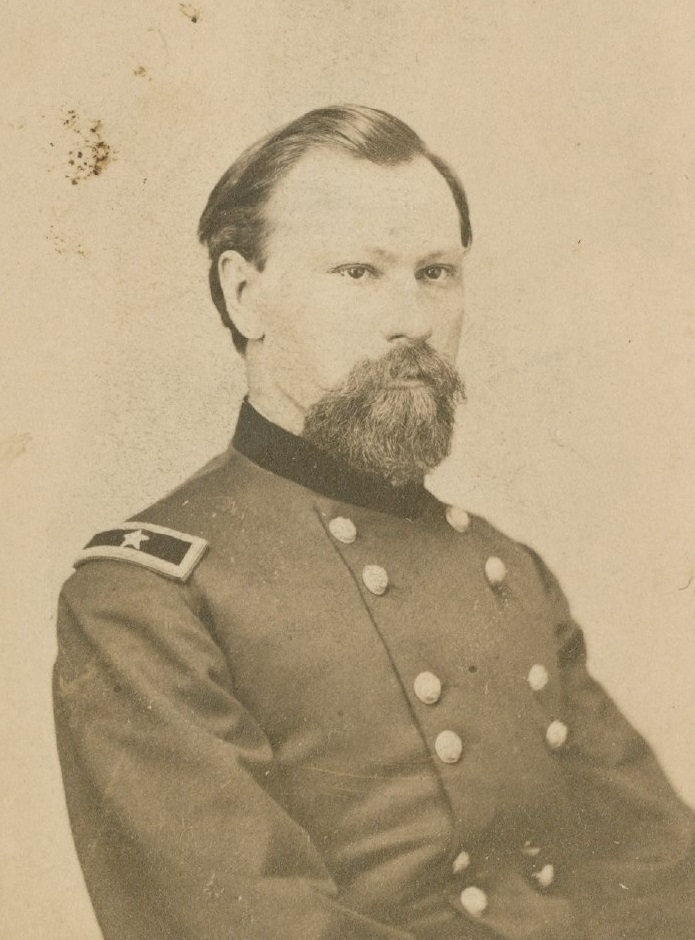
Benjamin J. Sweet

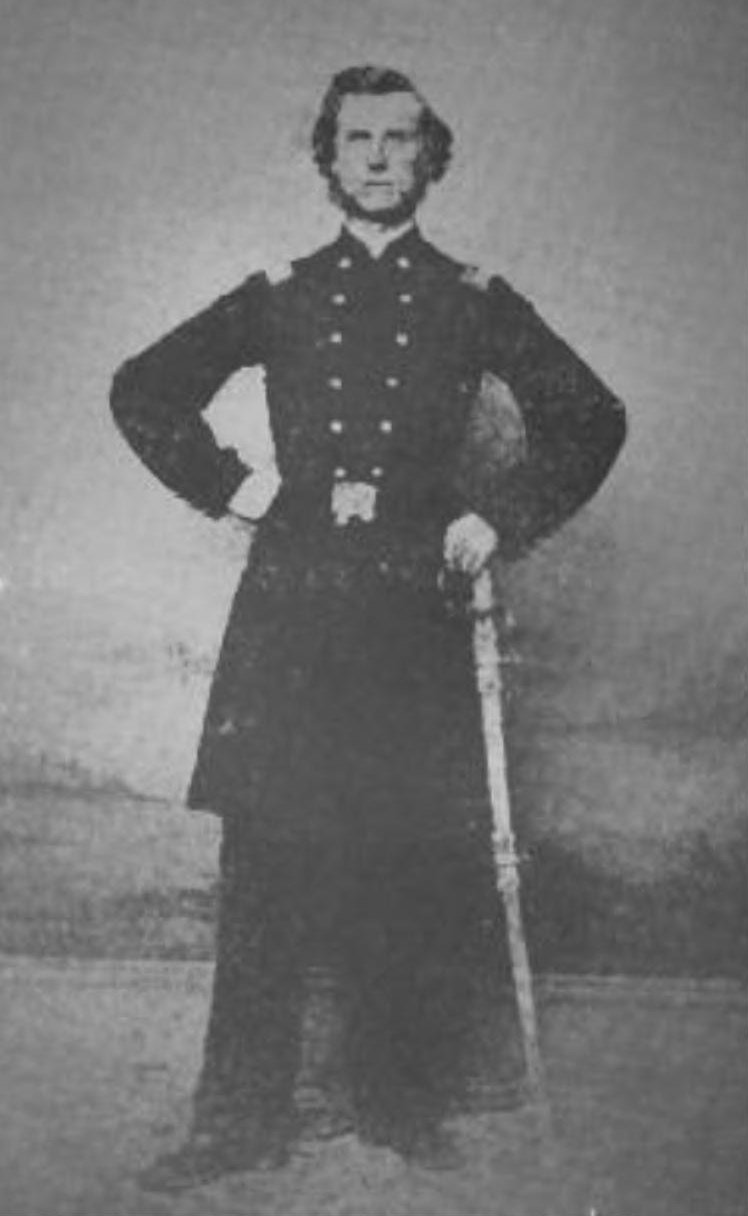
Adam Gale Malloy
- Oscar Bartlett, assistant surgeon, later became chief surgeon for the 3rd Wisconsin Infantry Regiment. Resigned due to disability. Before the war, he had served in the Wisconsin Legislature.
- Edwin Arnold Brown, captain of Co. E, was killed by a cannon ball at Antietam. He was the son of Fond du Lac pioneer Isaac Brown.
- Francis A. Deleglise was a corporal in Co. E and was wounded at Antietam and Gettysburg. After the war he served as a Wisconsin state legislator and was a founder of Antigo, Wisconsin.
- Daniel J. Dill, captain of Co. B, later became colonel of the 30th Wisconsin Infantry Regiment. After the war served as a Wisconsin state legislator.
- John C. Hall, chief surgeon, later served as a Wisconsin state senator.
- Frank A. Haskell, adjutant, became adjutant and staff aide to General John Gibbon, later commissioned colonel of the 36th Wisconsin Infantry Regiment, killed in action at Cold Harbor.
- John J. Jenkins was a private in Co. A. Later in life, he became a seven-term U.S. congressman and a federal judge.
- Robert Lees, private in Co. H, later became first sergeant, wounded at Gettysburg. After the war served as a Wisconsin state senator and county judge.
- James R. Lyon, initially managed a supply wagon, later became a private in Co. I. After the war served as a Wisconsin state legislator.
- Adam Gale Malloy, captain of Co. A, later became colonel of the 17th Wisconsin Infantry Regiment and received an honorary brevet to brigadier general.
- George Davis McDill, private and corporal in Co. I, later became captain of Co. K in the 37th Wisconsin Infantry Regiment. After the war served as a Wisconsin state legislator.
- Albert T. Morgan was captain of Co. H near the end of the war. He previously served as captain of Co. B in the "independent battalion" remnant of the 2nd Wisconsin Infantry Regiment, which was absorbed into the 6th Wisconsin Infantry in November 1864. He received a double-honorary brevet to lieutenant colonel at the end of the war. After the war, he was a Mississippi state senator and wrote a memoir of his experiences in the reconstruction-era south.
- David K. Noyes, first lieutenant and captain in Co. A, severely wounded at Antietam. Later served as lieutenant colonel of the 49th Wisconsin Infantry Regiment. After the war served as a postmaster and newspaper publisher.
- Peter Polin was 2nd lieutenant in Co. H, but resigned before the regiment left Wisconsin. He elected posthumously to the Wisconsin Assembly in 1870, having died the day before the election.
- John Starks, sergeant in Co. A, was the son of Argalus Starks. He was badly wounded at Gainesville, later commissioned captain of Co. K, 23rd Wisconsin Infantry Regiment, and was mortally wounded at Vicksburg.
- Benjamin Sweet, major and lieutenant colonel, later served as colonel of the 21st Wisconsin Infantry Regiment and was badly wounded and disabled at Perryville. Given command of the prisoner-of-war camp Camp Douglas. After the war, received an honorary brevet to brigadier general.
- John Tester, first lieutenant of Co. H, later served as a Wisconsin state legislator.
- Francis A. Wallar was corporal, sergeant, and later 2nd lieutenant in Company I. He was awarded the Medal of Honor for actions at Gettysburg. After the war he was sheriff of Vernon County, Wisconsin.
- Jerome Anthony Watrous, private and sergeant in Co. E, commissioned as adjutant of the regiment and received an honorary brevet to captain. After the war served as a Wisconsin state legislator and historian, and served as a U.S. Army officer in the Spanish–American War.

== Nicknames ==
According to veteran of the 2nd Wisconsin, Cullen B. Aubery, the 6th Wisconsin's regimental nickname while part of the Iron Brigade was "The Calico", also called "The Calico Sixth" or the "Calico Boys". This nickname, according to 6th Wisconsin veteran Rufus Dawes, the original commander of Company K, was derived from the mismatched uniforms first worn by the regiment when it was first mustered into service on July 16, 1861 at Camp Randall.

== See also ==
- Iron Brigade
- List of Wisconsin Civil War units
- Wisconsin in the American Civil War
