= John Wilde (artist) =

American painter, draughtsman and printmaker

- Born: 12 December 1919; Milwaukee, Wisconsin
- Died: 9 March 2006 (aged 86); Cooksville, Wisconsin
- Education: University of Wisconsin–Madison
- Known for: Painter
- Style: Magic realism, Surrealism

John Wilde (Note: Pronunciation: /ˈwɪldiː/, WILL-dee) (December 12, 1919 – March 9, 2006) was an American painter, draughtsman, and printmaker from Wisconsin. He spent the majority of his life in his home state and taught at The University of Wisconsin–Madison for over 35 years. Wilde is often associated with the Magic Realist and Surrealist art movements in the United States. His work frequently featured self-portraits set within fantastical, imaginative landscapes. Wilde taught at the Wisconsin Academy of Sciences, Arts & Letters in 1982 and to the National Academy of Design in New York City in 1993.

== Early life and education ==
John Henry Wilde was born in Milwaukee, Wisconsin on December 12, 1919. He was the youngest of three children. One of John's older brothers, Leslie, would pursue a parallel career in the fine arts, later turning to printmaking. Wilde described having a strong, instinctive love of drawing from an early age, despite a lack of encouragement from his surrounding community.

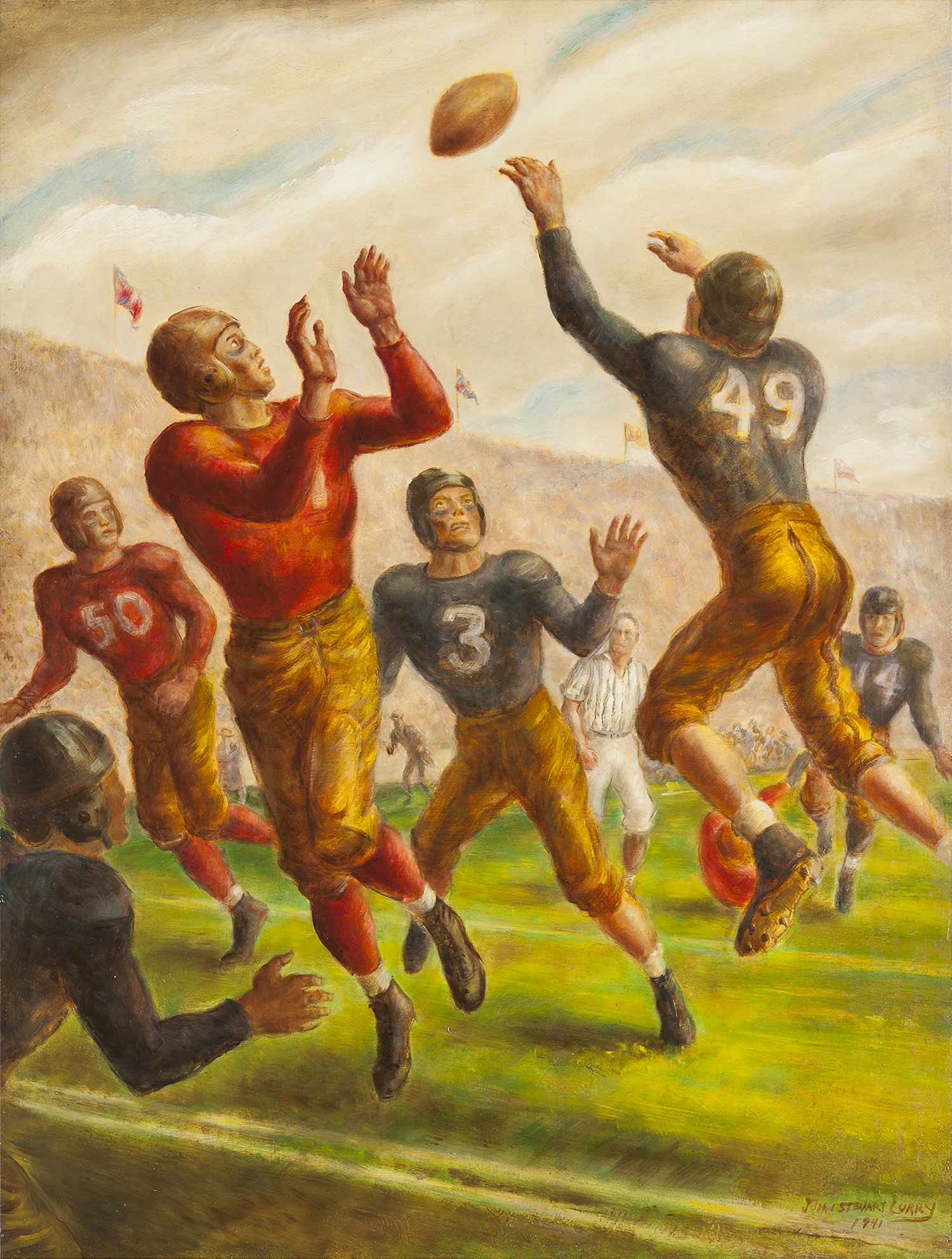
John Steuart Curry, An All-American (Forward Pass) (1941), depicting UW football player David Schreiner.

At a young age, Wilde met Karl Priebe, who also became an artist, and would be a lifelong friend. While in high school, they both visited the Milwaukee studios of painters Santos Zingale and Alfred Sessler, after which Wilde began to consider pursuing drawing as a professional path. A short time later, he began to study informally with Milwaukee painter Paul Lewis Clemens (1911–1992).

Wilde studied at the University of Wisconsin–Madison from 1938 to 1942, graduating with a Bachelor of Science. There, he was influenced by the teachings of art historian Oskar Hagen on early Renaissance art. During his years as a student, Wilde met local artist Marshall Glasier, who held regular salons for students, faculty and art enthusiasts at his parents' home in Madison. Wilde considered these to be "a kind of university within a university."

Glasier and the young artists in his circle rejected the American Regionalist painting of the day, exemplified by the work of John Steuart Curry, the artist-in-residence at the University of Wisconsin from 1936 to 1946. They formed a loosely organized group that included Glasier, Wilde, Priebe, Sylvia Fein, Dudley Huppler, and Gertrude Abercrombie. The group of friends often met at Priebe's studio in Milwaukee and frequented Abercrombie's Chicago home.

Another influence on Wilde's early career was art professor James Watrous. A draughtsman, muralist, mosaicist and art historian, Watrous taught many techniques, including silverpoint, which Wilde would adopt as one of his mediums of choice.

=== Wartime ===
Shortly after graduating from university in 1942, Wilde was drafted into the US Army. He served with the Infantry Air Force and the Office of Strategic Services (OSS). As an artist, he was assigned to produce drawings for the army venereal disease program, and map terrain models for intelligence.

In sketches and private journal entries made at the time, Wilde documented his increasing feeling of hopelessness as his term of service stretched into years. In spite of his deepening depression, Wilde saw broader artistic possibilities in some of his journal sketches, working them into larger drawings that he mailed to his university friend, Dudley Huppler, in Wisconsin.

Upon discharge from the Army in 1946, Wilde returned to the University of Wisconsin–Madison where he studied Art History, graduating with a Master of Science from the School of Education. His thesis dealt with Surrealist artist Max Ernst. Wilde later admitted that the thesis was also a statement against Abstract Expressionism.

== Work ==
=== Text ===
Text has featured in Wilde's drawings. In his early work, this included short notes or pseudo-Latin inscriptions. In the early 1970s, he created a series of ten works known as the "Talking drawings," in which extended written passages occupy much of the page. These drawings often depict solitary figures representing Wilde engaged in everyday activities such as raking, with text functioning as an integral visual element.

=== Nature and the human body ===
From childhood, Wilde took an interest in nature, particularly the cycles of generation, growth, decay, and death. Birds, plants, and flowers appear frequently in his paintings and drawings.

Wilde also explored the human form in his paintings, represented both in surreal contexts and as detailed anatomical studies. His subjects, frequently female, are often nude. Wilde regularly combined plant forms with the human body. In her analysis of To Make Strawberry Jam, writer, Donna Gold, compared Wilde's composition of the female figure in close association with strawberry plants to Renaissance paintings. Wilde admired North European Renaissance artists after learning about them from James Watrous's seminars on historical drawing and painting techniques, and his work references Renaissance motifs such as "Death and the Maiden".

According to curator Sara Krajewski,

"Surrealism best enables [Wilde] to represent the mind's activity and the pervasive forces of sex and death. Bones, dead animals and scenes of decay serve as memento mori, symbolic reminders of one's mortality. Naked women, or strangely mutated women-creatures, populate deep, dream-like landscapes."

=== Autobiographical work ===
Sara Krajewski stated that "Frequently Wilde paints himself into a scene, as if to acknowledge that this is a world where he confronts his own fears and desires."

In an early example from 1955, Wisconsin Wildeworld (1955), subtitled Provincia, Naturlica and Classicum (currently held in the Milwaukee Art Museum's (MAM) collection) (Note: The artwork was created between November 14, 1953 and August 30, 1955. It is an oil on canvas, 32½ inches tall and 52 inches wide. It was given to the Museum by Mr. and Mrs. Fitzhugh Scott through Northwoods Foundation.) Wilde is depicted from behind, holding a drawing board under his arm. He points toward a blue-tinted landscape: on the right, Renaissance-inspired classical ruins, and on the left, a Midwestern residential street.

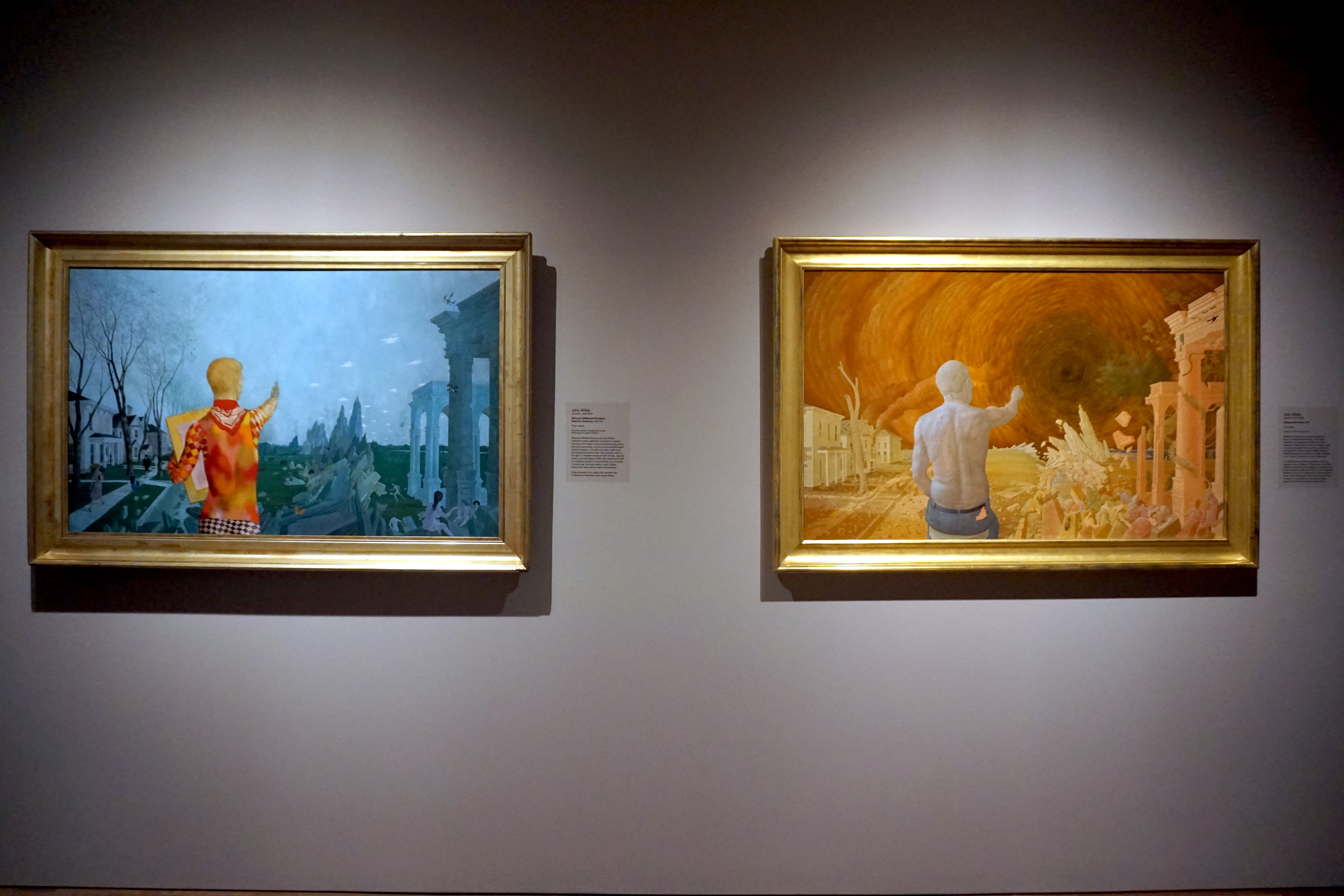
Wisconsin Wildeworld (1955) and Wildeworld Revisited (1995) displayed side-by-side at the Milwaukee Art Museum

Forty years later, in 1995, Wilde created a companion and comparison piece, Wildeworld Revisited, where the landscape, now created using a reddish colour palette, depicts an older Wilde and a barren, partly destroyed and decaying landscape. Wilde no longer holds a drawing board, and only points toward a vortex in the sky. This work has recently been acquired by the MAM, to join its forerunner.

Around the time of Wildeworld Revisited, Wilde was creating other "reconsidered" works. For example, in paintings such as Myself in 1944 contemplating the Following 60 Years (2004), he revisited drawings from his wartime journal.

Other examples of Wilde's autobiographical imagery include two silverpoint works: the memento mori landscape Muss es sein (1979–1981) and The Great Autobiographical Silverpoint Drawing (1983–1984). Both works feature a nude or semi-nude figure who represents Wilde.

=== Interest in Stendhal's Duchess of Sanseverina ===
Wilde was repeatedly inspired by the character Gina, Duchess of Sanseverina, in Stendhal's novel The Charterhouse of Parma. This first featured in his early 1950s in paintings such as Further Festivities at the Contessa Sanseverini's (1950–51) and More Festivities at the Palazzo Sanseverini (1951–52). Later, he revisited the theme in Nighttime Festivities at the Contessa Sanseverini's (1966) and Still Further Festivities at the Contessa Sanseverini's (1991). His final painting in the theme was A Grand Finale at the Contessa Severini's (1996–97), a panoramic painting nearly eight feet wide depicting a landscape populated by figures, animals, and objects drawn from earlier work, including two figures resembling the artist holding revolvers.

=== Homages to other artists ===
In his later career, Wilde painted homages to his favourite artists. This included: Piero di Cosimo (particularly his "Perseus Rescuing Andromeda"), Richard Dadd, Alfred Rethal, Otto Runge, Otto Dix, Max Ernst, Arnold Böcklin, friends Julia Thecla and Gertrude Abercrombie, and the Pre-Raphaelite Brethren.

His four-piece "An Homage to Lorenzo Lotto" (I-IV) (1985) is based on Lotto's "Allegory of Virtue and Vice" (1505).

In an even more specific homage, his 1998 painting "My Art Targets," presents facsimile signatures of 38 favourite artists, including Durer, Uccello, Urs Graf, Baldung Gruen, Altdorfer, Brueghel, Watteau, Ingres, Messonnier, Eakins, Homer, Cezanne, Puvis, Dix, Di Chirico, and Ernst, among 22 others.

=== Print collaborations ===
Wilde's 7 Kiefers, printed by Warrington Colescott in 1987

Though he considered printmaking to lack the subtlety of drawing, Wilde was eventually convinced by a number of colleagues to experiment with different techniques and media late in his career. His first prints, which included etchings and lithographs, were created between 1974 and 1977 in collaboration with Stephen J. Weitz, a graduate student at the University of Wisconsin–Madison at the time.

Among Wilde's other print collaborators were:

- Walter Hamady, book artist and fellow faculty member at the university, with whom he published several books between 1971 and 2001
- Warrington Colescott, whose publishing house in Hollandale, Wisconsin, issued Wilde's series 7 Kiefers and 8 Russets
- Harvey Littleton, whose studios in Spruce Pine, North Carolina published three of Wilde's vitreographs: The Kiss (1996), Portrait of Joan (1996), and Three Trees (1998)
- Tandem Press at the University of Wisconsin–Madison, for Wildeview II (1985)
- Andrew Balkin, with whom Wilde worked on an aquatint and Dry point design for the Wisconsin Sesquicentennial Portfolio (2001)

== Teaching ==
From 1948 to 1982, Wilde taught drawing at the University of Wisconsin–Madison. There, he was awarded the title of Alfred Sessler Distinguished Professor of Art in 1968. He was one of a number of artists who began to teach at the University after WWII, including printmakers Alfred Sessler (1909–1963) and Warrington Colescott (1921–2018), painter Gibson Byrd (1923–2002), and glass artist Harvey Littleton (1922–2013). (Note: Sessler taught at the University of Wisconsin–Madison from 1945 until his death in 1963, Colescott from 1949 until his retirement in 1986, and Littleton from 1952 until his retirement in 1976.)

Wilde's teaching methods included life drawing and critical writing.

Some of his notable students included book illustrator Nancy Ekholm Burkert (born 1933), multimedia artist Bruce Nauman (born 1941), and painter and film director Wynn Chamberlain (1927–2014). In October 1989, Wilde headed a group exhibit at Garver Gallery, Madison, with 17 of his former students. He designed the exhibition poster based on a silverpoint print depicting each participant as an apple-head appearing in the horizon.

== Public collections ==
Wilde's artwork is in the collections of museums throughout the United States, including:

- The Art Institute of Chicago
- The Carnegie Museum of Art, Pittsburgh, Pennsylvania
- Pennsylvania Academy of Fine Arts, Philadelphia
- Santa Barbara Museum of Art
- Smithsonian American Art Museum
- Walker Art Center, Minneapolis
- The Whitney Museum of American Art, New York
- The Madison Museum of Contemporary Art, Wisconsin
- The Chazen Museum of Art at the University of Wisconsin, Madison
- The Milwaukee Art Museum, Wisconsin
- The Racine Art Museum, Wisconsin
- The Leigh Yawkey Woodson Art Museum in Wausau, Wisconsin

The Tory Folliard Gallery in Milwaukee has represented John Wilde since 1993 and his estate since 2015.

== Personal life ==
John Wilde and his wife Helen had two children, Jonathan and Phoebe Wilde. After Helen's death in 1966, Wilde married Shirley Grilley. He had three stepchildren, his stepchildren are Robert, Dorian and Rinalda Grilley.

Wilde lived in or near Evansville and Cooksville, Rock County, Wisconsin for most of his adult life.

== Bibliography ==
- Becker, Jack; Escalante, Tamara (2006). John Wilde: A Retrospective. Milwaukee, WI: Tory Folliard Gallery.
- Krajewski, Sara (1998). John Wilde: Catalogue of an Exhibition. Madison, WI: Madison Art Center.
- Wolff, Theodore F. (1999). Wildeworld: The Art of John Wilde. Madison, WI: Elvehjem Museum of Art. ISBN 978-1555951597.
- Levy, Hannah Heidi (2004). Famous Wisconsin Artists and Architects. Oregon, WI: Badger Books. ISBN 978-1932542127.
- Cozzolino, Robert (2005). With Friends: Six Magic Realists, 1940-1965. Madison, WI: Elvehjem Museum of Art. ISBN 978-0932900005.
- Duncan, Michael (2006). "Heretics of the Heartland". Art in America. 94 (2). Penske Media Corporation: 98–103.
