= Gibson Byrd =

American painter

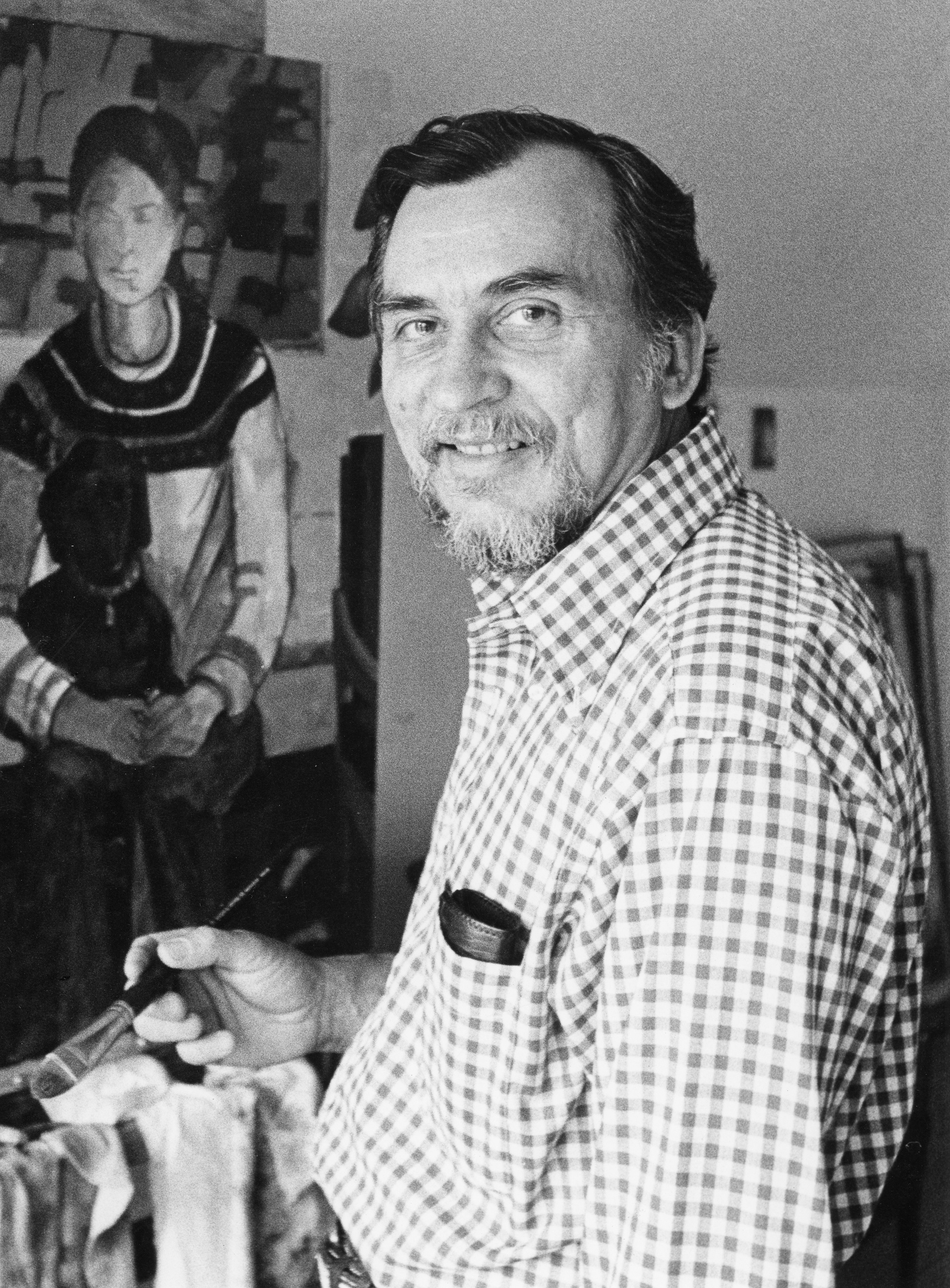
- Born: Decatur Gibson Byrd; February 1, 1923; Tulsa, Oklahoma
- Died: April 16, 2002 (aged 79); Del Mar, California
- Education: University of Tulsa and University of Iowa.
- Known for: Figurative and Landscape painter

Decatur Gibson Byrd (1923–2002), was an American painter of Shawnee ancestry known for landscape and figurative paintings. He was a master of coloristic subtleties and atmospheric effects, and his work often emphasized social commentary and injustice, and the angst and banality of modern materialism.

== Life and career ==
Byrd was born and raised in Tulsa, Oklahoma, attended Central High School and was a member of the first graduating class of Will Rogers High. During World War II, he served as a B-17 engineer and top turret gunner. After the war, Byrd received his B.A. in Art from the University of Tulsa in 1949 and obtained an M.A. of Fine Arts from the University of Iowa in 1950. After graduation, he taught art at Central High School in Tulsa from 1950 to 1952. From 1952 to 1955, he was the Director of the Kalamazoo Art Center, and lectured at the University of Michigan Extension Division. He was married to Benita Springer and had two children. He joined the University of Wisconsin-Madison Art Department faculty in 1955, taught until retiring due to Parkinson’s disease in 1985, and then was Professor Emeritus until 2002. At the UW-Madison, Byrd was a contemporary of other prominent artists including Aaron Bohrod, Warrington Colescott, Raymond Gloeckler, Walter Hamady, Harvey Littleton, Alfred Sessler, John Wilde, and Santos Zingale. A painter and an educator, he served at various times as Department Chairman (notably from 1967-1969), Graduate Chairman, and Undergraduate Chairman. During 1965–1966, he was Visiting Lecturer at the School of Art Education at the Birmingham College of Arts and Crafts in Birmingham, England.

Byrd’s Midwestern visual art legacy can be seen through his contribution as an educator, mentor and an advocate for the arts within the community; and his artistic achievements, especially his focus on social fairness and injustice and his enduring depictions of Wisconsin landscapes. Byrd had compelling integrity as both an artist and a teacher. James Auer stated in a December 18, 1988 Milwaukee Journal article “Retrospective Recognition” that “He is influential both as a master of art works and as a skilled and empathetic teacher.” As an instructor he regularly taught drawing, painting and art education, sharing his skills as a draftsman and colorist, including his distinctive palette and multi-textured painting techniques.

His commitment to art education was showcased in several publications on art education in the 1960s while serving as a board member of the Institute for the Study of Art In Education. Byrd was extremely active and engaged in a wide range of public service and outreach activities tied to the larger art community in Wisconsin. He served on numerous UW committees throughout his tenure, such as the Elvehjem (Chazen) Art Center planning, building and policy committees. He was also often asked to serve on various committees owing to his Shawnee heritage, such as the student-faculty ad hoc Committee on Native American programs and the Native American Studies Committee. A strong advocate for Wisconsin art and artists, he served at various times as: Vice President for Operations, Board Member, and Acquisitions Committee Member of the Madison Art Center; a member of the Artist’s advisory board, Cudahy Gallery of Wisconsin Art, Milwaukee Art Center; and was a regular award/prize juror for art exhibits throughout Wisconsin.

== Themes and Styles ==
Byrd’s interest in figurative painting started in the early 1950s, and this work emphasized social realism, angst and banality in the twentieth century, and auto-biographical fantasy.

Early influences on Byrd included the abstract expressionists and modernists Lyonel Feininger, Willem de Kooning, John Marin, and Mark Rothko, as well as the realist Edward Hopper. Around 1980 Byrd turned away from a narrative, psychological approach and focused his work on the rural landscapes, receiving widespread recognition for this shift in style that emphasized composition, lighting, and mood. These landscapes mostly focused on rural southern Wisconsin (including a 10-foot square oil painting modeled on a landscape near Cross Plains that welcomed passengers to the Dane County Regional Airport for more than a decade starting in 1988), and coastal southern California, near Carlsbad, where he retired to in 1991. His strong feel for landscapes was in part derived from his Indian heritage - his grandmother was a Shawnee Indian and he was a qualified member of the Shawnee Tribe. Although best known as an oil painter, he also worked in other mediums, notably gouache and pastel.

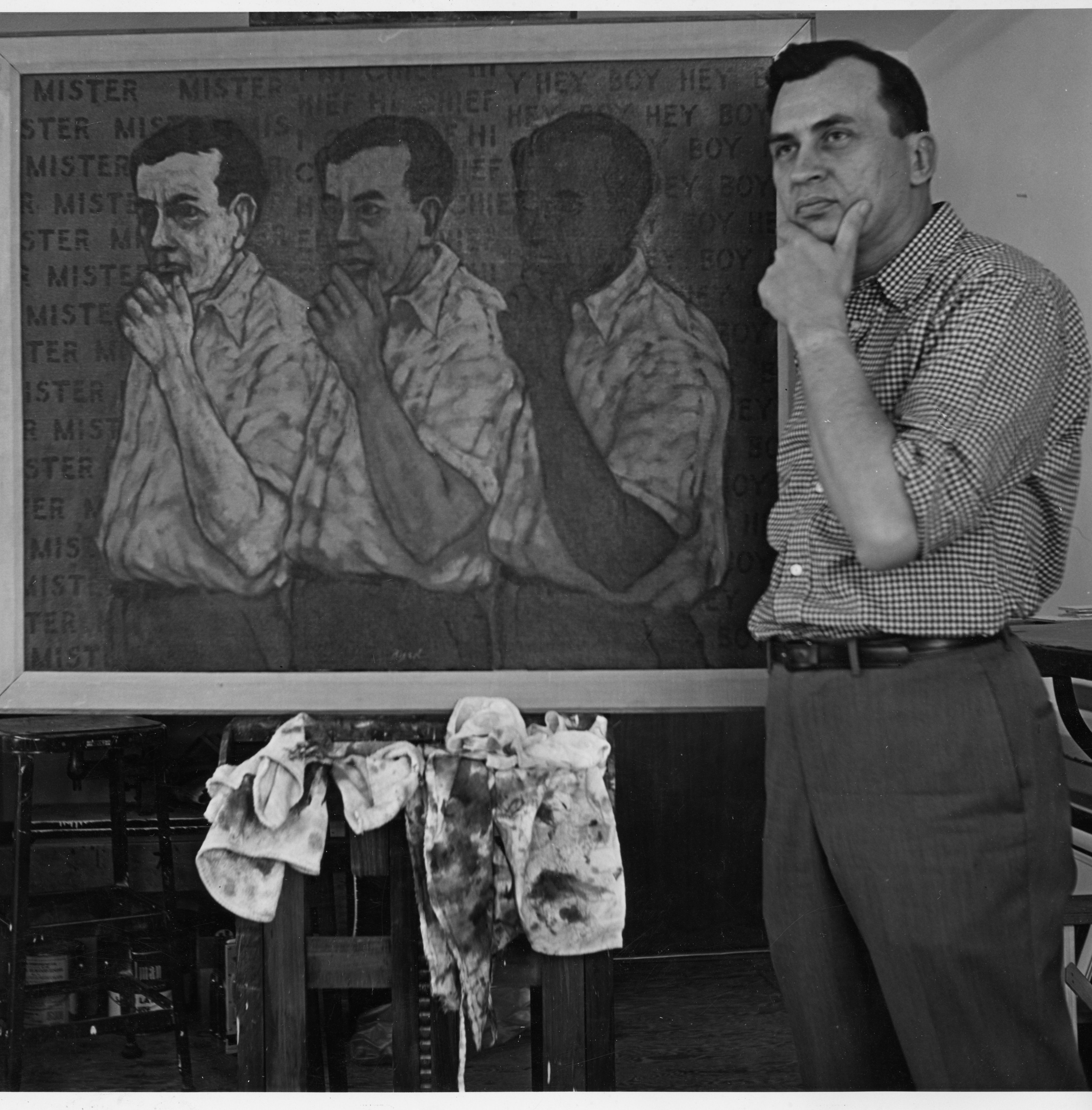
Artist Gibson Byrd posing in studio with painting "The Difference" (1965) - note background stenciled words change with skin complexion from "Mister" to "Hi Chief" to "Hey Boy"

An artist-observer, Byrd’s work explored human loneliness and isolation, frequently provided social commentary, showcased social fairness and justice, and often lampooned the status quo and materialism. “His subject matter is very much of our time: anomie and alienation, military service and domesticity, flashy commercialism and enduring values; the interrelationship between the artifact and natural environment and formal invention”. Byrd’s work in the 1950s reflected an interest in interiors and everyday life. By 1962, he was increasingly concerned about the implications of his Shawnee Indian ancestry, a topic he returned through throughout his life and explored through social commentary that emphasized racial bias, and the national struggle for equality (for example “Incident”, an exhibit-winning piece which was hung in the Madison WI mayor’s office, and "The Difference"). In the early 1970s, Byrd shifted inward working autobiographically exploring life stages. Subsequently, he painted spartan and geometric interiors, often populated with strange assortments of figures, animate and inanimate, clad and unclad, conveying a perceptible aura of unease.

In a haunting series of paintings and a poem, Byrd explored his complex feelings toward a Tulsa home. It was where he grew up, and where his father died when Byrd was 10, and a year later his older brother died in the same house. As he noted in a 1976 interview, “Memory is an emotional creature. It changes as other things change. It expands and contracts… I have been trying to bring about some meeting of the past and present.”. In doing so, Byrd painted the house as it appears today and in the conflicting ways he remembered it.

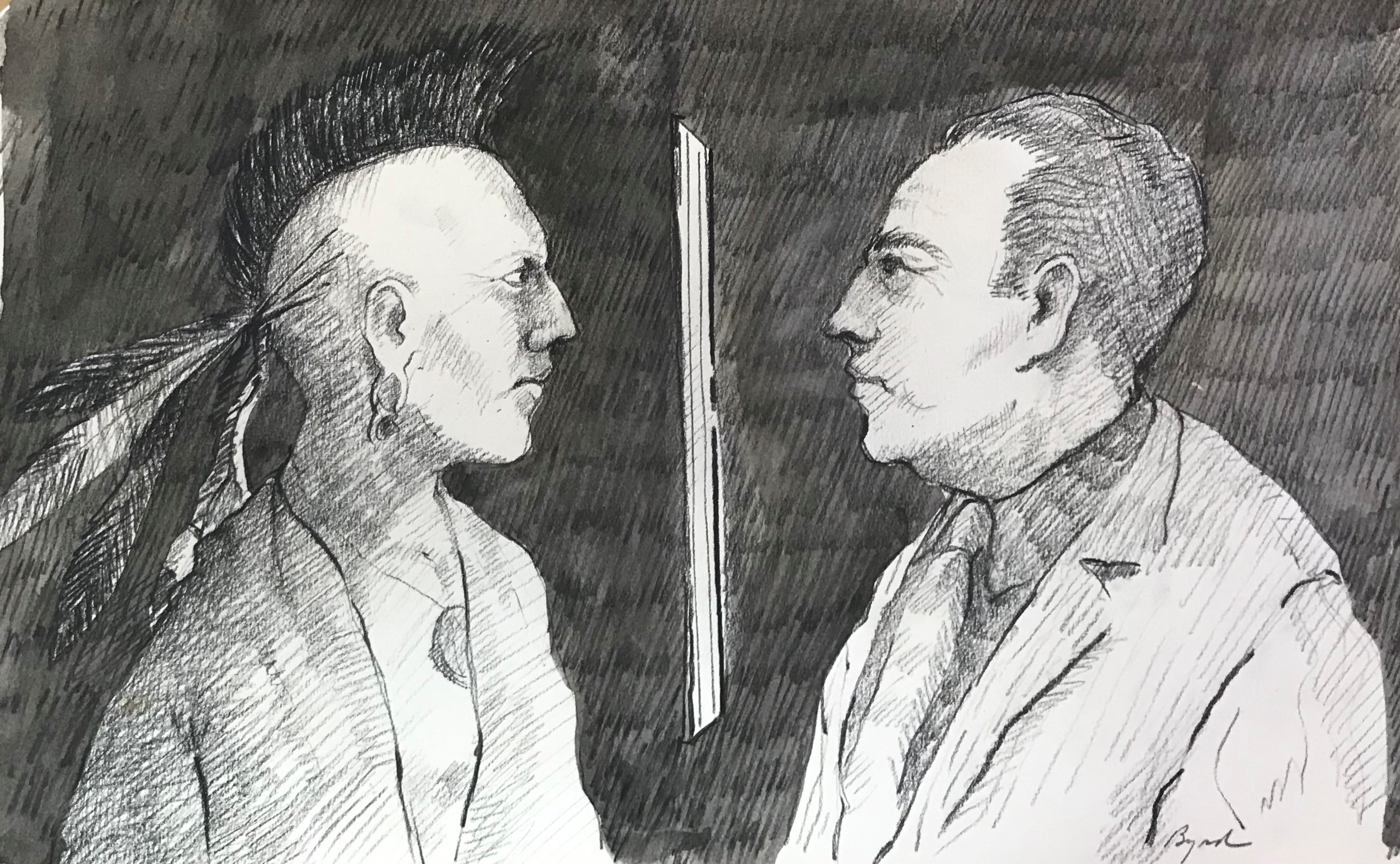
Through the Glass (1970s), pen and ink on paper artwork by Gibson Byrd exploring his Shawnee heritage

Artistically exploring his Shawnee heritage was a recurring theme. In doing so, he would “sort of fool around with the idea, putting past and present together in various combinations”, even showing himself as a Plains Indian, an intentional inaccuracy (1976 interview). A particularly vivid memory he drew upon was a pow wow his Shawnee father took him to when he was around seven and his disappointment that people were in working clothes and not full regalia. “I realize looking back that I probably attended a ‘real’ pow wow not a public one. But I still remember the drumming.”

Byrd shifted to painting rural landscapes in 1979, soon after being diagnosed with Parkinson’s disease. He noted “It is liberating. It lets your sprits soar at bit” and that “The quality of light is very amazing to me”. These elaborately layered, and richly evocative scenes often had atypical lighting conditions, with highlighted rear-lit trees, shadows cast by the rise and set of the sun and moon, and rare violet haze. They also reveal a mastery of implied perspective, defining nuances of distance through glowing planes of subtly differentiated color, often vibrating with deep and complex emotion (see examples). As his physical skills declined, elaborately layered oils gave way to rich translucent pastels often with simplified pictorial elements emphasizing light, shadow and form. Powerful evocations of the natural world, they seemingly blur the distinction between landscape as memory, and landscape as experience. This remarkable shift to landscapes in his mid-50s while dealing with a physically-debilitating disease was extremely well-received by critics and collectors, and his shows during this productive decade regularly sold out.

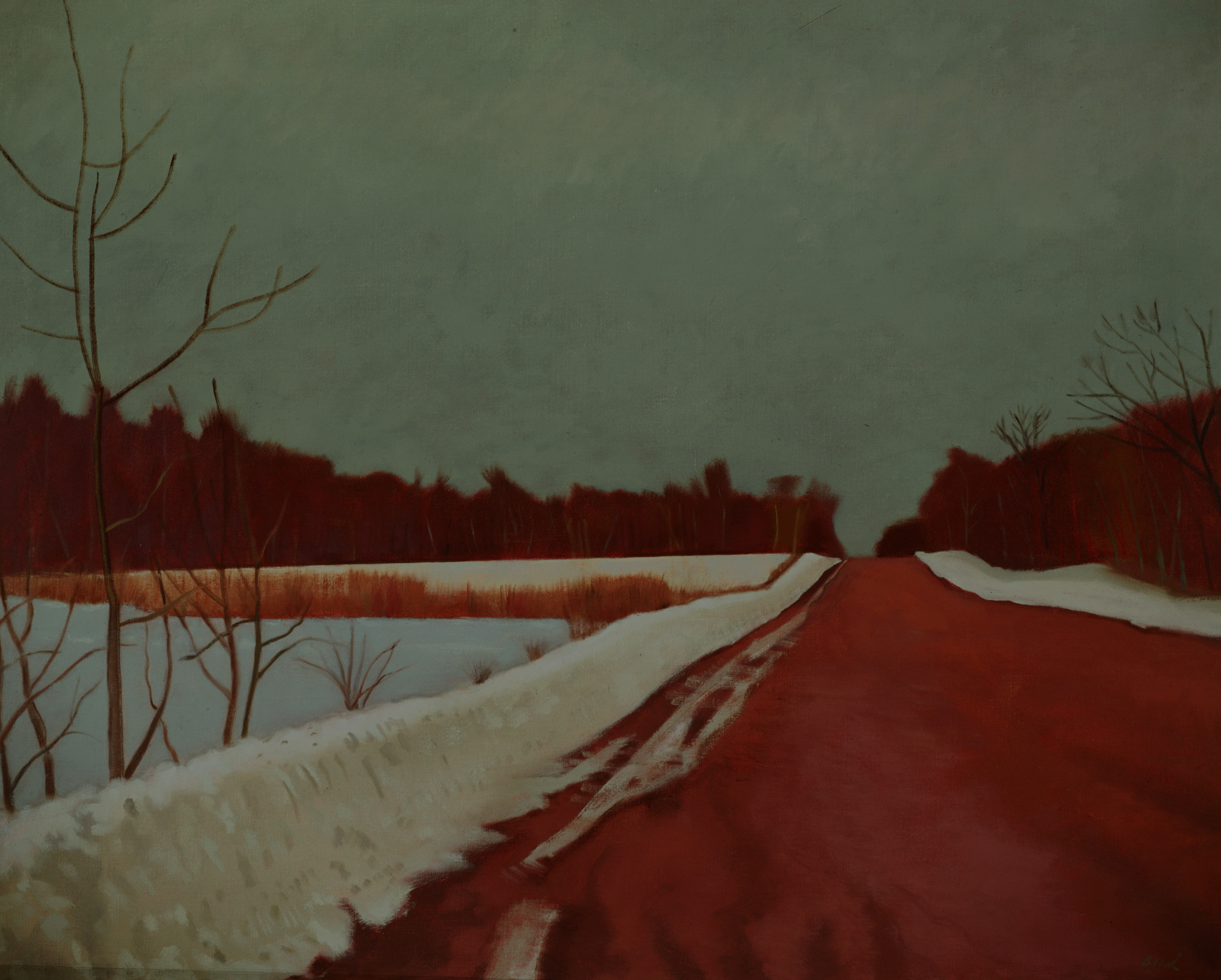
Country Road in Winter (1984), 40x32 inch oil on canvas painting by Gibson Byrd of rural Wisconsin

A common theme in reviews of his exhibits (including 1988 and 2008 retrospectives) was surprise and disappointment that his work is not as well-recognized nationally as it should be. Byrd’s willingness to explore and change topics and approaches has in some ways defied placing him in a single category, perhaps lessening his recognition and appreciation of the full body of his work. His lack of interest in self-promotion (a trait consistent with his upbringing) also contributed to the situation. Throughout his career, however, Byrd delighted followers with his essential unpredictability, willingness to explore new subjects, and challenge himself even while dealing with a debilitating disease.

== Notable Collections ==
Byrd’s paintings were frequently exhibited across the United States in competitive, invitation, and one-person exhibits from 1949-1991, especially throughout the greater Midwest and most extensively in Wisconsin. His work has been periodically exhibited since then, including a 2008 retrospective (Dean Jensen Gallery, Milwaukee), and a 2020 one-person exhibit at the Shawnee Tribe Cultural Center, Miami, Oklahoma. Paintings by Byrd are in many public and private collections, mostly in the Midwest. Notably, his art is part of public collections in more than two dozen institutions throughout the US, and particularly well-represented in Wisconsin.

The largest collections are those of the Kohler Foundation, Wisconsin (which obtained 55 paintings from the artist's family); along with the Museum of Wisconsin Art; the Madison Museum of Contemporary Art; the Chazen Museum of Art, University of Wisconsin-Madison, the Shawnee Tribe, Miami, Oklahoma; and the University of Tulsa. Other public collections include: the Butler Institute of American Art, the Milwaukee Art Museum, the Bergstrom-Mahler Museum, Dane County Wisconsin, Edgewood College, the Kalamazoo Institute of Arts, the Madison Art Center, the Philbrook Museum of Art, Racine Art Museum, Rahr West Museum, San Diego State University, the Wright Museum of Art Beloit College, the University of Wisconsin (UW) Madison Memorial Union, UW-Eu Claire, UW Center Fox Valley, UW-Green Bay, UW-La Crosse, UW-Milwaukee, UW-Parkside, UW-Sheboygan, UW-Stevens Point, UW Center Waukesha, the Wisconsin Historical Society, and the Wisconsin State Museum.

== Gibson Byrd Publications ==
- “Introduction”: William King’s Southwest, edited by Champion-Price, Toomey and White. Published by the Texas Center for Writers Press, 1976.
- Book Review: “The De-definition of Art” by Harold Rosenberg. Studies in Art
- Education, Vo. 15, No. 2, 1973-74.
- Book Review: “Ben Shahn” by John D. Morris, Editor. Studies in Art Education, Fall 1972.
- “Artists and Art Museums: Reminiscences and Little Realities”. The Wisconsin Monographs of Visual Arts Education, Spring 1972, pp. 18–27.
- The House. Original poem and drawing printed by Joseph Wilfer as a broadside.
- “Thomas Hart Benton” Exhibition Catalogue, The Madison Art Center, 1970.
- “Visiting Artists: Thoughts and Second Thoughts,” Visual Arts Education, Spring 1970.
- Article: “Artist-Teacher in American: Thomas Eakins,” School Arts Magazine, 1965.
- Informal Remarks: Published in “In Retrospect: Alfred Sessler”, Arts in Society, Vol. 3, No. 1, 1964.
- Monograph: Theodore Robinson, University of Wisconsin Exhibition Catalogue, 1964.
- Chapter VII: “Exhibits and Public Relations: in Art Education in the Junior High School, published by the National Art Education Association, Washington, D.C., 1964.
- “Problems and Challengers” in the “Art and the Wisconsin Idea” issue of Western Arts Bulletin, Vol 48:1, 1963-65.
- Article: “The Artist-Teacher in America”, The Art Journal, XXIII/2, Winter 1963-64.
- Editor, Curriculum in Art for the Secondary Schools, published by the State Department of Public Instruction, 1963.
