= Sylvia Solochek Walters =

American artist, printmaker (b. 1938)

- Born: Sylvia Solochek; 1938 (age 87–88); Milwaukee, Wisconsin, United States
- Education: University of Wisconsin–Madison,
- Occupations: Visual artist, educator
- Known for: Printmaking, woodcuts, drawing, collage, painting, book design
- Spouse: Jim Walters
- Website: Sylvia Solochek Walters

Sylvia Solochek Walters (born 1938) is an American artist and educator. She has produced drawings, paintings and collage works in her career, but is best known for complex woodcut prints created through the "reduction and stencil" process. Her work combines elements of realist, decorative and formalist art, flat and illusionistic space, and varied patterning and textures. She has largely focused on portraits, still lifes and domestic interiors, and collage-like combinations of personal symbolism—concerns that writers often align with early feminist art.

Sylvia Solochek Walters, Summer Self-Portrait, woodcut and relief plate, 22" x 22", 1977.

Walters has exhibited internationally and at the Milwaukee Art Museum, St. Louis Art Museum, Chazen Museum of Art, and Nelson-Atkins Museum of Art. Her work belongs to the public art collections of the Fine Arts Museums of San Francisco, New York Public Library and Library of Congress, among others. She has received awards from the National Endowment for the Arts, national printmaking competitions, and publishing organizations, for her book design and editing. Walters served as a longtime professor and chairperson in the art department at San Francisco State University before retiring as Professor Emerita of Art in 2009. She lives and works In Oakland, California.

== Early life and career ==
Sylvia Solochek was born in 1938 and raised by a traditional Jewish family in Milwaukee. In 1956, she enrolled at University of Wisconsin–Madison, where she earned BS, MS and MFA (1960–2) degrees, working in a figurative style that bucked the era's dominant Abstract Expressionism. The school was one of three Midwestern centers—with University of Iowa and University of Indiana, Bloomington—leading a printmaking renaissance in the United States; its faculty included renowned printmakers Warrington Colescott, Dean Meeker, and Alfred Sessler who, in addition to German Expressionism and Japanese woodblock prints, particularly influenced Walters. During this time, she won acceptance to several national print shows, which would continue throughout her career.

After graduating, Walters taught art—a rarity for women then—at schools in New York, Wisconsin and Nebraska while working as a book designer and making art. In 1969, after a move with her husband Jim Walters to St. Louis, she began teaching at University of Missouri, St. Louis (UMSL) and became active in organizations such as the Community of Women Artists (CWA) and Art Coordinating Council of the Area (ACCA). She served as director of the UMSL Gallery for ten years, developing public panel discussions and exhibitions such as "American Women Printmakers" (1975), which included work by Louise Nevelson, Judy Chicago, Pat Steir and herself. In 1977, she founded and became the first chairperson of the school's new independent art department.

Sylvia Solochek Walters, And Ruth Said, woodcut, 11.5" x 23.75", 1967.

In 1984, Walters moved to San Francisco, where she was hired as chairperson of San Francisco State University's art department, serving in that post until 2004, before retiring as Professor Emerita in 2009. She also wrote essays for catalogues and publications including Print Commentary, Journal of the Print World and The California Printmaker, on women and African-American printmakers and artists such as Warrington Colescott, John Gutmann, Chiura Obata and Ruth Weisberg.

=== Work and technique ===
Walters is best known for hand-printed, "reduction and stencil" woodcut prints exploring genres including portraiture, still life and interiors. In that process, a single woodblock is used for the entire print rather than one block for each color; once a color is printed using a stencil to limit the ink flow, that part of the block is cut away and the process is repeated for the next color. By printing through stencils in specific areas, she achieves surprisingly varied and refined textures, shading, and details that contrast with the hard-edged, splintery look typically associated with woodcuts. She has generally worked on small editions of complex prints—often featuring 20 to 60 colors—one at a time over a period of eight to ten months, producing between one and four per year.

Walters's mature style is noted for its subtle color and texture, abundant use of patterning to create pictorial interest, and drawing that has been compared to Philip Pearlstein and ranges from vigorous to delicate. Describing her print Summer Self-Portrait (1977) in American Color Woodcuts: Bounty from the Block, 1880s–1990s, artist and art historian James Watrous summed up such work as "gracious in likeness and elegant in artistic ordering, with a sublimation of subject and sensitivity to form."

=== Early work (1962–1971) ===
Much of Walters's work in the 1960s focused on expressive black-and-white woodcuts and lithographs of metaphorical and allegorical human figures, often Old Testament subjects or musicians. St. Louis Post-Dispatch writer Mary King described the "vertically curling and knotting" central form of the woodcut Fragment I as an "agitated tower of textures and line shapes" that was "only incidentally a figure." Depicted in thorny, ropy lines that thickened into shapes, divided or slid into one another like branches or flowing liquid, they drew comparisons to the work of Leonard Baskin. In a review of her 1964 solo exhibition, Milwaukee Journal critic Donald Key suggested her bold, spiraling and stretched linear patterns evoked rising musical passages or the vibration of string tones (e.g., Small Musician After Degas). Her densely worked Biblical works—some incorporating Hebrew writing—evoke archetypes and symbols that critics characterized as dream-like, somber and mysterious.

Walters complemented her early printmaking with brightly colored, more personal pastel drawings and oil paintings of figures, still lifes and scenes such as Umbrellascape, a nearly abstract, rhythmic composition of overlapping beach umbrellas and furniture. By the end of the decade, she had incorporated the intensity of this work into prints centered on realistic, monumental images of emblematic women. In a 1971 solo show, she exhibited such prints (e.g., Bazaar I, Shield I, Byzantine Becky), which paired forthright portraits and symbolic motifs suggesting subconscious processes with subtle surfaces, blazing color, and diverse drawn and stamped patterns.

Sylvia Solochek Walters, Seven Lemons, woodcut and relief plate, 22" x 22", 1976.

=== Mature work (1972– ) ===
In the 1970s in St Louis, Walters's work evolved formally and thematically, including a shift from oil painting to watercolors for health reasons. She gained recognition for that work (and her drawings) alongside area painters such as Carolyn Brady Epton and Phyllis Plattner. Perhaps more significantly, the qualities of that medium influenced her printmaking palette toward subtler, secondary and intermediate colors. Her work also became more complex in composition and space, using pattern, texture, and devices such as printed or collaged frames within the picture plane (e.g., Seven Lemons, 1976) to create contrasts between flatness and depth, and realism and imagination. In subject matter, she turned from the metaphorical to more neutrally handled imagery drawn from her immediate environment—initially domestic still lifes and scenes, and later, portraits of her husband, self, friends and colleagues—that gradually revealed minute details and motifs of a personal nature.

Pots and Plants (1973) was a pivotal work in this vein, relying on color to structure and tie the print together rather than black line. It is also notable for its mix of actual textile patterns and inventive, reflected patterns on the pot surfaces picked up from surrounding objects. In watercolors such as Fantasy with Three Goblets (1973), she took a similar approach, exploiting the translucency and decoration of flattened man-made and natural forms. Reviewing Walters's 1978 solo exhibition at Maryville College, New Art Examiner critic Carol Starbuck noted the technical skill, soft line and minimal woodgrain of her woodcuts, while comparing the decorative mix of patterning and flat and three-dimensional space in works like Five Tomatoes (1975) to Japanese printmaking and the work of Matisse.

In the latter 1970s and 1980s, Walters returned to portraits, continuing to develop her woodcut technique. St. Louis critic Michael G. Rubin noted the print Original Smith (1978) as demonstrating a new sense of color harmony in its mix of transparent yellows, rusts, red and purple; Portrait with White Hat (1977) and Patience II (1979) showcased her diverse methods—halftone engravings on faces and hands, striations and undulating carvings, old newspaper printing plates—of achieving refined textural variations among print areas. Reviews noted later portraits for their relatable directness (e.g., Red Blouse, 1981; Claudia R., 1984) amid technical complexity and near-photorealist in execution.

Sylvia Solochek Walters, Women's Work is Never Done, woodcut, 14" x 27", 2008.

Walters's later printmaking explores personal narratives involving rites of passage, loss, ritual, aging and healing, and animal and environmental issues. It often incorporates multiple images and motifs from nature, culture, family albums and art historical sources, such as Chinese pottery (e.g., La Grande Cascade, 1983) or Japanese prints. She frequently subdivides picture planes into sections with specific patterns or colors, overlaid with expressively drawn elements suggesting snapshots and memories (e.g., Fathers and Sons, 1997). Becky's Babies (2004) tells a metaphorical story using narrative panels inspired by family anecdotes and Hebrew illuminated manuscripts; Dearest Daughter (Lost Lessons) (2014) appears to depict a diary page and letter fragment along with woodcut images of animals, Hokusai's "Wave" and a father and daughter. In other works, (e.g., Women's Work Is Never Done, 2008; The Road Is Closed, 2009; She Alights on Her Roost, 2020), Walters uses personal symbols to offer decorative and ironic takes on the uneasy relationships between humanity and work, nature, or imagery.

== Collections and recognition ==
Walters's work belongs to museum collections including the Fine Arts Museums of San Francisco, New York Public Library, Library of Congress, St. Louis Art Museum, Chazen Museum of Art, de Saisset Museum, Magnes Collection of Jewish Art and Life, Milwaukee Art Museum, Oakland Museum of California, and YIVO Archives, and numerous corporate and university collections.

She has received awards from the Southern Graphics Council International (Tradition in Printmaking, 2014), Northern California Print Competition (1986, Best of Show), Colorprint USA and Vermillion '79 (both 1979), and St. Louis Artists' Guild (1969, 1971, 1975), among others. She was awarded two grants from the National Endowment for the Arts in conjunction with her work in the Women's Caucus for Art. In 1974, she received an Association of American University Presses book design award for Something About Swans by Madeline Doran. She also assistant-edited (to Maryly Snow) California Society of Printmakers: One Hundred Years 1913–2013, which won an Art Libraries Society of North America award.
