= Sylvia Fein =

American surrealist painter and author (1919–2024)

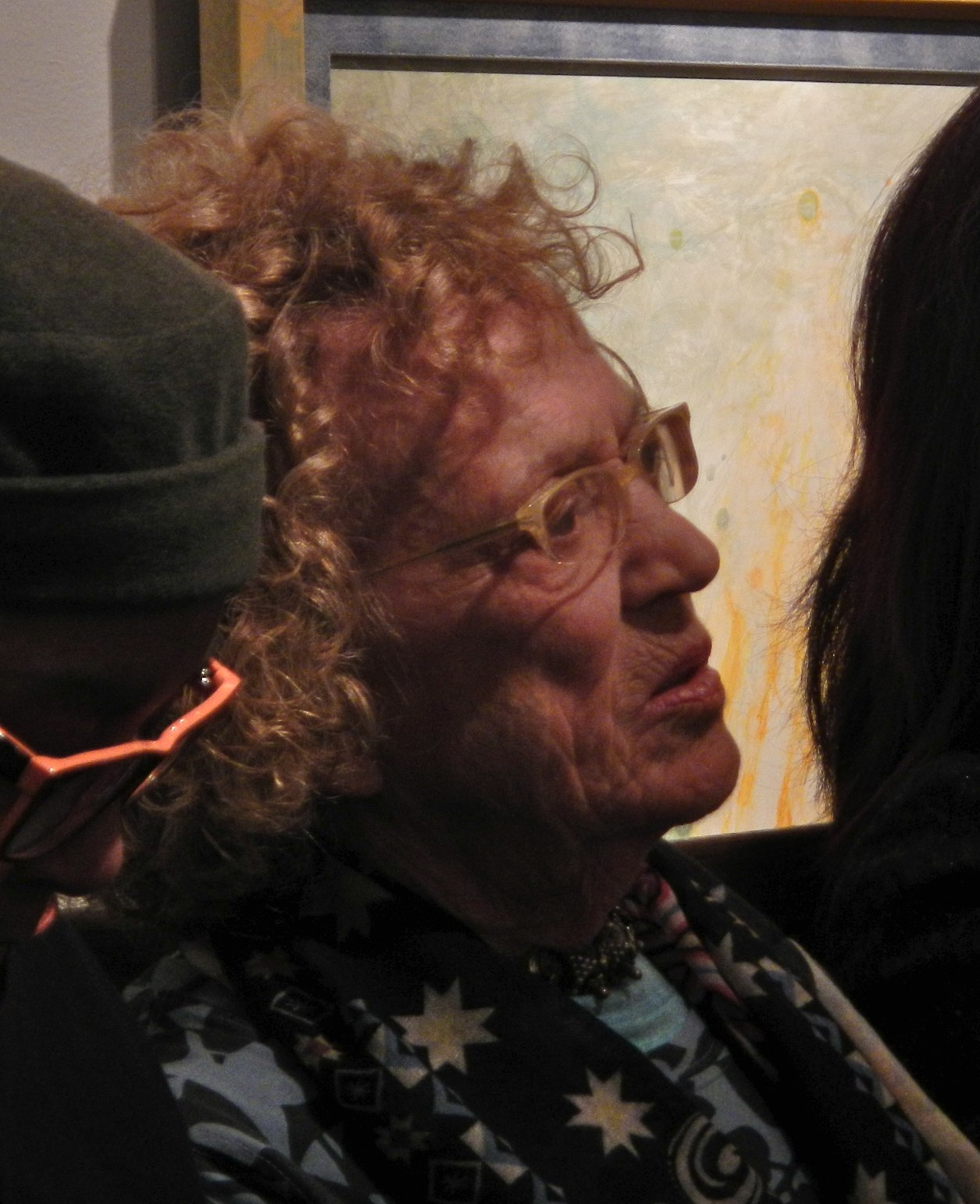
- Born: November 20, 1919; Milwaukee, Wisconsin, U.S.
- Died: April 1, 2024 (aged 104); California, U.S.
- Education: University of California, Berkeley
- Known for: Egg tempera paintings, books
- Style: Surrealism, magic realism
- Spouse: William Scheuber (m. 1942; died 2013)
- Website: http://www.sylviafeinpainter.net/

Sylvia Fein (November 20, 1919 – April 1, 2024) was an American surrealist painter and author. Inspired by the quattrocento, Fein painted in egg tempera, which she made herself. She studied painting at the University of Wisconsin–Madison, where she became part of a group of magical realist painters, including Gertrude Abercrombie, Marshall Glasier, John Wilde, Dudley Huppler, and Karl Priebe. A newspaper described her as "Wisconsin’s Foremost Woman Painter." Beginning in the 1940s, Fein lived for a time in Mexico, then in the San Francisco Bay Area of California, eventually settling in the town of Martinez. Her 100th birthday was marked with an exhibition at her alma mater, The University of California at Berkeley.

== Early life and education ==
Fein was born on November 20, 1919, in Milwaukee, Wisconsin, and was the second of three children. Her parents were Alfred Fein, an attorney, and Elizabeth Fein, a pianist. During her youth, Fein described herself as being a quiet child, and stated in an interview that while in school, "I was always considered dumb. Artistic ability when I was growing up was not a great thing anybody was looking for. They were looking for scholastic ability ... and I didn't talk a lot, but that was not recognized, it was just put down that you weren't too smart academically." After graduating from high school, Fein hoped to attend college, but the family could not afford to send her to college. As a result, Fein spent a year working to raise the money needed to attend college. It was during this time that she was introduced to William "Bill" Scheuber (1918–2013), her future husband. Soon after, Fein enrolled at the University of Wisconsin-Madison, where Scheuber was also enrolled.

Though initially wanting to enroll in the Art program, Fein would later recall her sister saying to her, "Yes, but you'd never get a job when you got out of college, so you should enter the home ec[onomics] school and at least then you could become a teacher." The following year, however, Fein changed majors and began to study painting. While completing her program, she was introduced to John Wilde, Gertrude Abercrombie, Marshall Glasier, Dudley Huppler, and Karl Priebe, all of whom would later be referred to as the "surrealists of the Midwest." On May 30, 1942, Fein and Scheuber were married, shortly before Scheuber joined the United States military and left to fight in World War II.

== Life in Mexico ==
In 1943, Fein moved to Mexico after her husband was away on military service so she could recuperate from pneumonia. She planned to visit her mother in Mexico City, but Fein was convinced by a classmate to travel to Ajijic on the shores of Lake Chapala, where she lived and painted for three years. Even 60 years later, Fein says that since her time in Mexico in 1943, she has "loved Mexico and could cry on the return because I have the dust of Mexico on my heart." During her time in Mexico, Fein was part of group exhibitions at the Villa Montecarlo, and she completed paintings for her first solo exhibition at the Perls Galleries in New York City. Along with painting, Fein helped rebuild the adobe house in which she had her studio, taught English to young people, and started an embroidered blouse industry for women. She also provided paper, pencils, and crayons to children in exchange for exotic insects.

== Return to the United States ==
When her husband returned from the war, the couple lived in Mexico City for a little bit and then drove back to the U.S. with Fein's paintings in the back seat. Fein's first solo exhibition was a great success and received praise in The New Yorker. In the 1946-47 Whitney Annual exhibition, Fein's work was shown alongside that of Max Ernst, Roberto Matta, and Jackson Pollock. Upon returning to the United States, Fein and Scheuber moved to East Oakland, California. By that time, Fein and Scheuber had purchased a boat and began to go boating in the California Delta region. These boat trips gave her inspiration to begin work on her landscapes and seascapes of California. She completed her MFA at the University of California, Berkeley in 1951.

== Writing career ==
In the late 1970s, Fein took a break from painting and wrote two books. The first book, Heidi's Horse, offers an analysis of the development of her daughter, Heidi Scheuber. The book chronicles Heidi's drawings throughout her childhood, from the ages of two to fifteen. Her second book, First Drawings: Genesis of Visual Thinking, is about the basic patterns that appear throughout human art, both historically and during childhood development. Fein's hope with First Drawings was to showcase the relationship between the art done by children and the cave paintings of the Paleolithic period.

== Return to painting ==
Fein began painting again in the early 2000s, and she exhibited a selection of both her recent and earlier work in 2014. Shortly after returning to painting, Fein began to work on her “Eye” series, which often exhibited elements of paintings she had done decades earlier. The series currently consists of twenty-one paintings. Fein would later describe her “Eye” series as both a "fun and thrilling experience." Fein also returned to painting landscapes of California, a continuation of earlier work she had done between 1955 and 1975.

After the death of her husband in 2013, Fein began work on her “Tree” series as a memorial to her husband, whom Fein credited as having always supported her career. The series consists of five paintings, the first of which symbolizes her husband. The next piece in the series was meant to represent both Fein and Scheuber, while the third piece represented Fein herself. A fourth piece symbolized both Fein and Scheuber again. Fein enjoyed being near nature, which inspired many of her works. She later resided in Martinez, California. Fein died in California on April 1, 2024, at the age of 104.

== Exhibitions ==
Fein's solo exhibitions include:

- 1946 – Perls Galleries, New York, NY
- 1957 – "Fifty-seven Small Paintings of the San Francisco Bay Region," Feingarten Galleries, San Francisco, California
- 1958 – Sagittarius Gallery, New York, NY, Lane Galleries, Los Angeles, California
- 1959 – Feingarten Galleries, San Francisco, California
- 1960 – Saint Mary's College, Moraga, California. Kunstkabinett, Frankfurt, Germany
- 1961 – Feingarten Galleries, New York, NY
- 1962 – Mills College Art Gallery, Oakland, California. Ruthermore Galleries, Oakland, California
- 1963 – Maxwell Art Galleries, San Francisco, California
- 1965 – "Shape of the Sea," Nicole Gallery, Berkeley, California
- 1966 – Bresler Galleries, Milwaukee, Wisconsin, Setay Gallery, Beverly Hills, California
- 1967 – Oshkosh Public Museum, Oshkosh, Wisconsin
- 2007 – "Wondrous Life: Paintings and Drawings," Bakersfield Art Museum, Bakersfield California
- 2014 – "Sylvia Fein: Surreal Nature," Krowswork, Oakland, California
- 2019 – Berkeley Art Museum and Pacific Film Archive (BAMPFA), Berkeley, California

Fein's group exhibitions include:

- 1941 – 13th Annual Exhibition of Student Art, University of Wisconsin, Elizabeth Waters Purchase Prize. 8th Annual Wisconsin Salon of Art, Joseph E. Davies Purchase Prize
- 1942 – 9th Annual Wisconsin Salon of Art, Purchase Prize for Ladies with Many Faces, Chazen Museum of Art Collection. 1st Annual Racine and Vicinity Show, Wustum Museum, Wisconsin. 14th Annual Exhibition of Student Art, University of Wisconsin, 1st Prize for Lady in a Landscape with Animals. Sylvia Fein and John Wilde Exhibition, Memorial Union, University of Wisconsin. 29th Annual Exhibition of Wisconsin Art, Milwaukee Art Institute, Honorable Mention
- 1943 – 30th Annual Exhibition of Wisconsin Art, Milwaukee Art Institute. 47th Annual Exhibition of Artists of Chicago and Vicinity, Illinois. 22nd International Exhibition of Watercolors, Art Institute of Chicago, Illinois. Perls Galleries, New York, New York
- 1944 – University of Utah group show from Perls Galleries. 48th Annual Exhibition of Artists of Chicago and Vicinity, Illinois. Springfield Museum of Art Annual, Massachusetts. State University of Iowa group show from Perls Galleries. Whitney Museum of American Painting, Annual Exhibition of Contemporary American Painting, New York, New York. 4th Biennial Exhibition of Contemporary American Painting, Richmond, Virginia. Villa Montecarlo, Chapala, Mexico
- 1945 – Whitney Museum of American Art, Annual Exhibition of Contemporary American Sculpture, Watercolors & Drawings, New York, New York
- 1946 – Whitney Museum of American Art, Annual Exhibition of Contemporary American Painting, New York, New York. Paintings of the Year 3rd Annual, National Academy of Design, New York, New York
- 1947 – 57th Annual Exhibition of Contemporary Art, Sheldon Memorial Gallery, Nebraska. 34th Annual of Contemporary American Painting, Toledo Museum of Art, Ohio
- 1948 – Wisconsin State Centennial Exhibition of Contemporary Wisconsin Art, Layton Art Gallery, Milwaukee, Wisconsin
- 1949 – San Francisco Museum of Art Drawing and Print Exhibition, California
- 1959 – Young Collectors Showing, Dallas Museum of Art, Texas
- 1960 – 5th Annual Diablo Pageant of Arts, Walnut Creek, California
- 1961 – "Brotherhood of Man" (Alfred E. Strelsin Invitational), Jewish Community Center, Milwaukee, Wisconsin
- 1964 – Art Bank, Art Association of the San Francisco Art Institute, California. "Three Painters," St. Mary's College, Moraga, California. San Francisco Legion of Honor Winter Invitational
- 1965 – "Art of the Landscape," San Francisco Art Institute, California
- 1968 – "Magic and Fantastic Art," Walnut Creek, California, Napa Valley 3rd Annual Wine Festival
- 2005 – "With Friends: Six Magic Realists 1940-1965," Chazen Museum of Art, Madison, Wisconsin
- 2016 – "Bats, Babes & Broccoli – Wisconsin Magic Realists," Mongerson Gallery, Chicago, Illinois

== Books ==
- Heidi's Horse (Exelrod Press, 1976) -- illustrated by Heidi Scheuber
- First Drawings: Genesis of Visual Thinking (Exelrod Press, 1993)
