= Frances Myers (artist) =

American printmaker

- Myers in 1988
- Born: Frances Julia Myers; April 16, 1936; Racine, Wisconsin, U.S.
- Died: December 17, 2014 (aged 78); Madison, Wisconsin, U.S.
- Education: University of Wisconsin–Madison
- Known for: Printmaking

Frances Julia Myers (April 16, 1936 – December 17, 2014) was an American printmaker.

== Personal life ==
Myers was born on April 16, 1936, in Racine, Wisconsin. She began her studies at the San Francisco Art Institute, but soon transferred to the University of Wisconsin–Madison where she earned a BS in 1962, and an MFA in 1965.

While teaching at UW-Madison, Myers lived and worked on a farm in Hollandale, Wisconsin, with her husband and fellow printmaker Warrington Colescott.

Myers died on December 17, 2014, in Madison, Wisconsin.

== Career ==
Frances Myers employed a variety of printmaking techniques in her career including "relief, photo-etching, and mixed media processes."

Myers is best known for her prints depicting various buildings. She once said, “I don’t want to invent a building, I want to bring new life to a building.” Growing up in Racine, Myers was exposed to many of Frank Lloyd Wright's architectural works, and she paid tribute to this in her 1980 work The Frank Lloyd Wright Print Portfolio: Aquatints by Frances Myers. The portfolio included six print of different Wright designed buildings such as Wingspread and the Guggenheim Museum.

She taught at the University of Wisconsin-Madison for 20 years, from 1988 to 2008, working her way up from Assistant Professor to head of the Graphics Department.

Myers earned several awards, including two National Endowment for the Arts National Fellowships, an H.I. Romnes Faculty Fellowship and a Kellett Mid-Career Award from UW-Madison, and was a fellow of the National Academy of Design in New York.

In 2016, the Madison Museum of Contemporary Art presented a posthumous retrospective of her work. Her work is included in the collections of the Smithsonian American Art Museum, the Davidson Art Center, the Brooklyn Museum, in addition to several Wisconsin museums including the Racine Art Museum, Kenosha Public Museum, and the Milwaukee Art Museum.
