= Karl Priebe =

American painter

Karl J. Priebe
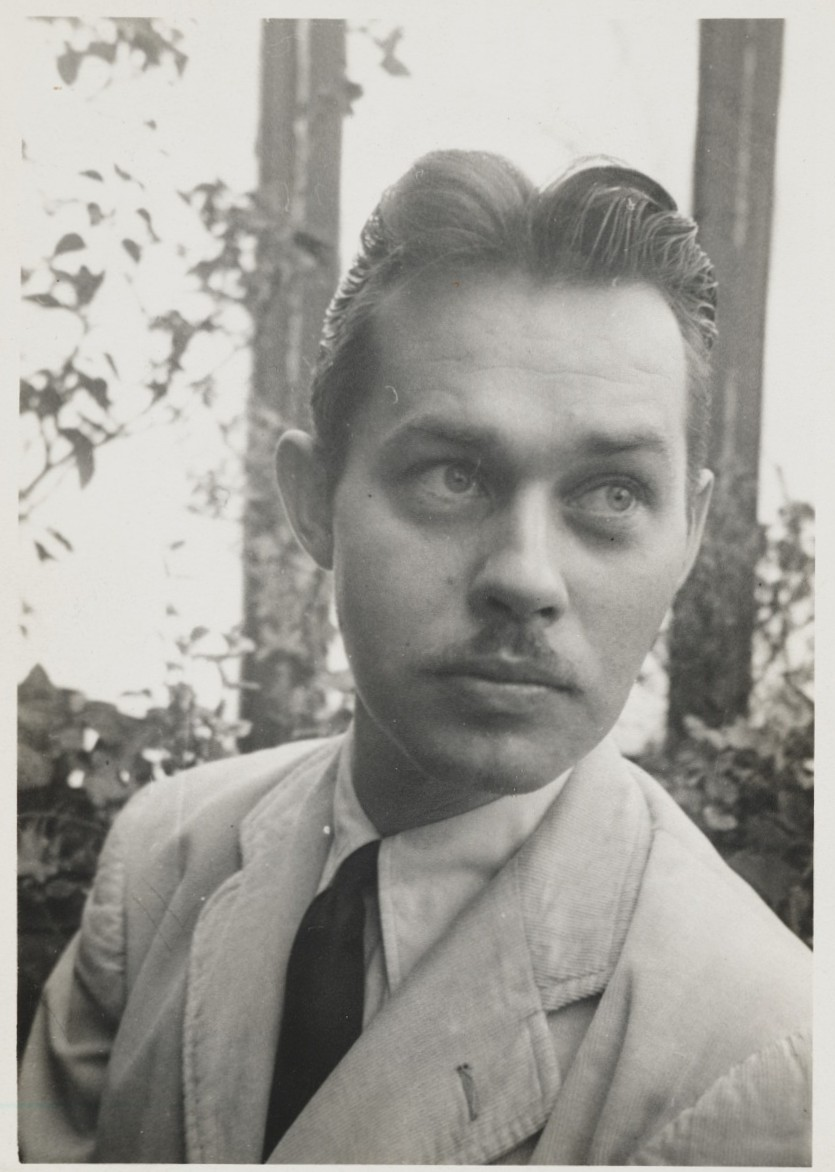
- Karl Priebe, c. 1950
- Born: July 1, 1914; Milwaukee, Wisconsin
- Died: July 6, 1976 (aged 62); Milwaukee, Wisconsin
- Education: Layton School of Art; School of the Art Institute of Chicago
- Known for: Painter
- Notable work: Madonna and Child
- Movement: Surrealism
- Awards: Prix de Rome: 1941

Karl Priebe (July 1, 1914 – July 6, 1976) was an American painter from Milwaukee, Wisconsin whose studies and paintings of birds, exotic animals, and African-American culture won him national and international recognition.

== Biography ==
Karl John Priebe was born in Milwaukee, Wisconsin, to Emil Priebe (1873–1949) and Catherine Wacker (1876–1955). He graduated from the Layton School of Art, where he studied under Gerrit V. Sinclair, before moving on to the School of the Art Institute of Chicago, which he graduated from in 1938.

In 1941, Priebe was awarded the Rome Prize for Visual Arts by the American Academy in Rome, though, because of the onset of WWII, he was unable to use the grant to study in Europe. Along with painters Gertrude Abercrombie, John Wilde, Marshall Glasier, Dudley Huppler, and Sylvia Fein, he made up a loose group of artists known as the Wisconsin Magic Realists.

After serving on the anthropology staff of the Milwaukee Public Museum (1938–42) and brieflty as director of the Kalamazoo Institute of the Arts (1943–44), Priebe moved to New York City, becoming one of the few Wisconsin artists of his generation whose paintings were shown at major public and private galleries, among them the Museum of Modern Art and Perls Galleries.

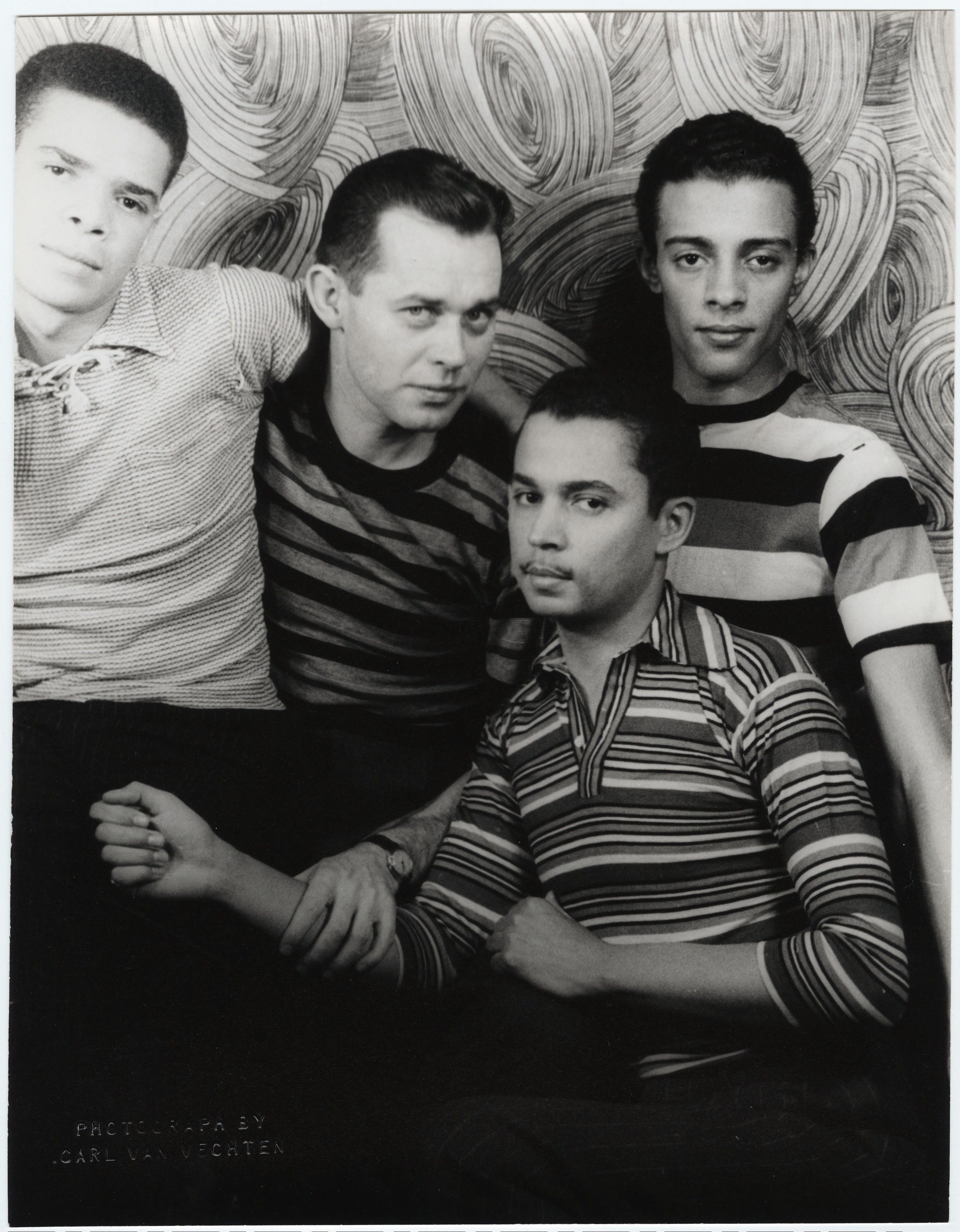
Priebe (second from left) with Frank Roy Harriott, Edward Atkinson, and Tom Kemp in January 1948, photographed by Carl Van Vechten

While in Manhattan, Priebe befriended many artists, including photographer Carl Van Vechten, with whom he maintained a long correspondence. Vechten sent a number of his photographs to Priebe, including after the latter's return to Milwaukee. Priebe's collection of photographs by Van Vechten eventually amounted to 4,000 items.

Priebe drew the inspiration for his works from numerous locations. After he became an instructor at the Layton School of Art, his paintings of exotic animals brought him further recognition and can be attributed to his numerous trips to the Milwaukee County Zoo.

He first became interested in African-American culture when, as an art student in Chicago, he taught a class in a settlement house largely attended by African Americans. His Black figures, he recalled later, were not intended as portraits, but were taken from his memories of people he saw in the settlement house. Throughout his creative life, Priebe was known for his love of Black culture. He was a longtime friend of jazz singers Billie Holiday and Pearl Bailey, writer Langston Hughes, painter Charles Sebree, and musician Dizzy Gillespie.

The last lifetime exhibition of Priebe's works took place at Marquette University in Milwaukee in February 1976, featuring over a hundred works.

== Personal life ==
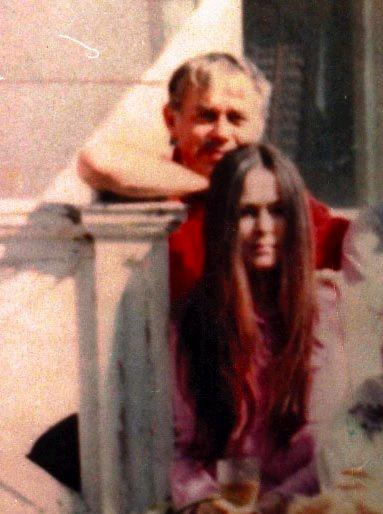
Karl Priebe with Nancy Berghaus in 1975

Priebe was gay. In 1944, Priebe had a brief romantic relationship with writer Owen Dodson.

Between 1945 and 1955, he shared his life with New York writer Frank Roy Harriott.

In his later years Priebe suffered from a number of ailments. In November 1975, he had one of his eyes surgically removed, and his health began to decline. He died of cancer on July 6, 1976. He was buried in Holy Cross Cemetery, Milwaukee.

== See also ==
- Marquette University Special Collections and University Archives
