= Friebert =

Friebert is a surname. Notable people with the surname include:

- Joseph Friebert (1724–1799), Austrian opera singer and composer
- Joseph Friebert (painter) (1908–2002), American painter and printmaker
