= Sturgeon Bay Post Office =

- U.S. National Register of Historic Places
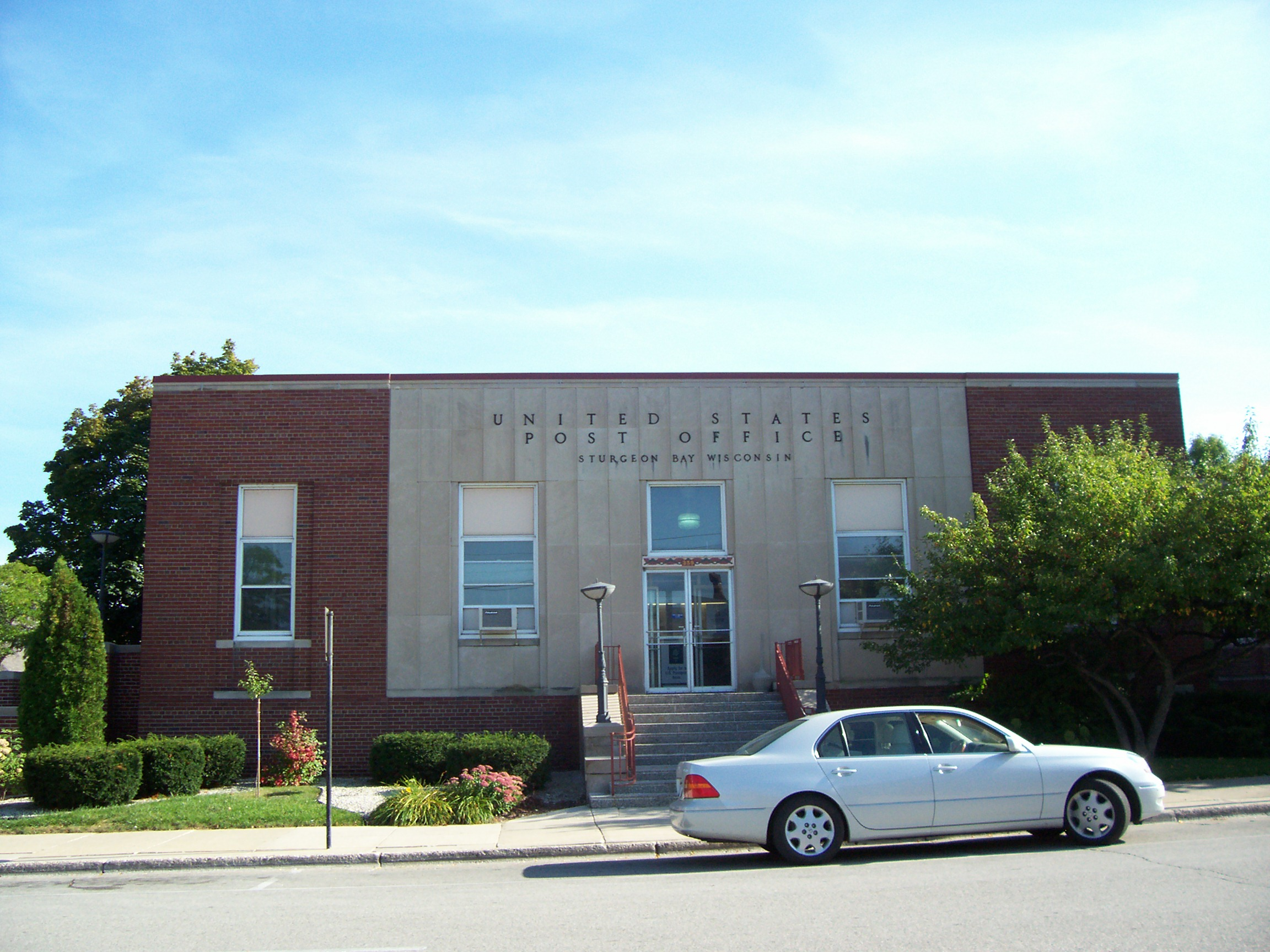

- Location within Wisconsin Location within the United States
- Location: 359 Louisiana Avenue; Sturgeon Bay, Wisconsin
- Coordinates: 44°50′07″N 87°22′33″W
- Built: 1937
- Architect: Santos Zingale and Louis A. Simon
- Architectural style: Moderne
- MPS: United States Post Office Construction in Wisconsin MPS
- NRHP reference No.: 00001237
- Added to NRHP: October 24, 2000

The Sturgeon Bay Post Office, located at 359 Louisiana Ave., is the main post office in Sturgeon Bay, Wisconsin, United States. The post office was built in 1937 and designed by Louis A. Simon in the Moderne style. The building is constructed in red brick; the front of the building surrounding the main entrance is faced in limestone, and the building also has limestone trim. The entrance is located atop a set of granite stairs with limestone sides; a pole lamp is located on each side of the stairs. A mural by Santos Zingale titled "Fruits of Sturgeon Bay", which was funded by the Treasury Section of Fine Arts, was painted in the post office's lobby in 1940.

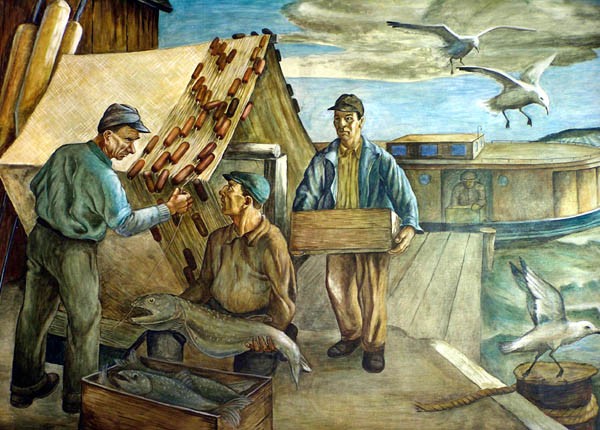
Fruits of Sturgeon Bay

The post office was listed on the National Register of Historic Places on October 24, 2000.
