= Frank Roy Harriott =

American writer and newspaper editor

- Born: March 20, 1922; New York, New York
- Died: September 7, 1955 (aged 33); Milwaukee, Wisconsin
- Occupations: Writer, editor
- Years active: 1945–1955

Frank Roy Harriott (March 20, 1922 – September 7, 1955) was an American writer and newspaper editor active in New York City and Milwaukee.

== Life and career ==
Frank Roy Harriott was born into an African American family of New York City on March 20, 1922. Graduating from the City College of New York, he became a writer for the short-lived newspaper PM.

In 1945, jazz singer Billie Holiday introduced Harriott to one of her friends, the Milwaukee painter Karl Priebe, who was working in Manhattan at the time. The two men began a romantic relationship and Harriott eventually relocated to Wisconsin with Priebe. The couple moved into an apartment on Prospect Avenue, in the East Side neighborhood of Milwaukee, while also sharing a residence in Evansville. In 1947, Harriott obtained a Rosenwald Fellowship to write a novel loosely based on Holiday’s life and career.

Upon relocating to the Midwest, Harriott was tapped by Chicago businessman John H. Johnson to be associate editor of his newest publication, Ebony. In parallel, he authored articles for other publications, including The Negro Digest and Mademoiselle.

In 1951, Harriott was diagnosed with Addison's disease. Despite years of treatment, he died from complications of this condition on September 7, 1955. He was buried in Evergreen Cemetery (now Glen Oaks Cemetery) in Glendale, with all funeral expenses paid for by Priebe.

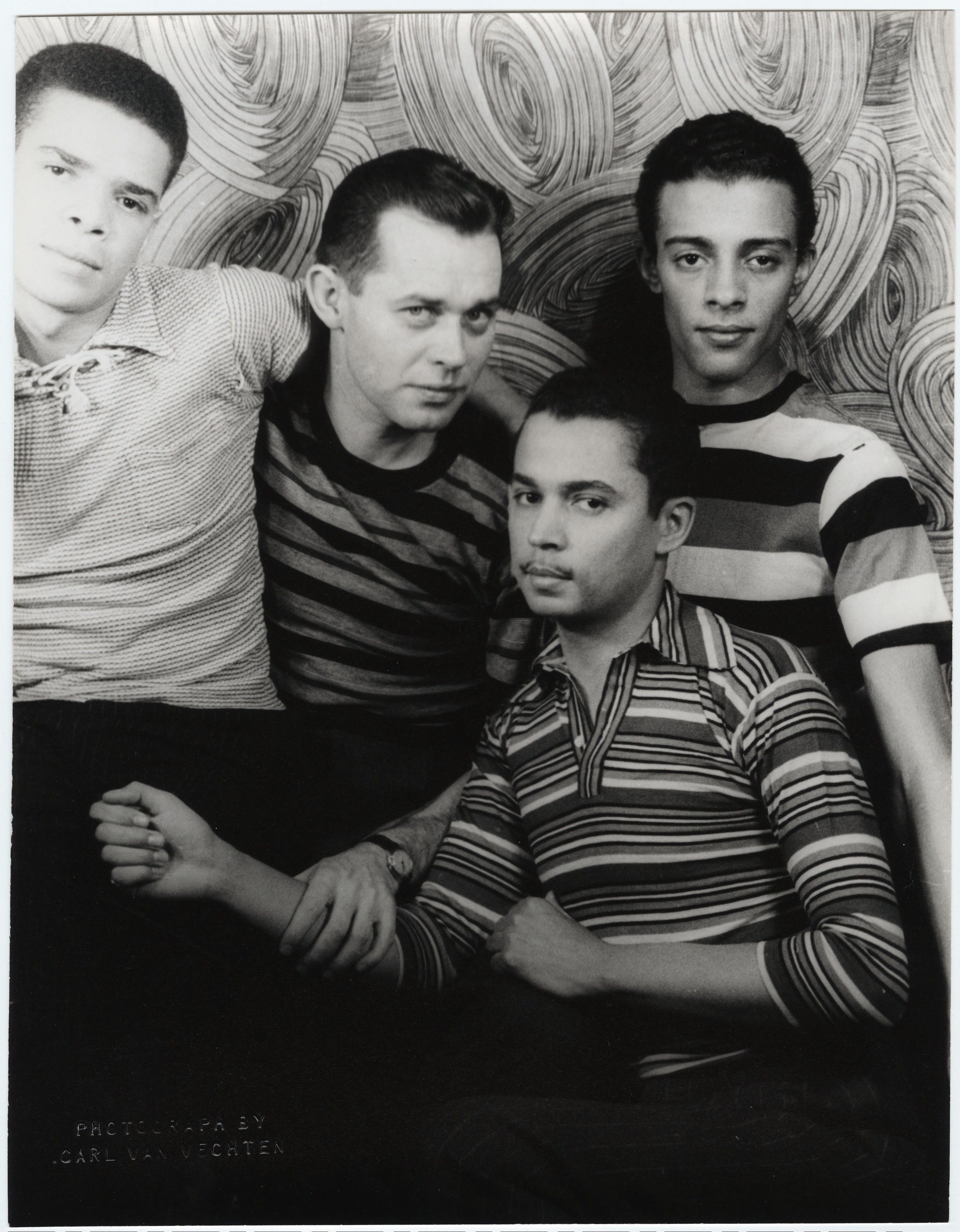
Harriott (left) with Priebe, Edward Atkinson, and Tom Kemp, photographed by Carl Van Vechten in January 1948

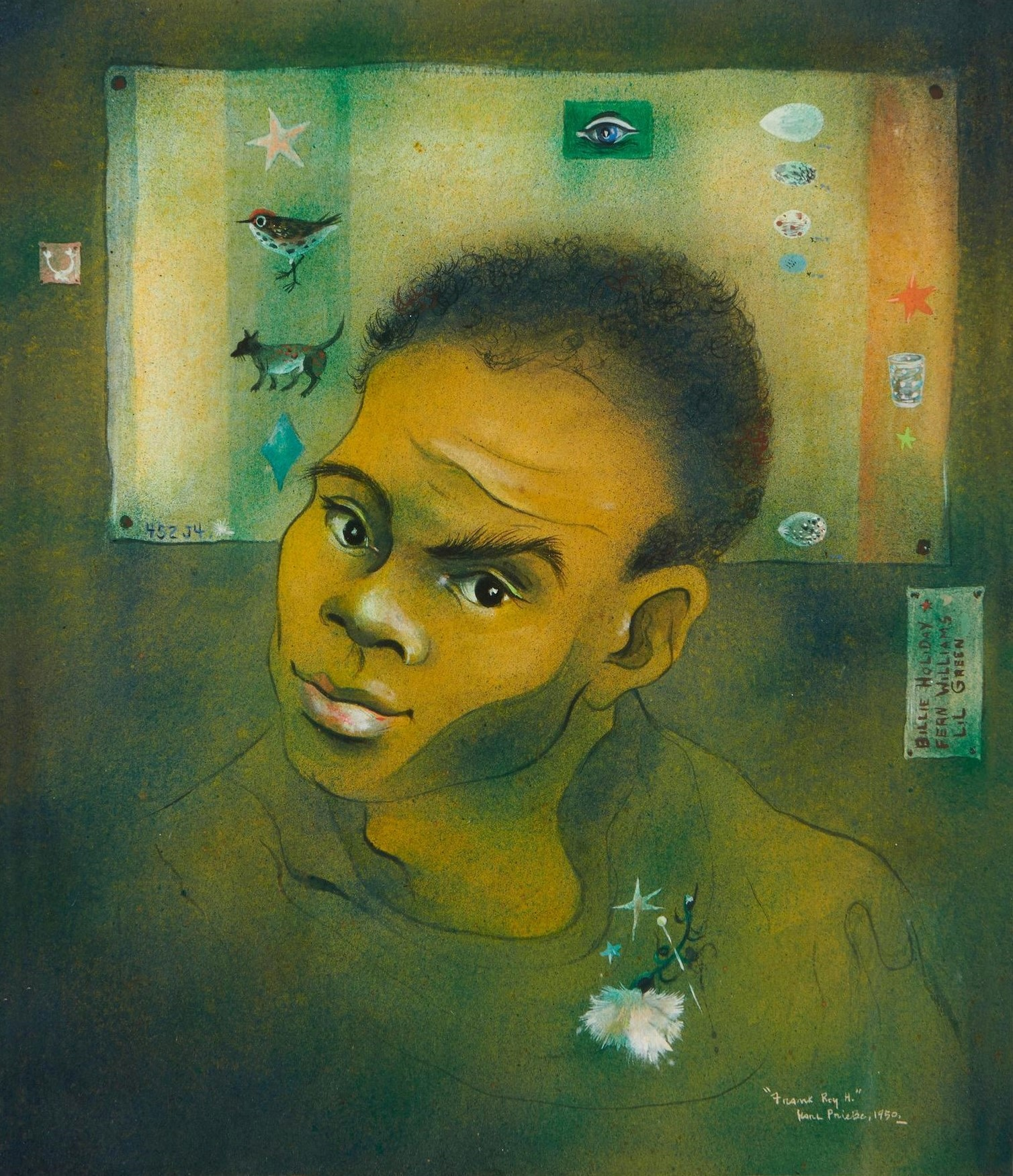
Karl Priebe, Portrait of Frank Roy Harriott, 1950
