= Joseph Friebert (painter) =

American painter and printmaker (1908–2002)

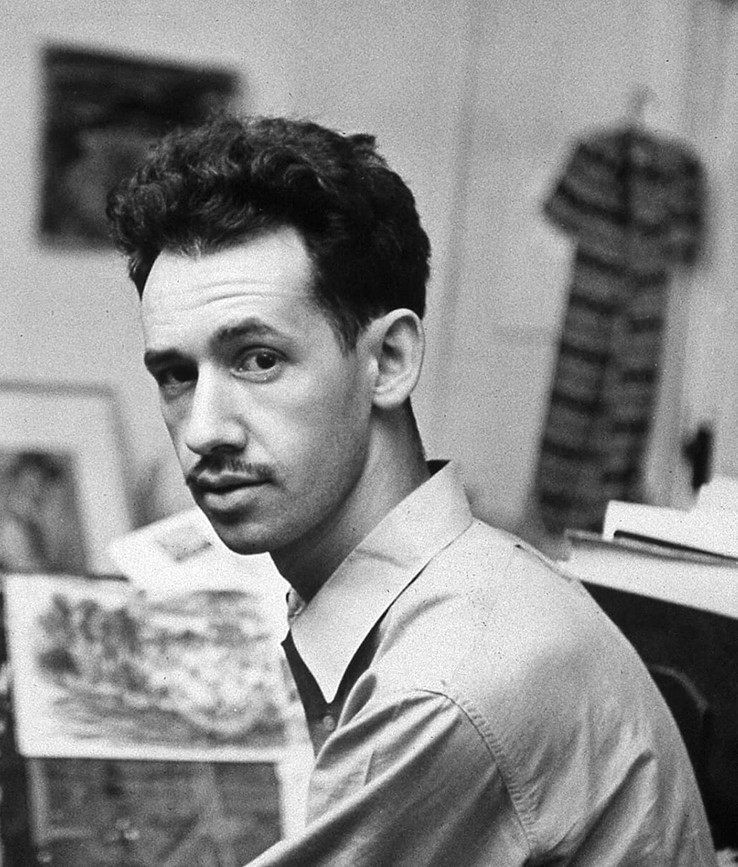
- Friebert in his studio, 1940
- Born: May 11, 1908; Buffalo, New York
- Died: December 16, 2002 (aged 94); Milwaukee, Wisconsin
- Resting place: Spring Hill Cemetery and Mausoleum, Milwaukee, Wisconsin
- Education: Marquette University; Layton School of Art; University of Wisconsin–Madison
- Style: Social Realism; Abstraction

Joseph Friebert (May 11, 1908 – December 16, 2002) was an American painter and printmaker in Milwaukee, Wisconsin.

Much of Friebert's work, from the Social Realist style of his early period to the figurative approach of his later years, tackles class, race, and labor struggles, as well as the evolution of Milwaukee throughout the Great Depression and postwar years. In the 1950s, Friebert turned to semiabstraction, focused on urban structures and landscapes, and one of his paintings was included in the American pavilion of the 1956 Venice Biennale. He taught at the University of Wisconsin–Milwaukee from 1946 to 1976.

In 2015 the Wisconsin-based Kohler Foundation distributed 280 paintings by Friebert to art museums nationwide in an attempt to increase his representation in public collections. Among institutions that received works were the Art Institute of Chicago, Detroit Institute of Arts, Nelson-Atkins Museum of Art, and Philadelphia Museum of Art. He is currently represented in 47 American museums.

== Life and work ==
Joseph Friebert was born on May 11, 1908, in Buffalo, New York, the fourth child of a tailor and labor organizer Edward Friebert (1875–1960), who was born in Budapest, and Hermine Hahn (1876–1954), who was born in present-day Slovakia. They had met in the sweatshops of New York City. In 1911 the family relocated to Milwaukee, where Edward became active in the Socialist movement. This would later influence his son’s education and art.

After graduating from North Division High School in 1926 and obtaining a pharmaceutical degree from Marquette University, Friebert was employed by several drugstores in town. Working part-time during the Depression, he found time to return to drawing, which he had enjoyed in his youth. He was encouraged to study at the Milwaukee Businessmen's Sketch Club and eventually met several upcoming artists, including Alfred Sessler, Ruth Grotenrath, Schomer Lichtner, and Santos Zingale. In 1936 he enrolled in the Layton School of Art, where he studied under painter Gerrit V. Sinclair, before transferring to Milwaukee State Teachers College, where he was mentored by painter and graphic artist Robert Von Neumann. Friebert’s wife, Betsy Ritz (1910–1963), whom he married in 1937, was also a visual artist.

In 1946, a year after obtaining his degree in art education and teaching briefly at the Layton School of Art, Friebert left pharmacy for good to join the faculty of Milwaukee State Teachers College. Friebert obtained a Master’s degree from the University of Wisconsin–Madison and spent the academic year 1951–52 on a Ford Foundation Fellowship in New York City, studying at Columbia University and at the Art Students League, where he worked with Yasuo Kuniyoshi. One of Friebert's students at UW–Milwaukee was muralist Richard Haas, who graduated with a Bachelor's degree in art in 1959.

In the same decade, Friebert turned toward abstraction, eventually mentoring fellow Wisconsin painter Fred Berman. He was included in national juried shows at the Metropolitan Museum of Art and the Whitney Museum of American Art, along with the Art Institute of Chicago, Pennsylvania Academy of the Fine Arts, Carnegie Museum of Art, and Walker Art Center. He caught the attention of Art Institute of Chicago curator Katharine Kuh, who selected his painting Urban Cathedral for the 1956 Venice Biennale. which she organized. It was the only work to be sold out of the American Pavilion that year. While he spent well over a decade doing semiabstractions, he never entirely stopped painting figuratively. In the mid-1960s, Friebert returned exclusively to figuration, focusing on industrial, urban, and rural landscapes, as well as figures in interiors and landscapes. In addition to working in oil, he produced watercolors, gouaches, lithographs, and monotypes.

Retrospective exhibitions of Friebert’s art during his lifetime include ones organized by the University of Wisconsin–Milwaukee in 1977, the Milwaukee Art Museum in 1989, and the Haggerty Museum of Art in 1998. He died on December 16, 2002, in Milwaukee.

== Museum collections ==
In great part thanks to gifts from his family and the Kohler Foundation, works by Friebert are found in 47 museums across the United States.

Friebert was well-represented in the art collection of Friebert’s brother-in-law, Maurice Ritz (1911–1977), and his wife, Esther Leah Medalie (1918–2003). His works were included in exhibitions of the collection and in the couple's eventual bequest of nearly 300 European and American works to the Milwaukee Art Museum in 2004. As of 2025, the museum is home to seven works by Friebert, as well as prints and drawings by his wife, Betsy, and younger daughter, Judith (born 1945).

In 2018 the Museum of Wisconsin Art in West Bend organized a retrospective exhibition of Friebert’s art after a donation of 67 paintings, drawings, and prints from the Friebert family and the Kohler Foundation made the institution the largest repository of his oeuvre. The Chazen Museum of Art in Madison holds 20 works by Friebert, including a 1942 self-portrait. In the summer of 2023, the Miller Art Museum, in Sturgeon Bay, Wisconsin, organized an exhibition of views of Door County, Wisconsin, by Friebert and Ritz. That fall, Madron Gallery, in Chicago, displayed Friebert's semiabstract work from the 1950s and early 1960s.

== Bibliography ==
- Carter, Curtis (1998). Joseph Friebert at Ninety. Milwaukee, WI: Haggerty Museum of Art, Marquette University. ISBN 978-0945366058.
- Corbett, John (2006). Joseph Friebert, Fred Berman, and the Milwaukee Scene, 1935–1965. Chicago: Corbett vs. Dempsey.
- Friebert Rossen, Susan (2018). Joseph Friebert: A Life in Art. West Bend, WI: Museum of Wisconsin Art. ISBN 978-0999438817.
