= Warrington Colescott =

American artist (1921-2018)

- Born: Warrington Wickham Colescott Jr. March 7, 1921; Oakland, California, U.S.
- Died: September 10, 2018 (aged 97); Hollandale, Wisconsin, U.S.
- Education: University of California, Berkeley
- Occupation: Artist
- Spouses: Vera Sedloff (divorced) Ellen Moore Moore (divorced): Frances Myers
- Children: 3

Warrington Wickham Colescott Jr. (March 7, 1921 – September 10, 2018) was an American artist, he is best known for his satirical etchings. He was a master printmaker and operated Mantegna Press in Hollandale, Wisconsin, with his wife and fellow artist Frances Myers. Colescott died on 10 September 2018, at the age of 97.

== Early life and influences ==
Colescott was born in Oakland, California, in 1921 to parents of Louisiana Creole descent. His brother, artist Robert Colescott, was born in 1925. Creole culture—which the artist described as "a rich tradition of cuisine and music, of skeptical judgments, of irony and humor in expression" —played a large role in family life. Both food and music were key components of his upbringing. Comic strips were also important to the young Colescott, especially the work of Jay "Ding" Darling; the caricatural and narrative components would greatly influence his mature work. As a teenager, Colescott discovered vaudeville and the burlesque at the Red Mill/Moulin Rouge theater on 8th Street in Oakland. The broad humor and slapstick, as well as the eroticism of the burlesque performances, would inform his art and humor throughout his career.

== Education ==
Colescott earned his undergraduate degree at the University of California, Berkeley, graduating in the summer of 1942. At Berkeley, he majored in fine art, and was active with the university humor magazine, the Pelican, as well as the university newspaper, The Daily Californian, submitting cartoons and writing for both publications. He served in the army in World War II from 1942 to 1946, then returned to Berkeley to take a master's degree in fine arts and to earn a teaching certificate. Colescott taught art at Long Beach City College from 1947 to 1949. In September 1949, he began his career at the University of Wisconsin–Madison, where he taught for 37 years, retiring in 1986. During those years, Colescott continued his education in Europe, first on the GI Bill to study at the Académie de la Grande Chaumière, Paris, in 1952–53 and again on several fellowships and awards: in 1956–57, he was a Fulbright Fellow at the Slade School of Fine Art, University of London, and in 1963, he returned to London on a Guggenheim Fellowship.

== Mature work ==
Colescott had studied painting at the University of California, Berkeley, and only began to make screenprints in 1948 while he was teaching at Long Beach City College. He continued to paint, draw, and make screenprints when he moved to Madison to teach drawing and design at the University of Wisconsin. The art faculty at Madison included several members who were both painters and printmakers, including Dean Meeker, Alfred Sessler, and John Wilde. Sessler introduced Colescott to etching in the mid-1950s, and Colescott furthered his education in the medium at the Slade School of Fine Art in London, studying with Anthony Gross. During that time, Colescott experimented with hard-ground etching while continuing his screenprinting; in a few instances, he combined the two media, as in Night Wings from 1957.

By the early 1960s, Colescott had all but abandoned screenprinting, devoting his time, rather, to complex etchings in color. He achieved a major breakthrough in his work when he began to cut and shape the copper etching plates with mechanics' shears. In addition, he started incorporating bits of letterpress (typically zinc letterpress used for newspaper printing) and recycled etching plates into his compositions. At the same time, his work became less abstract and more narrative in nature, which allowed him to unleash his satirical talents in work such as In Birmingham Jail (1963), which is based on the civil rights struggles in the South, and lambastes the racism and violence of a corrupt system; or Christmas with Ziggy (1964), a social satire of businessmen entertaining their mistresses at a posh London restaurant. That same year, Colescott began an etching about the Depression-era gangster, John Dillinger, which grew into a suite of images mixing fact and fiction about the farm boy-turned-outlaw who mesmerized the public in the 1930s. "A storyteller who skips all the dull parts," as author and curator Gene Baro has called him, Colescott had no compunction about enhancing the narratives with imagined details and anachronistic additions.

Colescott's mature style found fruition in his series Prime-Time Histories: Colescott's USA (1972–73) followed by The History of Printmaking (1975–78), perhaps Colescott's best-known work. In this suite of images, which includes twenty-one intaglio prints, two lithographs, and a handful of watercolors and drawings, Colescott imagines critical moments in the history of printmaking. In each print, Colescott starts with historical fact, and then adds his own interpretation, often borrowing from the featured artist's own style or themes. For instance, in one scene we witness Alois Senefelder, the inventor of lithography, receiving the secrets of this medium from devilish creatures in the Black Forest; in another plate, Colescott imagines Pablo Picasso at the zoo, admiring animals such as the minotaur that recurs in his work. For his riff on Henri de Toulouse-Lautrec, Colescott imagines the fin-de-siècle artist (and enthusiastic chef) in his kitchen, whipping up a lunch for his friends, characters from Lautrec's oeuvre. In 1992, he returned again to an art-historical theme in My German Trip, in which Colescott imagines encounters with the great German printmakers Albrecht Dürer, Käthe Kollwitz, Otto Dix, George Grosz, and members of the German Expressionists, with highly comic results.

More satires and fictional histories have followed. Since the 1970s, Colescott has continued to pursue social satire in his work. As art historian Richard Cox has written, Colescott casts his net wide: "Greed vanity, pride, lust, social ambition, silly fads, and fashions—[Colescott] adapted the traditional targets of artists and writers as his own. With wit and disarming humor he has drawn many entertaining and zany prints, everything from good-natured spoofs to harsh, stinging parodies. Greek gods, American presidents, newspaper tycoons, academics, gangsters, cops, cowboys and Indians, Pilgrims, accountants, scientists, generals, joggers, hunters, show girls, movie stars, the artist himself—you name it, all have been skewered by Colescott's needle."

Recurrent themes since the late 1980s show a different focus. These include burlesque, popular culture, and the afterlife (see The Last Judgement triptych, 1987–88). The artist also focuses on some of his favorite locales, such as California (his birthplace), Wisconsin (where he resides), and New Orleans, the home of his Creole ancestors, as seen in his recent series, Suite Louisiana. Colescott has turned his attention to the conflicts in Iraq and Afghanistan in prints including Imperium: Royal Lancers Attack Wog Armor—Heartland Saved (2005) and Imperium: Down in the Green Zone (2006).

== Collections ==
Colescott's work is in museum collections across the United States and Europe, including the Art Institute of Chicago, Metropolitan Museum of Art, Whitney Museum of American Art, Museum of Modern Art, National Gallery of Art, New York Public Library, Victoria and Albert Museum, Tate, Columbus Museum of Art, and the Bibliothèque Nationale de France, among others. In his home state of Wisconsin, numerous institutions hold his work; these include the Chazen Museum of Art in Madison, the Madison Museum of Contemporary Art, the Museum of Wisconsin Art in West Bend, the Racine Art Museum, and the Milwaukee Art Museum, which has the largest collection of his work in the world, numbering more than 250 prints, drawings, and paintings.

== Exhibitions and publications ==
Colescott has exhibited in numerous group exhibitions and one-man shows. Among the most important are the exhibition A History of Printmaking originated by the Madison Art Center in 1979, which traveled to many subsequent venues; the retrospective at the Elvehjem Museum of Art (now known as the Chazen Museum of Art) at the University of Wisconsin–Madison in 1988–89, which was accompanied by the publication Warrington Colescott: Forty Years of Printmaking, A Retrospective, 1948–1988 and a retrospective at the Milwaukee Art Museum in 1995, which published a small catalogue Warrington Colescott. A major retrospective of Colescott's graphic oeuvre will be presented at the Milwaukee Art Museum June 10 – September 26, 2010. A full catalogue raisonné of Colescott's graphic works co-published by the Milwaukee Art Museum and the University of Wisconsin Press accompanies the exhibition. Read more about the catalogue or purchase it from the University of Wisconsin Press or the Milwaukee Art Museum Store.

== Critical reception ==
Colescott first gained critical notice in the 1950s, when he was included in the Young American Printmakers exhibition at the Museum of Modern Art, New York, in 1953, and in shows at the Whitney Museum of American Art in 1955 and 1956. He exhibited frequently throughout the subsequent decades and was honored with numerous grants, fellowships, and awards (see below). Critics liken Colescott's work to his contemporaries as well as historic antecedents; as art critic Mario Naves has summarized, "Mr. Colescott is not a satirist, cartoonist or Red Grooms, though he resembles each. (…) He's a mischievous humanist with a bottomless appreciation for the absurdities of life and…the afterlife. He's as many-sided and unsentimental as Twain, Hogarth or Bosch." This has earned him the nickname "the modern Hogarth." Others have compared his graphic style, as well as his mixture of satire and humanism, to artists of preceding generations, such as Francisco Goya, Honoré Daumier, Max Beckmann, and George Grosz. "Imagine a lumpish amalgamation of Saul Steinberg and George Grosz, leavened with Red Grooms and peppered with Mel Brooks, and you will have some idea of the erudite slapstick Mr. Colescott engages in."

== Honors ==
Colescott has been recognized by several major honors and fellowships. These include a Fulbright Fellowship to England in 1957, a John Simon Guggenheim Memorial Foundation Fellowship in 1965, and fellowships from the National Endowment for the Arts in 1979 and 1983. He is a Fellow of the Wisconsin Academy of Sciences, Arts, and Letters, and was named an Academician of the National Academy of Design in 1992.
