= Santos Zingale =

American painter

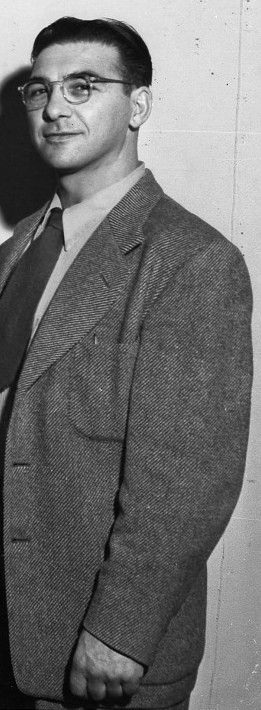
- Santos Zingale c. 1956
- Born: April 17, 1908; Milwaukee, Wisconsin, US
- Died: October 4, 1999 (aged 91); Madison, Wisconsin, US
- Education: Milwaukee State Teachers College
- Known for: Painting, Printmaking
- Movement: Magic Realism, Regionalism, Social Realism

Santos Ision Jackson Zingale (April 17, 1908 – October 4, 1999) was an American artist known for his regionalist and social realist paintings.

== Biography ==
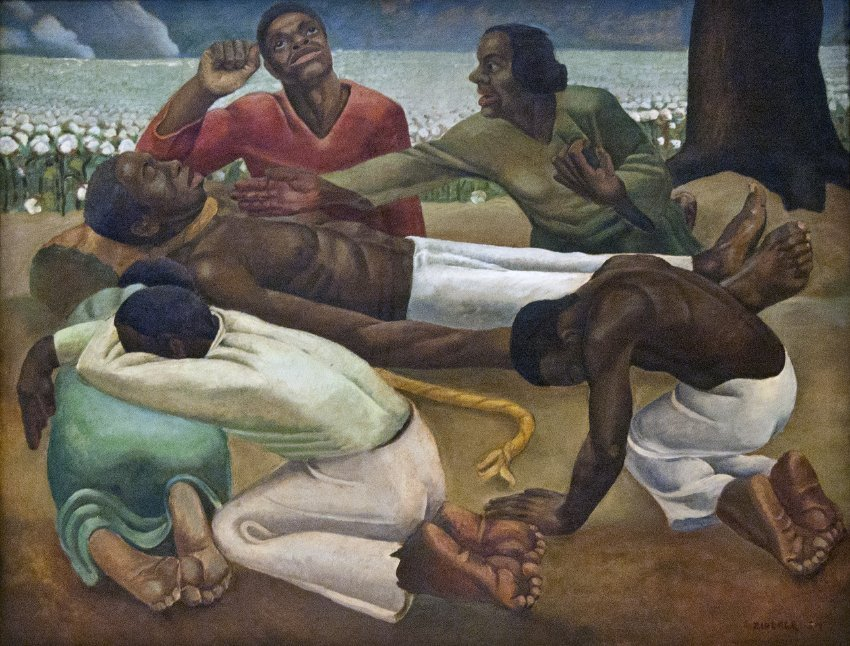
Lynch Law, 1934, oil on canvas, 37 3/4 x 49 3/4 inches, UWM Art Collection. Produced while Zingale was working for the Public Works of Art Project.

Santos Zingale was born in Milwaukee, Wisconsin, on April 17, 1908 to Sicilian immigrant parents. He attended Lincoln High School in Milwaukee, as well as Milwaukee State Teacher's College. In the 1930s, he shared studio space with Alfred Sessler in the Plankinton Building in Milwaukee. Between 1931 and 1934 he taught art at Milwaukee County Day School and the Young Pioneers School. In 1937, Zingale was an officer of the Wisconsin Artists Federation as well as a member of Wisconsin Painters and Sculptors. During the Depression, he participated in arts projects that were part of the New Deal, including the Public Works of Art Project and the Federal Art Project. At this time he notably created murals for the Sturgeon Bay Post Office and the Henry Mitchell High School in Racine, Wisconsin.

In 1943, he received his Masters of Education from the University of Wisconsin-Madison under the advisement of painter John Stewart Curry. From 1944 to 1946, Zingale served in the United States Navy aboard the USS Bremerton (CA-130) where he is also known to have produced several sketches of his fellow service members in their daily life. Following his time in the Navy, he became a professor of art at the University of Wisconsin–Madison until his retirement in 1978.

Zingale died in Madison, Wisconsin on October 4, 1999.

== Themes and style ==
Santos Zingale was known for depicting rural and urban social landscapes of the 20th century. Zingale was concerned with the destruction of Milwaukee’s old neighborhoods, creating emotionally captivating images documenting the people, streets and city of his family neighborhood. His work in the 1930s was political, looking at social themes from conditions of African Americans to people fleeing the Spanish Civil War. Zingale was labeled as a "radical artist" by the press and in 1935 he wrote, "Art must help the development of human consciousness and improve the social order". Zingale’s major works are representational, though arguably not realist. His early scenes of urban realism used strong contrast of light and dark, like those of his artist friend Joseph Friebert. Later he produced colorful, surrealist paintings that were part fact and part fantasy. Color, design and painted surfaces were major concerns in his practice.

== Notable collections ==
- Milwaukee Art Museum
- Museum of Wisconsin Art
- Wisconsin Veterans Museum
- Racine Art Museum
- Chazen Museum of Art
- University of Wisconsin-Milwaukee
- Marquette University
