= Walter Hamady =

American artist (1940–2019)

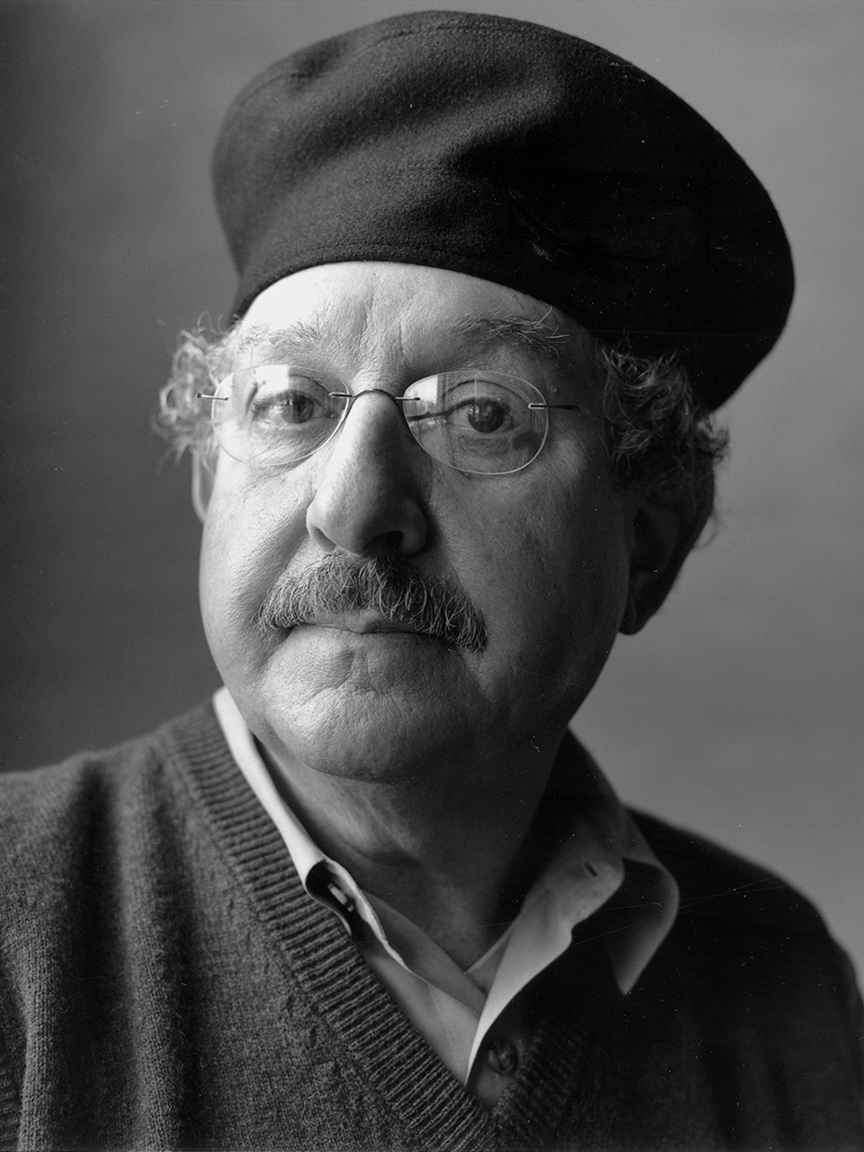
Walter S.H. Hamady, 2004

Walter Samuel Haatoum Hamady (September 13, 1940 - September 13, 2019) was an American artist, book designer, papermaker, poet and teacher. He is especially known for his innovative efforts in letterpress printing, bookbinding, and papermaking. In the mid-1960s, he founded The Perishable Press Limited and the Shadwell Papermill, and soon after joined the faculty at the University of Wisconsin–Madison, where he taught for more than thirty years.

== Early years ==
On his father's side, Hamady is descended from Lebanese Druze immigrants who founded a prominent grocery store chain in Flint, Michigan. His mother was an Iowa-born physician (a pediatrician and, later, a psychiatrist). His parents' marriage fell apart during Hamady's childhood, resulting in his being raised by his mother, with the support of his paternal grandfather (his beloved Jidu (grandfather)), Ralph Haatoum Hamady, whom Hamady has described as "a wonderful man [from Baaqline, Lebanon] who came to America as a teenager in 1907".

After high school, Hamady studied art at Wayne State University in Detroit, Michigan (BFA 1964), and at nearby Cranbrook Academy of Art (MFA 1966). While still an undergraduate, concurrent with a visit to his relatives in Iowa City, Iowa, he was introduced to book artist Harry Duncan, who was a teacher at the time at the University of Iowa (Iowa City), and an important contributor to the revival of interest in letterpress printing. During that visit, Hamady saw for the first time a finely printed handmade book, in the tradition of the Kelmscott Press of William Morris, and the Private Press Movement. Soon after, in Detroit in 1964, while still an undergraduate, he founded his own press, which he named The Perishable Press Limited. And then, as a graduate student at Cranbrook, he launched the Shadwell Papermill, by which he contributed to the experimental use of handmade papers.

== Teaching ==
In 1966, Hamady became a member of the art faculty at the University of Wisconsin, Madison, where for over thirty years he taught papermaking, letterpress printing, and bookbinding. Using the Perishable Press trade name, he has designed and printed 131 limited edition books by such well-known writers as Paul Blackburn, Robert Creeley, Robert Duncan (the Black Mountain poets), Loren Eiseley, Lawrence Ferlinghetti, Kenneth Bernard, Clarence Major, Allen Ginsberg, Denise Levertov, W. S. Merwin, Howard Nemerov, Toby Olson, Richard Wiley, Joel Oppenheimer, Reeve Lindbergh, Jonathan Williams, William Stafford, Bobby Byrd and Paul Auster. In the process, he has also collaborated with a number of visual artists (who have illustrated his books), among them John Wilde, Henrik Drescher, David McLimans, Jim Lee, Peter Sís, Margaret Sunday, Lane Hall, and Jack Beal. While admired for his artist's books, he is equally or even more widely admired for his achievements as a teacher.

== Gabberjabbs ==
Hamady's, artist's books embarked on a series in 1973 called, The Interminable Gabberjabbs, in which he made strange, satirical use of disturbing Surrealist strategies like free association, found imagery, and the radical juxtaposition of advertising ephemera. Throughout that series (there are eight gabberjabbs), he pokes fun at nearly everything, including his own artistic seriousness, the snobbery of those who claim to be scholars, and the widespread, unchallenged assumption that traditional page layout and, particularly, typography, are governed by immutable rules.

== Collage and assemblage ==
For most of his professional life, Hamady has also been a collage artist. Although he has made frequent use of drawing and photography in illustrating his books, his involvement with collage has grown to include the construction of box-like assemblages of metal type, altered images, and fragments of other ephemera from the history of printing.

== Collections ==
Hamady's handmade books and other works are in the collections of numerous libraries, museums and art centers in the United States and in other countries. These include, to name a few, the British Museum, Harvard University, Newberry Library, Oxford University, Yale University, Cleveland Institute of Art, Northern Illinois University, Getty Center, Grolier Club (New York), Lenin Library (Moscow), Library of Congress, Minneapolis Institute of Art, Royal Library (Stockholm, Sweden), Stony Brook University, Walker Art Center, Whitney Museum of American Art, and the Victoria and Albert Museum.

== Awards ==
Over the years, Hamady has received numerous awards in recognition of his work. On thirteen occasions (and in one case, twice in a single year), his books have been selected by the American Institute of Graphic Arts (AIGA) for their annual exhibition called Fifty Books of the Year. He was awarded a John Simon Guggenheim Memorial Foundation Fellowship in 1969, has received three artist's research grants from the National Endowment for the Arts, and, in 2006, was elected to the College of Fellows of the American Crafts Council. In 2004, he was chosen by I.D.: International Design Magazine as one of the top fifty designers in the U.S.

== Selected publications ==
- Hamady, W. Interminable Gabberjabbs (Mt. Horeb, WI, 1973).
- Hamady, W. Hunkering in Wisconsin: Another Interminable Gaggerblabb (Mt. Horeb, WI, 1974).
- Hamady, W. Thumbnailing the Hilex / Gabberjabb Number 3 (Mt. Horeb, WI, 1974).
- Hamady, W. The Interminable Gabberjabb Volume One (&) Number Four (Mt. Horeb, WI, 1975).
- Hamady, W. For the Hundredth Time Gabberjabb Number Five (Mt. Horeb, WI, 1981).
- Hamady, W. Hand Papermaking: Papermaking by Hand, Being a Book of Suspicions (Mt. Horeb, WI, 1982).
- Hamady, W. Neopostmodrinism or Dieser Rasen ist kein Hundeklo or Gabberjabb Number 6 (Mt. Horeb, WI, 1988).
- Hamady, W. and John Wilde, 1985: The Twelve Months: a collaboration (Mt. Horeb, WI: Perishable Press Limited,1992).
- Hamady, W. Traveling or NeoPostModrinPreMortemism or Dieser Rasen ist kein Hundeklo (II) or Interminable Gabberjabb Number Seven (Mt. Horeb, WI, 1996).
- Hamady, W. Hunkering, The Last Gabberjabb (Mt. Horeb, WI, 2006).
- Hamady, W. A Timeline of Sorts (Mt. Horeb, WI, 2011).
