= James Watrous =

American painter

James Scales Watrous (August 3, 1908 – 1999) was an American painter, muralist and educator born in Winfield, Kansas. He studied at the University of Wisconsin, where he also taught art history.

== Works ==
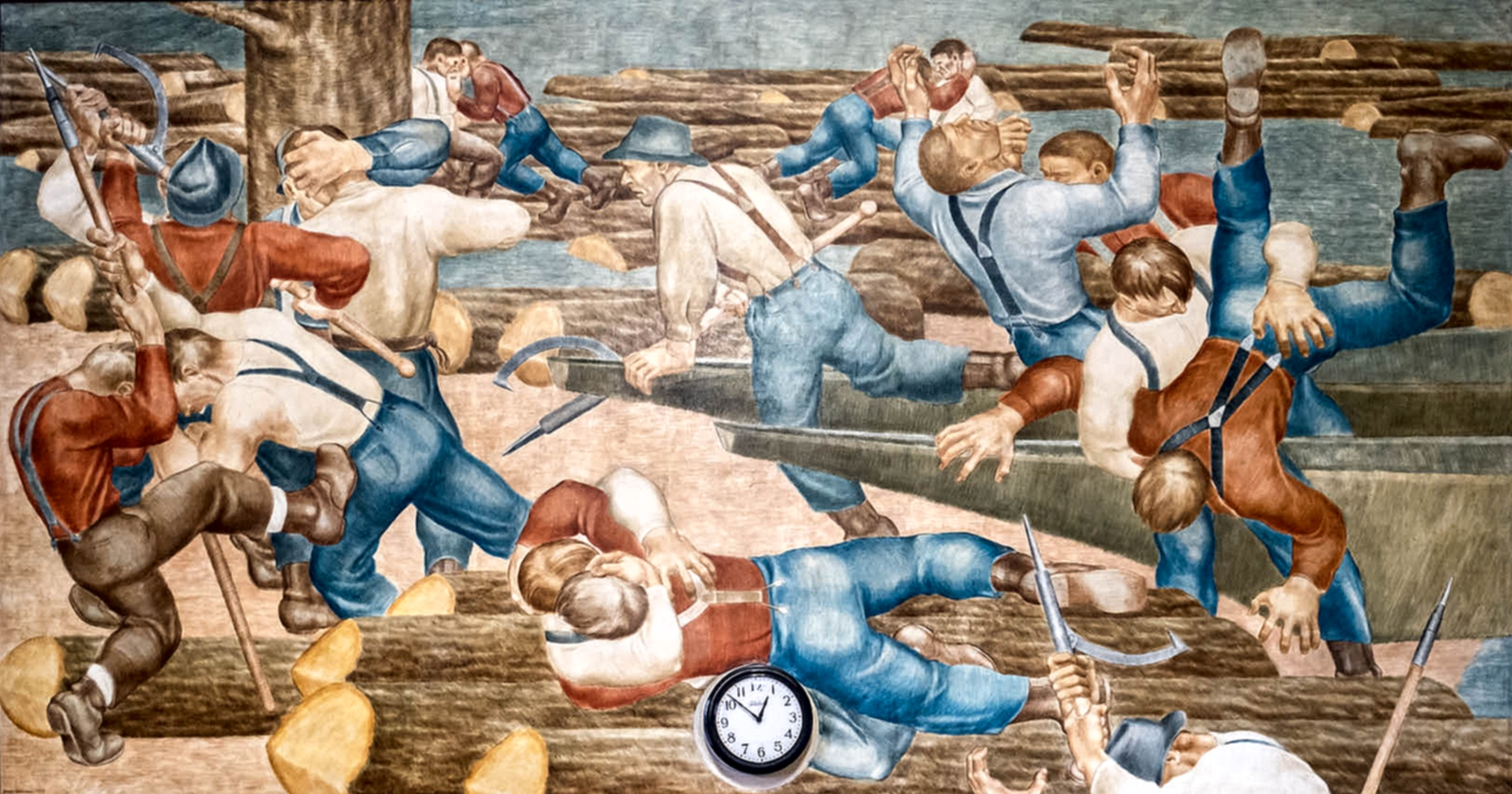
Lumberjack Fight on the Flambeau River (1938), mural for the United States Post Office in Park Falls, Wisconsin

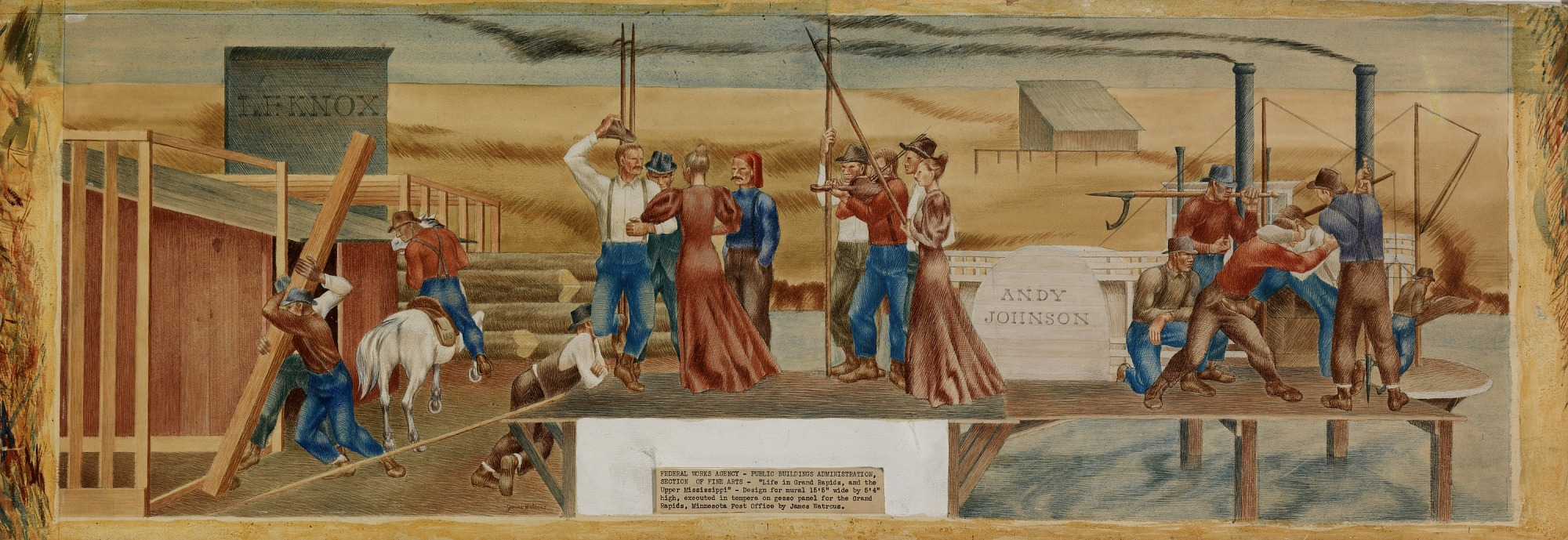
Study for Life in Grand Rapids and the Upper Mississippi (1940), mural for the post office in Grand Rapids, Minnesota

=== Art ===
Watrous painted The Story of Paul Bunyan, an egg tempera on gesso mural, consisting of nine 6′ tall panels, in 1935 with funds provided by the federal government. The mural is displayed in the Paul Bunyan Room at Memorial Union, University of Wisconsin–Madison, Madison, Wisconsin

Lumberjack Fight on the Flambeau River, an egg tempera mural, painted in 1938 inside the post office in Park Falls, Wisconsin, commissioned by the Section of Painting and Sculpture.

=== Publications ===
- The Craft of Old-Master Drawings. Madison: University of Wisconsin Press, 1957.
- A Century Of American Printmaking: 1880-1980. Madison: University of Wisconsin Press, 1984.
- with Andrew Stevens. American Color Woodcuts: Bounty from the Block, 1890s-1990s: A Century of Color Woodcuts. Madison: Elvehjem Museum of Art, University of Wisconsin-Madison, 1993.
