= Hollandale, Wisconsin =

- Village
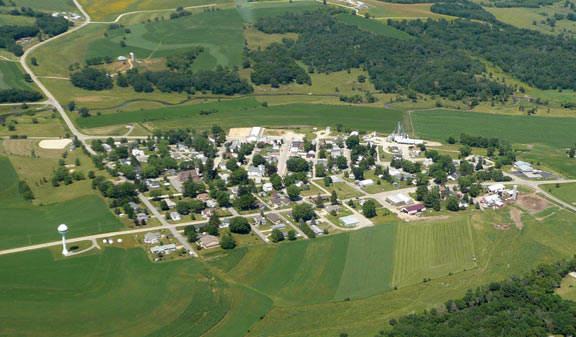
- Aerial view of Hollandale

- Location of Hollandale in Iowa County, Wisconsin.
- Coordinates: 42°52′34″N 89°56′10″W
- Country: United States
- State: Wisconsin
- County: Iowa

Area
  - Total: 0.68 sq mi (1.75 km^{2})
  - Land: 0.68 sq mi (1.75 km^{2})
  - Water: 0 sq mi (0.00 km^{2})
- Elevation: 889 ft (271 m)

Population (2020)
  - Total: 306
  - Density: 405.9/sq mi (156.73/km^{2})
- Time zone: UTC-6 (Central (CST))
  - Summer (DST): UTC-5 (CDT)
- Area code: 608
- FIPS code: 55-35400
- GNIS feature ID: 1566549
- Website: http://hollandalewi.com/

Hollandale is a village in Iowa County, Wisconsin, United States. The population was 306 at the 2020 census. It is part of the Madison Metropolitan Statistical Area.

== History ==
The village was first named Bennville and later was named Hollandale. Both names were for Bjorn Holland (1841-1930), a merchant, teacher, and a Wisconsin state legislator, who settled in the area.

== Geography ==
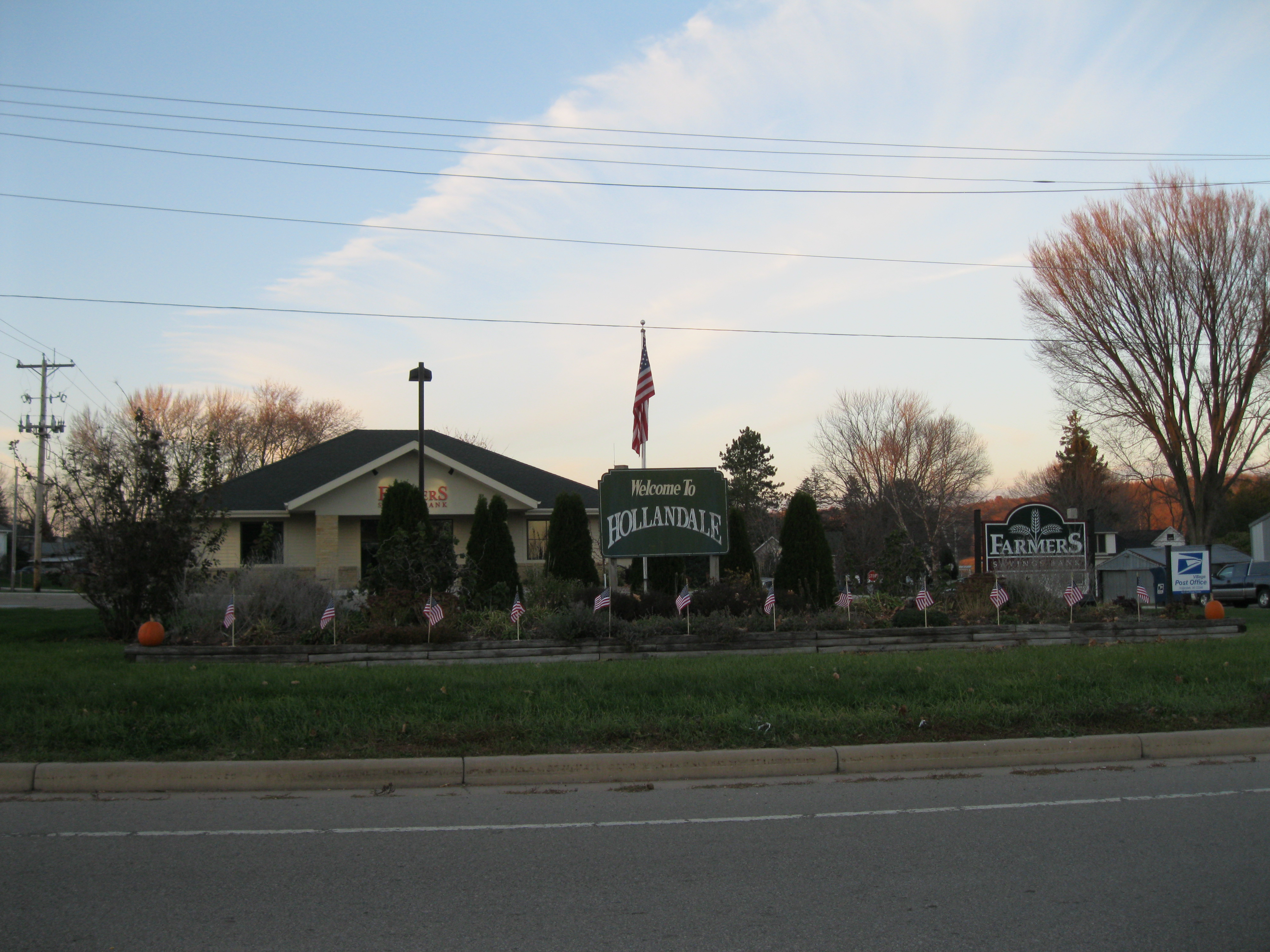
Welcome sign in front of the post office

Hollandale is located at 42°52′34″N 89°56′10″W (42.876139, -89.936023).

According to the United States Census Bureau, the village has a total area of 0.69 square miles (1.79 km^{2}), all land.

== Demographics ==
Historical population
Census	Pop.	Note	%±
1910	265		—
1920	236		−10.9%
1930	241		2.1%
1940	290		20.3%
1950	281		−3.1%
1960	275		−2.1%
1970	256		−6.9%
1980	271		5.9%
1990	256		−5.5%
2000	283		10.5%
2010	288		1.8%
2020	306		6.3%
U.S. Decennial Census

=== 2010 census ===
As of the census of 2010, there were 288 people, 116 households, and 74 families living in the village. The population density was 417.4 inhabitants per square mile (161.2/km^{2}). There were 132 housing units at an average density of 191.3 per square mile (73.9/km^{2}). The racial makeup of the village was 98.3% White, 0.7% African American, and 1.0% from two or more races.

There were 116 households, of which 34.5% had children under the age of 18 living with them, 48.3% were married couples living together, 8.6% had a female householder with no husband present, 6.9% had a male householder with no wife present, and 36.2% were non-families. 28.4% of all households were made up of individuals, and 10.3% had someone living alone who was 65 years of age or older. The average household size was 2.48 and the average family size was 3.12.

The median age in the village was 34.3 years. 28.5% of residents were under the age of 18; 4.5% were between the ages of 18 and 24; 32.9% were from 25 to 44; 21.9% were from 45 to 64; and 12.2% were 65 years of age or older. The gender makeup of the village was 50.7% male and 49.3% female.

=== 2000 census ===
As of the census of 2000, there were 283 people, 121 households, and 75 families living in the village. The population density was 409.4 people per square mile (158.4/km^{2}). There were 128 housing units at an average density of 185.2 per square mile (71.6/km^{2}). The racial makeup of the village was 99.29% White, 0.71% from other races. Hispanic or Latino of any race were 0.35% of the population.

There were 121 households, out of which 30.6% had children under the age of 18 living with them, 51.2% were married couples living together, 5.0% had a female householder with no husband present, and 38.0% were non-families. 32.2% of all households were made up of individuals, and 21.5% had someone living alone who was 65 years of age or older. The average household size was 2.34 and the average family size was 2.99.

In the village, the population was spread out, with 22.6% under the age of 18, 5.7% from 18 to 24, 29.3% from 25 to 44, 23.0% from 45 to 64, and 19.4% who were 65 years of age or older. The median age was 40 years. For every 100 females, there were 100.7 males. For every 100 females age 18 and over, there were 97.3 males.

The median income for a household in the village was $35,938, and the median income for a family was $50,139. Males had a median income of $34,167 versus $23,036 for females. The per capita income for the village was $21,141. About 2.9% of families and 3.5% of the population were below the poverty line, including none of those under the age of eighteen and 5.8% of those 65 or over.

== Notable people ==
- Warrington Colescott, artist
