= Gertrude Abercrombie =

American painter (1909–1977)

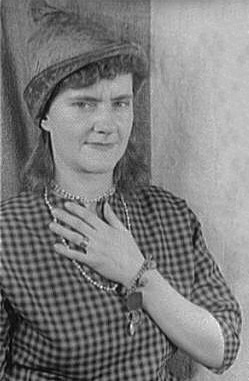
- Abercrombie in 1951
- Born: February 17, 1909; Austin, Texas, United States
- Died: July 3, 1977 (aged 68); Chicago, Illinois, United States
- Education: University of Illinois; Art Institute of Chicago
- Known for: Painting

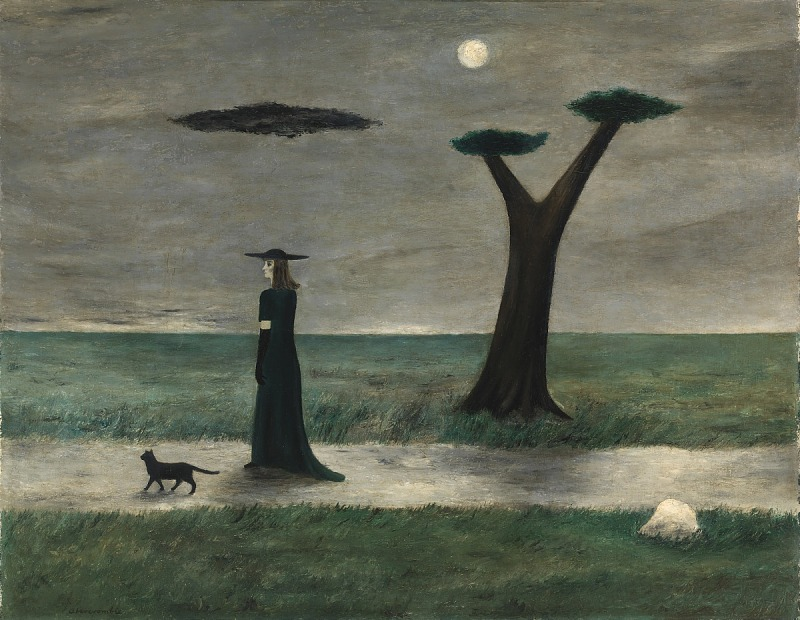
Gertrude Abercrombie, The Stroll (1943)

Gertrude Abercrombie (February 17, 1909 – July 3, 1977) was an American painter based in Chicago. Called "the queen of the Bohemian artists", Abercrombie was involved in the Chicago jazz scene and was friends with musicians such as Dizzy Gillespie, Charlie Parker, and Sarah Vaughan, whose music inspired her own creative work.

== Early life ==
Abercrombie was born on February 17, 1909, in Austin, Texas. Her parents, Tom and Lula Janes Abercrombie, were traveling opera singers who happened to be in Austin on the day of Gertrude's birth. The family lived in Berlin in 1913 to further her mother's career, but the beginning of World War I caused the family to move back to the United States. Upon their return the family lived in Aledo, Illinois, before settling in Hyde Park, Chicago in 1916. She was raised in a strict Christian Scientist environment at home.

She earned a degree in Romance languages from the University of Illinois at Urbana–Champaign in 1929. After studying figure drawing briefly at the Art Institute of Chicago, she took a year-long course in commercial art at the American Academy of Art in Chicago, leading to her first job drawing gloves for Mesirow Department Store advertisements. She also worked briefly as an artist for Sears.

== Fine art career ==
In 1932, she began to focus strictly on her art. The following summer she made her first sale at an outdoor art fair in Chicago and received an honorable mention in the newspaper for the event. In the mid-1930s she moved out of her family's home and became active in the regional art scene. From 1934 to 1940 she served as a painter for the Works Progress Administration and in 1934 the Chicago Society of Artists held a solo show of her work. During the 1930s and 1940s she also began creating woodcuts.

In 1940, she married lawyer Robert Livingston, and in 1942 gave birth to their daughter Dinah. In 1948 the couple divorced. That same year she married music critic Frank Sandiford, with Dizzy Gillespie performing at the wedding. The couple were active in the bohemian lifestyle and jazz scene of Chicago hence their connection with Gillespie. They met musicians through Sandiford and through Abercrombie's own skills as an improvisational pianist. The couple divorced in 1964.

Dizzy Gillespie with Abercrombie on his birthday, 1964

Within Abercrombie's avant-garde social circle she was the inspiration for the song "Gertrude's Bounce" by Richie Powell, who claimed that she walked "just like the way the rhythm sounds in the Introduction", and she appeared as herself in James Purdy's Gertrude of Stony Island Avenue and as a fictional character in Purdy's Malcolm, Eustace Chisholm.

In 1951, Abercrombie painted an 8"x11" work called Alderman Merriam's Shells, which she gifted to a doctor for a surgical procedure. It stayed in the doctor's family for 75 years until a collector spotted it at an estate sale in Kalamazoo, Michigan in July 2026 and paid $30 for it. After restoration it sold at an auction for $1.35 million on October 1, 2026, a new record for Abercrombie's art work.

== Death ==
By the late 1950s, her health declined as a result of financial trouble, alcoholism, and arthritis, and she became reclusive. After 1959, her paintings diminished in number as well as scale. She required a wheelchair and was eventually bedridden. In the final year of her life, a major retrospective of her work was held at the Hyde Park Art Center. She died in Chicago on July 3, 1977. Her will established the Gertrude Abercrombie Trust which distributed her work and the work of other artists she owned to cultural institutions throughout the Midwest.

== Themes ==
Abercrombie painted many variations of her favored subjects: sparsely furnished interiors, barren landscapes, self-portraits, and still-lifes. Many of her compositions feature a lone woman in a flowing gown, often depicted with attributes of sorcery: an owl, a black cat, a crystal ball, or a broomstick. These works were often self-portraits, as she stated in an interview with Studs Terkel shortly before her death: "it is always myself that I paint". Tall and sharp-featured, she considered herself ugly; in life she sometimes wore a pointed velvet hat to accentuate her witch-like appearance, "enjoy[ing] the power this artifice gave her over others who would fear or recoil from her". Abercrombie also drew inspiration from her dreams as a "self-proclaimed" source for her paintings to convey reality, but with illusions of fantasy. The 1940s and '50s have been described as her most prolific and productive period; a time when she no longer painted many portraits, but retained the themes mentioned above.

Abercrombie's mature works are painted in a precise, controlled style. She took little interest in other artists' work, although she admired Magritte. Largely self-taught, she did not regard her lack of extensive formal training as a hindrance. She said of her work:

I am not interested in complicated things nor in the commonplace. I like and like to paint simple things that are a little strange. My work comes directly from my inner consciousness and it must come easily. It is a process of selection and reduction.

Her work evolved into incorporating her love for jazz music, inspired by parties and jam sessions she hosted in her Hyde Park home. Musicians such as Sonny Rollins, Max Roach, Jackie Cain, and the Modern Jazz Quartet were considered friends. Dizzy Gillespie described her as "the first bop artist. Bop in the sense that she has taken the essence of our music and transported it to another art form".

== Exhibitions ==
=== Solo exhibitions ===
- Gertrude Abercrombie: The Whole World is a Mystery. Carnegie Museum of Art, Pittsburgh, Pennsylvania, January 18 – June 1, 2025, Colby College Museum of Art, Waterville, Maine, July 12, 2025 – January 11, 2026, Milwaukee Art Museum, Milwaukee, Wisconsin, March 27 – July 19, 2026; catalog edited by Eric Crosby and Sarah Humphreville.
- Gertrude Abercrombie: Portrait of an Artist as a Landscape. Elmhurst Art Museum, January 20 – March 4, 2018.
- Gertrude Abercrombie. State of Illinois Art Gallery, Chicago, March 18 – May 17, 1991 and at the Illinois State Museum, Springfield, July 28 – October 25, 1991.
- Gertrude Abercrombie: A Retrospective Exhibition. Hyde Park Art Center, January 28 – March 5, 1977.
- Gertrude Abercrombie. Newman Brown Gallery, 1952.
- Gertrude Abercrombie. Leonard Linn Gallery. Winnetka, Illinois, 1952.
- Gertrude Abercrombie. Steven-Gross Gallery. Chicago, Illinois, 1952.

=== Group exhibitions ===
- In Wonderland: The Surrealist Adventures of Women Artists in Mexico and the United States, Los Angeles County Museum of Art, 2012
- Gertrude Abercrombie and friends: An Exhibition of the work by Gertrude Abercrombie (1909-1977) and her Contemporaries Donated to the Illinois State Museum by the Gertrude Abercrombie Estate. February 6 – March 27, 1983, Illinois State Museum, Springfield.
- Chicago Avant-Garde: Five Women Ahead of Their Time. September 10 – December 30, 2021. Newberry Library, Chicago, Illinois.

== Notable awards ==
- Prize, Annual Exhibition of Works by Artists of Chicago and Vicinity, 1936;1938, Art Institute of Chicago

== See also ==
- Women Surrealists
