= Alfred Sessler =

American artist (1909–1963)

Alfred A. Sessler
- Born: January 14, 1909; Milwaukee, Wisconsin
- Died: September 16, 1963 (aged 54); Madison, Wisconsin
- Known for: Painter, printmaker, educator

Alfred A. Sessler (1909–1963) was an American artist known for his murals for the Works Progress Administration (WPA), his printmaking, and his career as a teacher.

== Biography ==
Sessler was born in Milwaukee, Wisconsin, on January 14, 1909. He attended the Layton School of Art in the early 1930s. He later attended the Milwaukee State Teachers College, graduating in 1944. He earned his Master of Arts degree the following year from University of Wisconsin–Madison.

Sessler painted two murals for the New Deal art project, the Treasury Section of Fine Arts. He painted the mural entitled Gager’s Trading Post on the Wadsworth Trail for the United States post office in Morris, Minnesota. He also painted the mural entitled Lumbering in Early Lowell for the Lowell, Michigan post office. Sessler also created lithograph prints for the Federal Art Project.

In 1945 Sessler began teaching at the University of Wisconsin–Madison where he founded their graphic arts program. Sessler is credited with creating the color reduction woodcut. He taught at University of Wisconsin until his death.

Sessler died on September 16, 1963, in Madison, Wisconsin.

His work is in the collection of the National Gallery of Art, the Smithsonian American Art Museum, and the Syracuse University Art Museum.

In 1988 the Wisconsin Academy of Sciences, Arts, Letters Gallery held a retrospective of his work entitled The prints of Alfred Sessler from 1935 to 1963. In 2015 Sessler was included in the exhibition Founders & Visionaries: Wisconsin Jewish Artists from the Milwaukee Art Museum at the Jewish Museum Milwaukee.
