= Andrew Haben =

19th century American politician

Member of the Wisconsin Senate from the 19th district
- In office January 6, 1879 – January 3, 1881
- Preceded by: Return Torrey
- Succeeded by: Joseph B. Hamilton

19th & 24th Mayor of Oshkosh, Wisconsin
- In office April 1885 – April 1886
- Preceded by: Charles D. Health
- Succeeded by: Carlton Foster
- In office April 1876 – April 1878
- Preceded by: Joseph Stringham
- Succeeded by: Sanford Beckwith

Member of the Wisconsin State Assembly from the Winnebago 1st district
- In office January 5, 1885 – January 3, 1887
- Preceded by: Earl Finch
- Succeeded by: James B. McLeran
- In office January 2, 1882 – January 1, 1883
- Preceded by: William Wall
- Succeeded by: Earl Finch

Personal details
- Born: December 23, 1834 Urexweiler, Rhine Province, Kingdom of Prussia
- Died: January 18, 1908 (aged 73) Oshkosh, Wisconsin, U.S.
- Resting place: Riverside Cemetery, Oshkosh, Wisconsin
- Party: Democratic
- Spouse: Matilda N. McCourt (m. 1866–1908)
- Children: Regina (Halter)^{(b. 1867; died 1935)}; Vincent Haben^{(b. 1868; died 1872)}; Leo Haben^{(b. 1870; died 1947)}; Irene (Viall)^{(b. 1872; died 1931)}; Bazilla Haben^{(b. 1874; died 1875)}; Andrew Haben Jr.^{(b. 1875; died 1937)}

Andrew Haben (December 23, 1834 – January 18, 1908) was a German-American immigrant, businessman, Democratic politician, and Wisconsin pioneer. He was the 19th and 24th mayor of Oshkosh, Wisconsin, and represented Winnebago County in the Wisconsin State Senate and Assembly. He was also an unsuccessful candidate for U.S. Congress.

== Biography ==
Born in the Rhine Province, in the Kingdom of Prussia, Haben emigrated with his parents to the United States in 1837 and settled in Dansville, New York. In 1855, Haben moved to Oshkosh, Wisconsin, and worked as a merchant tailor. He also became active in the real estate trade in Oshkosh.

Haben became active with the Democratic Party of Wisconsin, and was elected mayor of Oshkosh in 1876 and 1877. In 1878, he was elected to the Wisconsin State Senate from the 19th State Senate district. At the time, the district comprised all of Winnebago County. Haben was the first Democrat to represent Winnebago County in the Wisconsin State Senate since 1856.

During his first year as state senator, he was the Democratic nominee for State Treasurer of Wisconsin. He was defeated along with the rest of the Democratic ticket in the 1879 general election.

He was subsequently elected to the Wisconsin State Assembly from Winnebago County's 1st Assembly district. In 1882, he ran for a seat in the United States House of Representatives, in Wisconsin's 6th congressional district, but was defeated by incumbent Richard W. Guenther.

He was elected to another term in the State Assembly in 1884, and during that term, he was elected to another term as mayor in 1885. In 1886, he ran for Congress again, but was defeated again, by Guenther's successor, Charles B. Clark.

Haben retired from business and politics in 1890 and moved with his family to Denver, Colorado. He stayed for nine years, but abandoned Colorado after a fire destroyed much of his property there in 1899. He returned to Oshkosh, but had little further engagement in business or politics. He died of heart disease at his home in Oshkosh, on January 18, 1908.

== Electoral history ==
=== Wisconsin Senate (1878) ===
Wisconsin Senate, 19th District Election, 1878
Party	Candidate	Votes	%	±%
General Election, November 5, 1878
Democratic	Andrew Haben	2,855	40.38%	−8.65%
Republican	L. E. Knapp	2,797	39.56%	−11.40%
Greenback	W. E. Hanson	1,418	20.06%	
Plurality		58	0.82%	-1.11%
Total votes		7,070	100.0%	-25.03%
Democratic gain from Republican				

=== Wisconsin State Treasurer (1879) ===
Wisconsin State Treasurer Election, 1879
Party	Candidate	Votes	%	±%
General Election, November 4, 1879
Republican	Richard W. Guenther	101,745	54.00%	+7.63%
Democratic	Andrew Haben	73,668	39.10%	−0.02%
Greenback	Peter A. Griffiths	13,002	6.90%	−7.62%
Plurality		28,077	14.90%	+7.65%
Total votes		188,415	100.0%	+7.74%
Republican hold				

=== Wisconsin Assembly (1881) ===
Wisconsin Assembly, Winnebago 1st District Election, 1881
Party	Candidate	Votes	%	±%
General Election, November 8, 1881
Democratic	Andrew Haben	932	53.87%	
Republican	William Wall (incumbent)	647	37.40%	−27.23%
Prohibition	B. E. Van Kuren	151	8.73%	
Plurality		285	16.47%	-14.98%
Total votes		1,730	100.0%	-37.81%
Democratic gain from Republican				

=== U.S. House of Representatives (1882) ===
Wisconsin's 6th Congressional District Election, 1882
Party	Candidate	Votes	%	±%
General Election, November 7, 1882
Republican	Richard W. Guenther (incumbent)	10,303	44.14%	−8.37%
Democratic	Andrew Haben	9,265	39.69%	−4.07%
Prohibition	Theodore D. Kanouse	3,275	14.03%	
Greenback	L. A. Stewart	496	2.12%	−1.62%
	Scattering	5	0.02%	
Plurality		1,038	4.45%	-4.30%
Total votes		23,344	100.0%	-39.23%
Republican hold				

=== Wisconsin Assembly (1884) ===
Wisconsin Assembly, Winnebago 1st District Election, 1884
Party	Candidate	Votes	%	±%
General Election, November 4, 1884
Democratic	Andrew Haben	1,967	51.76%	+0.36%
Republican	Ephraim E. Stevens	1,760	46.32%	+12.09%
Prohibition	Joshua Dalton	73	1.92%	−12.44%
Plurality		207	5.45%	-11.73%
Total votes		3,800	100.0%	+50.38%
Democratic hold				

=== U.S. House of Representatives (1886) ===
Wisconsin's 6th Congressional District Election, 1886
Party	Candidate	Votes	%	±%
General Election, November 2, 1886
Republican	Charles B. Clark	15,983	54.60%	+8.41%
Democratic	Andrew Haben	11,526	39.38%	−10.54%
Prohibition	Theodore D. Kanouse	1,761	6.02%	+3.11%
	Scattering	2	0.01%	
Plurality		4,457	15.23%	+11.49%
Total votes		29,272	100.0%	-11.04%
Republican hold				

== See also ==
- List of mayors of Oshkosh, Wisconsin

Party political offices
Preceded by John Ringle	Democratic nominee for State Treasurer of Wisconsin; 1879	Succeeded by Frank R. Falk
Wisconsin State Assembly
Preceded by William Wall	Member of the Wisconsin State Assembly from the Winnebago 1st district January 2, 1882 – January 1, 1883	Succeeded by Earl Finch
Preceded by Earl Finch	Member of the Wisconsin State Assembly from the Winnebago 1st district January 5, 1885 – January 3, 1887	Succeeded by James B. McLeran
Wisconsin Senate
Preceded by Return Torrey	Member of the Wisconsin Senate from the 19th district January 6, 1879 – January 3, 1881	Succeeded by Joseph B. Hamilton
Political offices
Preceded by Joseph Stringham	Mayor of Oshkosh, Wisconsin; April 1876 – April 1878	Succeeded by Sanford Beckwith
Preceded by Charles D. Health	Mayor of Oshkosh, Wisconsin; April 1885 – April 1886	Succeeded by Carlton Foster
