= Henry C. Jewell (Wisconsin pioneer) =

American politician (1811–1889)

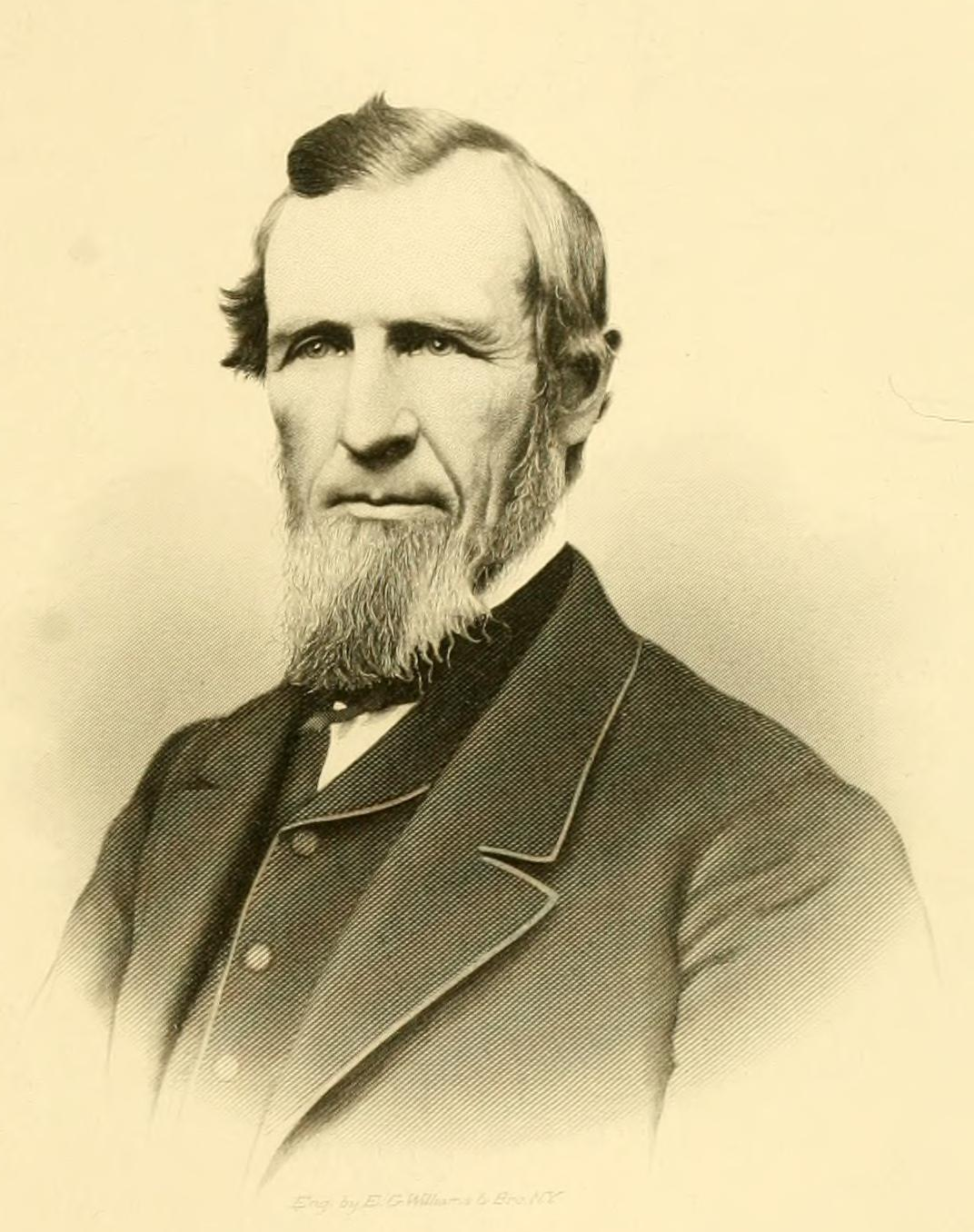
- Engraving by E. G. Williams & Brothers, N.Y.

Chairman of the Board of Supervisors of Winnebago County, Wisconsin
- In office November 14, 1876 – November 12, 1878
- Preceded by: E. D. Henry
- Succeeded by: Lucas M. Miller

Member of the Wisconsin State Assembly from the Winnebago 1st district
- In office January 7, 1867 – January 6, 1868
- Preceded by: William H. Doe
- Succeeded by: Luther Buxton

8th Mayor of Oshkosh, Wisconsin
- In office April 1862 – April 1863
- Preceded by: John Fitzgerald
- Succeeded by: Philetus Sawyer

Personal details
- Born: December 1, 1811 Salisbury, Connecticut, U.S.
- Died: January 1, 1889 (aged 77) Oshkosh, Wisconsin, U.S.
- Resting place: Riverside Cemetery, Oshkosh
- Party: Republican
- Spouse: Mary Ann Russell (m. 1833)
- Children: Maria Chapin Jewell^{(b. 1834; died 1853)}; William Ezra Jewell^{(b. 1836; died 1855)}; Mary Eleanor (Sawyer)^{(b. 1842; died 1910)}; Henry Augustus Jewell^{(b. 1843; died 1911)}; Catherine Russell Jewell^{(b. 1845; died 1845)}; Robert Graham Jewell^{(b. 1849; died 1849)}
- Occupation: Merchant

Henry Chapin Jewell (December 1, 1811 – January 1, 1889) was an American businessman, Republican politician, and Wisconsin pioneer. He was the 8th mayor of Oshkosh, Wisconsin, served two years as chairman of the Winnebago County board of supervisors, and represented Oshkosh in the Wisconsin State Assembly during the 1867 term. His name was often abbreviated as H. C. Jewell.

== Biography ==
Henry Chapin Jewell was born in Litchfield County, Connecticut, in December 1811. As an infant, he moved with his parents to Lyons, New York. In 1821, his father died, and he moved with his widowed mother back to Chapinville, Connecticut. As a young man, he went to work as a merchant in Hartford, Connecticut, and went west to the Wisconsin Territory in 1843. He settled a farm in what is now Green Lake County, remaining there for five years. While residing there, he surveyed some of the first roads in that area and built the first schoolhouse. During his years there, the area was still part of Marquette County, and Jewell was elected the first register of deeds of Marquette and was the second postmaster in the county.

In 1848, he moved with his younger brother, Graham, to the village of Algoma, which later became part of the city of Oshkosh, Wisconsin. He went into business with his brother, opening one of the first merchant businesses in what is now Oshkosh. They then became involved in the lumber business, which was flourishing in the region. In 1849, a post office was established in Algoma, and Henry Jewell was appointed the first postmaster there.

He quickly became active in public affairs in Oshkosh. He was elected to the Winnebago County board of supervisors in 1853 as a representative of the town of Algoma. In 1856, the village of Algoma was annexed into the city of Oshkosh, that year Jewell was elected to the city council and went on to serve seven consecutive terms. During his service on the city council, he was also elected, in 1858, to represent the 5th ward of Oshkosh on the county board. In 1862, he left the city council when he was elected mayor of Oshkosh for a one-year term. During the American Civil War, Jewell associated with the National Union Party. He was elected to the Wisconsin State Assembly in 1866 in Winnebago County's 1st Assembly district, running on the National Union ticket.

Jewell remained a member of the Republican Party after the Civil War, and was returned to the city council and county board in 1870. He ran for Assembly again in 1872, but lost the general election to lumberman Thomas Wall. He remained on the county board until 1878, and was elected chairman of the county board in 1876 and 1877. He was defeated seeking a ninth consecutive term on the county board in 1878.

Jewell returned to the county board in 1882 and 1883, but largely retired from public life after that term. He died of a stroke at his home in the West Algoma neighborhood of Oshkosh on January 1, 1889.

== Personal life and family ==
Henry Jewell was the eldest of five children born to Ezra and Mary (née Chapin) Jewell. The Jewell family were descended from Nathaniel Jewell, who settled in the Massachusetts Bay Colony in 1699. Henry's younger brother, Graham, was a business partner in their early years in Wisconsin, but he died in 1851 at age 31.

On October 1, 1833, Henry Jewell married Mary Ann Russell, of Litchfield, Connecticut. They had at seven children together, though their first two children died young and three others died in infancy. Their eldest surviving daughter, Mary Eleanor, went on to marry Edgar P. Sawyer, the eldest son of U.S. senator Philetus Sawyer.

Wisconsin State Assembly
Preceded by William H. Doe	Member of the Wisconsin State Assembly from the Winnebago 1st district January 7, 1867 – January 6, 1868	Succeeded by Luther Buxton
Political offices
Preceded by John Fitzgerald	Mayor of Oshkosh, Wisconsin; April 1862 – April 1863	Succeeded by Philetus Sawyer
Preceded by E. D. Henry	Chairman of the Board of Supervisors of Winnebago County, Wisconsin; November 14, 1876 – November 12, 1878	Succeeded by Lucas M. Miller
