= Edward Eastman =

19th century American politician

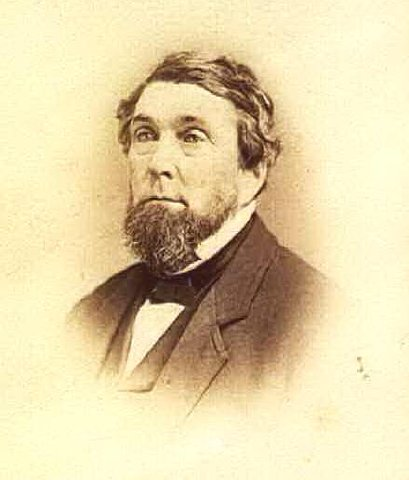
- Photo of Edward Eastman, from a visiting card circa 1867

1st Mayor of Oshkosh, Wisconsin
- In office April 1853 – April 1854
- Preceded by: Position established
- Succeeded by: Joseph Jackson

Member of the Wisconsin State Assembly from the Winnebago County district
- In office January 6, 1851 – January 5, 1852
- Preceded by: Leonard P. Crary
- Succeeded by: Dudley Blodget (Winnebago–Waupaca)

Personal details
- Born: February 22, 1806 Randolph, Vermont, U.S.
- Died: February 23, 1870 (aged 64) Oshkosh, Wisconsin, U.S.
- Resting place: Riverside Cemetery, Oshkosh
- Party: Democratic; Free Soil (1848–1852)
- Spouses: Sarah G. Tracy (m. 1838; died 1840); Catherine Peckham Granger (m. 1841–1870)
- Children: 6
- Occupation: Merchant

Edward Eastman (February 22, 1806 – February 23, 1870) was an American merchant, politician, and pioneer settler of Oshkosh, Wisconsin. He was active in civic and territorial affairs, and known as a Democrat and Free Soiler. In 1847 he was one of a partnership approved by the territorial legislature to build the first bridge across the Fox River in Oshkosh.

After the city was incorporated in 1853, Eastman was elected as the first mayor of Oshkosh. He also served several years before and after that by appointment as its postmaster. In 1850 he was elected and served a single one-year term in the Wisconsin State Assembly as a Free Soil Party member.

After his political career, he became a bookseller in Oshkosh. In the mid-1850s, he was named to the board of directors of two railroads formed in Oshkosh: the Oshkosh & Portage City, and the Winnebago railroads.

== Early life, education and marriages ==
Edward Eastman was born February 22, 1806, in Randolph, Vermont, son of Tilton and Experience (Smith) Eastman, both descended from English ancestors of the colonial period. He was college educated (at an Episcopal seminary, which may explain his nickname of "Deacon"). He worked on his father's farm and helped put two younger brothers through college as well. One of these brothers, George B., would later become a minister in Fond du Lac, Wisconsin.

Eastman married Sarah Tracey, and they had a son George. Sarah died soon after their child's birth. The young widower married again on June 3, 1841, to Catharine Granger (born in 1824). The couple would eventually have four children together.

== Move to Wisconsin ==
In the mid-19th century, following the construction of the Erie Canal in New York, migration increased from New England and New York to the Great Lakes area of the Midwest. The Eastman family were among those moving to Wisconsin Territory in 1846. Eastman spent some time in Dodge County before settling in Oshkosh later that year.

In the town of Oshkosh, Eastman began dealing in general merchandise, and for many years he was in partnership with L. M. Miller. He was appointed US postmaster of Oshkosh by the administration of Democratic President James K. Polk in that same year, serving until 1849 in the patronage position. The administration and patronage appointments changed after election in 1848 of Whig Zachary Taylor as President of the United States.

In February 1847, Eastman, Miller and other locals were authorized by the Wisconsin territorial legislature to form a company to build a bridge across the Fox River "at Miller's Ferry" in Oshkosh. On January 12, 1848, Eastman was appointed as the first clerk of court for the Winnebago County circuit court.

== Elected office ==
With the breakdown of the Second Party System in American politics, Eastman (who had been a Democrat in Vermont and Wisconsin Territory) became active in the "Union Democratic Party" movement. It eventually merged with the Free Soil Party.

In 1850, he was elected to the Winnebago County seat in the Wisconsin Assembly, succeeding Democrat Leonard P. Crary, as a Free Soiler. (The party affiliation was still fluid: at least one Democratic newspaper described him as a Democrat, and listed him on their Democratic ticket with former Governor James Duane Doty, who was running as an Independent Democrat.) In the 1851 election Dudley Blodget, a Whig, succeeded Eastman in this legislative district. (Crary and Blodget were both also from the city of Oshkosh.)

In 1853, the new Democratic President Franklin Pierce appointed Eastman again as US Postmaster of Oshkosh. Also in 1853, Eastman supported the incorporation of the City of Oshkosh, formerly part of the Town of Oshkosh. He was elected as the first mayor of the new city (on a combined Democratic and Independent ticket). In later years Eastman was elected as an alderman to the city council. In 1856, he lost the mayoral election (running as a Democrat) by one vote, 318 votes to the winning 319 votes for Thomas A. Follett.

== Later life ==
In the summer of 1851, following the end of the legislative session, Eastman opened a bookstore and stationery store in Oshkosh. Eastman also continued to serve as Postmaster until 1861, when the newly elected Republican administration of Abraham Lincoln took office and made its own appointments.

Eastman was among the city's best-known businessmen. He was chosen for the board of directors of both of the railroad companies organized in Oshkosh in 1853: the Oshkosh & Portage City, and the Winnebago. In 1854, he joined such figures as James Duane Doty, Mason Darling, Theodore Conkey and his old partner Lucas Miller as a director of the newly re-organized Wisconsin Farmers' Insurance Company.

Eastman died February 23, 1870, at the age of 64 years and one day. He is buried in Riverside Cemetery in Oshkosh. He was survived by his second wife, Catherine (Granger) Eastman, who lived until June 18, 1897.

== See also ==
- List of mayors of Oshkosh, Wisconsin

Wisconsin State Assembly
Preceded by Leonard P. Crary	Member of the Wisconsin State Assembly from the Winnebago County district January 6, 1851 – January 5, 1852	Succeeded by Dudley Blodget (Winnebago–Waupaca)
Political offices
City incorporated	Mayor of Oshkosh, Wisconsin; April 1853 – April 1854	Succeeded by Joseph Jackson
