= John Fitzgerald (Wisconsin politician) =

American banker and politician (c. 1827 – 1863)

7th Mayor of Oshkosh, Wisconsin
- In office April 1861 – April 1862
- Preceded by: Benjamin S. Henning
- Succeeded by: Henry C. Jewell

Member of the Wisconsin Senate from the 21st district
- In office January 7, 1856 – January 5, 1857
- Preceded by: Coles Bashford
- Succeeded by: Edwin Wheeler

Personal details
- Born: c. 1827
- Died: January 31, 1863 (aged 35–36) St. Nicholas Hotel, New York, New York, U.S.
- Cause of death: Suicide
- Resting place: Riverside Cemetery, Oshkosh, Wisconsin
- Party: Democratic
- Spouse: Mary Doty (died 1905)
- Children: 2
- Relatives: James Duane Doty (father-in-law)
- Occupation: banker, politician

John Glen Fitzgerald (c. 1827 – January 31, 1863) was an American businessman, Democratic politician, and Wisconsin pioneer. He was the 7th mayor of Oshkosh (1861), and represented Winnebago County for one year in the Wisconsin Senate (1856).

== Biography ==
Fitzgerald was of Irish American descent, and was a prominent citizen of Oshkosh, Wisconsin, in the 1850s and early 1860s. In the early 1850s, he, along with his partner, B. F. Moore, grew to monopolize the entire steamboat fleet on Lake Winnebago and the Fox and Wolf rivers. From that, he branched into finance in 1854, when he established a commodity exchange at Oshkosh. Around this time, he married Mary Doty, the daughter of Congressman James Duane Doty, an influential Wisconsin Democrat and former governor of the Wisconsin Territory. In 1855, Fitzgerald bought out his partner, Moore, and became the sole proprietor of the Lake Winnebago Steamboat Co., operating five boats. Fitzgerald was also said to have put the steamboats on a more regular schedule and system, earning substantial profits in the process.

Also in 1855, with Winnebago County's state senator, Coles Bashford, running for Governor of Wisconsin, Fitzgerald was put up as the Democratic candidate to fill the remainder of Bashford's term in the Wisconsin State Senate. Fitzgerald served in the 1856 session of the Legislature, but did not run for re-election. Instead he focused on his growing business, purchasing a stake in Oshkosh's first banking partnership, then known as Darling, Wright, & Kellogg, which would become known as Kellogg, Fitzgerald & Co., and organized under the new state banking law. After Fitzgerald's death, the bank would become the First National Bank of Oshkosh.

In 1861, Fitzgerald was elected Mayor of Oshkosh. Wisconsin received word of the Battle of Fort Sumter during his first month in office; Fitzgerald immediately called a war meeting in the city, where the first company of Oshkosh volunteers were raised for service in the American Civil War—the Oshkosh volunteers became Company E of the 2nd Wisconsin Infantry Regiment.

Fitzgerald became a major financial backer of Democratic candidates in the late 1850s, and was said to be the top funder of state Democrats in 1860. He sought the Democratic nomination for Wisconsin's 3rd congressional district in 1860, opposing the renomination of incumbent Charles H. Larrabee, but was unsuccessful in his attempt. In 1862, however, he received the support of the Democratic district convention over Colonel Gabriel Bouck for nomination in the new 5th congressional district. Fitzgerald's nomination was enthusiastically endorsed by Democratic papers in the state, such as the Appleton Crescent, but he ultimately declined the honor, stating that he intended to reside in New York City indefinitely.

== Death ==
Fitzgerald was apparently an extremely successful businessman; according to contemporary accounts, his estate was worth approximately $500,000 at the time of his death, which would be about $10.5 million adjusted for inflation to 2020. But, he also suffered severe mental illness and was known to remark that he believed he would be committed to an asylum. He told friends that he would kill himself if he thought that he would be sent to such a facility. In 1862, he traveled east to New York City to establish a new business in that city. He fell ill with diarrhea and spent several days under medical care at New York's Fifth Avenue Hotel. He then relocated to the nearby St. Nicholas Hotel. On Friday, January 30, he authorized his traveling companion, Mr. Ames, to purchase the $50,000 worth of goods he was seeking in the city. Just after midnight that evening, Fitzgerald apparently wrote eight letters to his wife, friends, and business partners, and killed himself with a pistol. The Wisconsin State Journal also speculated that alcoholism may have played a role in his suicide.

== Personal life and family ==
Fitzgerald was married to Mary Doty, the daughter of former Wisconsin Territory governor James Duane Doty. They had at least two children together, though one died in infancy.

== See also ==
- List of mayors of Oshkosh, Wisconsin

Wisconsin Senate
Preceded by Coles Bashford	Member of the Wisconsin Senate from the 21st district January 7, 1856 – January 5, 1857	Succeeded by Edwin Wheeler
Political offices
Preceded by Benjamin S. Henning	Mayor of Oshkosh, Wisconsin; April 1861 – April 1862	Succeeded by Henry C. Jewell
