= Carlton Foster =

19th century American politician

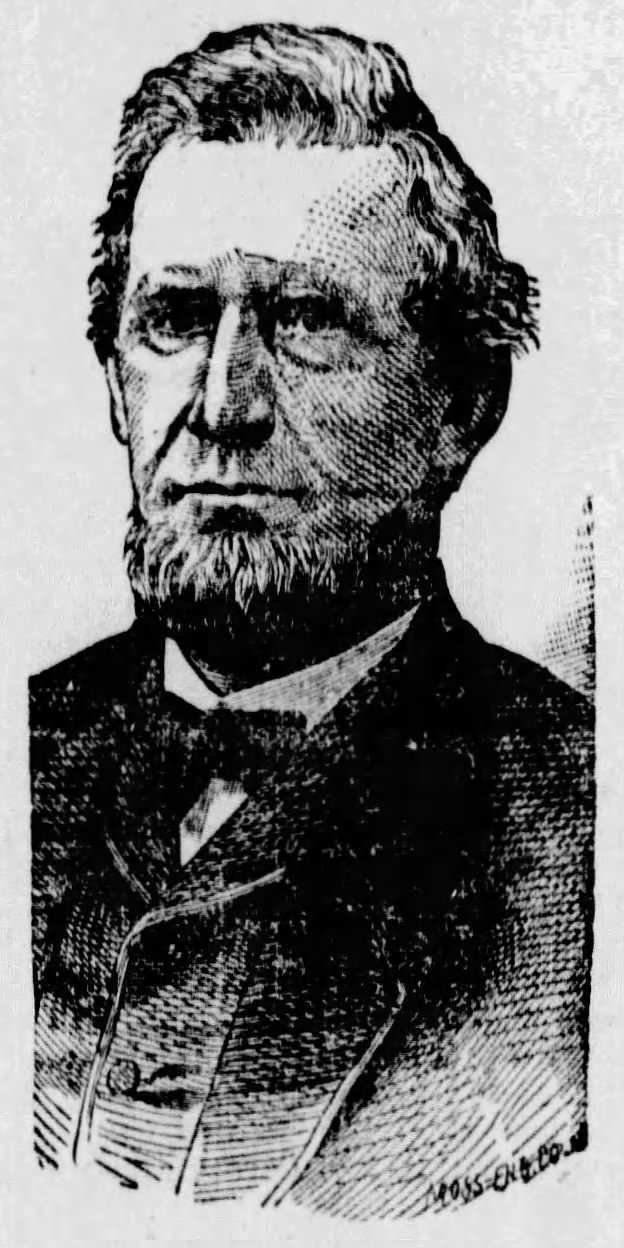
- From his obituary in Oshkosh Northwestern, Aug. 5, 1901

10th & 25th Mayor of Oshkosh, Wisconsin
- In office April 1886 – April 1887
- Preceded by: Andrew Haben
- Succeeded by: H. B. Dale
- In office April 1865 – April 1867
- Preceded by: Philetus Sawyer
- Succeeded by: Joseph H. Porter

Member of the Wisconsin State Assembly from the Winnebago 3rd district
- In office January 1, 1883 – January 5, 1885
- Preceded by: George H. Buckstaff
- Succeeded by: Frank Challoner
- In office January 6, 1873 – January 4, 1875
- Preceded by: Nelson F. Beckwith
- Succeeded by: Leroy S. Chase

Personal details
- Born: August 26, 1826 Essex County, New York, U.S.
- Died: August 4, 1901 (aged 74) Oshkosh Yacht Club, Oshkosh, Wisconsin, U.S.
- Cause of death: Heart disease
- Resting place: Riverside Cemetery, Oshkosh, Wisconsin
- Party: Republican
- Spouse: Sibyl S. Storrs (m. 1854–1901)
- Children: Jessie Foster^{(died 1866)}; George H. Foster^{(b. 1862; died 1915)}; Anna F. (Loper)^{(b. 1863; died 1930)}

Carlton Foster (August 26, 1826 – August 4, 1901) was an American businessman, Republican politician, and Wisconsin pioneer. He was the 10th and 25th mayor of Oshkosh, Wisconsin, and served three terms in the Wisconsin State Assembly.

== Biography ==
Carlton Foster was born in Essex County, New York, in August 1826. He was raised on his father's farm and educated in the public schools of Essex and Clinton counties. At age 20, he went to work as an apprentice millwright, and would remain in that profession for over a decade.

He moved to Oshkosh, Wisconsin, in September 1855, and made the city his primary residence for the rest of his life. In 1859, he entered the lumber business and soon became regarded as one of the leading lumbermen in the city. In 1870, he built a factory under the firm name Carlton Foster & Co., which became a major manufacturer for sashes, doors, and blinds. Foster remained president of this company until his death.

Through his business activity, Foster became involved in local politics as a member of the Republican Party of Wisconsin. He was elected mayor of Oshkosh in 1865, and was re-elected in 1866. He was elected to the Wisconsin State Assembly in 1872, 1873, and 1882. His last campaign for office was in 1886, when he was elected to his third and final term as mayor, defeating incumbent Democrat Andrew Haben.

About May 1, 1901, Foster became severely ill and his health remained fragile after the acute illness passed. In June, he decided to live full-time aboard his beloved steam yacht, the Anna M., believing that the fresh air on the lake and river would improve his health. His family went to live with him on the boat, but his health continued to deteriorate. They steamed back to Oshkosh and docked at the Oshkosh Yacht Club, where medical assistance could be brought onboard. Foster died aboard his boat on August 4, 1901.

== Personal life and family ==
Carlton Foster married Sibyl S. Storrs of Vermont on June 20, 1854. They had at least three children, though one died in childhood. Their son, Charles H. Foster served on the Oshkosh city council and the city police and fire board.

== Electoral history ==
=== Wisconsin Assembly (1872, 1873) ===
Wisconsin Assembly, Winnebago 3rd District Election, 1872
Party	Candidate	Votes	%	±%
General Election, November 5, 1872
Republican	Carlton Foster	975	64.06%	−14.45%
Democratic	Ellis Thompson	547	35.94%	
Plurality		428	28.12%	
Total votes		1,522	100.0%	+46.91%
Republican gain from Democratic				

Wisconsin Assembly, Winnebago 3rd District Election, 1873
Party	Candidate	Votes	%	±%
General Election, November 4, 1873
Republican	Carlton Foster (incumbent)	651	100.0%	
Plurality		651	100.0%	
Total votes		651	100.0%	-57.23%
Republican hold				

=== Wisconsin Assembly (1882) ===
Wisconsin Assembly, Winnebago 3rd District Election, 1882
Party	Candidate	Votes	%	±%
General Election, November 7, 1882
Republican	Carlton Foster	991	40.22%	
Democratic	Joseph Klockner	964	39.12%	
Prohibition	Andrew Sutherland	509	20.66%	
Plurality		27	1.10%	
Total votes		2,464	100.0%	
Republican hold				

=== Oshkosh Mayor (1886) ===
Oshkosh, Wisconsin, Mayoral Election, 1886
Party	Candidate	Votes	%	±%
General Election, April 6, 1886
Republican	Carlton Foster	2,054	55.45%	
Democratic	Andrew Haben (incumbent)	1,572	42.44%	
Prohibition	George W. Gates	78	2.11%	
Plurality		482	13.01%	
Total votes		3,704	100.0%	
Republican gain from Democratic				

== See also ==
- List of mayors of Oshkosh, Wisconsin

Wisconsin State Assembly
Preceded by Nelson F. Beckwith	Member of the Wisconsin State Assembly from the Winnebago 3rd district January 6, 1873 – January 4, 1875	Succeeded by Leroy S. Chase
Preceded by George H. Buckstaff	Member of the Wisconsin State Assembly from the Winnebago 3rd district January 1, 1883 – January 5, 1885	Succeeded by Frank Challoner
Political offices
Preceded by Philetus Sawyer	Mayor of Oshkosh, Wisconsin; April 1865 – April 1867	Succeeded by Joseph H. Porter
Preceded by Andrew Haben	Mayor of Oshkosh, Wisconsin; April 1886 – April 1887	Succeeded by H. B. Dale
