= Leroy S. Chase =

19th century American politician

Leroy Chase

Member of the Wisconsin State Assembly from the Winnebago 3rd district
- In office January 4, 1875 – January 1, 1877
- Preceded by: Carlton Foster
- Succeeded by: Levi E. Knapp

Personal details
- Born: May 16, 1840 Woodstock, Maine, U.S.
- Died: March 28, 1926 (aged 85) Long Beach, California, U.S.
- Resting place: Angelus-Rosedale Cemetery, Los Angeles, California
- Party: Republican
- Spouse: Eliza Jane
- Children: 2

Military service
- Allegiance: United States
- Branch/service: United States Volunteers; Union Army
- Years of service: 1865
- Rank: Private, USV
- Unit: 46th Reg. Wis. Vol. Infantry
- Battles/wars: American Civil War

Leroy S. Chase (May 16, 1840 – March 28, 1926) was an American farmer, educator, and Republican politician. He was a member of the Wisconsin State Assembly for two terms, representing southeast Winnebago County.

== Biography ==
Chase was born on May 16, 1840, in Woodstock, Maine. During the last year of the American Civil War, he served with the 46th Wisconsin Infantry Regiment of the Union Army.

Chase was a member of the Wisconsin State Assembly during the 1875 and 1876 sessions. Previously, he was Town Supervisor of Omro, Wisconsin, in 1873. He was a Republican.

Chase died on March 28, 1926, in Long Beach, California.

Wisconsin State Assembly
Preceded by Carlton Foster	Member of the Wisconsin State Assembly from the Winnebago 3rd district January 4, 1875 – January 1, 1877	Succeeded by Levi E. Knapp
