= Lucas M. Miller =

19th century American politician

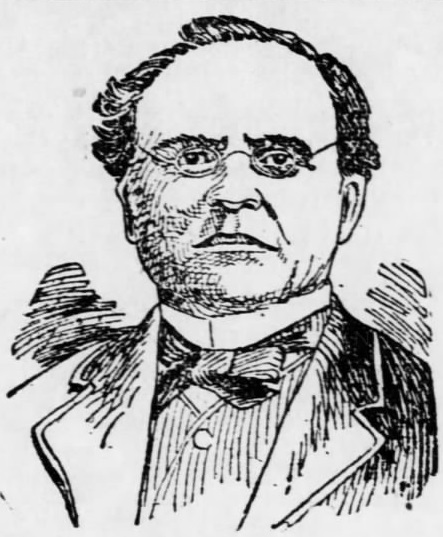

Member of the U.S. House of Representatives from Wisconsin's 6th district
- In office March 4, 1891 – March 3, 1893
- Preceded by: Charles B. Clark
- Succeeded by: Owen A. Wells

Chairman of the Board of Supervisors of Winnebago County, Wisconsin
- In office November 12, 1878 – November 1890
- Preceded by: Henry C. Jewell
- Succeeded by: Charles W. Davis
- In office November 11, 1873 – November 10, 1874
- Preceded by: Milo C. Bushnell
- Succeeded by: E. D. Henry

Member of the Wisconsin State Assembly from the Winnebago 1st district
- In office January 3, 1853 – January 2, 1854
- Preceded by: Dudley Blodget (whole county)
- Succeeded by: George Gary

Personal details
- Born: September 15, 1824 Livadia, First Hellenic Republic
- Died: December 4, 1902 (aged 78) Oshkosh, Wisconsin, U.S.
- Resting place: Riverside Cemetery, Oshkosh
- Party: Democratic
- Spouses: Phedora Cady (died 1854); Mary E. Reeve (m. 1860–1902)
- Children: Barbara (Stelzer) (adopted)
- Parent: Jonathan Peckham Miller (adoptive father)
- Relatives: George Sennott (adoptive brother), Sarah Miller Keith (adoptive sister), Abijah Keith (brother-in-law)

Military service
- Allegiance: United States
- Branch/service: Wisconsin Terr. Militia
- Rank: Colonel

Lucas Miltiades Miller (September 15, 1824 – December 4, 1902) was a Greek American immigrant, lawyer, Democratic politician, and Wisconsin pioneer. He served one term in the U.S. House of Representatives, representing Wisconsin's 6th congressional district during the 52nd Congress. He was the first Greek American member of the U.S. House of Representatives, and was an instrumental figure in the establishment and development of the city of Oshkosh, Wisconsin. He also served thirteen terms as chairman of the board of supervisors of Winnebago County, Wisconsin.

His name was often abbreviated L. M. Miller, and some sources spelled his first name as "Lucius."

== Early life ==
Lucas Miller was born in Livadia, Greece. At the time, this area was the First Hellenic Republic, as Greece was engaged in their War of Independence against the Ottoman Empire. Miller was left an orphan by that war before age 4. His birth name was lost, and so he was given the name "Lucas Miltiades Miller" by his adopted father. (Note: A newspaper article about him in 1890 claimed his birth name was just "Lucas Miltiades", but it's not clear if that was just a misunderstanding. More commonly, his biographies describe that his birth name was unknown.) He was found wandering the streets of an abandoned town shortly after fighting had occurred there, and was adopted by American abolitionist Jonathan Peckham Miller, along with three other Greek orphans. J. P. Miller was a veteran of the War of 1812 and had been inspired to volunteer for the cause of Greek independence, ultimately serving as a colonel in the Greek revolution.

He accompanied his foster father upon his return to the United States and settled in Montpelier, Vermont, in 1828. He attended the common schools until age 16, when he had to begin taking care of his foster father's affairs, due to medical incapacitation. He studied law, obtained his citizenship, and was admitted to the bar.

== Wisconsin pioneer ==
In 1846, he traveled west to the Wisconsin Territory and purchased 500 hundred acres of land in the settlement that would soon become Oshkosh, Wisconsin. Immediately after arriving in Oshkosh, he became an influential voice in the development of the region. He was a leader in the effort to set aside land along the Fox River for development of navigability improvements. He was instrumental in the movement to relocate the county seat of Winnebago County from Butte des Morts to Oshkosh, and began donating pieces of his own land for the construction of county buildings. Ultimately, all of Miller's land became part of the city of Oshkosh, with his central homestead making up what is now the Menominee Park Zoo. He started a law practice in Oshkosh, and operated a general store in partnership with Edward Eastman, a fellow emigrant from Vermont. In the midst of the Mexican–American War, in 1847, Miller was appointed colonel of the Winnebago County militia by governor Henry Dodge; he often utilized the honorific "colonel" for the rest of his life.

== Political career ==
Miller also became active politically with the Democratic Party, but joined the brief offshoot known as the "Union Democratic Party" in the political tumult following the Mexican Cession. He was the Union Democratic nominee for Wisconsin Senate in what was then the 4th Senate district, but was defeated by John A. Eastman, the Regular Democrat or "Hunker" candidate. Miller ultimately returned to the Democratic Party after the Compromise of 1850.

In 1852, he was nominated for Wisconsin State Assembly in Winnebago County's 1st district, which then comprised the southern half of the county, plus Oshkosh. He won the seat and served in the 6th Wisconsin Legislature. During that legislative term, he advocated for allowing the Menominee people to remain in Wisconsin and furthered his plans for Fox River improvements. Also during that term, Miller was appointed by the governor to serve as chairman of the state board of commissioners for public works. He also became invested in the Chicago and North Western Railway, and was elected to the board of directors.

Miller sought the Democratic nomination for Governor of Wisconsin at the 1859 Democratic state convention, but received only 15 of 206 delegate votes in the first round, then fell to just 7 votes in the second round, before withdrawing from the race. The following year, he ran for Wisconsin Senate in the 21st Senate district, but lost the general election to Horace O. Crane.

After the start of the American Civil War, Miller sometimes participated politically with the National Union movement. He sought the Union nomination for state bank comptroller in 1861, but was again defeated at the convention. Later that year, the Democratic convention's first choice for State Treasurer of Wisconsin, Hercules L. Dousman, declined the nomination. They subsequently offered the nomination to Miller, and he accepted. Dousman's name, however, still appeared on several Democratic tickets, and received votes. He went on to lose the general election to the Union nominee, incumbent Samuel D. Hastings.

After the 1861 election, Miller was out of politics for nearly a decade, focusing on his business interests. In 1871, he returned to elected office, running for Winnebago County board of supervisors that spring. After winning that seat, he chose to run for state Assembly again, in Winnebago County's 1st Assembly district. He lost the fall election to Republican Thomas Duncan Grimmer. He won re-election to the county board in 1872 and 1873, and was then chosen chairman of the county board in November 1873. Miller remained on the county board nearly continuously until his election to Congress in 1890. He was elected chairman of the board again in 1878, and was then re-elected each term as chairman for the rest of his years on the board.

== Congress ==
Wisconsin's 6th congressional district 1882–1891

Miller developed a rivalry with fellow Oshkosh Democrat George White Pratt, and in 1890 he was instrumental in the movement to deny Pratt the Democratic nomination for Governor. At the Democratic convention in the 6th congressional district, no one wanted to challenge the incumbent Republican congressman Charles B. Clark. Several delegates initially begged George White Pratt to run, but he adamantly refused. The nomination was then offered to J. W. Hume, who also declined. Finally, the convention voted to nominate L. M. Miller, who was out of town visiting his family in New England. A few days later, Miller telegraphed from Vermont that he would accept the nomination, but did not cut his vacation short to begin campaigning. Wisconsin newspapers still saw Clark as the overwhelming favorite to win re-election. When Miller ultimately returned to Wisconsin, he fell ill while en route and was further delayed. When he finally arrived, in October, he further made it clear he did not intend to take a very active role in the campaign. Nevertheless, Miller's campaign was boosted by the political atmosphere in the state, which had turned decisively against the Republicans due to the recently passed Bennett Law. The law had outraged Wisconsin's large immigrant community, and subsequent comments by the governor exacerbated that concern and inflamed Catholic passions as well. In the end, Miller won the election by 2,100 votes.

After winning the election, there was a brief attempt to question Miller's citizenship status, but he produced papers verifying his naturalization and was allowed to serve in the 52nd Congress. During the term, Miller broke with his party on one of the major economic issues of the era—the tariff. Miller was strongly opposed to eliminating the tariff on cotton, but was ultimately overruled by the Democratic majority.

His most noteworthy action in Congress, was a proposed constitutional amendment to change the country's name to "the United States of the Earth". At the time, he said the name change was necessary because "it is possible for this republic to grow through the admission of new states...until every nation on earth has become part of it."

Wisconsin's 6th congressional district 1892–1901

In the reapportionment after the 1890 United States census, Wisconsin obtained an additional congressional seat, and a redistricting was undertaken. Miller's district was substantially changed, removing Outagamie, Adams, and Columbia counties, and adding Manitowoc, Calumet, and Fond du Lac.

Miller attempted to seek re-election in the new district, but faced strong opposition from local Democratic leadership, who sought to replace him with George White Pratt. The move against Miller created its own backlash; after a long and difficult congressional district convention, Owen A. Wells was nominated instead of either Miller or Pratt. Miller initially seemed poised to run as an independent candidate, but ultimately chose not to run again.

== Later years ==
After leaving office, Miller largely retired from politics. His name was briefly floated as a candidate for Congress again in 1894, but he quickly dismissed the idea. And in 1896, he spoke out against the free silver platform of Democratic nominee William Jennings Bryan. Otherwise, Miller mostly interested himself in local affairs.

Miller died in Oshkosh, Wisconsin, on December 4, 1902, after suffering from kidney disease. He was interred at Oshkosh's Riverside Cemetery.

== Personal life and family ==
Lucas Miller was one of three Greek orphans adopted by Jonathan Peckham Miller, the other two being Anartes Nickolas Miller and Theseus Themistocles Miller. In addition, J. P. Miller had one biological daughter, Sarah, who married Vermont politician Abijah Keith.

Lucas Miller married twice. His first wife was Phedora Cady, daughter of a prominent and successful Vermont tanner. She died in 1854. In 1860, Miller married Mary E. Reeve, the eldest daughter of Oshkosh pioneer banker Thomas Tusten Reeve. Miller had no biological children, but he adopted a daughter with his second wife.

== Electoral history ==
=== Wisconsin Treasurer (1861) ===
Wisconsin State Treasurer Election, 1861
Party	Candidate	Votes	%	±%
General Election, November 5, 1861
National Union	Samuel D. Hastings (incumbent)	55,135	55.73%	+1.25pp
Democratic	Lucas M. Miller	42,858	43.32%	−2.20pp
Democratic	Hercules L. Dousman	865	0.87%	
	Scattering	78	0.08%	
Plurality		12,277	12.41%	+3.45pp
Total votes		98,936	100.0%	−17.68%
Republican hold				

=== U.S. House of Representatives (1890) ===
Wisconsin's 6th Congressional District Election, 1890
Party	Candidate	Votes	%	±%
General Election, November 4, 1890
Democratic	Lucas M. Miller	15,573	51.67%	+10.16pp
Republican	Charles B. Clark (incumbent)	13,409	44.49%	−8.02pp
Prohibition	George W. Gates	1,156	3.84%	+0.23pp
Plurality		2,164	12.41%	−3.81pp
Total votes		30,138	100.0%	−11.97%
Democratic gain from Republican				

== Notes ==
Wisconsin State Assembly
Preceded by Dudley Blodget (whole county)	Member of the Wisconsin State Assembly from the Winnebago 1st district January 3, 1853 – January 2, 1854	Succeeded by George Gary
U.S. House of Representatives
Preceded by Charles B. Clark	Member of the U.S. House of Representatives from Wisconsin's 6th congressional district March 4, 1891 - March 3, 1893	Succeeded by Owen A. Wells
Political offices
Preceded by Milo C. Bushnell	Chairman of the Board of Supervisors of Winnebago County, Wisconsin; November 11, 1873 – November 10, 1874	Succeeded by E. D. Henry
Preceded by Henry C. Jewell	Chairman of the Board of Supervisors of Winnebago County, Wisconsin; November 12, 1878 – November 1890	Succeeded by Charles W. Davis
