= Kenneth Sawyer Goodman =

American playwright

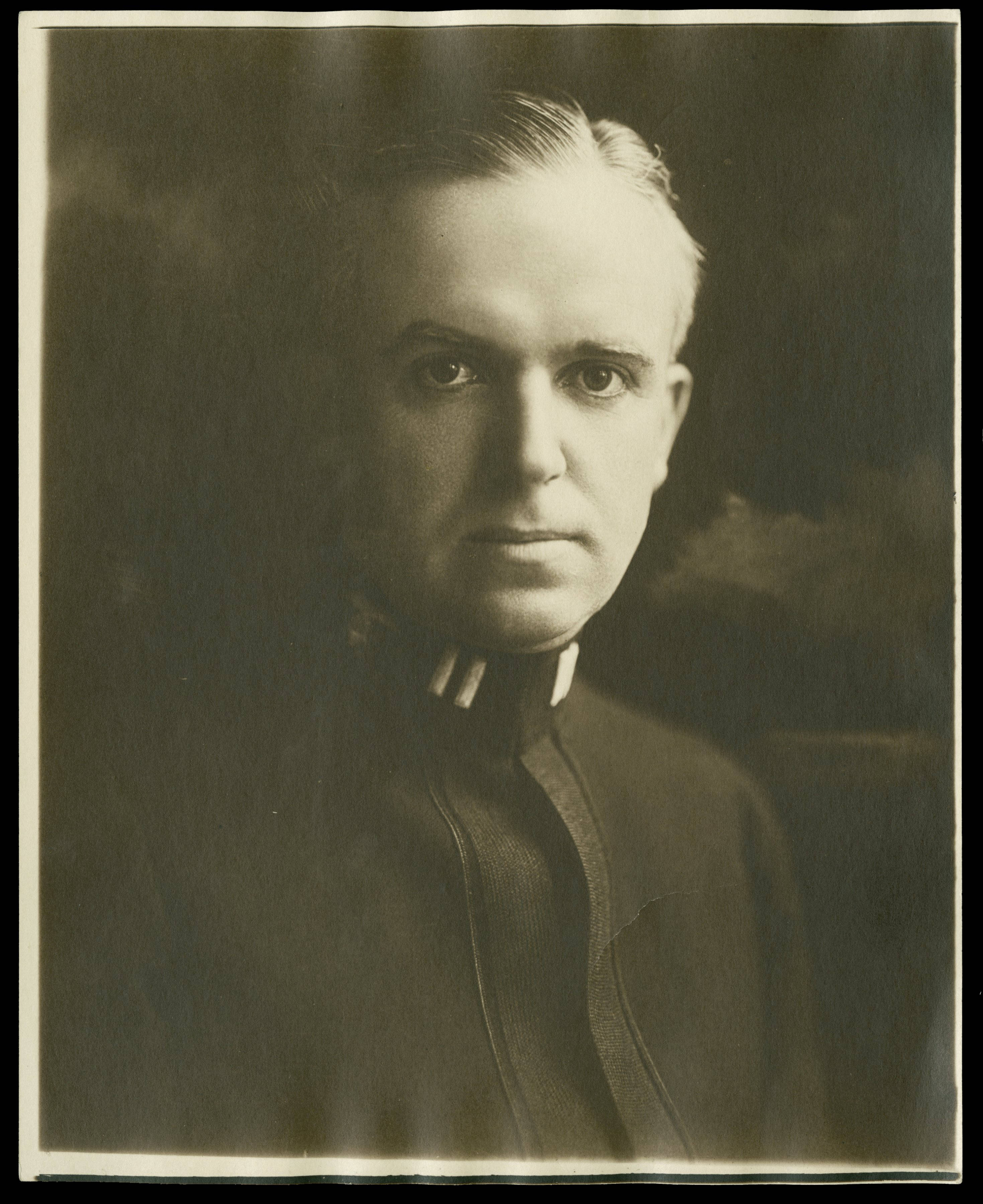
- Goodman in 1918
- Born: September 19, 1883; Chicago, Illinois, U.S.
- Died: November 29, 1918 (aged 35); Chicago, Illinois, U.S.
- Education: Princeton University
- Occupation: Playwright
- Spouse: Marjorie Robbins (m. 1912)
- Children: 2
- Father: William O. Goodman
- Relatives: Philetus Sawyer (grandfather)

Kenneth Sawyer Goodman (September 19, 1883 – November 29, 1918) was an American playwright. Having an interest in the arts typical of Chicago's high society, he went into playwriting and was part of the city's Little Theatre Movement. He wrote numerous plays in separate partnerships with Thomas Wood Stevens and Ben Hecht. Following his death, the Goodman Theatre was formed with Goodman's original plans for a combined professional theater and drama school.

== Biography ==
=== Early life ===
Goodman, an only child, was born in Chicago on September 19, 1883. His parents were Erna Sawyer and lumber businessman William O. Goodman. His maternal grandfather was United States Senator Philetus Sawyer. He was educated at local schools before moving westward to attend The Hill School and Princeton University, where he worked at The Daily Princetonian and the Nassau Literary Review.

Goodman worked in his family business after finishing his time in Princeton, declining an offer to work as an English teacher at his alma mater. He had an interest in the arts typical of Chicago's high society, and he joined the Cliff Dwellers Club in 1910.

=== Career ===
Having been recommended to go into playwriting by Princeton dean Christian Gauss, Goodman ultimately started a career in the art, and joined the 1910s Little Theatre Movement. His creative partnership with Thomas Wood Stevens began with the plays Goya (1910) and The Masque of Quetzal’s Bowl, before moving onto "masques" which Percy MacKaye defined as "actable poem(s) adapted to a special place and occasion for an audience directly cooperating". Goodman and Stevens later became founding members of the Chicago Theatre Society, established in 1911.

After Stevens left Chicago to pursue an academic career outside the state, Goodman became a solo playwright in 1912; his work included Dust of the Road (1913) and The Game of Chess (1913). That same year, he started another playwriting partnership, this time with Ben Hecht; together they wrote eight one-act plays, including The Wonder Hat (1913), The Hero of Santa Maria (1918), and An Idyll of the Shops. The duo would be paid $50 for every play they produced. The duo also wrote several unpublished plays about "immigrant Jewish parent-child relationships gone awry". Through his relationship with Hecht, he connected with the Players' Workshop.

In addition to playwriting, Goodman was active as a theatrical director, actor, and patron.

=== Personal life, death, and legacy ===
Outside of theater, Goodman also served as the volunteer director of the Art Institute of Chicago's prints department. During World War I, he helped recruit naval prospects and fundraised for the war relief. He joined the Navy in May 1917 as a reserve, before becoming aide to William A. Moffett, commander of Naval Station Great Lakes. His naval rank was lieutenant fourth class.

He married Marjorie Robbins, a nonprofit administrator who was treasurer of the Chicago Junior League, in 1912. They had two children. He continued juggling the family business with his work in theater.

Goodman died on November 29, 1918, in his parents' home in Chicago. He had been infected with a cold while visiting Annapolis to attend a football game between the Great Lakes Navy Bluejackets and the Navy Midshipmen, and it became pneumonia. His widow later remarried to James M. Hopkins, chair of the Camel Company board of directors.

In 1925, the Goodman Theatre was formed with Goodman's original plans for a combined professional theater and drama school (where the theater's actors would also be drama teachers) in mind. Hrkach remarked that "Goodman, in his unique capacity as both an artist and a patron of the arts, energized Chicago's little theater movement and encouraged theater as art". Historian Stuart Hecht remarked that his ability to bring "people from different circles together, encouraging collaborative creative effort", meant that the older Hecht found him important to the city's theater scene. His archives and personal papers are primarily stored at the Newberry Library.
