= Thomas Wall (politician) =

American politician (1840–1896)

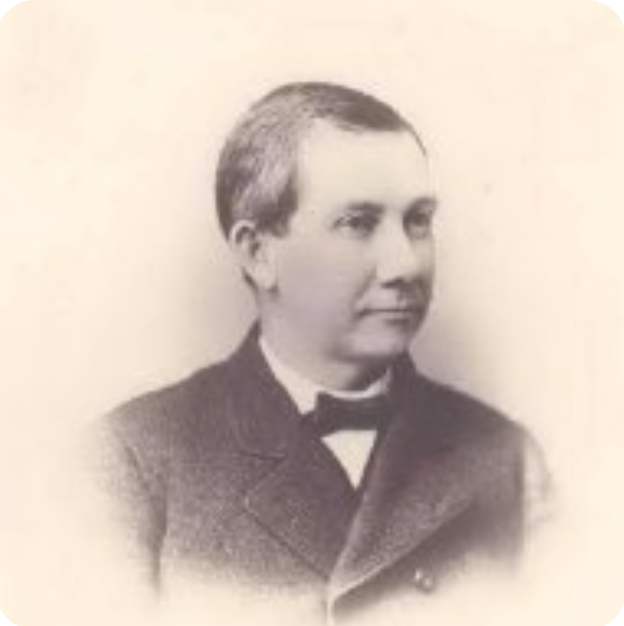
Thomas R. Wall (1840-1896)

Thomas Robert Wall (May 4, 1840 – April 13, 1896) was an American lumberman, banker, farmer and politician.

== Background ==
Born in Lockport, New York May 4, 1840, Wall received a public school education.

Wall moved to Oshkosh, Wisconsin in 1855 with his brother William, and worked for ten years as a clerk on the steamboat Berlin City which ran between Oshkosh and Green Bay. He was married to Sophronia Adams on November 30, 1864; the couple would have two sons. He became rich with successful investments in Northern timberlands, eventually owning the Wall-Spalding Lumber Company (a firm so large that it once owned its own railroad), Winneconne Lumber Company, and the Torrey Cedar Company; and served as a director of the Commercial Bank of Oshkosh.

== Public office ==
A Democrat, Wall was elected an alderman of the City of Oshkosh in 1870, and re-elected in 1872. That year, he was first elected to the Wisconsin State Assembly's 1873 session for the 1st Winnebago County Assembly district (the Towns of Oshkosh and Vinland, and the 1st, 2d, 4th and 5th Wards of the City of Oshkosh), with l,221 votes, to 998 for Republican former Assemblyman Henry C. Jewell. He was assigned to the standing committees on ways and means, and on insurance, banks and banking. He was not a candidate for re-election in 1873, and was succeeded by fellow Democrat Gabriel Bouck. In 1875 he again won the 1st District, with 1,227 votes to 671 for Republican H. B. Jackson and 42 for Independent H. B. Knapp (Democratic incumbent Asa Rogers was not a candidate). He returned to the committee on insurance, banks and banking, and was also on the joint committee on apportionment. At this time, he listed his occupation as "farmer"; He was re-elected in 1876, with 1,606 votes to 1,211 for Republican J. N. Roby. He was not a candidate for re-election in 1877, and was succeeded by Republican James V. Jones. In 1882, he was elected to Wisconsin's 19th State Senate district (Winnebago County) with 3,833 votes to 2,772 for Republican Charles B. Clark, 779 for Prohibitionist Charles Vesey, former and 104 for former Republican-turned-Greenbacker Assemblyman David R. Bean. He was assigned to the committee on town and county organizations; and once again listed his occupation as "lumberman". He was not a candidate in 1884, and was succeeded by Republican George H. Buckstaff.

== Later years ==
He died of a sudden stroke on April 13, 1896 while in Milwaukee on a business trip.
