= William O. Goodman =

American businessman and philanthropist (1848–1936)

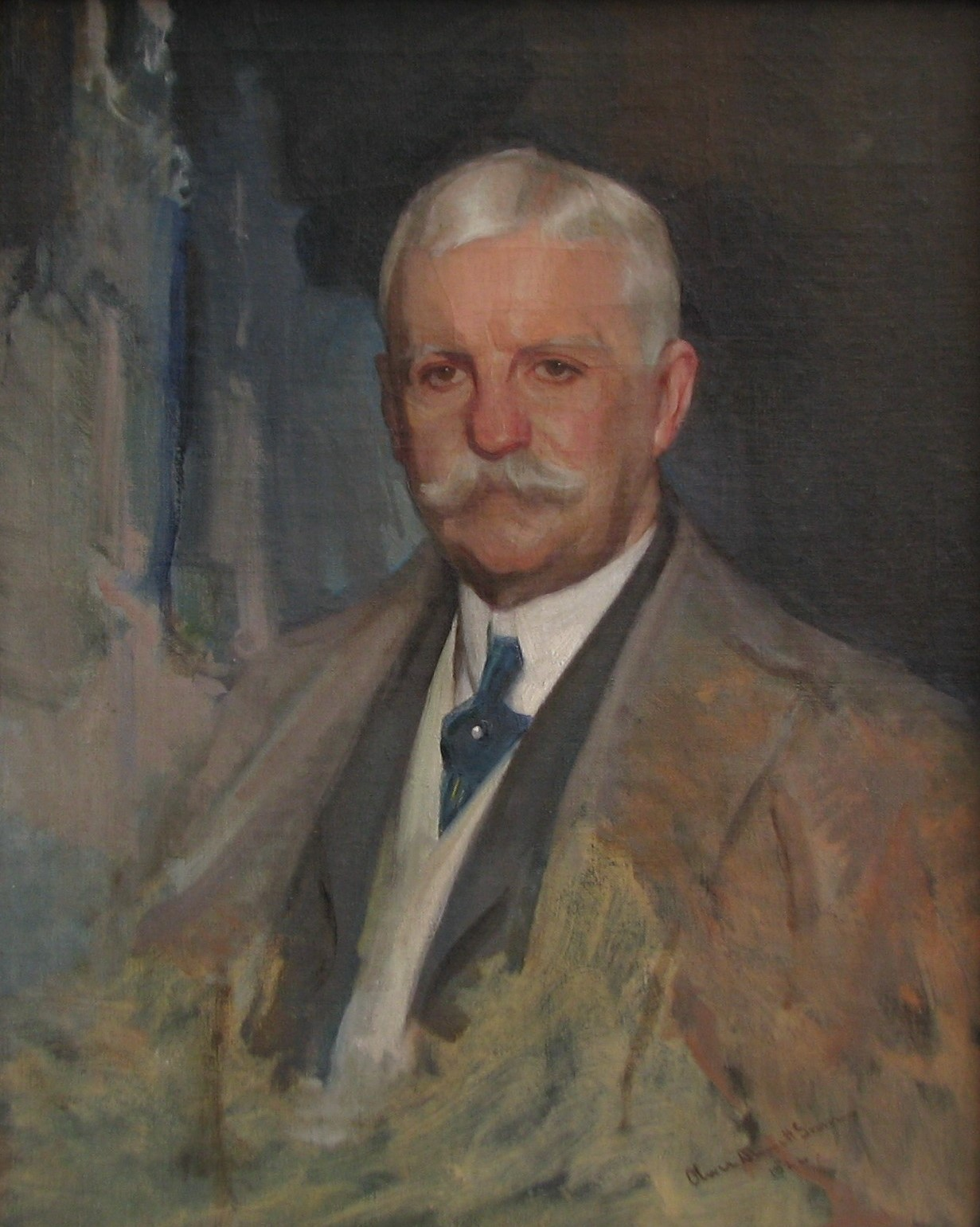
- Portrait of Goodman by Oliver Dennett Grover.
- Born: September 24, 1848; Wellsboro, Pennsylvania, U.S.
- Died: March 22, 1936 (aged 87); Chicago, Illinois, U.S.
- Resting place: Graceland Cemetery, Chicago
- Known for: Goodman Theatre
- Spouse: Erna Sawyer (m. 1878–1936)
- Children: Kenneth Sawyer Goodman
- Relatives: Philetus Sawyer (father-in-law)

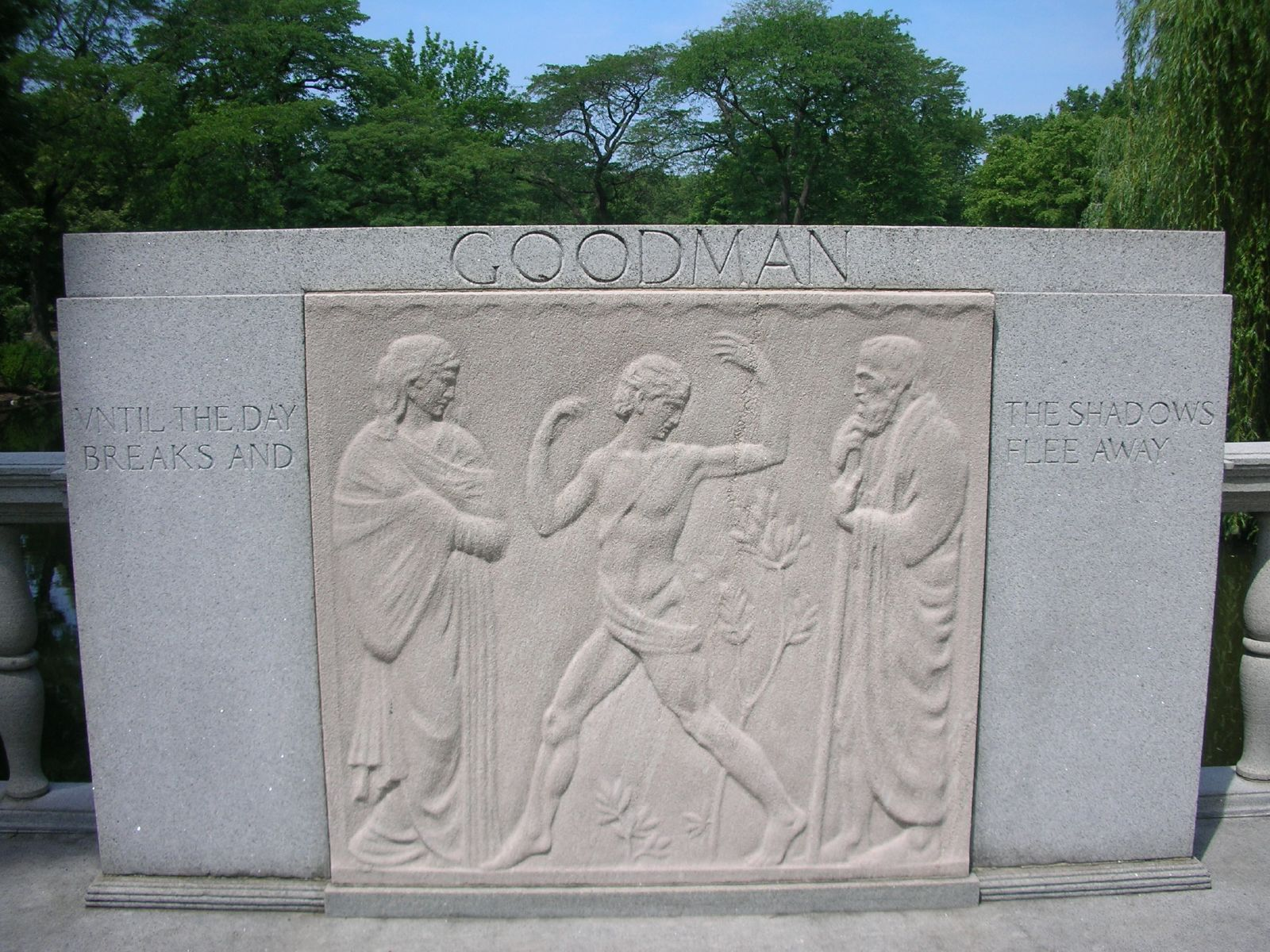
Goodman tomb near the shore of Lake Willowmere.

William Owen Goodman (September 24, 1848 – March 22, 1936) was an American lumber tycoon.

Goodman was born in Wellsboro, Pennsylvania, to Owen and Susan (Barber) Goodman in 1848. His parents died at an early age and he was raised by various members of his family living in different areas throughout Pennsylvania, such as Columbia and Athens. He moved to Chicago at the age of 20 in 1868. He first worked as a bookkeeper and then a salesman for the Menominee River Lumber Company. He soon began investing in lumber on his own.

In 1878 he married Erna Sawyer, the daughter of U.S. representative (later U.S. senator) Philetus Sawyer, who had also made his wealth in the lumber industry and was one of the major stakeholders in the Menominee River Lumber Company, where Goodman had previously been employed. Goodman went on to form a business partnership with Sawyer and his son Edgar, known as the Sawyer-Goodman Company, of which Goodman eventually became president.

Goodman is famous for helping to found the Goodman Theatre through a gift of $250,000 made to Art Institute of Chicago. The donation was made in memory of his son Kenneth Sawyer Goodman, a playwright who died at the age of 35 during the 1918 flu pandemic while serving as a lieutenant at the Great Lakes Naval Station. His son had written and produced a number of different plays throughout Chicago and had envisioned a theater which embraced the best professional training and performance standards.

He is also notable for employing architect Howard Van Doren Shaw to build both a tomb memorializing his son as well as his expansive mansion in the Gold Coast District. Goodman died on March 22, 1936, at age 87 at his residence, 1355 N Astor Street. The mansion was given Chicago Landmark status in 1975 by then mayor Richard J. Daley.
