= Gabriel Bouck =

19th century American congressman and lawyer

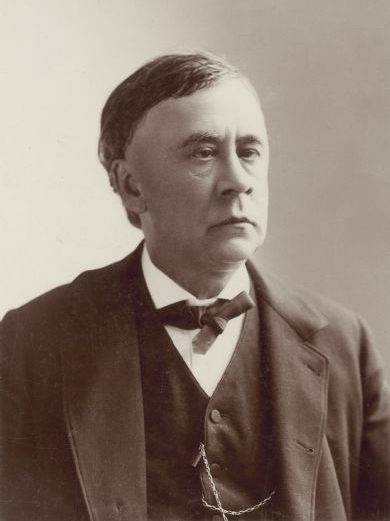

Member of the U.S. House of Representatives from Wisconsin's 6th district
- In office March 4, 1877 – March 3, 1881
- Preceded by: Alanson M. Kimball
- Succeeded by: Richard W. Guenther

6th Attorney General of Wisconsin
- In office January 1, 1858 – January 1, 1860
- Governor: Alexander Randall
- Preceded by: William Rudolph Smith
- Succeeded by: James Henry Howe

24th Speaker of the Wisconsin Assembly
- In office January 14, 1874 – January 13, 1875
- Preceded by: Henry D. Barron
- Succeeded by: Frederick W. Horn

Member of the Wisconsin State Assembly from the Winnebago 1st district
- In office January 1, 1874 – January 1, 1875
- Preceded by: Thomas Wall
- Succeeded by: Asa Rogers
- In office January 1, 1860 – January 1, 1861
- Preceded by: Richard P. Eighme
- Succeeded by: Philetus Sawyer

Personal details
- Born: December 16, 1828 Fultonham, New York, U.S.
- Died: February 21, 1904 (aged 75) Oshkosh, Wisconsin, U.S.
- Resting place: Riverside Cemetery; Oshkosh, Wisconsin, U.S.
- Party: Democratic
- Parents: William C. Bouck (father); Catherine Lawyer (mother)
- Relatives: Joseph Bouck (uncle)
- Education: Union College
- Profession: lawyer, politician

Military service
- Allegiance: United States
- Branch/service: United States Volunteers; Union Army
- Years of service: 1861–1864
- Rank: Colonel, USV
- Commands: 18th Reg. Wis. Vol. Infantry
- Battles/wars: American Civil War: Manassas campaign; First Battle of Bull Run; Second Battle of Corinth; Vicksburg campaign; Battle of Port Gibson; Battle of Champion Hill; Siege of Vicksburg

Gabriel Bouck (December 16, 1828 – February 21, 1904) was an American lawyer, Democratic politician, and Wisconsin pioneer. He represented Wisconsin in the United States House of Representatives for two terms. He also served as Wisconsin's 6th Attorney General and was the 24th speaker of the Wisconsin State Assembly. During the American Civil War he served as a Union Army officer.

== Early life and family ==
He was born in Fultonham, Schoharie County, New York, the fourth of eight children of William C. Bouck and Catherine Lawyer. Bouck lived at Bouck's Island. His siblings were James Madison; Joseph William, born on October 27, 1809; Christian, born on May 14, 1818; Charles, born on September 9, 1829; Catherine, born on July 11, 1820, married Erskine Danforth; Caroline, married Dr. Volney Danforth; and Anna, born on December 29, 1814, married Lyman Sanford.

His father, William C. Bouck, was elected Governor of New York in 1842 and his uncle, Joseph Bouck, was elected to the House of Representatives from the state of New York serving in the 22nd United States Congress from 1831 to 1833.

Gabriel Bouck prepared for college at Schoharie Academy and The Albany Academy. In 1847, he graduated from Union College with Phi Beta Kappa honors and membership in the Kappa Alpha Society. He studied law in the Binghamton, New York, offices of Daniel S. Dickinson. Bouck moved to Milwaukee, Wisconsin, in 1848, where he attained admission to the bar. In 1849, he moved to Oshkosh, in Winnebago County, Wisconsin, to practice law. The 1860 Census listed him as a resident of Oshkosh's third ward.

== Military service ==
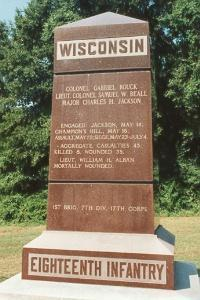
Monument to the 18th Wisconsin Volunteer Infantry commanded by Col. Gabriel Bouck

Gabriel served in the Union Army during the American Civil War. In the first month of the war, he helped to raise Company E of the 2nd Wisconsin Infantry Regiment with volunteers from Oshkosh, and was chosen to serve as captain of that company. This unit was a part of the famous Iron Brigade attached to the Army of the Potomac.

After a year with the 2nd Wisconsin, he accepted a promotion to colonel of the 18th Wisconsin Infantry on April 29, 1862, succeeding Colonel James S. Alban—who had been killed at the Battle of Shiloh. It was with some reluctance that Bouck accepted this assignment when it was offered by Governor Alexander Randall; he was strongly encouraged to do so by fellow Wisconsin officer Edward S. Bragg. Bouck led the 18th Wisconsin through two years of campaigning in the western theater of the war, serving in the Army of the Tennessee under Ulysses S. Grant and William Tecumseh Sherman. He resigned from service on January 4, 1864, and returned to Oshkosh.

Following the war, he stayed active in military endeavors, founding two Grand Army of the Republic (G.A.R.) posts. He also formed the 2nd Company of the Wisconsin National Guard on March 25, 1876, serving as its captain.

== Political career ==
Bouck was an active and loyal member of the Democratic Party, and was elected on the Democratic ticket as Attorney General of Wisconsin serving from 1858 to 1860. He also served two terms in the Wisconsin State Assembly, in 1860 and 1874, serving the last year as speaker. He was a delegate to the Democratic National Conventions of 1868 and 1872.

Bouck was defeated in his first run for the United States Congress, in 1874, but in 1876 was elected to the United States House of Representatives, receiving 20,623 votes to his Republican opponent, Alanson M. Kimball's 17,847. He served in the 45th United States Congress, representing Wisconsin's 6th congressional district and was reelected to the 46th Congress as well. His greatest political ambition was to be elected Governor of Wisconsin, the same office held by his father in the state of New York. He was defeated for reelection to the 47th Congress in 1880 by Republican Richard Guenther.

== Death ==
He resumed his law practice in Oshkosh and for many years was head of Bouck & Hilton Attorneys at Law. After four months of being confined to his room at the Athearn Hotel in Oshkosh, he died there on Sunday morning at 2:45 a.m., February 21, 1904. According to his obituary, death was the result of general debility due to old age. He was 76 years old. His funeral was held at the Masonic Temple of Oshkosh Lodge No. 27. and he is buried in Oshkosh.

== Electoral history ==
=== Wisconsin Attorney General (1857) ===
Wisconsin Attorney General Election, 1857
Party	Candidate	Votes	%	±%
General Election, November 3, 1857
Democratic	Gabriel Bouck	44,764	50.23%	−1.00%
Republican	Mortimer M. Jackson	44,362	49.77%	
Plurality		402	0.45%	-1.99%
Total votes		89,126	100.0%	+22.35%
Democratic hold				

=== U.S. House of Representatives (1874, 1876, 1878, 1880) ===
Wisconsin's 6th Congressional District Election, 1874
Party	Candidate	Votes	%	±%
General Election, November 3, 1874
Republican	Alanson M. Kimball (incumbent)	14,783	50.24%	
Democratic	Gabriel Bouck	14,641	49.76%	
Total votes		29,424	100.0%	
Republican hold				

Wisconsin's 6th Congressional District Election, 1876
Party	Candidate	Votes	%	±%
General Election, November 7, 1876
Democratic	Gabriel Bouck	20,623	53.61%	+3.85%
Republican	Alanson M. Kimball (incumbent)	17,847	46.39%	
Total votes		38,470	100.0%	+30.74%
Democratic gain from Republican				

Wisconsin's 6th Congressional District Election, 1878
Party	Candidate	Votes	%	±%
General Election, November 5, 1878
Democratic	Gabriel Bouck (incumbent)	14,349	45.93%	−7.68%
Republican	James V. Jones	11,748	37.60%	−8.79%
Greenback	G. M. Steele	5,144	16.47%	
Total votes		31,241	100.0%	-18.79%
Democratic hold				

Wisconsin's 6th Congressional District Election, 1880
Party	Candidate	Votes	%	±%
General Election, November 2, 1880
Republican	Richard W. Guenther	20,168	52.50%	+14.90%
Democratic	Gabriel Bouck (incumbent)	16,807	43.75%	−2.18%
Greenback	L. A. Stewart	1,437	3.74%	−12.72%
Total votes		38,412	100.0%	+22.95%
Republican gain from Democratic				

== Sources ==
- United States Congress. "Gabriel Bouck (id: B000658)". Biographical Directory of the United States Congress.
- Gabriel Bouck Photo & Bio – Oshkosh Public Museum
- Gabriel Bouck Obituary – New York Times
- Gabriel Bouck Obituary – The Stevens Point Journal, Stevens Point, WI
- Excerpt from "History of the Fox River Valley Lake Winnebago and the Green Bay Region"; Hon. William A. Titus, Editor
- Oshkosh Daily Northwestern via the Wisconsin Historical Society
- Benjamin Perley Poore (1878). The Political Register and Congressional Directory. Houghton, Osgood and Company. p. 483. "gabriel bouck."

Military offices
Preceded by James S. Alban	Command of the 18th Wisconsin Infantry Regiment; April 29, 1862 – January 4, 1864	Succeeded by Charles H. Jackson
Party political offices
Preceded by William Rudolph Smith	Democratic nominee for Attorney General of Wisconsin; 1857	Succeeded by Samuel Crawford
Wisconsin State Assembly
Preceded by Richard P. Eighme	Member of the Wisconsin State Assembly from the Winnebago 1st district January 1, 1860 – January 1, 1861	Succeeded by Philetus Sawyer
Preceded by Thomas Wall	Member of the Wisconsin State Assembly from the Winnebago 1st district January 1, 1874 – January 1, 1875	Succeeded by Asa Rogers
Preceded by Henry D. Barron	Speaker of the Wisconsin State Assembly; January 14, 1874 – January 13, 1875	Succeeded by Frederick W. Horn
U.S. House of Representatives
Preceded by Alanson M. Kimball	Member of the U.S. House of Representatives from Wisconsin's 6th congressional district March 4, 1877 – March 3, 1881	Succeeded by Richard W. Guenther
Legal offices
Preceded by William Rudolph Smith	Attorney General of Wisconsin; January 1, 1858 – January 1, 1860	Succeeded by James Henry Howe
