= Goodman Theatre =

Professional theater company located in Chicago

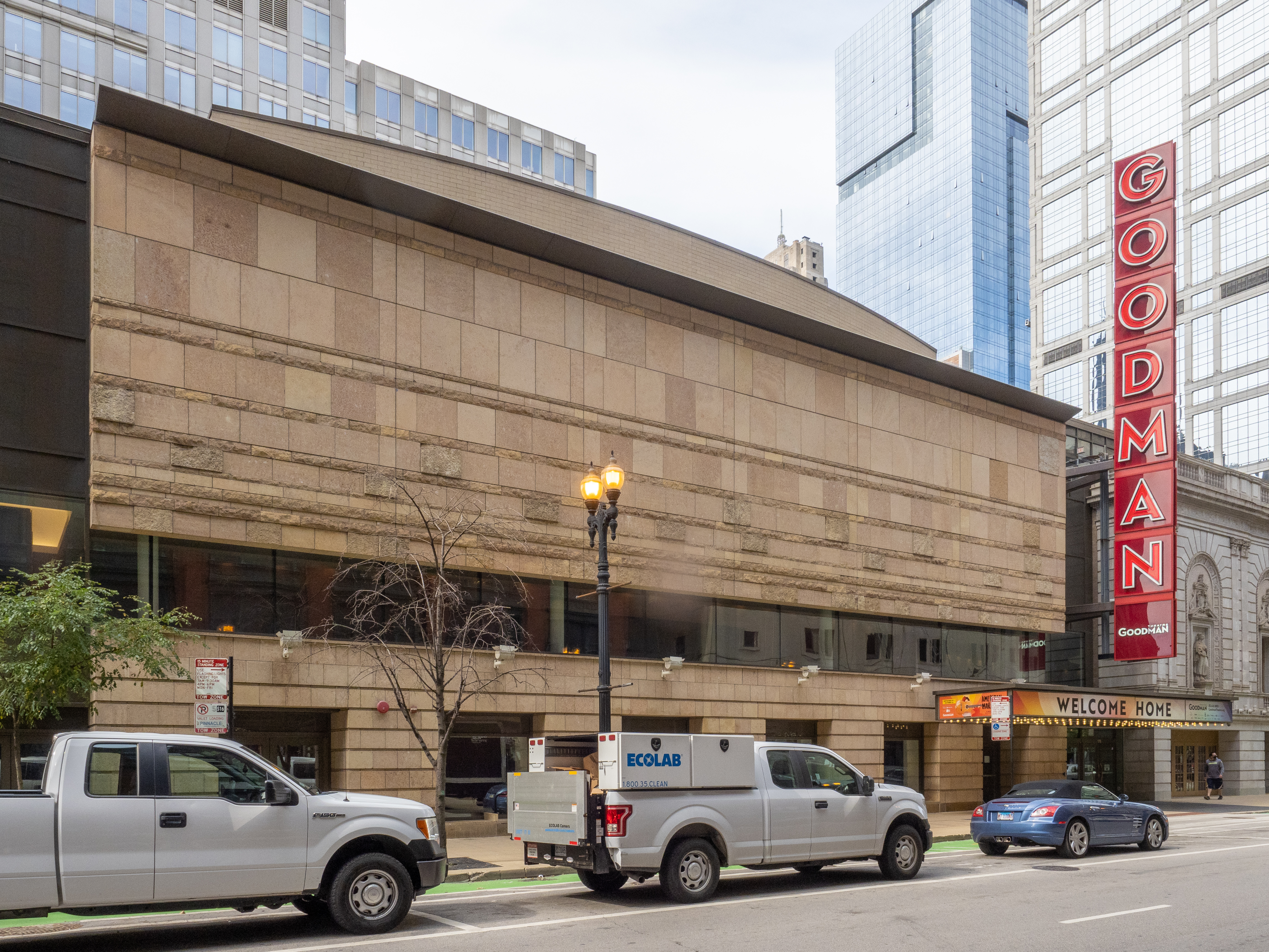
- The Goodman Theatre
- Interactive map of Goodman Theatre
- Location: 170 North Dearborn Street Chicago, Illinois 60601
- Coordinates: 41.8848°N 87.6299°W

Goodman Theatre is a professional theater company located in Chicago's Loop. A major part of the Chicago theatre scene, it is the city's oldest active nonprofit theater organization. Part of its theater complex occupies the landmark Harris and Selwyn Theaters property.

== History ==
=== Founding and early years (1925–1956) ===
The Goodman was founded in 1925 as a tribute to the Chicago playwright Kenneth Sawyer Goodman, who died in the Great Influenza Pandemic in 1918. The theater was funded by Goodman's parents, William O. and Erna Goodman, who donated $250,000 to The Art Institute of Chicago to establish a professional repertory company and a school of drama at the School of the Art Institute of Chicago. The first theater was designed by architect Howard Van Doren Shaw (in the location since occupied by the museum's Modern Wing). Its design had to meet location restrictions due to a city ordinance restricting the height of lakefront buildings, resulting in unique solutions such as a low-lying entrance, and generous wing space to make up for the lack of a high fly tower.

The opening ceremony on October 20, 1925, featured three of Kenneth Sawyer Goodman's plays: Back of the Yards, The Green Scarf, and The Game of Chess. Two nights later the theater presented its first public performance, The Forest by John Galsworthy, which continued through that November in repertory with The Romantic Young Lady attributed to Gregorio Martínez Sierra and translated by Helen Granville Barker.

In its next years and leading into the Depression the theater struggled financially and as its parent organization, the Art Institute had been guaranteeing its losses. In May 1930, the Tribune reported on a situation they referred to in headlines as the "Goodman Row:" Not only was Thomas Wood Stevens, the Goodman's director since its founding five years previously, resigning over disagreements with the theater committee–that included founder William O. Goodman–but the majority of the company was as well; while Hubert Osborne was named to succeed as director. Stevens and the actors had a long list of grievances: They had invested five years developing the repertory company from the ground up, starting with "twenty dollars a week" but "much spirit," and were sure they could succeed slowly but surely. They claimed the Art Institute was asking them to lower their ideals, and could only see the deficit without insight that theirs was one of the lowest in the United States. They felt the institute wanted to incorporate the star system, and put on "so-called pleasant, unimportant plays." They believed that not only was the director-replacement not thought out, but that Osborne himself, ethically should not accept the appointment in light of the circumstances. In subsequent months the company had disbanded.

Osborne picked up the director mantle and opened the 1930–31 season with The Firebrand by Edwin Justus Mayer followed by A Chinese Bungalow by Marion Osmond and James Corbett, and It's a Wise Child by Laurence E. Johnson. In his summation of that season the following April, critic Charles Collins compared the management dispute as a "play within a play" where the Art Institute theater committee members were the players, and the public were waiting to see the outcome they imagined being held in the Art Institute's "innermost shrine," to decide the fate of the theater. By October, Collins declared the theater in a coma.

Meanwhile, the Goodman opened a drama conservatory offering a three-year training program in September 1930. The first play opening their 1932 season was The Cassills' Engagement by St. John Hankin The theater soon had notable alumni such as Karl Malden, Geraldine Page, and Joe Mantegna; and for the next two decades became known for their children's theater program.

=== Revival and independence (1957–1984) ===
In 1957 Vienna-trained director John Reich arrived to lead the Goodman and its Theater School. In its 27th season he revived the professional theater by rebuilding the subscription base and seasons, reintroducing a resident acting company made of students and occasional seasoned performers, and works by Eugene O'Neill, Jean Giraudoux, Hugo von Hofmannsthal, Bernard Shaw, Tennessee Williams as well as his own adaptation of Shakespeare's A Midsummer Night's Dream.

In 1969, the theater and school formally split so that the Goodman could go entirely professional. After Reich retired at the end of the 1971–72 season, the theater was without an artistic director. William Woodman, a directing professor at the Juilliard School, was invited in February 1973 to take over. Its 1975–76 season was not only the Goodman's 50th birthday, but the nation's bicentennial, inspiring a six-play subscription series looking at America through the eyes of Thornton Wilder in Our Town, poet Robert Lowell in his Benito Cereno, Eugene O'Neill with Mourning Becomes Electra, Preston Jones in his new work Bradleyville, Israel Horovitz in Our Father's Failing, and George Bernard Shaw in The Devil's Disciple.

In the summer of 1977 the Art Institute announced it would withdraw its support for the Goodman theater over the next three years. The newly formed Chicago Theatre Group, took over raising funds for the Goodman, and by April 1979 had raised the $2 million required by the Art Institute to be self-sufficient. Woodman's former assistant Gregory Mosher who had led Stage 2 since its founding in 1974–launching careers of playwrights including David Mamet and Scott MacPherson–succeeded him in September 1978.

The Art Institute wanted also to divest itself from the Goodman drama school to focus its resources on their students of visual arts. After being courted by the University of Illinois at Chicago Circle, Roosevelt University, Shimer College, and others, in 1978, effective July 1 that year, DePaul University prevailed, saying it would incorporate the Goodman School of Drama into its newly acquired campus in Lincoln Park at Lincoln, Halsted, and Fullerton.

=== A new home (since 1985) ===
Robert Falls took over in 1985, and during his 35-year tenure attracted myriad talents including directors Michael Maggio and David Petrarca, playwrights Dael Orlandersmith and Regina Taylor, and set and costume designers Joseph Nieminski and Virgil Johnson respectively.

The company wanted a new space with better acoustics and more space for scenery and effects. After a 12-year campaign to raise funds to move to a new home, in November 2000, the Goodman moved into their new theater at 170 North Dearborn in Chicago's theater district. The 171,000 square feet (15,900 m^{2}) project was designed by Toronto firm KPMB Architects, DLK Architecture Inc., and architects associated with the McClier Corporation. It has two fully modern auditoriums, named the Albert and the Owen, after two members of the Goodman family who continue to be major donors. In August 2000, associate artistic director Michael Maggio died and the company established the Michael Maggio Emerging Designer Award in his honor; it is bestowed alongside the Michael Merritt Award for Excellence in Design and Collaboration.

In 2022 after artistic directorship at Atlanta's Alliance Theatre, Susan V. Booth took over from Falls, becoming the first woman to lead the Goodman. Celebrating its 100th birthday in 2025, Chicago Tribune writer Chris Jones called the Goodman "the most important theater in America's second most important theatrical city."

== Awards ==
In 1992, the theatre company received the Regional Theatre Tony Award, joining Steppenwolf Theatre as Chicago-based recipients of the award. Since then, four other Chicago-based companies, Victory Gardens Theater (in 2001), Chicago Shakespeare Theater (in 2008), Lookingglass Theatre Company (in 2011), and Court Theatre (Chicago) (in 2022) have also received the award, making Chicago the most recognized city in the country by this prestigious live theater award. The Goodman has also won many Joseph Jefferson awards.

== Notable productions ==
Notable productions at Goodman Theatre include: the U.S. premiere of The Freedom of the City by Brian Friel (1973, directed by William Woodman), the first Goodman production that was transferred to New York; and the world premiere of David Mamet's American Buffalo (1975, directed by Gregory Mosher). Its production of Arthur Miller's Death of a Salesman (1998, directed by Robert Falls and starring Bryan Dennehy as Willy Loman) transferred to Broadway where it received four 1999 Tony Awards: best revival of a play, best actor, best featured actress for Elizabeth Franz (as Linda Loman), and best direction. Rebecca Gilman's Boy Gets Girl received its world premiere at the Goodman (2000, directed by Michael Maggio). In 2003, August Wilson premiered Gem of the Ocean at the Goodman, which also produced Wilson's entire Century Cycle. In 2004, Arthur Miller premiered his final play at the Goodman, Finishing the Picture (directed by Robert Falls).

Other productions include Inherit the Wind (2024, directed by Henry Godinez), The Nacirema Society (2023, directed by Lili-Anne Brown), Lucha Teotl (2023, written and directed by Christopher Llewyn Ramirez and Jeff Colangelo), Highway Patrol (2024, directed by Mike Donahue), The Matchbox Magic Flute (2024, directed by Mary Zimmerman), The Penelopiad (2024, directed by Susan V. Booth), Joe Turner's Come and Gone (2024, directed by Chuck Smith), English (2024, directed by Hamid Dehghani), and Midnight in the Garden of Good and Evil (2024, directed by Rob Ashford).

== See also ==
- Goodman School of Drama
