= Edwin Wheeler =

19th-century American lawyer, politician and judge

The Honorable Edwin Wheeler

Wisconsin Circuit Court Judge for the 10th Circuit
- In office 1861 – January 22, 1864
- Preceded by: S. R. Cotton
- Succeeded by: Ganem W. Washburn

Member of the Wisconsin Senate from the 21st district
- In office January 1, 1857 – January 1, 1859
- Preceded by: John Fitzgerald
- Succeeded by: Ganem W. Washburn

Personal details
- Born: June 28, 1828 Unionville, Ohio, U.S.
- Died: January 22, 1864 (aged 35) Oshkosh, Wisconsin, U.S.
- Resting place: Riverside Cemetery; Oshkosh, Wisconsin, U.S.
- Party: Republican

Edwin Wheeler (June 28, 1828 – January 22, 1864) was an American lawyer, politician, and judge. He was a Wisconsin Circuit Court Judge for the last 3 years of his life, and served two years in the Wisconsin State Senate.

== Biography ==
Born in Unionville, Ohio, in Lake County, Ohio, Wheeler studied law in Akron, Ohio, and in Madison, Wisconsin, and was admitted to the Wisconsin Bar in 1849. He moved to Neenah, Wisconsin, where he practiced law. In 1852, he moved to Oshkosh, Wisconsin, and was elected county judge for Winnebago County. Wheeler served in the Wisconsin State Senate 1857–1858. In 1861, Wheeler was elected Wisconsin Circuit Court judge serving until his death. He died in Oshkosh, Wisconsin.
