= Alanson M. Kimball =

19th century American politician

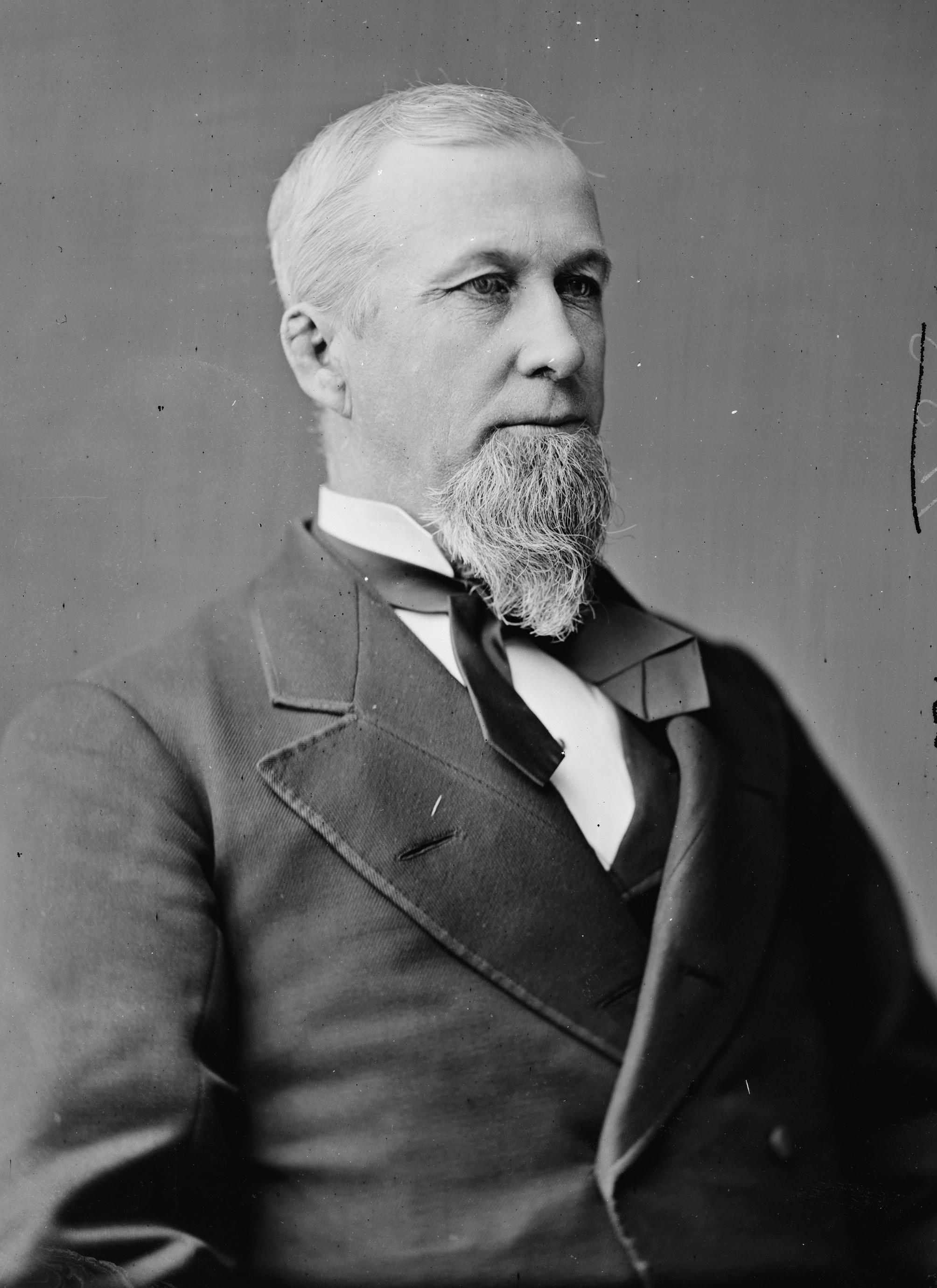

Member of the U.S. House of Representatives from Wisconsin's 6th district
- In office March 4, 1875 – March 3, 1877
- Preceded by: Philetus Sawyer
- Succeeded by: Gabriel Bouck

Member of the Wisconsin Senate from the 9th district
- In office January 1, 1863 – January 1, 1865
- Preceded by: John T. Kingston
- Succeeded by: Henry G. Webb

Personal details
- Born: March 12, 1827 Buxton, Maine, U.S.
- Died: May 26, 1913 (aged 86) Pine River, Waushara County, Wisconsin, U.S.
- Resting place: Pine River Cemetery, Pine River, Wisconsin
- Party: Republican
- Spouse: Frances Abigail Waterman (m. 1852; died 1892)
- Children: Charles A. Kimball^{(b. 1854; died 1856)}; Charles A. Kimball^{(b. 1857; died 1932)}; Ella A. (Clark)^{(b. 1853)}

Alanson Mellen Kimball (March 12, 1827 – May 26, 1913) was an American politician who served as a member of the United States House of Representatives from Wisconsin's 6th congressional district. He also served one term in the Wisconsin Senate, representing Adams, Juneau, and Waushara counties.

== Biography ==
Born in Buxton, Maine, Kimball moved to Wisconsin in 1852 and engaged in agricultural and mercantile pursuits, later serving in the Wisconsin State Senate in 1863 and 1864. He was elected as a member of the Republican Party to the United States House of Representatives in 1874 as part of the 44th Congress representing Wisconsin's 6th congressional district. Following his defeat for re-election in 1876, he became involved in the lumber business and served as a delegate to the 1884 Republican National Convention in Chicago.

== Death and legacy ==
Kimball died in Pine River, Waushara County, Wisconsin, on May 26, 1913. He is interred at Pine River Cemetery. He was preceded in death by his wife, Frances, and his first son, Charlie.

The town of Kimball, Wisconsin, in Iron County, is named in his honor.

Wisconsin Senate
Preceded by John T. Kingston	Member of the Wisconsin Senate from the 9th district January 1, 1863 – January 1, 1865	Succeeded by Henry G. Webb
U.S. House of Representatives
Preceded by Philetus Sawyer	Member of the U.S. House of Representatives from Wisconsin's 6th congressional district March 4, 1875 – March 3, 1877	Succeeded by Gabriel Bouck
