= List of mayors of Oshkosh, Wisconsin =

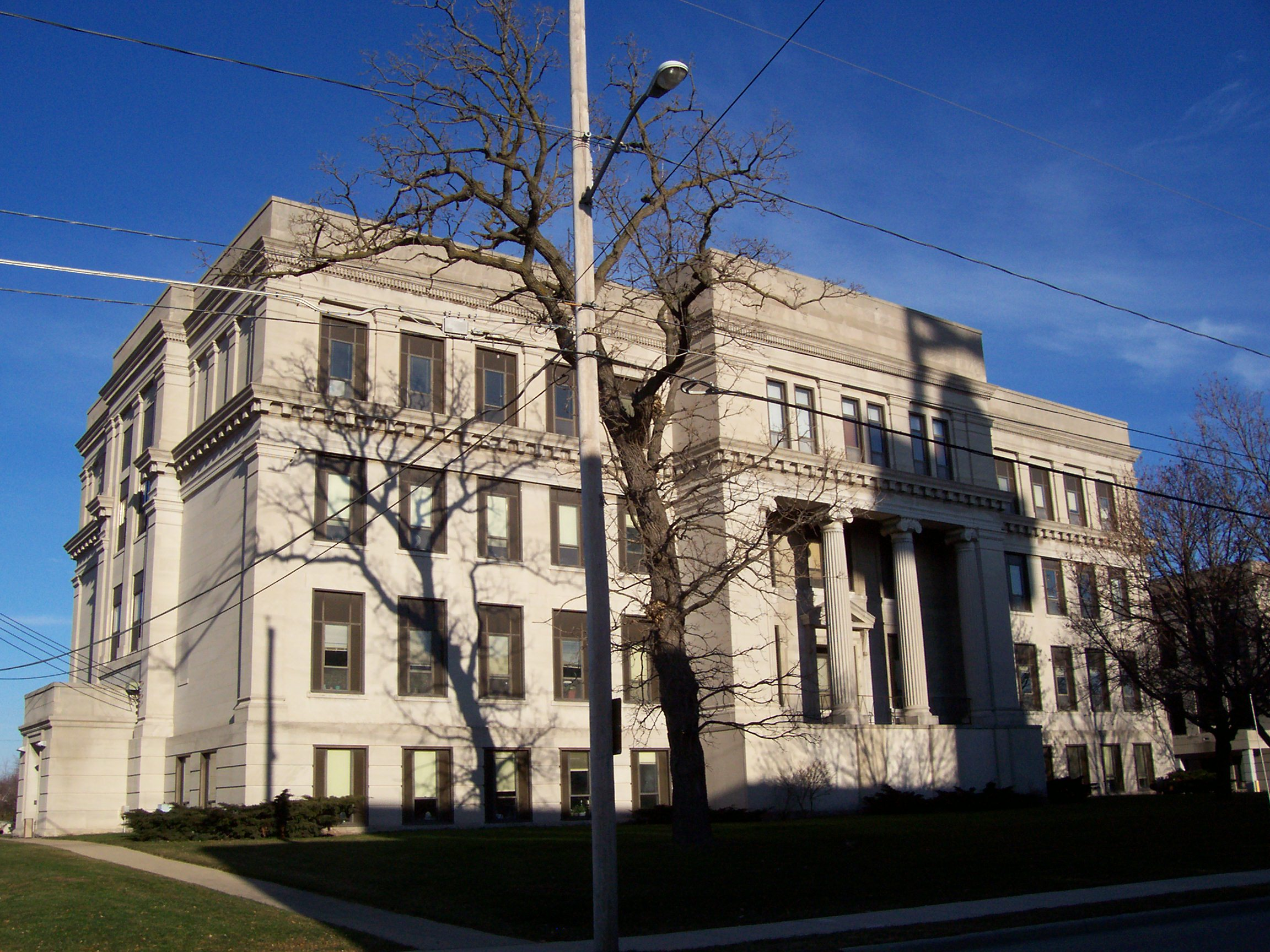
Oshkosh city hall in 2006

This is a list of mayors of Oshkosh, Wisconsin, USA. Oshkosh was originally incorporated as a city in 1853 with a mayor-council form of government. Executive functions were transferred to a city manager in 1956 and the office of mayor was abolished. The office of mayor was re-established in 1979 as a replacement for the city council president, elected by the city council, with additional ceremonial duties. The office of mayor was then modified again in 2004, to allow voters to directly elect the mayor and grant the mayor veto power over the city council. The city manager, however, remains the chief executive of the city.

== Original mayor system (1853–1957) ==
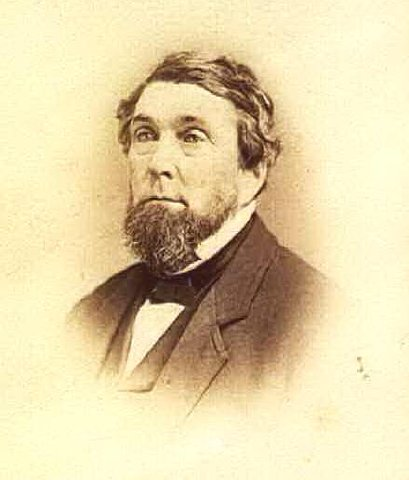
Edward Eastman, 1st mayor of Oshkosh, from a visiting card circa 1867

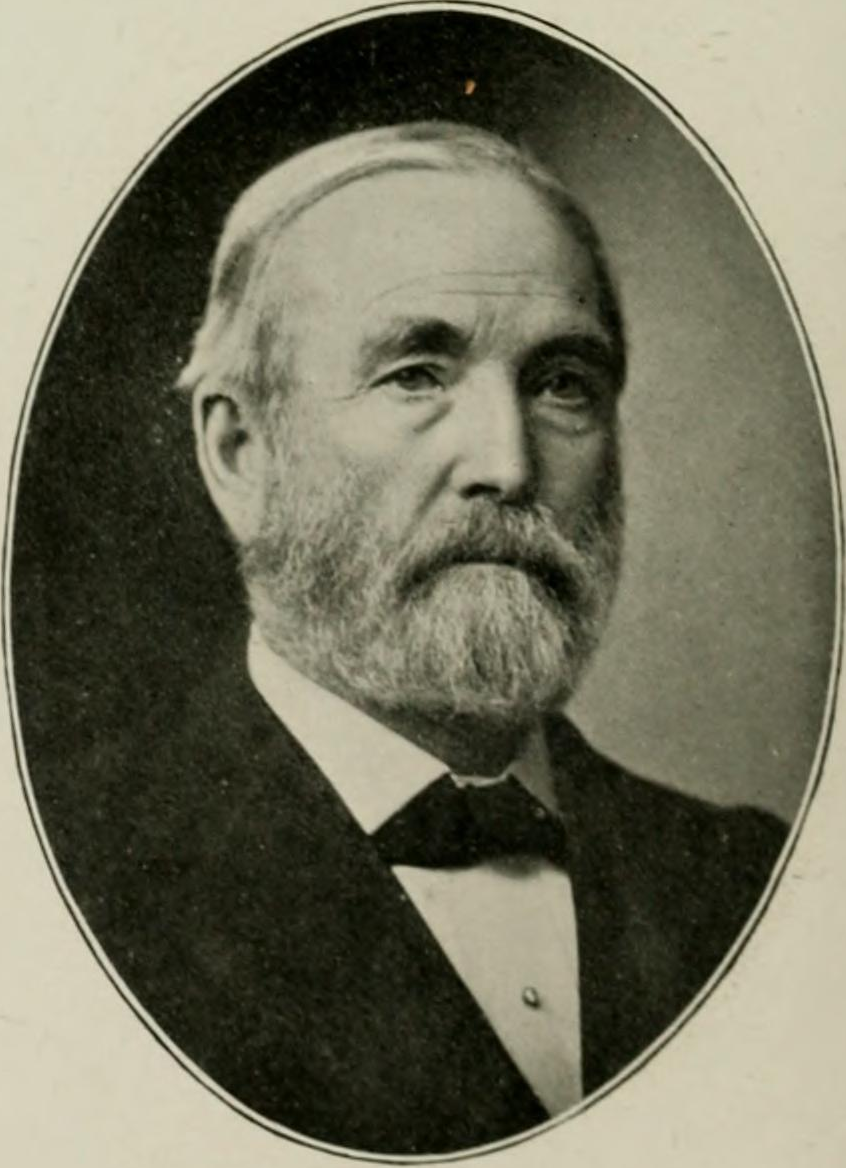
Samuel M. Hay, 5th mayor of Oshkosh, portrait from Notable Men of Wisconsin (1902)

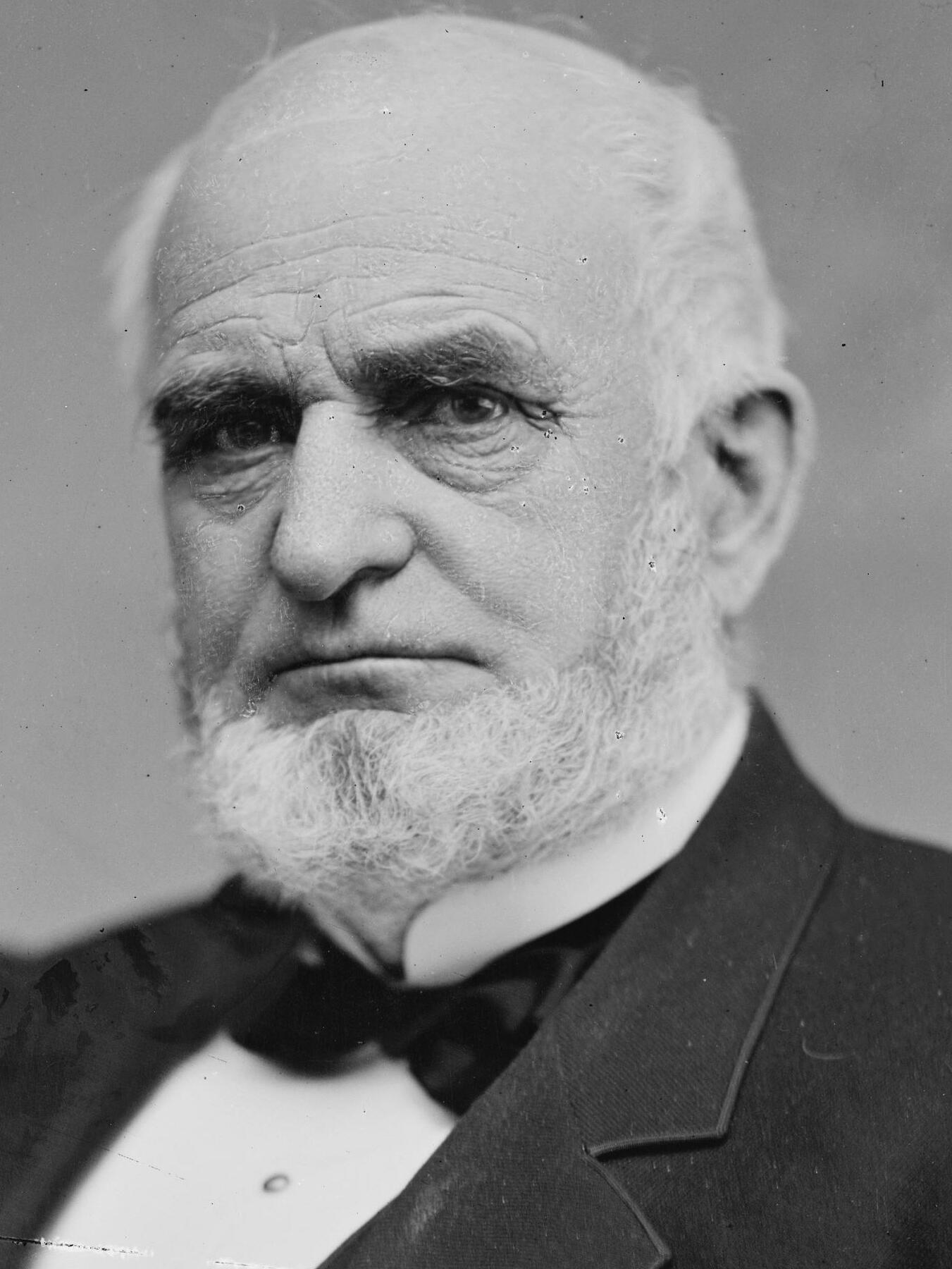
Philetus Sawyer, 9th mayor of Oshkosh

Order	Mayor	Term start	Term end	Notes
1	Edward Eastman	1853	1854	
2	Joseph Jackson	1854	1856	
3	Thomas A. Follett	1856	1857	
4	Joseph Jackson	1857	1858	
5	Samuel M. Hay	1858	1860	
6	Benjamin S. Henning	1860	1861	
7	John Fitzgerald	1861	1862	
8	Henry C. Jewell	1862	1863	
9	Philetus Sawyer	1863	1865	Elected 1863. Re-elected 1864. Elected U.S. representative 1864. Elected U.S. senator 1881.
10	Carlton Foster	1865	1867	
11	Joseph H. Porter	1867	1868	
12	Charles W. Davis	1868	1869	
13	Joseph H. Porter	1869	1870	
14	Joseph Stringham	1870	1871	
15	James V. Jones	1871	1872	
16	James Jenkins	1872	1873	
17	James V. Jones	1873	1875	
18	Joseph Stringham	1875	1876	
19	Andrew Haben	1876	1878	
20	Sanford Beckwith	1878	1879	
21	Harvey B. Dale	1879	1880	
22	Joseph Stringham	1881	1882	
23	George White Pratt	1882	1885	
24	Andrew Haben	1885	1886	
25	Carlton Foster	1886	1887	
26	Harvey B. Dale	1887	1889	
27	Ephraim E. Stevens	1889	1890	
28	George White Pratt	1890	1891	
29	William Dichmann	1891	1893	
30	Charles Oellerich	1893	1895	
31	Arthur Kellogg	1895	1897	
32	Alison B. Ideson	1897	1899	
33	James H. Merrill	1899	1901	
34	John Mulva	1901	1905	
35	John Banderob	1905	1909	
36	John C. Voss	1909	1911	
37	John Banderob	1911	1912	
38	John Mulva	1912	1918	
39	A. C. McHenry	1918	1924	
40	Henry F. Kitz	1924	1930	
41	Taylor G. Brown	1930	1933	
42	George F. Oaks	1933	1935	
43	Charles A. Wiechering	1935	1939	
44	George F. Oaks	1939	1947	
45	Ernest R. Siewert	1947	1953	
46	John C. Voss	1953	1955	
47	Ernest R. Siewert	1955	1957	

== City manager (1957–present) ==
In November 1956, Oshkosh voters agreed to a referendum which abolished the office of mayor and entrusted executive functions to a city manager to be hired by the city council. To this day, the Oshkosh city manager is the chief executive in the city, despite the re-creation of the office of mayor.

Order	Manager	Term start	Term end	Notes
1	Hans S. Thorgrimsen	1957	1960	
2	Raymond E. Harbaugh	1960	1966	
3	Angus Crawford	1966	1970	
Acting	Jack Schneiuder	1970	1970	
4	Gordon Jaeger	1970	1976	
Acting	David Wendtland	1976	1976	
5	William D. Frueh	1976	1996	Resigned 1996.
Acting	Gerald Konrad	1996	1996	
6	Richard Wollangk	1996	2007	Elected by city council 1996. Resigned 2007.
Acting	John Fitzpatrick	2007	2008	
7	Mark Rohloff	2008	present	Elected by city council 2008.

== Hybrid mayor-council president (1979–2005) ==
In 1979, the Oshkosh city council voted to re-establish the office of "mayor". The new mayoral office replaced the office of city council president with slightly expanded powers to make appointments to city boards and commissions, and to serve as the ceremonial leader of the city. The mayor was not directly elected, but was chosen by a vote of the city council each April at the start of the city council session for a one-year term. All city councilmembers were at that time elected at-large.

Order	Mayor	Term start	Term end	Notes
48	Kenneth Schiefelbein	1979	1980	
49	Donald Kutchera	1980	1982	
50	Robert Pung	1982	1984	Defeated Kutchera in April 1982 city council vote (4–3)
51	Kathleen Propp	1984	1986	First woman as mayor, elected by council 1984. Re-elected by council 1985.
52	Floyd Chapin	1986	1988	Elected by council 1986. Re-elected by council 1987.
53	James Mather	1988	1990	Elected by council 1988. Re-elected by council 1989.
54	Thomas Binner	1990	1992	Elected by council 1990. Re-elected by council 1991.
55	Robert Jungwirth	1992	1993	Elected by council 1992. Gambling scandal.
56	Richard Wollangk	1993	1996	Defeated Jungwirth in April 1993 city council vote (5–2); Re-elected by council 1994. Re-elected by council 1995.
57	William Castle	1996	1998	Elected by council 1996. Re-elected by council 1997.
58	Melanie Bloechl	1998	2000	Elected by council 1998. Re-elected by council 1999.
59	Jon Dell'Antonia	2000	2002	Elected by council 2000. Re-elected by council 2001.
60	Stephen Hintz	2002	2004	Elected by council 2002. Re-elected by council 2003.
61	Mark Harris	2004	2005	Elected by council 2004. Elected county executive 2005.

== Mayors (2005–present) ==
In November 2004, Oshkosh voters agreed to a referendum which restored the mayor as a directly elected officer with veto power over the city council. Mayors are elected to two-year terms.

Order	Mayor	Term start	Term end	Notes
62	William Castle	2005	2007	Elected 2005.
63	Frank Tower	2007	2009	Elected 2007.
64	Paul J. Esslinger	2009	2011	Defeated Tower in 2007 election.
65	Burk Tower	2011	2015	Elected 2011. Re-elected 2013.
66	Steve Cummings	2015	2019	Elected 2015.
67	Lori Palmeri	2019	2023	First woman popularly elected as mayor. Defeated Cummings in 2019 election. Re-elected 2021. Elected state representative 2022.
68	Matt Mugerauer	2023	present	Elected 2023.

== See also ==
- Oshkosh history
