= Ezra Wheeler =

American politician (1820–1871)

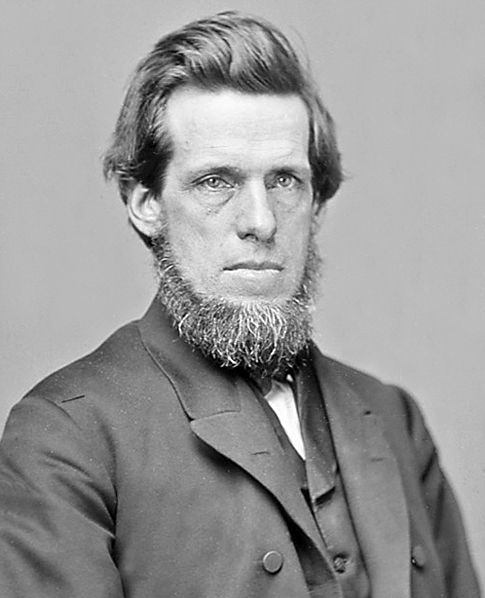

Member of the U.S. House of Representatives from Wisconsin's 5th district
- In office March 4, 1863 – March 3, 1865
- Preceded by: District created
- Succeeded by: Philetus Sawyer

Member of the Wisconsin State Assembly
- In office 1853

Personal details
- Born: December 23, 1820 Chenango County, New York, U.S.
- Died: September 19, 1871 (aged 50) Pueblo, Colorado, U.S.
- Resting place: Oakwood Cemetery, Berlin, Wisconsin, U.S.
- Party: Democratic
- Spouse: Martha J. Ayers
- Children: 2
- Education: Union College
- Profession: Politician, lawyer, judge

Ezra Wheeler (December 23, 1820 – September 19, 1871) was an American politician, lawyer, and judge who served a single term in the United States House of Representatives, representing the 5th congressional district of Wisconsin from 1863 to 1865 as a Democrat in the 38th United States Congress.

== Early life and education ==
Wheeler was born in Chenango County, New York, on December 23, 1820. He received a liberal preparatory schooling and graduated from Union College in 1842. After moving to Berlin, Wisconsin, in 1849, Wheeler began studying law.

== Career ==
Wheeler was admitted to the bar; he commenced practice in Berlin.

Wheeler served as a member of the Wisconsin State Assembly in 1853. Additionally, he served as a judge of Green Lake County from 1854 to 1862.

In 1862, Wheeler was elected to a single term in the United States House of Representatives, defeating Republican state senator Edward L. Browne in the general election. Wheeler served from March 4, 1863 to March 3, 1865, representing the newly created 5th congressional district of Wisconsin as a Democrat in the 38th United States Congress. He was one of 14 House Democrats to vote in favor of the Thirteenth Amendment to the United States Constitution on its second and final vote, and also one of 4 to vote in favor of it on its first vote.

Following his tenure in Congress, Wheeler resumed practicing law in Berlin.

== Personal life and death ==
Wheeler was married to Martha J. Ayers, with whom he had two children.

Due to ill health, Wheeler moved to Pueblo, Colorado, in 1870, where he was appointed register of the land office in Pueblo on June 27, 1871. He served until his death at the age of 50 on September 19, 1871. He was interred in Oakwood Cemetery, located in Berlin.

== See also ==
- List of United States representatives who served a single term

Wisconsin State Assembly
Preceded by —	Member of the Wisconsin State Assembly; 1853	Succeeded by —
U.S. House of Representatives
Preceded by District created	Member of the U.S. House of Representatives from Wisconsin's 5th congressional district 1863–1865	Succeeded by Philetus Sawyer
