= Charles Rahr =

American politician

Charles Rahr (December 17, 1865 – November 4, 1925) was an American businessman and politician.

Born in Oshkosh, Wisconsin, Rahr was the owner of the Rahr Brewing Company in Oshkosh, Wisconsin. Rahr served in the Wisconsin State Assembly and was a Republican and served one term. Rahr died suddenly of a heart attack at his home in Oshkosh, Wisconsin. Rahr was interred at Riverside Cemetery.
