= Riverside Cemetery (Oshkosh, Wisconsin) =

Historic cemetery in Winnebago County, Wisconsin, U.S.

- U.S. National Register of Historic Places
- Location within Wisconsin Location within the United States
- Location: 1901 Algoma Blvd., Oshkosh, Wisconsin
- Coordinates: 44.04299°N 88.56487°W
- Area: 98.4 acres (39.8 ha)
- Built: 1855 (171 years ago)
- Architectural style: Classical Revival, Gothic
- NRHP reference No.: 03000578
- Added to NRHP: June 26, 2003

Riverside Cemetery is located in Oshkosh, Wisconsin, United States, and was listed on the U.S. National Register of Historic Places in 2003.

== Founding and expansion of cemetery ==
On March 6, 1855, the city of Oshkosh purchased a land parcel from Maria Grignon for creation of a cemetery. The parcel was located on the east bank of the Fox River and was named Riverside Cemetery. It was built as a replacement for the Locust Grove Cemetery, which was the first burial ground in Oshkosh and built in 1848. Between 1855 and 1869, the remains of those buried in Locust Grove were moved to Riverside Cemetery.

In 1855, the Riverside Catholic cemetery was laid out north of the cemetery and expanded further in 1875. In 1868, a parcel was purchased east of the Riverside Cemetery by Masons. In 1882, the city purchased 38 acres (15 ha) in the north edge of the Catholic plots. In 1887, the city sold off 10 acres (4.0 ha) to the Catholic Church. In 1914, an additional 61 acres (25 ha) were purchased from H. C. Rogers, expanding the cemetery to 98.39 acres (39.82 ha), the current size today.

== Landmarks ==
- Burr/End of the Trail Monument – erected by John Burr in 1929, the monument depicts an American Indian and his weary horse. It is an interpretation of James Fraser's sculpture End of the Trail.
- Grand Army of the Republic (G.A.R.) Memorial – erected in 1894, memorial to the Grand Army of the Republic.
- Riverside Cemetery Gateway – erected around 1930, Rustic-style gateway.
- Soldier and Sailor Monument – erected in 1924, 40-foot granite obelisk dedicated to veterans of the Spanish–American War and World War I.

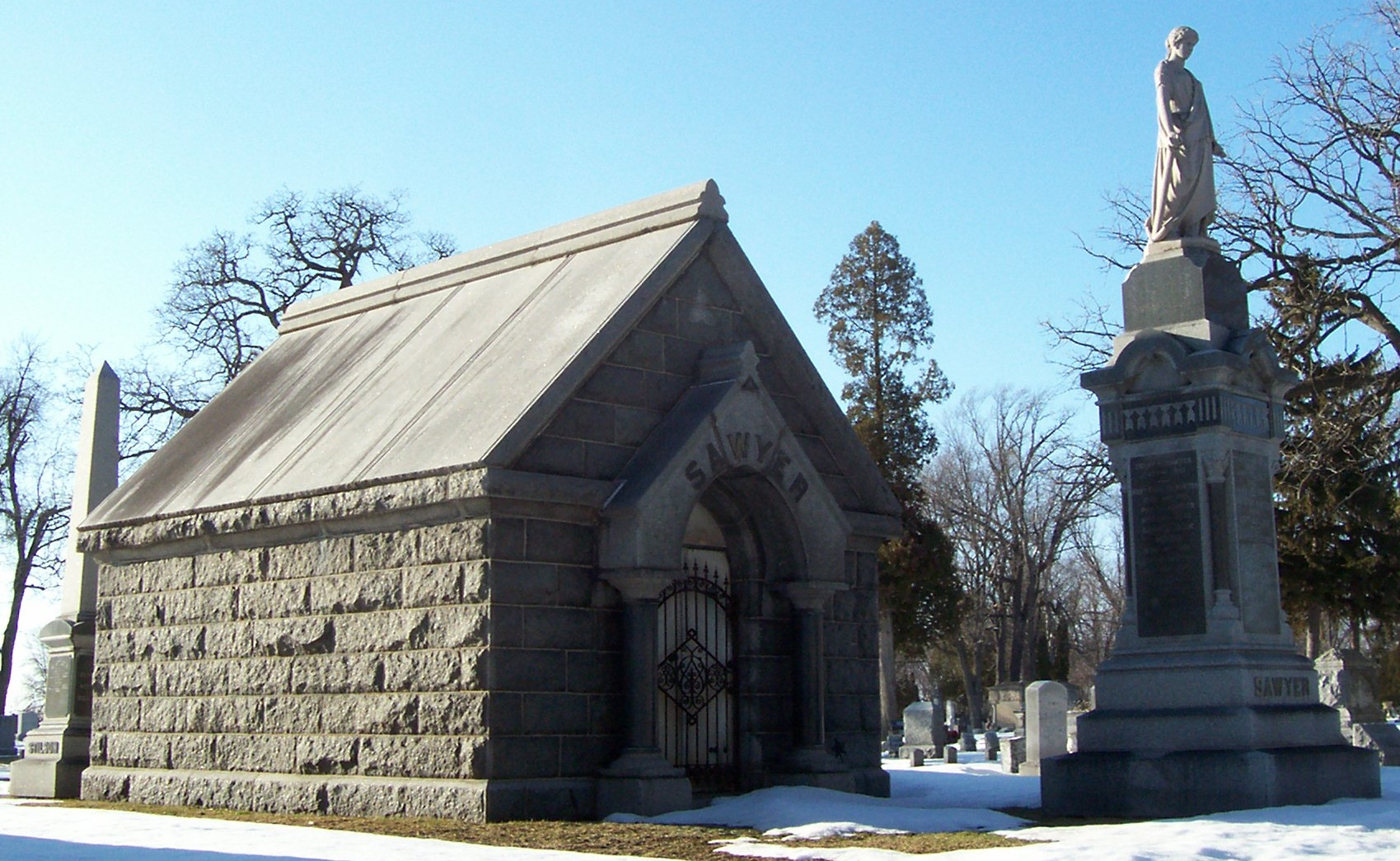
Mausoleum for family of U.S. Congressman Philetus Sawyer at Riverside Cemetery

== Notable burials ==
- Thomas Allen (1825–1905), Secretary of State of Wisconsin and Wisconsin Assemblyman
- George Rex Andrews (1808–1873), U.S. Representative from New York
- Lyman E. Barnes (1855–1904), lawyer and U.S. Representative from Wisconsin
- Charles R. Boardman (1860–1950), Adjutant General of Wisconsin and American general in World War I
- Gabriel Bouck (1828–1904), Attorney General of Wisconsin and U.S. Representative from Wisconsin.
- Charles Frederick Burgess (1873–1945), University of Wisconsin professor, pioneer of electrochemical engineering
- Frank Merrill Caldwell (1866–1937), U.S. Army general in World War I
- James H. Davidson (1858–1918), lawyer and U.S. Representative from Wisconsin
- Edward Eastman (1806–1870), mayor of Oshkosh and Wisconsin Assemblyman
- George Fitch (1848–1896), Wisconsin state senator
- John Fitzgerald (died 1963), 7th mayor of Oshkosh, Wisconsin state senator
- Richard W. Guenther (1945–1913), Treasurer of Wisconsin and U.S. representative from Wisconsin.
- Samuel McClellan Hay (1825–1906), 5th mayor of Oshkosh, Wisconsin state senator and bank president
- Henry C. Jewell (1811–1889), 8th mayor of Oshkosh, Wisconsin state representative
- Florian Lampert (1963–1930), U.S. representative from Wisconsin
- Lucas M. Miller (1924–1902), U.S. Representative from Wisconsin
- Charles Rahr (1865–1925), Wisconsin state representative and owner of Rahr Brewing Company
- Christian Sarau (1839–1903), Wisconsin state representative and state senator
- Philetus Sawyer (1816–1900), U.S. senator and U.S. representative from Wisconsin
- Ganem W. Washburn (1823–1907), Wisconsin state senator and judge
- Edwin Wheeler (1828–1864), Wisconsin state senator and judge
