= Frank Challoner =

American businessman and politician

Member of the Wisconsin State Assembly
- In office 1885–1889

Personal details
- Born: July 6, 1853 Omro, Wisconsin
- Died: January 11, 1899 (aged 46) Oshkosh, Wisconsin
- Party: Republican
- Education: University of Wisconsin

Frank Challoner (July 6, 1853 – January 11, 1899) was an American businessman and politician who served as a member of the Wisconsin State Assembly.

== Biography ==
Born in Omro, Wisconsin, Challoner attended the University of Wisconsin and lived in California for two years. Challoner was the owner of Frank Challoner & Company in Oshkosh, Wisconsin. Challoner served as president of the Omro Village Board and was a Republican. Challoner served in the Wisconsin State Assembly from 1885 to 1889.

Challoner served on the University of Wisconsin–Madison board of regents at the time of his death. Challoner died in Oshkosh, Wisconsin.
