= Philetus Sawyer =

19th century American politician

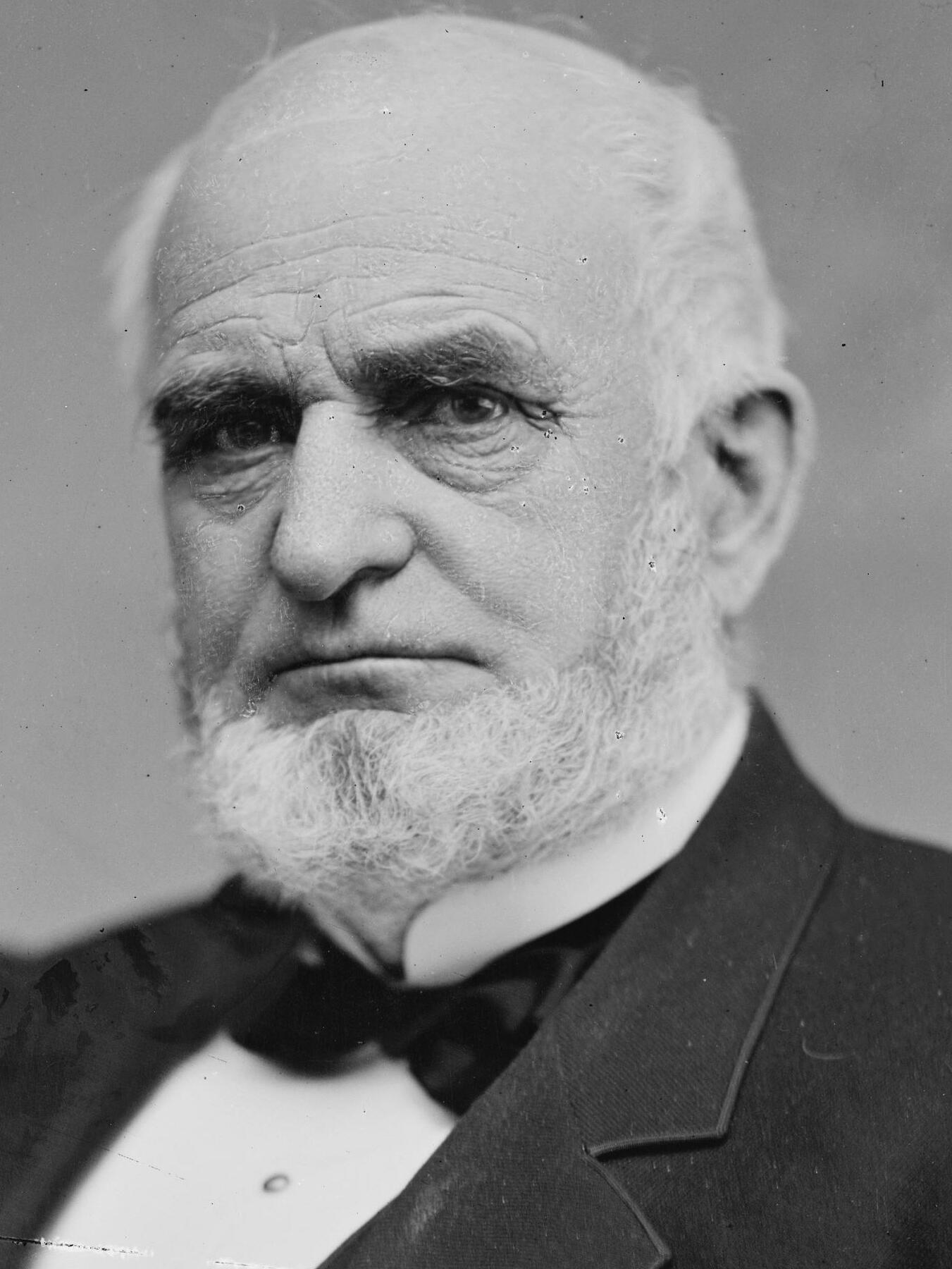
- Photo ca. 1870s, from the Brady-Handy collection

Chairman of the Senate Railroad Committee
- In office March 4, 1883 – March 3, 1887
- Preceded by: William Pitt Kellogg
- Succeeded by: Dwight M. Sabin

United States Senator from Wisconsin
- In office March 4, 1881 – March 3, 1893
- Preceded by: Angus Cameron
- Succeeded by: John L. Mitchell

Member of the U.S. House of Representatives from Wisconsin
- In office March 4, 1865 – March 3, 1875
- Preceded by: Ezra Wheeler (5th); Jeremiah M. Rusk (6th)
- Succeeded by: Charles A. Eldredge (5th); Alanson M. Kimball (6th)
- Constituency: 5th district (1865-73); 6th district (1873-75)

9th Mayor of Oshkosh, Wisconsin
- In office April 1863 – April 1865
- Preceded by: Henry C. Jewell
- Succeeded by: Carlton Foster

Member of the Wisconsin State Assembly from the Winnebago 1st district
- In office January 7, 1861 – January 6, 1862
- Preceded by: Gabriel Bouck
- Succeeded by: William E. Hanson
- In office January 5, 1857 – January 4, 1858
- Preceded by: John Anunson
- Succeeded by: Samuel M. Hay

Personal details
- Born: September 22, 1816 Whiting, Vermont, U.S.
- Died: March 29, 1900 (aged 83) Oshkosh, Wisconsin, U.S.
- Resting place: Riverside Cemetery, Oshkosh
- Party: Republican; Free Soil (before 1854)
- Spouse: Melvina M. Hadley (m. 1841; died 1888)
- Children: Edgar Philetus Sawyer^{(b. 1842; died 1927)}; Earl T. Sawyer^{(b. 1845; died 1848)}; Ella E. Sawyer^{(b. 1849; died 1851)}; Emma (White)^{(b. 1856; died 1896)}; Erna (Goodman)^{(b. 1859; died 1943)}
- Relatives: William O. Goodman (son-in-law)

Philetus Sawyer (September 22, 1816 – March 29, 1900) was an American businessman, Republican politician, and Wisconsin pioneer. He was a United States Senator from Wisconsin for twelve years (1881–1893) and served ten years in the U.S. House of Representatives (1865–1875). At the height of his power, Sawyer was described as one of the "triumvirate" of stalwart Wisconsin Republicans who dominated the state party in the latter part of the 19th century, the other triumvirs being U.S. senator John Coit Spooner and businessman Henry Clay Payne.

Before serving in federal office, Sawyer was the 9th mayor of Oshkosh, Wisconsin, and represented the area for two terms in the Wisconsin State Assembly. He was an important leader in the development of the city of Oshkosh, and later in life made several philanthropic gifts to the city, including funds for the construction of the Oshkosh Public Library. Sawyer County, Wisconsin, is named for him.

Sawyer used his wealth and power to try to steal timber and property from the Menominee Nation in Northern Wisconsin. After Sawyer's election to Congress, he introduced bills that would have sold Menominee land at public auction and sold their timber. In 1871, the Menominee declared that they were unwilling to part with their lands or timber and began to cut timber and sell it on their own terms, despite Sawyer's efforts.

== Early life ==
Philetus Sawyer was born in 1816 in Whiting, Vermont, and moved with his family to rural forested Essex County, New York, as an infant in 1817. He was educated at rural schools and, at age 14, went to work in the lumber industry, providing most of his wages to his family. At age 17, he borrowed 100 dollars from his brother and paid it to his father to allow him to work at his own profit for a period of four years. At the end of that time, he had paid back his brother and paid for two years of his own education. Shortly after, he became the operator of a lumber mill in Essex County, where he earned a substantial profit through his 20s.

In 1847, Sawyer set out for the Wisconsin Territory, and settled a farm in Fond du Lac County. After two years toiling unsuccessfully at his farm, he decided to return to his lumbering roots in the nearby pine forests along the Wolf River. He sold his farm and moved to the village of "Algoma", now part of the city of Oshkosh, Wisconsin. He took over operation of a sawmill there and operated it successfully until 1853, when he went into business with Brand & Olcott, lumber manufacturers and dealers, and purchased the mill which he had been operating. Olcott retired in 1856, and Sawyer bought out Brand in 1862, becoming sole owner of the company, which he then operated as "P. Sawyer & Son".

== Early political career ==
During these years, Sawyer won his first elected offices. He was elected to the Wisconsin State Assembly from Winnebago County's 1st Assembly district in 1856, running on the Republican Party ticket, and served in the 10th Wisconsin Legislature. In 1859, he was elected to the Winnebago County board of supervisors, and in 1860, he won another term in the State Assembly, serving in the 14th Wisconsin Legislature. Sawyer was next elected mayor of Oshkosh in 1863 and 1864. As mayor, he settled a difficult municipal debt problem for the city.

== U.S. House of Representatives ==
Wisconsin's 5th congressional district 1862–1871

Sawyer had declined to run for U.S. House of Representatives in 1862, but in September 1864, he accepted the nomination from the Republican National Union Party convention for Wisconsin's 5th congressional district to be their candidate for that fall. The 5th congressional district had been created in the redistricting act of 1861, after Wisconsin had been apportioned three new congressional seats. In that decade, the district comprised roughly the entire northeast quadrant of the state.

His Democratic opponent was the recently returned Union Army colonel Gabriel Bouck, of the 18th Wisconsin Infantry Regiment. Despite his war record, Bouck was burdened by his association with the Democratic Party and their presidential nominee, George B. McClellan, who advocated a negotiated peace to end the American Civil War. Sawyer won the election with 57% of the vote.

Wisconsin's 6th congressional district 1872–1881

Sawyer won three more terms in this district, defeating Democratic nominees Morgan Lewis Martin, Joseph Vilas, and Joseph Stringham. After the 1870 United States census, Wisconsin was apportioned two additional congressional seats and a new redistricting was undertaken. Under the new plan, Sawyer resided in Wisconsin's 6th congressional district. In the 1872 election, Sawyer defeated Democrat Myron P. Lindsley, but announced two years later that he would not run for a sixth term.

During his time in Congress, Sawyer secured significant federal appropriations for river and harbor improvements in northern Wisconsin, due to his collection of favors. He declining the chairmanship of the then-powerful House Commerce Committee for three consecutive terms in favor of allies Nathan F. Dixon II, Samuel Shellabarger, and William A. Wheeler. His efforts won a massive six million dollar appropriation for northern Wisconsin in the River and Harbor Bill of 1871, approximately $155 million adjusted for inflation.

== U.S. Senate ==
After leaving Congress, Sawyer purchased and reorganized the West Wisconsin Railway. With further acquisitions, he consolidated his rail holdings into the Chicago, St. Paul, Minneapolis and Omaha Railway, and served as vice president and director of the company until 1880. He resigned from the duties that year to prepare a family trip to Europe.

That year, Wisconsin's junior U.S. Senator Angus Cameron announced he would not seek a second term. After initially expressing reluctance, Sawyer agreed to serve as U.S. Senator and skipped his European vacation, sending his son-in-law, William O. Goodman, along with his family instead. He was re-elected in 1887 and did not seek a third term in 1893.

Sawyer was at the peak of his power during those twelve years. He was chairman of the United States Senate Committee on Railroads for the 48th, 49th, and 50th U.S. congresses.

However, he became notorious for a charge made against him by Congressman Robert "Fighting Bob" La Follette that he had attempted to bribe La Follette.

== Personal life and legacy ==
Philetus Sawyer was the fifth of eleven children born to Ephraim Sawyer and his wife Mary (née Parks).

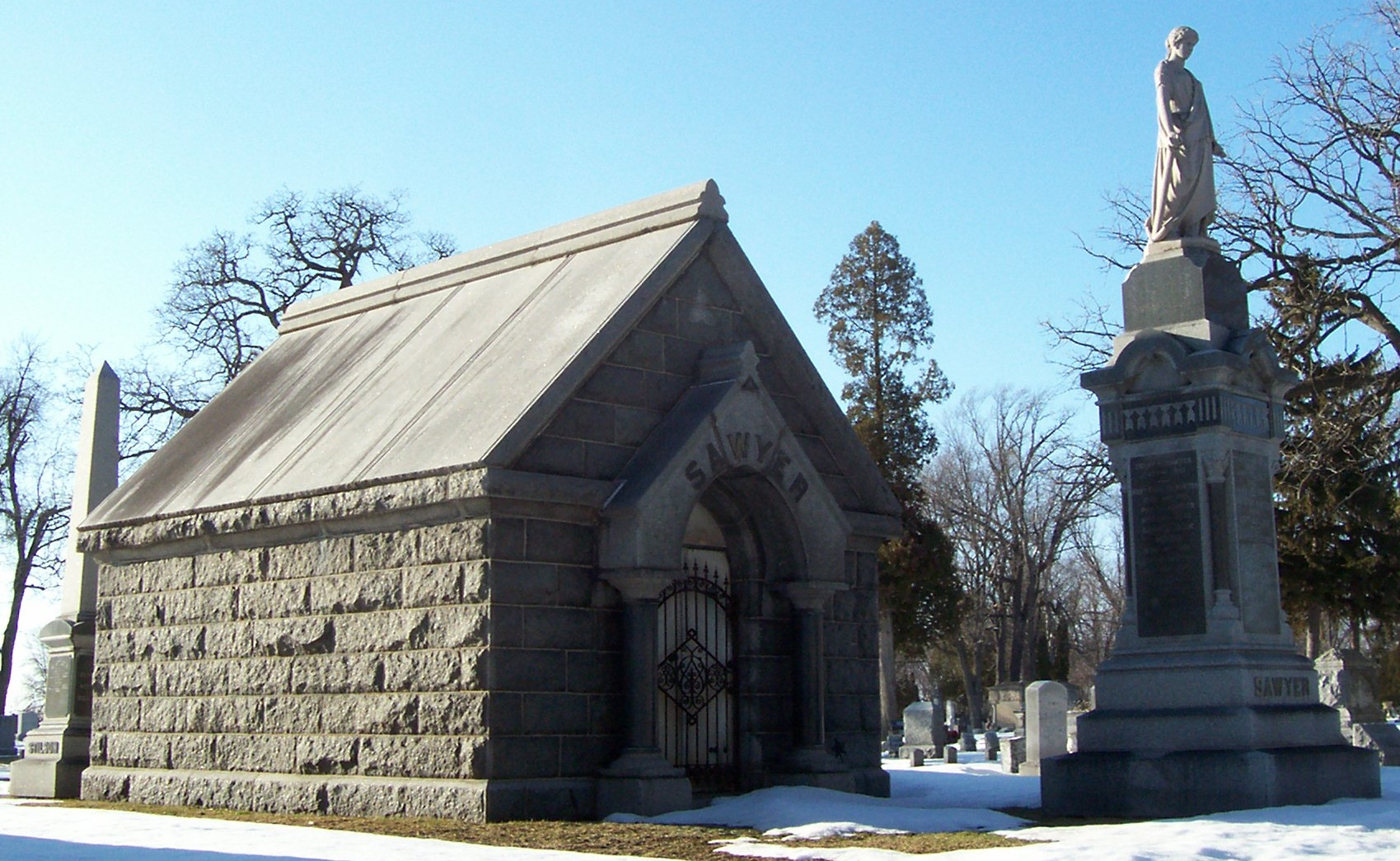
Sawyer's family mausoleum

Philetus Sawyer married Melvina M. Hadley in 1841. They had five children, though two died in childhood. Melvina died of a long illness in 1888. His eldest son, Edgar, married Mary Eleanor Jewell, the daughter of Oshkosh pioneer Henry C. Jewell.

Sawyer died at age 83 on the morning of March 29, 1900, at the home of his son, Edgar, in Oshkosh. He died after a brief illness, as if falling asleep. He was interred at a family mausoleum at Riverside Cemetery in Oshkosh.

The Wisconsin Legislature voted to name Sawyer County, Wisconsin, in his honor.

== Electoral history ==
=== U.S. House of Representatives, 5th district (1864–1870) ===
Year	Election	Date	Elected				Defeated				Total	Plurality
1864	General	Nov. 8	Philetus Sawyer	Natl. Union	12,576	56.84%	Gabriel Bouck	Dem.	9,550	43.16%	22,126	3,026
1866	General	Nov. 4	Philetus Sawyer (inc)	Republican	14,341	60.54%	Morgan Lewis Martin	Dem.	9,347	39.46%	23,688	4,994
1868	General	Nov. 3	Philetus Sawyer (inc)	Republican	19,622	55.81%	Joseph Vilas	Dem.	15,534	44.19%	35,156	4,088
1870	General	Nov. 8	Philetus Sawyer (inc)	Republican	17,258	59.35%	Joseph Stringham	Dem.	11,822	40.65%	29,080	5,436

=== U.S. House of Representatives, 6th district (1872) ===
Year	Election	Date	Elected				Defeated				Total	Plurality
1872	General	Nov. 5	Philetus Sawyer	Republican	15,803	56.12%	Myron P. Lindsley	Dem.	12,358	43.88%	28,161	3,445

=== U.S. Senate (1881, 1887) ===
United States Senate Election in Wisconsin, 1881
Party	Candidate	Votes	%
Vote of the 34th Wisconsin Legislature, January 26, 1881
Republican	Philetus Sawyer	98	73.68%
Democratic	James G. Jenkins	29	21.80%
Republican	Cadwallader C. Washburn	2	1.50%
Democratic	Charles D. Parker	1	0.75%
	Absent or not voting	3	2.26%
Plurality		69	51.88%
Total votes		133	100.0%
Republican hold			

United States Senate Election in Wisconsin, 1887
Party	Candidate	Votes	%
Vote of the 37th Wisconsin Legislature, January 26, 1887
Republican	Philetus Sawyer (incumbent)	81	60.90%
Democratic	John Winans	36	27.07%
Labor	John M. Cochrane	6	4.51%
	Absent or not voting	10	7.52%
Plurality		45	33.83%
Total votes		133	100.0%
Republican hold			

== See also ==
- List of mayors of Oshkosh, Wisconsin

Wisconsin State Assembly
Preceded by John Anunson	Member of the Wisconsin State Assembly from the Winnebago 1st district January 5, 1857 – January 4, 1858	Succeeded by Samuel M. Hay
Preceded by Gabriel Bouck	Member of the Wisconsin State Assembly from the Winnebago 1st district January 7, 1861 – January 6, 1862	Succeeded by William E. Hanson
U.S. House of Representatives
Preceded by Ezra Wheeler	Member of the U.S. House of Representatives from Wisconsin's 5th congressional district 1865–1873	Succeeded by Charles A. Eldredge
Preceded by Jeremiah McLain Rusk	Member of the U.S. House of Representatives from Wisconsin's 6th congressional district 1873–1875	Succeeded by Alanson M. Kimball
U.S. Senate
Preceded by Angus Cameron	U.S. senator (Class 1) from Wisconsin; 1881–1893; Served alongside: Angus Cameron, John C. Spooner, William F. Vilas	Succeeded by John L. Mitchell
Preceded by William Pitt Kellogg	Chairman of the Senate Railroad Committee; March 4, 1883 – March 3, 1887	Succeeded by Dwight M. Sabin
Political offices
Preceded by Henry C. Jewell	Mayor of Oshkosh, Wisconsin; April 1863 – April 1865	Succeeded by Carlton Foster
