= Levi E. Knapp =

American politician

Levi E. Knapp (December 5, 1826 – September 13, 1919) was a member of the Wisconsin State Assembly.

== Biography ==
Knapp was born on December 5, 1826, in Sherburne, New York. In 1852, he settled in Oshkosh, Wisconsin. He died there on September 13, 1919.

== Career ==
Knapp was a member of the Assembly during the 1877 and 1878 sessions. Previously, he had been a member of the county board of Winnebago County, Wisconsin from 1872 to 1875. He was a Republican.
