= Leonard P. Crary =

American politician

Leonard P. Crary was a member of the Wisconsin State Assembly during the 1848 and 1850 sessions. He originally represented a Milwaukee County, Wisconsin district and later Winnebago County, Wisconsin. Other positions he held include serving as a Milwaukee, Wisconsin alderman. Crary was a Democrat.
