= William Wall (Wisconsin politician) =

American politician (1836–1844)

William Wall (1836–1884) was a member of the Wisconsin State Assembly.

== Biography ==
Wall was born on May 9, 1836. During the American Civil War, he served with the 21st Wisconsin Volunteer Infantry Regiment of the Union Army, achieving the rank of captain. Wall married Caroline Hewitt (1838–1880). He died four years after his wife at the age of 48 on June 2, 1884. Their grave is in Oshkosh, Wisconsin.

== Assembly career ==
Wall was a member of the Assembly during the 1879, 1880 and 1881 sessions. He was a Republican.
