= James B. McLeran =

American politician

James B. McLeran was a member of the Wisconsin State Assembly. Born in Orange County, Vermont in 1847, McLeran settled in Wisconsin in 1867. He was an insurance agent. Elected in 1886 on the Union Labor ticket, he served only one term.
