= Return Torrey =

American politician

Return Delos Torrey (March 24, 1835 – November 2, 1893) was an American miller from Oshkosh, Wisconsin, who spent one two-year term (1877–1878) as a member of the Wisconsin State Senate from the 19th District (Winnebago County).

Torrey was born in Madison, Ohio. He moved to Fall River, Wisconsin, in 1850, then to Neenah, Wisconsin, in 1861. In 1871, Torrey moved to Oshkosh, Wisconsin. He served as county treasurer of Winnebago County, Wisconsin, from 1871 to 1878. He died November 2, 1893, in Chicago, Illinois. He had lived in that city for about ten years, and had become active in its local politics.
