= Luther Buxton =

American politician

Luther Buxton (October 12, 1822 – August 23, 1897) was an American physician and politician.

Born in Danby, Rutland County, Vermont, Buxton graduated from Castleton University and Albany Medical College. In 1849, Buxton served in the New York State Assembly, from Brant, New York, was a physician, and was a Whig. Buxton then moved to Oshkosh, Wisconsin where he continued to practice medicine. In 1860, he was elected superintendent of public instruction. In 1868 and 1869, Buxton served in the Wisconsin State Assembly as a Republican. He was also deputy collector on internal revenue. He moved to Milwaukee, Wisconsin where he died from cancer.
