= Dudley Blodget =

American politician (1820–1856)

Dudley Blodget (also spelled Blodgett; 1820 in Randolph, Vermont – December 1856 in Oshkosh, Wisconsin) was a member of the Wisconsin State Assembly.

On May 1, 1845, he married Mary Granger. They would have four children.

== Career ==
Blodget was a member of the Assembly during the 1852 session. He was a Whig.
