= Asa Rogers (Wisconsin) =

American politician

Asa Rogers (January 22, 1829 – May 31, 1901) was an American carpenter, contractor, and politician in Wisconsin.

Born in the town of Wayne, Steuben County, New York, Rogers settled in Waukau. Winnebago County, Wisconsin Territory in 1845. Rogers was a building contractor and carpenter in Oshkosh, Wisconsin. Rogers served on the Oshkosh Common Council and was a Democrat. In 1875, Rogers served in the Wisconsin State Assembly. Rogers died in Berlin, Wisconsin of pneumonia and typhoid fever.
