= List of people from Oshkosh, Wisconsin =

The following notable people are or have been associated with Oshkosh, Wisconsin.

== Politicians and judiciary ==
- Harvey R. Abraham, Wisconsin state assemblyman
- George R. Andrews, U.S. representative from New York
- Melvin Baldwin, U.S. representative from Minnesota
- Charles A. Barnard, Wisconsin state assemblyman
- Coles Bashford, governor of Wisconsin, U.S. congressional delegate from the Arizona Territory
- Martin T. Battis, Wisconsin state assemblyman and businessman; born in Oshkosh
- Jule Berndt, Wisconsin state assemblyman and Lutheran pastor; born in Oshkosh
- Gabriel Bouck, Wisconsin attorney general
- William M. Bray, Wisconsin state senator
- Richard S. Brown, chief judge of the Wisconsin Court of Appeals
- Shirley Brown, Florida state representative
- Taylor G. Brown, Wisconsin state senator
- Luther Buxton, New York and Wisconsin state legislator and physician
- Frank Challoner, Wisconsin state assemblyman and businessman
- William C. Cowling, Wisconsin state assemblyman
- James H. Davidson, U.S. representative
- James Edward Doyle, U.S. federal court judge
- James Randall Durfee, U.S. federal court judge
- Edward Eastman, bookseller; first postmaster and first mayor of Oshkosh; Wisconsin State Assemblyman
- William Faber, Wisconsin state assemblyman
- Earl Finch, Wisconsin state assemblyman
- Carlton Foster, Wisconsin state assemblyman
- Gary R. Goyke, Wisconsin state senator
- Arthur H. Gruenewald, Wisconsin state assemblyman
- Richard W. Guenther, U.S. representative
- Jon R. Guiles, Wisconsin state assemblyman
- Andrew Haben, Wisconsin state legislator
- Thomas S. Hanson, Wisconsin state assemblyman
- F. Badger Ives, Wisconsin state assemblyman and businessman
- Ron Johnson, U.S. senator for Wisconsin
- Frank B. Keefe, U.S. representative
- Emil Keup, Wisconsin state assemblyman
- Gaines A. Knapp, Wisconsin state assemblyman
- Kenneth Kunde, Wisconsin state assemblyman
- Florian Lampert, U.S. representative
- B. F. Langworthy, Minnesota state representative
- Alfred R. Lea, Wisconsin state assemblyman
- Frank A. Leach, Wisconsin state assemblyman
- Freeman Lord, Wisconsin state assemblyman
- Gustav S. Luscher, Wisconsin state assemblyman
- Herman E. Manuel, Wisconsin state assemblyman
- Lucas Miltiades Miller, U.S. representative
- Bernard N. Moran, Wisconsin state senator
- Reid F. Murray, U.S. representative
- Leo T. Niemuth, Wisconsin state assemblyman
- Alvin O'Konski, U.S. representative
- Albert L. Osborn, Wisconsin state assemblyman
- Clark M. Perry, Wisconsin state assemblyman
- Leander J. Pierson, Wisconsin state assemblyman
- George White Pratt, Wisconsin state senator
- Charles Rahr, Wisconsin state assemblyman
- Christian Sarau, Wisconsin state senator
- Philetus Sawyer, politician
- Casper Schmidt, Wisconsin state assemblyman
- Edward M. Schneider, Wisconsin state assemblyman
- Chester D. Seftenberg, Wisconsin state assemblyman
- Floyd E. Shurbert, Wisconsin state assemblyman
- Eber Simpson, Wisconsin state assemblyman
- Janet Dempsey Steiger, politician
- William A. Steiger, U.S. representative
- Walter Tank, Wisconsin state assemblyman
- Return Torrey, miller and Wisconsin state senator
- Gregg Underheim, politician
- Robert Scadden Vessey, governor of South Dakota
- Esther K. Walling, Wisconsin state assemblywoman
- Thomas Wall, Wisconsin businessman and state legislator
- Ganem W. Washburn, Wisconsin state senator and jurist
- Henry I. Weed, Wisconsin state senator
- Dayne Wescott, Wisconsin state senator
- Edwin Wheeler, Wisconsin state senator and jurist
- Alexander B. Whitman, Wisconsin state senator

== Sportspersons ==
- Marty Below, member of the College Football Hall of Fame (1988)
- Cozy Dolan, MLB player
- Dick Erdlitz, NFL player
- Bill Gogolewski, MLB player
- Rudy Gollomb, NFL player
- Tyrese Haliburton, NBA player for the Indiana Pacers
- Billy Hoeft, MLB player
- Hornswoggle, real name Dylan Postl, wrestler
- Peter Konz, NFL player
- Howie Koplitz, MLB player
- Hal Reilly, MLB player
- Dutch Rennert, Major League Baseball umpire
- Ted Richards, NFL player
- Hal Robl, NFL player
- Champ Seibold, NFL player
- Eber Simpson, NFL player
- Len Smith, NFL player
- Dave Tyriver, MLB player

== Military ==
- Harold Medberry Bemis, U.S. Navy admiral
- Charles R. Boardman, served as adjutant general of Wisconsin and as an American general during WWI
- Edmond Konrad, U.S. Navy admiral
- Ernest Dichmann Peek, U.S. Army major general
- William Everett Potter, U.S. Army; served as governor of the Panama Canal Zone
- Steven A. Schaick, U.S. Air Force general; deputy chief of chaplains

== Others ==
- Lee Baxandall, founder of The Naturist Society
- Erin Boheme, musician
- Michelle Grabner, painter
- Mark Gruenwald, Marvel Comics executive editor
- Lewis Hine, photographer
- Jessie Jack Hooper, suffragist, peace activist, first president of the Wisconsin League of Women Voters and Democratic candidate for U.S. Senate
- KennyHoopla, musician
- Arthur C. Lichtenberger, presiding bishop of the Episcopal Church
- Kevin B. MacDonald, evolutionary psychologist at the California State University, Long Beach
- Helen Farnsworth Mears, sculptor
- Mike Melvoin, jazz pianist
- Luanna Meyer, professor of education in New Zealand
- Paul Poberezny, aircraft designer, military aviator and founder of the Experimental Aircraft Association, member of the National Aviation Hall of Fame (1999)
- Tom Poberezny, aerobatic pilot and former chairman and president of the Experimental Aircraft Association, member of the National Aviation Hall of Fame (2016)
- Stevie Rachelle, lead singer of Tuff
- T.J. Rodgers, scientist and entrepreneur
- Cora Folsom Salisbury, vaudeville performer and ragtime composer
- Greg Dean Schmitz, film critic
- Kathie Sullivan, singer
- Baby Doe Tabor, Colorado pioneer
- Dave Truesdale, editor and literary critic
- Jim VandeHei, editor and co-founder of Politico
