= Ephraim E. Stevens =

American politician (1851-1907)

E. E. Stevens

Member of the Wisconsin Senate from the 19th district
- In office January 2, 1905 – January 7, 1907
- Preceded by: Christian Sarau
- Succeeded by: John A. Fridd

27th Mayor of Oshkosh, Wisconsin
- In office April 1889 – April 1890
- Preceded by: Harvey B. Dale
- Succeeded by: George White Pratt

Personal details
- Born: January 12, 1851 Knox, Maine, U.S.
- Died: July 20, 1907 (aged 56) Oshkosh, Wisconsin, U.S.
- Cause of death: Bright's disease
- Resting place: Riverside Cemetery, Oshkosh
- Party: Republican
- Spouse: Margaret Jacobs (m. 1874–1907)
- Children: Grace M. Stevens^{(died 1945)}; Maude Viola (Hoaglin)^{(b. 1877; died 1947)}; Catherine S. (Kilp)^{(b. 1883; died 1971)}; Allie (Kavana)^{(b. 1886; died 1940)}; Elizabeth Stevens^{(b. 1890; died 1944)}

Ephraim Eldorus Stevens (January 12, 1851 – July 20, 1907) was an American architect, Republican politician, and Wisconsin pioneer. He was the 27th mayor of Oshkosh, Wisconsin, and represented Winnebago County in the Wisconsin Senate during the 1905 session. His name was almost always abbreviated as E. E. Stevens in contemporary documents.

== Biography ==
Ephraim Stevens was born in the town of Knox, Maine, in January 1851. When he was an infant, he came with his parents and siblings to Oshkosh, Wisconsin, where he would live out the rest of his life. He was educated in the public schools and studied masonry. In 1868, he went to Green Bay, Wisconsin, where he apprenticed in under architect D. M. Harteau, and later partnered with him in the firm Harteau & Stevens.

He returned to Oshkosh and became one of the more prominent architects in the city, responsible for a number of schools and public buildings.

He served several years on the Oshkosh city council and was elected mayor of Oshkosh in 1889, running on the Republican Party ticket. Stevens convinced the city to purchase two parks during his term and was known as the "Parks mayor". He was active in the local Republican Party and was chairman of the city and county Republican committees several times.

In August 1903, incumbent state senator Christian Sarau died less than a year into his four-year term. A special election was called for the fall of 1904. Stevens received the county Republican endorsement over incumbent state representative William C. Cowling. Stevens was seen as more in line with the progressive agenda of Governor Robert M. La Follette. He prevailed in the general election with 57% of the vote.

Despite coming into office as a La Follette supporter, he had a falling out with the progressive faction and lost the 1906 primary to John A. Fridd. Stevens chose to run as an Independent Republican, but came in a distant 3rd in the 1906 general election.

A short time after the 1906 election, Stevens began suffering from bronchitis, followed by pneumonia. By May, he was bedridden and died July 20, 1907.

== Personal life and legacy ==
Ephraim was one of six children born to Hiram and Rosella (née Cross) Stevens. Hiram Stevens was involved in the lumber industry in Oshkosh, but enlisted for service in the Union Army during the American Civil War. He served with the 3rd Wisconsin Cavalry Regiment but was discharged due to disease after one year of service and died four months later, in March 1863.

He married Margaret Jacobs on February 23, 1974. They had five daughters together, who all survived him.

Stevens Park in Oshkosh is named in his honor.

== Electoral history ==
=== Wisconsin Senate (1904, 1906) ===
Wisconsin Senate, 19th District Election, 1904
Party	Candidate	Votes	%	±%
General Election, November 8, 1904
Republican	E. E. Stevens	6,923	57.46%	+4.97%
Democratic	A. C. McComb	4,819	40.00%	−2.36%
Prohibition	W. E. Monroe	307	2.55%	−0.24%
Plurality		2,104	17.46%	+4.97%
Total votes		12,049	100.0%	+7.17%
Republican hold				

Wisconsin Senate, 19th District Election, 1906
Party	Candidate	Votes	%	±%
General Election, November 2, 1906
Republican	John A. Fridd	4,591	51.30%	−6.16%
Democratic	J. Harrington	3,310	36.99%	−3.01%
Independent Republican	E. E. Stevens (incumbent)	1,048	11.71%	
Plurality		1,281	14.31%	-3.15%
Total votes		8,949	100.0%	-25.73%
Republican hold				

== See also ==
- List of mayors of Oshkosh, Wisconsin

Wisconsin Senate
Preceded by Christian Sarau	Member of the Wisconsin Senate from the 19th district January 2, 1905 – January 7, 1907	Succeeded by John A. Fridd
Political offices
Preceded by Harvey B. Dale	Mayor of Oshkosh, Wisconsin; April 1889 – April 1890	Succeeded by George White Pratt
