= Lampert =

Lampert is a surname of Western European origin, possibly from an Old Frankish name for the Lombards. It is also a given name. Bearers of the name include:

== People ==
=== Given name ===
Ordered chronologically

- Lambert of Hersfeld (c. 1024–1082/85), German historian
- Lampert of Hungary (c. 1040–c. 1095), Hungarian prince
- Lampert Hont-Pázmány (lord) (1060s–1132), Hungarian lord
- Lampert Hont-Pázmány (bishop) (died 1275), Hungarian prelate
- Lampert Hermán (died 1324), Hungarian nobleman
- Lampert Distelmeyer (1522–1588), German jurist and Chancellor of Mark Brandenburg

=== Surname ===
Ordered alphabetically

- Alois Lampert (1932–1977), Liechtensteiner cyclist
- Andrzej Lampert (born 1981), Polish singer
- Carl Lampert (1894–1944), Austrian Roman Catholic priest, saint and critic of Nazism during World War II
- Dietmar Lampert (born 1966), Liechtenstein politician
- Eddie Lampert (born 1962), American businessman
- Emma Lampert Cooper (1855–1920), American painter
- Eugene Lampert (1914–2004), Scholar of Russian history and theology
- Florian Lampert (1863–1930), American politician
- Gerald Lampert, Canadian arts administrator and the namesake of the Gerald Lampert Award
- Harry Lampert (1916–2004), American cartoonist and contract bridge author
- Irwin Lampert, Canadian judge
- Jacob Lampert (1856–1921), English-American cigar manufacturer
- James Benjamin Lampert (1914–1978), American general
- Khen Lampert, Israeli author and philosopher
- Laurence Lampert, (born c. 1943), Canadian philosopher and Nietzsche scholar
- Michael Stephen Lampert, American schoolteacher
- Peter Lampert (1951–2015), Liechtenstein politician
- Rudolf Lampert (1956–2021), Liechtenstein politician
- Vince Lampert (born 1963), American Roman Catholic priest and exorcist
- Wendelin Lampert (born 1970), Liechtenstein politician
- Zohra Lampert (fl. 1954–2016), American actress

== See also ==
- Lamberg
- Lambert (name)
- Lambertus
- Lamprecht (name)
