= Hubertus (disambiguation) =

Hubertus (Hubert of Liège) was a Christian saint and the first Bishop of Liège.

Hubertus may also refer to:

== People ==
=== Royalty and nobility ===
- Carl Gustaf Folke Hubertus (born 1946), King of Sweden
- Hubertus, Prince of Löwenstein-Wertheim-Freudenberg (1906–1984), German historian and political figure
- Prince Hubertus of Hohenlohe-Langenburg (born 1959), Mexican alpine skier
- Prince Hubertus of Prussia (1909–1950), third son of Crown Prince Wilhelm of Germany and Duchess Cecilie of Mecklenburg-Schwerin
- Prince Hubertus of Saxe-Coburg and Gotha (disambiguation)

=== Other ===
- Hubertus Antonius van der Aa (1935–2017), Dutch mycologist
- Hubertus Albers (born 1965), German comedian
- Hubertus von Amelunxen (born 1958), Swiss art historian
- Hubertus C.M. Baargarst (1909–1985), Dutch boxer with the pseudonym Huub Huizenaar
- Hubertus Bernardus “Huub” Bals (1937–1988), Dutch founder of the International Film Festival Rotterdam
- Hubertus Bengsch (born 1952), German actor
- Hubertus J.A. "Huub" Bertens (born 1960), Dutch bridge player
- Hubertus Christiaan "Hubert" de Blanck (1856–1932), Dutch-born Cuban pianist and composer
- Hubertus von Bonin (1911–1943), German World War II fighter ace
- Hubertus Brandenburg (1923–2009), German Roman Catholic Bishop emeritus of Stockholm
- Hubertus Czernin (1956–2006), Austrian investigative journalist
- Hubertus Ernst (1917–2017), Dutch Roman Catholic Bishop
- Hubertus-Maria Ritter von Heigl (1897–1985), German general during World War II
- Hubertus Goltzius (1526–1583), Flemish painter, engraver, and printer
- Hubertus Grimani (1562–1651), Dutch painter
- Hubertus Heil (born 1972), German politician
- Hubertus Hitschhold (1912–1966), German general during World War II
- Hubertus Hoffmann (born 1955), German journalist, media manager and investor
- Hubertus van Hove (1814–1865), Dutch painter
- Hubertus K.G. "Huub" Jansen (born 1962), Dutch cricket umpire
- Hubertus Knabe (born 1959), German historian
- Hubertus Lambriex (born 1960), Dutch sailor
- Hubertus Lamey (1896–1981), German general during World War II
- Hubertus van Megen (born 1961), Dutch Roman Catholic nuncio
- Hubertus Johannes van Mook (1894–1965), Dutch administrator in the East Indies
- Hubertus M. Mühlhäuser (born 1969), German businessman
- Hubertus Naich (c.1513–c.1546), Flemish composer active in Rome
- Hubertus G.J.H. "Huub" Oosterhuis (1933–2023), Dutch theologian and poet
- Hubertus von Pilgrim (1931–2026), German sculptor, printmaker, and medallist
- Hubertus Primus (born 1955), German lawyer, journalist and manager
- Hubertus Quellinus (1619–1687), Flemish printmaker, draughtsman and painter
- Hubertus Regout (born 1969), Belgian-born German actor
- Hubertus Reulandt (1590–1661), Luxembourgish printer
- Hubertus "Huub" Rothengatter (born 1954), Dutch racing driver
- Hubertus Schmidt (born 1959), German equestrian
- Hubertus W.J.M. "Huub" Stapel (born 1954), Dutch actor
- Hubertus K.G. "Huub" Stevens (born 1953), Dutch football player and manager
- Hubertus Strughold (1898–1986), German-born American physiologist and Nazi physician
- Hubertus Zilverberg (born 1939), Dutch road bicycle racer

=== Fictional characters ===
- Hubertus Bigend, a character in the novel Pattern Recognition

== Other ==
- Hubertus, Wisconsin, United States
- International Order of St. Hubertus, knightly hunting organization
- Subaru Legacy Hubertus 2, a trim level offered on the German-spec Subaru Legacy wagon starting in 1992
- Hubertus Spring, spring in the Harz Mountains in Germany
