= George A. Buckstaff =

19th century American politician

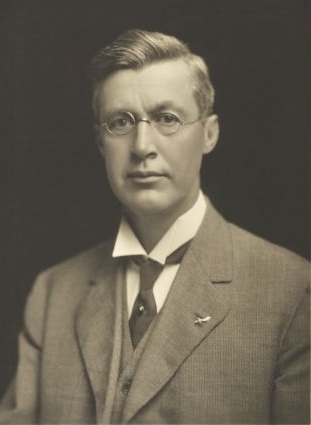
- Photo from the Wisconsin Historical Society

43rd Speaker of the Wisconsin State Assembly
- In office January 4, 1897 – January 2, 1899
- Preceded by: George B. Burrows
- Succeeded by: George H. Ray

Member of the Wisconsin State Assembly
- In office January 4, 1897 – January 2, 1899
- Preceded by: August C. Thalacker
- Succeeded by: F. Badger Ives
- Constituency: Winnebago 1st district
- In office January 7, 1895 – January 4, 1897
- Preceded by: Frank T. Tucker
- Succeeded by: Frank T. Tucker
- Constituency: Winnebago 3rd district

Personal details
- Born: December 22, 1861 Oshkosh, Wisconsin, U.S.
- Died: September 26, 1927 (aged 65) Oshkosh, Wisconsin, U.S.
- Resting place: Ellenwood Cemetery, Oshkosh, Wisconsin
- Party: Republican
- Spouse: Florence Tyng Griswold
- Children: David H. Buckstaff^{(died 1899)}; Florence B. (Lamb)^{(b. 1889; died 1969)}; Majel (Leary)^{(b. 1891; died 1930)}; Angus Griswold Buckstaff^{(b. 1896; died 1960)}; Sherwood Buckstaff^{(b. 1901; died 1982)}
- Relatives: George H. Buckstaff (uncle)
- Education: Wisconsin State University–Oshkosh; Columbia Law School; University of Wisconsin Law School

George Angus Buckstaff (December 22, 1861 – September 26, 1927) was an American lawyer, businessman, and Republican politician. He was the 43rd Speaker of the Wisconsin State Assembly.

== Biography ==
George Buckstaff was born December 22, 1861, at Oshkosh, Wisconsin. He attended the public schools at Oshkosh, and then attended the Wisconsin State University at Oshkosh from 1882 to 1885. He graduated from Columbia Law School and the University of Wisconsin Law School in 1886. He was admitted to the bar later that year and went to work for the Buckstaff-Edwards casket and furniture manufacturing company, which was partly owned by his father. He was appointed secretary of the company and manager of the chair department.

In 1894, he was elected to the Wisconsin State Assembly from Winnebago County's 3rd Assembly district, which then comprised the southern half of the county. A legislative redistricting plan was passed during the 1895–1896 session. In the 1896 election, Buckstaff was elected to another term in the Assembly from the new Winnebago 1st Assembly district—then comprising just the city of Oshkosh. At the start of the 1897 session, he was chosen as speaker of the Assembly with a bipartisan vote of 91 out of 100 members.

He chose not to run for re-election in 1898 and instead ran for Wisconsin State Senate, challenging incumbent Charles W. Davis for the Republican nomination. At the Winnebago County convention in September, Buckstaff defeated Davis on the first ballot, taking 77 votes to Davis' 35. In the general election, however, Buckstaff fell 133 votes short of his Democratic opponent, Henry I. Weed.

Buckstaff's became president of the Buckstaff Company after the death of his father in 1900. He devoted most of the remainder of his career to the management of the company.

In his later years, he served on a number of appointed state commissions. During World War I, he served on the Governor's council on defense and the liberty loan commission. He also served on the state Fish & Game Commission and introduced the law to abolish net fishing in Lake Winnebago. He also successfully lobbied the U.S. Army Corps of Engineers to take steps to control flooding at Lake Winnebago and the Fox and Wolf rivers.

== Personal life and family ==
George Buckstaff was the son of Canadian American immigrant John Buckstaff, Jr. John Buckstaff and his brothers were prominent lumbermen and pioneers in the Oshkosh area before going into the shingle and furniture manufacturing business. George Angus Buckstaff's uncle George H. Buckstaff also served in the Wisconsin State Assembly and State Senate.

== Electoral history ==
=== Wisconsin Assembly (1894, 1896) ===
Wisconsin Assembly, Winnebago 3rd District Election, 1894
Party	Candidate	Votes	%	±%
General Election, November 6, 1894
Republican	George A. Buckstaff	2,749	68.10%	+10.92%
Democratic	Leo L. Larrabee	1,036	25.66%	−17.17%
Populist	Nick Becker	252	6.24%	
Plurality		1,713	42.43%	+28.09%
Total votes		4,037	100.0%	-2.70%
Republican hold				

Wisconsin Assembly, Winnebago 1st District Election, 1896
Party	Candidate	Votes	%	±%
General Election, November 3, 1896
Republican	George A. Buckstaff	2,487	54.91%	+0.12%
Democratic	D. W. Fernandez	2,042	45.09%	+11.51%
Plurality		445	9.83%	-11.39%
Total votes		4,529	100.0%	+22.24%
Republican hold				

=== Wisconsin Senate (1898) ===
Wisconsin Senate, 19th District Election, 1898
Party	Candidate	Votes	%	±%
General Election, November 8, 1898
Democratic	Henry I. Weed	5,269	49.35%	+17.17%
Republican	George A. Buckstaff	5,136	48.11%	−8.90%
Prohibition	Carlos Judson	271	2.54%	−0.67%
Plurality		133	1.25%	-23.58%
Total votes		10,676	100.0%	-7.66%
Democratic gain from Republican				

Wisconsin State Assembly
Preceded by Frank T. Tucker	Member of the Wisconsin State Assembly]] from the Winnebago 3rd district January 7, 1895 – January 4, 1897	Succeeded by Frank T. Tucker
Preceded by August C. Thalacker	Member of the Wisconsin State Assembly]] from the Winnebago 1st district January 4, 1897 – January 2, 1899	Succeeded by F. Badger Ives
Preceded by George B. Burrows	Speaker of the Wisconsin State Assembly; January 4, 1897 – January 2, 1899	Succeeded by George H. Ray
