= George Buckstaff =

George Buckstaff may refer to:

- George H. Buckstaff (1837–1913), Canadian American immigrant, lumberman, and politician in Wisconsin
- George A. Buckstaff (1861–1927), his nephew, American lawyer, businessman, and politician in Wisconsin
