= Bertus =

Bertus is a given name and surname. Notable persons with that name include:

== Persons with the given name ==
- Bertus Aafjes (1914–1993), Dutch poet
- Bertus Borgers (born 1947), Dutch musician
- Bertus Brouwer (1881–1966), Dutch mathematician and philosopher
- Bertus Caldenhove (1914–1983), Dutch association football player
- Bertus de Harder (1920–1982), Dutch association football player
- Bertus Erasmus (born 1977), Zimbabwean cricketer
- Bertus O'Callaghan (born 1988), Namibian rugby union player
- Bertus Basson South African chef and restaurateur
- Bertus Nuganab Namibian profiler and lawyer by profession

== Persons with the surname ==
- Paul Bertus, American politician
- Lajos Bertus (born 1990), Hungarian association football player

== See also ==
- Bert (name)
- Albertus (given name)
- Lambertus
- Hubertus (disambiguation)
