= Christian Sarau =

German-American politician (1839–1903)

Member of the Wisconsin Senate from the 19th district
- In office January 5, 1903 – August 24, 1903
- Preceded by: Henry I. Weed
- Succeeded by: Ephraim Stevens

Member of the Wisconsin State Assembly from the Winnebago 3rd district
- In office January 2, 1899 – January 5, 1903
- Preceded by: Frank T. Tucker
- Succeeded by: John A. Fridd

Personal details
- Born: June 7, 1839 Segeberg, Holstein
- Died: August 24, 1903 (aged 64) Oshkosh, Wisconsin, U.S.
- Cause of death: Accidental death
- Resting place: Riverside Cemetery, Oshkosh, Wisconsin
- Party: Republican
- Spouse: Augusta Sarau (died 1882)

Christian Sarau (June 7, 1839 – August 24, 1903) was a German American immigrant, attorney, and Republican politician. He served four years in the Wisconsin State Assembly, representing the Oshkosh area, and was in his first year in the Wisconsin State Senate when he was killed in an accident in 1903.

== Biography ==
Sarau was born on June 7, 1839, in Segeberg, in what was then the Duchy of Holstein, which was under Danish rule but also part of the German Confederation. He moved with his parents to the United States in 1848, settling in Mishicot, Wisconsin. In 1854, he moved to Oshkosh, Wisconsin. He was assessor and then justice of the peace in Oshkosh. Sarau was admitted to the Wisconsin Bar in 1878 and was court commissioner. He died on August 24, 1903, after being struck by a street car while marching in a Knights of Pythias parade in Oshkosh, Wisconsin.

== Career ==
Sarau was a member of the Assembly in 1899 and of the Senate from 1903 until his death. He was a Republican.

Wisconsin State Assembly
Preceded by Frank T. Tucker	Member of the Wisconsin State Assembly from the Winnebago 3rd district January 2, 1899 – January 5, 1903	Succeeded by John A. Fridd
Wisconsin Senate
Preceded by Henry I. Weed	Member of the Wisconsin Senate from the 19th district January 5, 1903 – August 24, 1903	Succeeded by Ephraim Stevens
