= Lamberth =

Lamberth is a surname. Notable people with the surname include:

- Royce Lamberth (born 1943), American judge
- William Lamberth (born 1977), American politician

== See also ==
- Lambert (name)
