= Lambertus =

Lambertus is a Latinized version of the Germanic masculine given name Lambert. In the Low Countries and South Africa it has been in use as a birth name. Most people used short forms in daily life, like Bert, Bertus, Lambert, Lamme, and Lammert. People with this name include:

Latinized names

- Lambertus (fl. 1270), author of the Ars musica
- Lambertus Ardensis (c.1160–aft.1203), French chronicler
- Lambertus Ascafnaburgensis (c.1024–c.1088), German chronicler
- Lambertus Danaeus (c.1535–c.1590), French jurist and Calvinist theologian
- Lambertus de Latiniaco, 13th-century French logician
- Lambertus de Monte (1430/5–1499), Dutch scholastic and Thomist

Birth name

- Lambertus Aafjes (1914–1993), Dutch poet
- Lambertus Jozef Bakker (1912–1969), Dutch writer and publisher
- Lambertus Johannes Hermanus Becht (born 1956), Dutch businessman
- Lambertus Benenga (1886–1963), Dutch swimmer
- Lambertus Bos (1670–1717), Dutch linguist
- Lambertus Johannes Folkert Broer (1916–1991), Dutch physicist and mathematician
- Lambertus Doedes (1878–1955), Dutch sailor
- Lambertus van Gelder (born 1983), Dutch gymnast specializing in the rings
- Lambertus Johannes Hansen (1803–1859), Dutch painter
- Lambertus de Harder (1920–1982), Dutch footballer
- Lambertus van Klaveren (1907–1992), Dutch boxer
- Lambertus van Marwijk (born 1952), Dutch football manager and player
- Lambertus Neher (1889–1967), Dutch government minister and World War II Resistance member
- Lambertus Nienhuis (1873–1960), Dutch ceramist, designer and jewelry designer
- Lambertus J.J. van Nistelrooij (born 1953), Dutch CDA politician and MEP
- Lambertus Nicodemus Palar (1900–1981), Indonesian diplomat
- Lambertus Roelof Schierbeek (1918–1996), Dutch writer
- Lambertus Johannes Toxopeus (1894–1951), Dutch lepidopterist on Java
- Lambertus de Vos (fl.1563–1574), Flemish painter in Constantinople

People with the middle name Lambertus

- Court Lambertus van Beyma (1753–1820), Dutch leader of the Frisian patriots
- Antonius Lambertus Maria Hurkmans (born 1944), Dutch bishop
- John Lambertus Romer (1680–1754), British military engineer
- Alidius Warmoldus Lambertus Tjarda van Starkenborgh Stachouwer (1888–1978), Dutch nobleman and statesman

== See also ==
- Lamberg
- Lambert (name)
- Lampert
- Lamprecht (surname)
