= George H. Ray =

American politician (1847–1910)

40th Speaker of the Wisconsin State Assembly
- In office January 11, 1899 – January 5, 1903
- Preceded by: George A. Buckstaff
- Succeeded by: Irvine Lenroot

Member of the Wisconsin State Assembly from the La Crosse 1st district
- In office January 7, 1895 – January 2, 1905
- Preceded by: Alfred August Leissring
- Succeeded by: John S. Durland

Personal details
- Born: October 4, 1847 St. Stephen, New Brunswick, Canada
- Died: October 31, 1910 (aged 63) La Crosse, Wisconsin, U.S.
- Resting place: Oak Grove Cemetery, La Crosse, Wisconsin
- Party: Republican
- Spouse: Harriet Maria Johnson (m. 1880–1910)
- Children: Richard Johnson Ray^{(b. 1881; died 1948)}; Anne Louise (Cargill)^{(b. 1888; died 1976)}; Robert Gardiner Ray^{(b. 1890; died 1982)}; Harriette Gertrude Ray^{(b. 1892; died 1964)}; John Henry Ray^{(b. 1904; died 1976)}
- Occupation: Businessman, banker

George H. Ray (October 4, 1847 – October 31, 1910) was a Canadian American immigrant, businessman, and Republican politician. He was the 40th speaker of the Wisconsin State Assembly, and represented the city of La Crosse in the Assembly for five terms. He was also chairman of the La Crosse County board of supervisors.

== Biography ==
Ray was born on October 4, 1847, in St. Stephen, New Brunswick. He died on October 31, 1910.

== Career ==
Ray was first elected to the Assembly in 1894. He served as Speaker during the 1899 and 1901 sessions. Previously, he had been a member of the Gardiner, Maine, City Council. Additionally, Ray was a member of the La Crosse County, Wisconsin, serving as Chairman for two years. He was a Republican.

Wisconsin State Assembly
Preceded by Alfred August Leissring	Member of the Wisconsin State Assembly from the La Crosse 1st district January 7, 1895 – January 2, 1905	Succeeded by John S. Durland
Preceded by George A. Buckstaff	Speaker of the Wisconsin State Assembly; January 11, 1899 – January 5, 1903	Succeeded by Irvine Lenroot
