= Lambert (name) =

Lambert is an English and French given name and surname. It is from the Low German form of the anthroponymic name Landberht from the Old High German land "(home) land" and beraht "bright".

It is one of the most common French surnames with a total number of birth in France between 1966 and 1990 around 18,000 births. variant forms include: Lamberty, Lambertot, Lamberton.

== Geographical distribution ==
As of 2014, 36.1% of all known bearers of the surname Lambert were residents of the United States (frequency 1:3,039), 26.4% of France (1:765), 8.5% of England (1:1,983), 7.3% of Canada (1:1,533), 4.9% of Belgium (1:705), 2.8% of Australia (1:2,604), 2.4% of Nigeria (1:22,741), 1.5% of Germany (1:16,231) and 1.4% of South Africa (1:12,113).

In Belgium, the frequency of the surname was higher than national average (1:705) in Wallonia (1:296).

In France, the frequency of the surname was higher than national average (1:765) in the following regions:

1. Bourgogne-Franche-Comté (1:447)
2. Pays de la Loire (1:508)
3. Grand Est (1:560)
4. Normandy (1:573)
5. Centre-Val de Loire (1:661)
6. Guadeloupe (1:670)
7. French Guiana (1:677)
8. Hauts-de-France (1:715)

== People with the given name ==
- Lambert, Bishop of Ostia (c. 1036–1130), became Pope Honorius II
- Lambert, Margrave of Tuscany (fl. 929–931), also count and duke of Lucca
- Lambert (pianist) (fl. 2014), stage name of German pianist Paul Lambert
- Lambert le Bègue, 12th century Belgian priest
- Lambert de Monte, also known as Lambert of Cologne (1430/5–1499), Dutch scholastic and Thomist
- Lambert of Ardres, (c. 1160–after 1203) 12th century French chronicler
- Lambert of Cologne, also known as Lambert de Monte (1430/5–1499), Dutch scholastic and thomist
- Lambert of Gallura (died 1225), giudice of Gallura, Sardinia
- Lambert of Hersfeld (c. 1024–c. 1088), Thuringian chronicler
- Lambert of Maastricht (c. 636 – c. 700), bishop, saint, and martyr
- Lambert of St-Bertin or Lambert of St-Omer (c. 1060–1125), medieval encyclopedist
- Lambert I of Louvain (c. 950–1015), count of Leuven
- Lambert II of Louvain (1041–1063), count of Leuven
- Lambert I of Nantes (fl. 818–836), count of Nantes and duke of Spolete
- Lambert II of Nantes (fl. 843–851), count of Nantes
- Lambert III of Nantes (fl. 851–862), pretender to the County of Nantes
- Lambert I of Spoleto (died 880), duke and margrave of Spoleto
- Lambert II of Spoleto (c. 880–898), Holy Roman Emperor
- Lambert II, Count of Lens (died 1054), count of Lens
- Lambert-Sigisbert Adam (1700–1759), French sculptor
- Lambert Adelot (born 1898, date of death unknown), Belgian field hockey player
- Lambert Heinrich von Babo (1818–1899), German chemist
- Lambert Bartak, American organist
- Lambert Beauduin (1873–1960), Belgian monk, founder of Chevetogne Abbey, Belgium
- Lambert Blackwell Larking (1797–1868), English clergyman and antiquarian
- Lambert Bos (1670–1717), Dutch scholar
- Lambert Cadwalader (1742–1823), American merchant
- Lambert Daneau (c.1535–c.1590), French jurist and Calvinist theologian
- Lambert Ferri (fl. c. 1250–1300), trouvère and cleric at the monastery at Saint-Léonard, Pas-de-Calais
- Lambert Folkers (died 1761), Nova Scotia politician
- Lambert Grimaldi (1420–1494), Lord of Monaco
- Lambert Hamel (1940–2026), German actor and voice actor
- Lambert Hillyer (1889–1969), American director and screenwriter
- Lambert Hitchcock (1795–1852), American furniture manufacturer
- Lambert Lombard (1505–1566), painter and architect from the Low Countries
- Lambert Mascarenhas, 20th century Indian journalist
- Lambert McKenna (1870–1956), Irish scholar, editor and lexicographer
- Lambert Meertens (born 1944), Dutch computer scientist
- Lambert Murphy (1885–1954), American tenor
- Lambert Quetelet (1796–1874), alternate name of Adolphe Quételet, Belgian astronomer, mathematician, statistician and sociologist
- Lambert Redd (1908–1986), American athlete
- Lambert Schaus (1908–1976), Luxembourgian politician
- Lambert Simnel (c. 1477–c. 1525), child pretender to the throne of England
- Lambert Sustris (c. 1515–20–c. 1584), Dutch painter
- Lambert Amon Tanoh (1926–2022), Ivorian politician
- Lambert van Nistelrooij (born 1953), Dutch politician
- Lambert of Vence (1084–1154), Bishop and saint
- Lambert Verdonk (born 1944), Dutch football player
- Sir Lambert Ward, 1st Baronet (1875–1956), British politician
- Lambert Wickes (1735–1777), American Continental Navy Captain
- Lambert Wilson (born 1958), French actor

== People with the surname ==
- Lambert (surname)

== In British peerage ==
- Viscount Lambert, British peerage title created in 1945
- Lambert Baronets, British baronetage title created in 1711

== Fictional characters ==
- Alfred, Chip, Denise, Enid, and Gary Lambert, characters in Jonathan Franzen's 2001 novel "The Corrections"
- Darien Lambert, main character of the series Time Trax
- Eve Lambert, character from the American television series Port Charles
- Garrett Lambert, character from the American television series Community
- Irving Lambert, a major character in the Splinter Cell franchise
- Lambert Strether, character from Henry James's 1903 novel The Ambassadors
- Val Lambert, character from the British soap opera Emmerdale
- Chuck Lambert, character from Season 1 episode 4 ("Phantom Traveller") of "Supernatural"
- Joan Lambert, character from the 1979 film Alien
- Mr. Lambert, Walter White's fake identity in Breaking Bad
- Lambert, character from the 2022 game Cult of the Lamb, though this is a fandom name and not official.
- Lambert, character from "The Witcher" franchise
- Frank, John-Thomas (J.T.), Alicia (Al), and Brendan Lambert, characters from the American television series Step By Step (TV series)
- Skyler Lambert, the maiden name of Skyler White from Breaking Bad

== See also ==
- Lamberg
- Lambertus
- Lampert
- Lamprecht (surname)
