= Florian Lampert =

American politician (1863–1930)

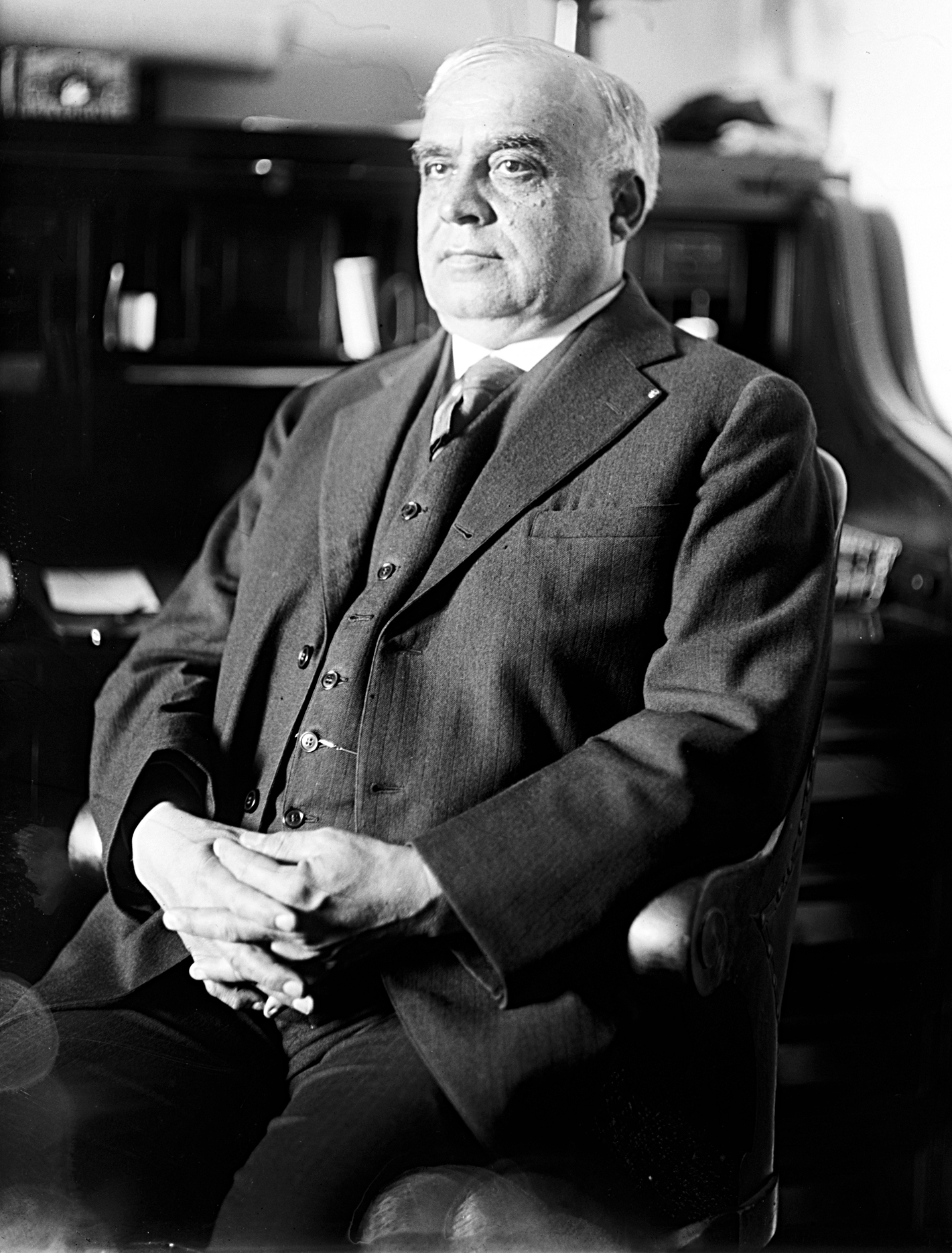
- Library of Congress photo ca.1921

Chairman of the House Committee on Patents
- In office March 4, 1921 – March 4, 1923
- Preceded by: John I. Nolan
- Succeeded by: Albert Henry Vestal

Member of the U.S. House of Representatives from Wisconsin's 6th district
- In office December 2, 1918 – July 18, 1930
- Preceded by: James H. Davidson
- Succeeded by: Michael Reilly

Sheriff of Winnebago County, Wisconsin
- In office January 1, 1897 – January 1, 1899
- Preceded by: Frederick C. Horn
- Succeeded by: Charles M. White

Personal details
- Born: July 8, 1863 West Bend, Wisconsin, U.S.
- Died: July 18, 1930 (aged 67) Chicago Heights, Illinois, U.S.
- Cause of death: Heart attack
- Resting place: Riverside Cemetery, Oshkosh, Wisconsin
- Party: Republican; Bull Moose (1912)
- Spouse: Mary Catherine Vetter (m. 1885–1930)
- Children: 9
- Relatives: James Benjamin Lampert (grandson)

Florian Lampert Jr. (July 8, 1863 – July 18, 1930) was an American businessman and progressive Republican politician from Oshkosh, Wisconsin. He was a member of the U.S. House of Representatives for nearly 12 years, representing Wisconsin's 6th congressional district from December 1918 until his death in 1930. Earlier in his career, he served as sheriff of Winnebago County, Wisconsin.

== Early life ==
Florian Lampert was born on July 8, 1863, in West Bend, Wisconsin, and received his early education in the public schools of that city. His father died in 1875, and he moved with his mother to Oshkosh, Wisconsin. He attended high school for one year there before going to work as a clerk and salesman for a boot and shoe dealer in Oshkosh.

In the early 1880s, he went to work for his elder brother, Mathias (sometimes "Matthew"), who had also gone into the boot and shoe industry. By 1885, Florian Lampert and his brother bought out their business partners and operated their business as "M. Lampert & Co."

== Political career ==
He became involved in politics in his early 20s, and was an active supporter of Republican nominee James G. Blaine in the 1884 United States presidential election.

He made his first run for public office in 1892, running for treasurer of Winnebago County, Wisconsin, but lost the general election by 43 votes. The following spring, he was appointed comptroller of the city of Oshkosh by Mayor Charles Oellerich. He was reappointed in 1895.

In 1896, he was selected by the Winnebago County Republican convention as their nominee for sheriff. He won the nomination on the eighth ballot, and won a two-year term at the general election. Rather than running for re-election in 1898, he sought the Republican nomination for Wisconsin Senate in the 19th Senate district, but the county convention nominated George A. Buckstaff instead.

For the next several years, Lampert did not seek elected office, but was active in political affairs as a supporter of progressive Republican Robert M. "Fighting Bob" La Follette, who became governor in 1901. During La Follette's terms as governor, Lampert's brother Mathias was employed as a clerk for the state Department of Public Lands, and Lampert himself was also employed for temporary service assisting in land sales. In late 1904, Florian Lampert sought appointment as state game warden, and was at that time described as the leader of the La Follette Republicans in Winnebago County. La Follette, however, eventually appointed Jonas Swenholt instead.

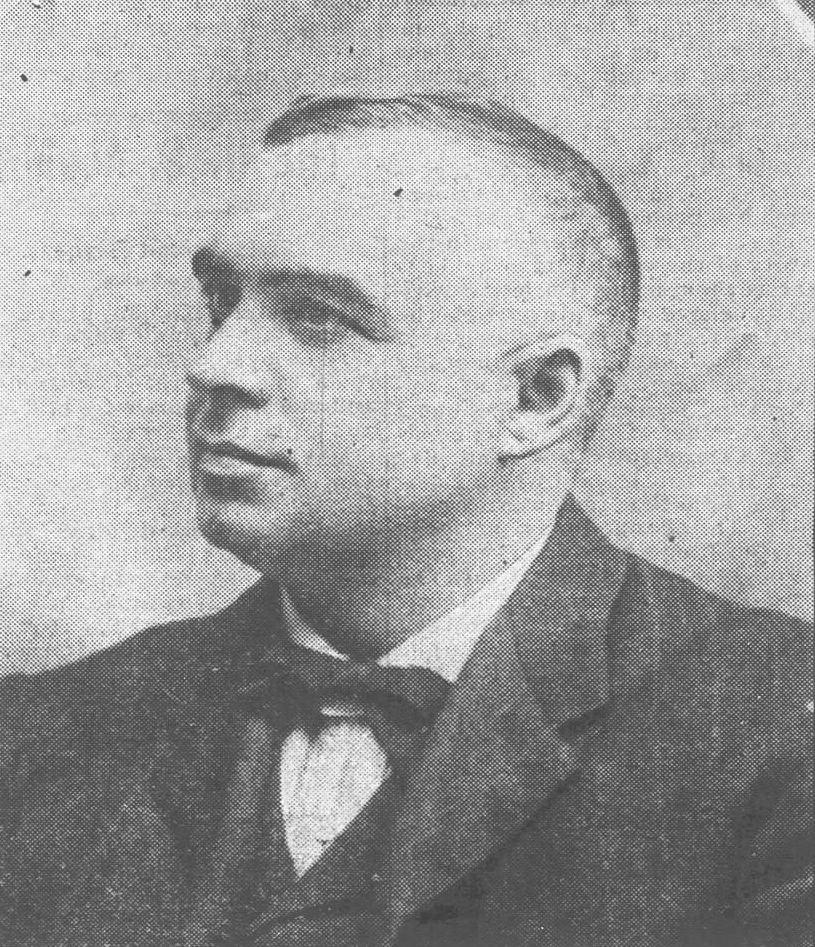
Photo from the Neenah Times, June 16, 1906.

In 1906, Lampert sought nomination to run again for sheriff of Winnebago County. By then, Wisconsin had adopted the primary election system, replacing the old system of nominating conventions. Lampert faced a crowded primary, with six opponents for the Republican nomination. Lampert ultimately came in second, behind Joachim Rhyner.

By 1907, La Follette had become a U.S. senator, and Lampert sought his support for another job. Lambert wanted to be appointed United States Marshal for the Eastern District of Wisconsin, but again did not receive the position. Despite these disappointments, Lampert remained a dedicated partisan for La Follette; he sought election to the 1908 Republican National Convention as a La Follette delegate, but was not elected. Lampert was ultimately appointed as an alternate to the convention by the state Republican Central Committee, and ended up standing in for elected delegate Thomas Torrison, who was unable to attend. That fall, Lampert was then also chosen by the state party as a member of their presidential elector slate, and—since the Republican, Taft, won Wisconsin—Lampert served as one of Wisconsin's 13 presidential electors in the 1908 United States presidential election. Lampert also was given the honor of carrying the official votes of Wisconsin's electors to Washington, D.C., for the formal tabulation of the electoral college.

Over the next several years, he served as a commissioner on the city police and fire board, and ran for a seat on the city commission in 1912, but narrowly lost the general election. He attended the 1912 Republican National Convention, but was not a delegate that year. Later that year, he ultimately joined the short-lived Bull Moose Party supporting Theodore Roosevelt for the presidency—Lampert was a member of the state central committee for the Progressive Party. Lampert was standing near Roosevelt when he was shot in an attempted assassination in Milwaukee on October 14, 1912. Lampert was selected for the Bull Moose electoral slate, but Roosevelt lost the state of Wisconsin in the general election.

In 1914, Lampert ran again for city commissioner. This time he won the seat, but the election was described by newspapers as particularly bitter between him and his opponent, incumbent commissioner Henry Kitz. At the time, Oshkosh had a hybrid city commission form of government, consisting of a mayor and two commissioners, all elected at large.

== Congress ==
Wisconsin's 6th congressional district 1912–1931

At the start of his fifth year as city commissioner, Lampert announced his candidacy for U.S. House of Representatives in Wisconsin's 6th congressional district. Lampert led a revolt of district Republicans in a primary challenge against the incumbent Republican U.S. representative James H. Davidson. Opposition to Davidson reached a crescendo when he was one of 50 members of the House who voted against the declaration of war against Germany. After Lampert demonstrated strong support at county conventions, Davidson decided to withdraw from the race. A month later, Davidson was dead after a brief illness. His death necessitated a special election to fill the remainder of his term in the 65th Congress and it was decided to hold the special election concurrent with the fall general election.

After Davidson's exit and death, Lampert still faced three opponents in the Republican primary. Lampert won the primary thanks to a large plurality from his home Winnebago County. In the midst of the general election campaign, Lampert was still active in his city commission duties, and supported strict quarantine measures in response to the Spanish flu pandemic.

At the November 5 general election, Lampert won both the regular election and the special election for the 6th congressional district. He was sworn in December 2, 1918.

Lampert's first full term was uneventful; he faced a primary challenge from state senator Julius H. Dennhardt in 1920, but prevailed by a wide margin. He won a landslide in the general election, taking nearly 69% of the vote. In the 67th Congress, Lampert was appointed chairman of the House Committee on Patents. He authored and pushed through the Patent Act of 1922, increasing the powers of the patent commissioner and funding 49 new technical examiner positions for the United States Patent and Trademark Office. He faced another primary challenge in 1922, but again soundly defeated his stalwart opponent, state senator William A. Titus. Lampert won another landslide in the general election, receiving over 86% of the vote against independent Democrat William E. Cavanaugh.

Lampert won three more terms, always receiving large electoral majorities. As a representative, Lampert devoted much time and effort to the handling of applications for veterans' pensions and other constituent services. He was also active in securing public improvements for his district and served on the committee that framed much of the early aviation legislation.

== Death ==
On July 8, 1930, Lampert was involved in a serious car accident in Chicago. He was being driven back to Oshkosh when his car struck a coal truck on a slippery road. He was taken to a hospital in Chicago Heights, Illinois, and initially seemed likely to recover. His condition was complicated by pneumonia and he ultimately suffered a fatal heart attack on July 18, 1930.

His remains were interred at Riverside Cemetery in Oshkosh.

== Personal life and family ==
Florian Lampert Jr. was the youngest of four children born to Florian Lampert Sr. and his wife Anna Katherina. Both parents were Swiss American immigrants, they came to the United States in the 1840s and were pioneers of the area of West Bend, Wisconsin. Florian Lampert Sr. was a mason and building contractor responsible for much of the early construction in West Bend.

On May 4, 1885, Florian Lampert Jr. married Mary Catherine Vetter, of Sheboygan County, Wisconsin. They had nine children together, though two died in infancy. All five of their surviving sons served in the United States armed forces during World War I, beginning a tradition of military service that extended to their grandsons.

Their eldest son, James Gillespie Blaine Lampert, was a graduate of the United States Military Academy at West Point and was a career U.S. Army officer. He served with the 1st U.S. Engineer Regiment in France and rose to the rank of lieutenant colonel, but died of disease before returning home from Europe in January 1919.

James G. B. Lampert's son, James Benjamin Lampert, also became a career U.S. Army officer with the United States Army Corps of Engineers, was decorated for service in the Pacific War during World War II, and rose to the rank of lieutenant general. Later in his career, he served three years as Superintendent of the United States Military Academy, and served as high commissioner of the United States Civil Administration of the Ryukyu Islands.

Florian Lambert's third son, Lester Leland Lampert was also a graduate of West Point and was also a career U.S. Army officer. During World War I, he served in France with the 49th U.S. Infantry Division with the rank of major. Late in 1941, he was assigned to Schofield Barracks near Pearl Harbor, and arrived there just weeks before the Japanese surprise attack. His wife, who accompanied him to Hawaii, wrote a first-hand account of her experiences during the attack. Lampert served through most of World War II as a training officer, and was promoted to colonel before retiring.

Lester Lampert's son, Lester Leland Lampert Jr., was also a graduate of West Point and commanded a battalion of the 103rd U.S. Infantry Division during World War II, earning a silver star for conduct during the Battle of the Bulge.

== Electoral history ==
=== U.S. House (1918–1928) ===
Year	Election	Date	Elected				Defeated				Total	Plurality
1918	Primary	Sep. 3	Florian Lampert	Republican	4,607	34.77%	Philip Lehner	Rep.	4,134	31.20%	13,251	473
1918	Primary	Sep. 3	Florian Lampert	Republican	4,607	34.77%	Thomas Higgins	Rep.	2,874	21.69%	13,251	473
1918	Primary	Sep. 3	Florian Lampert	Republican	4,607	34.77%	Charles F. Hart	Rep.	1,626	12.27%	13,251	473
1918	Special	Nov. 5	Florian Lampert	Republican	12,363	41.22%	Bondeul A. Husting	Dem.	10,621	35.41%	29,993	3,026
1918	Special	Nov. 5	Florian Lampert	Republican	12,363	41.22%	G. H. Thompson	Soc.	7,009	23.37%	29,993	3,026
1918	General	Nov. 5	Florian Lampert	Republican	12,728	41.54%	Bondeul A. Husting	Dem.	10,856	35.43%	30,641	1,872
1918	General	Nov. 5	Florian Lampert	Republican	12,728	41.54%	G. H. Thompson	Soc.	6,737	21.99%	30,641	1,872
1918	General	Nov. 5	Florian Lampert	Republican	12,728	41.54%	Byron E. Van Keuren	Proh.	318	1.04%	30,641	1,872
1920	Primary	Sep. 7	Florian Lampert (inc)	Republican	17,170	65.07%	Julius H. Dennhardt	Rep.	9,209	34.90%	26,385	7,961
1920	General	Nov. 2	Florian Lampert (inc)	Republican	38,034	68.70%	Leo P. Fox	Dem.	11,606	20.96%	55,360	26,428
1920	General	Nov. 2	Florian Lampert (inc)	Republican	38,034	68.70%	Edward C. Damrow	Soc.	5,714	10.32%	55,360	26,428
1922	Primary	Sep. 5	Florian Lampert (inc)	Republican	30,588	75.31%	William A. Titus	Rep.	10,020	24.67%	40,615	20,568
1922	General	Nov. 7	Florian Lampert (inc)	Republican	34,365	86.03%	William E. Cavanaugh	Ind.D.	5,572	13.95%	39,944	28,793
1924	Primary	Sep. 2	Florian Lampert (inc)	Republican	21,854	64.99%	W. J. Campbell	Rep.	11,771	35.00%	33,627	10,083
1924	General	Nov. 4	Florian Lampert (inc)	Republican	45,982	70.62%	Michael K. Reilly	Dem.	19,128	29.38%	65,116	26,854
1926	Primary	Sep. 7	Florian Lampert (inc)	Republican	20,513	58.23%	Roy E. Reed	Rep.	10,169	28.86%	33,627	10,083
1926	Primary	Sep. 7	Florian Lampert (inc)	Republican	20,513	58.23%	C. H. Wiese	Rep.	4,548	12.91%	33,627	10,083
1926	General	Nov. 2	Florian Lampert (inc)	Republican	34,445	75.94%	B. F. Sheridan	Dem.	10,895	24.02%	45,359	23,550
1928	General	Nov. 6	Florian Lampert (inc)	Republican	53,952	69.20%	Morley G. Kelly	Dem.	24,009	30.79%	45,359	23,550

== See also ==
- List of members of the United States Congress who died in office (1900–1949)

U.S. House of Representatives
Preceded by James H. Davidson	Member of the U.S. House of Representatives from Wisconsin's 6th congressional district December 2, 1918 – July 18, 1930 (died)	Succeeded by Michael Reilly
Preceded by John I. Nolan	Chairman of the House Committee on Patents; March 4, 1921 – March 4, 1923	Succeeded by Albert Henry Vestal
Legal offices
Preceded by Frederick C. Horn	Sheriff of Winnebago County, Wisconsin; January 1, 1897 – January 1, 1899	Succeeded by Charles M. White
