= Mary Frances Tucker =

American poet

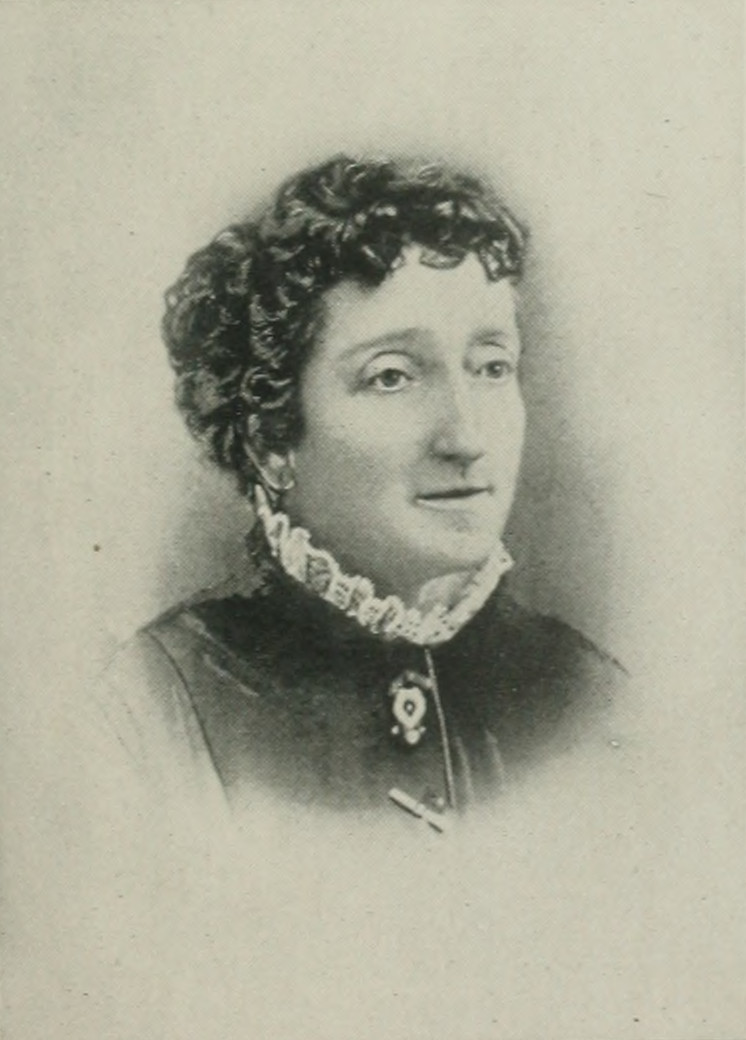
- Photo in A Woman of the Centuryd
- Born: Mary Frances Tyler; May 16, 1837; York, Washtenaw County, Michigan, U.S.
- Died: January 14, 1902 (aged 64); Neillsville, Wisconsin, U.S.
- Resting place: Neillsville City Cemetery
- Occupation: poet
- Spouse: Edward L. Tucker
- Children: Ada; Grace; Frank
- Writing career
- Language: English
- Notable works: "Going Up and Coming Down"; "Cometh a Blessing Down"

Mary Frances Tucker (née, Tyler; May 16, 1837 – 1902) was an American poet. Not a prolific writer, her best work was inspired by a moral sentiment. About the year 1854, two of Tucker's poems appeared in The National Era which soon became popular, and which afterwards, periodically, went the rounds of the press. The one more often printed, perhaps, was "Cometh A Blessing Down". Other notable poems include "Goin Up And Coming Down" (1856) and "Sonnet" (1856).

== Early life ==
Mary Frances Tyler was born in the town of York, Washtenaw County, Michigan, May 16, 1837. In 1849, when she was twelve years old, her family removed to Fulton, New York, where she was reared and carefully educated. She was then a slight, winsome, vivacious girl, with curling golden hair and large expressive gray eyes which, during conversation, fairly glowed and talked in unison with her lips. Her command of language was wonderful, and the right words seemed to come at the right time without hesitation or bidding.

== Career ==
She began composing poetry at an early age, and by the time she was 17, she produced two poems that subsequently became familiar to all readers of literature of that era, "Going Up and Coming Down" and "Cometh a Blessing Down". These poems received favorable comments from George Pope Morris, who copied them into the Home Journal. They were widely reproduced by the press, and generally admired for years afterwards.

On January 6, 1856, she married the physician, Dr. Edward L. Tucker, of Fulton. They removed to Michigan, where they lived until 1863, when Dr. Tucker recruited a cavalry company for a Michigan regiment, and went with them as first lieutenant into active service during the civil war. He died in camp in Chattanooga, Tennessee, and was buried with the honors of war.

Soon after his death, Tucker and her two daughters and son, Frank Tyler Tucker, removed to Omro, Wisconsin. The older daughter, Ada, died in 1880 in Omro. The younger daughter, Grace, became a teacher in Aberdeen, South Dakota. The son, Frank, was for several years the principal of Omro High School. He went on to become a lawyer and political orator in the Northwest.

As a journalist, she achieved considerable distinction, but it is through her poems that she was best known to the literary world. She contributed to the Magazine of Poetry, the Home Journal, the Gazette, and other prominent periodicals.

== Personal life ==
After the death of Ada, Tucker became an invalid, writing only occasionally for publication, and living in semi-retirement.

Mary Frances Tucker died in 1902.

== Selected works ==
=== Books ===
- Poems

=== Poetry ===
- "Cometh a Blessing Down"
- "Goin Up And Coming Down" (1856)
- "Sonnet" (1856)
