= George White Pratt =

19th century American politician

George W. Pratt

23rd & 28th Mayor of Oshkosh, Wisconsin
- In office April 1890 – April 1891
- Preceded by: Ephraim E. Stevens
- Succeeded by: William Dichmann
- In office April 1882 – April 1885
- Preceded by: Joseph Stringham
- Succeeded by: Andrew Haben

Member of the Wisconsin Senate from the 19th district
- In office January 5, 1891 – January 7, 1895
- Preceded by: George H. Buckstaff
- Succeeded by: Charles W. Davis

Member of the Wisconsin State Assembly from the Winnebago 1st district
- In office January 7, 1889 – January 5, 1891
- Preceded by: James B. McLeran
- Succeeded by: Gustav S. Luscher

Personal details
- Born: March 23, 1840 East Haddam, Connecticut, U.S.
- Died: January 17, 1899 (aged 58) Oshkosh, Wisconsin, U.S.
- Party: Democratic
- Spouse: Mary Jeannette Bronson (m. 1867)
- Children: Richard Bronson Pratt^{(b. 1868; died 1948)}; Mary Calista Pratt^{(b. 1870; died 1948)}; George R. Pratt^{(b. 1875; died 1883)}; Emma Jeannette Pratt^{(b. 1882)}; George White Pratt Jr.^{(b. 1887; died 1942)}

George White Pratt (March 23, 1840 – January 17, 1899) was an American businessman and Democratic politician from Oshkosh, Wisconsin. He was the 23rd and 28th mayor of Oshkosh and represented the area for one term each in the Wisconsin Senate (1891–1895) and State Assembly (1889).

== Biography ==
Pratt was born on March 23, 1840, in East Haddam, Connecticut. He moved to Oshkosh, Wisconsin, in 1871, where he "was one of the leading lumber dealers in the state".

== Career ==
Pratt was elected to the Senate in 1890. He was a member of the Assembly the previous year. Additionally, he was Mayor of Oshkosh and a member of the Winnebago County, Wisconsin, as well as a delegate to the 1884 Democratic National Convention.

Pratt died at his home in Oshkosh, after two years of declining health.

Wisconsin State Assembly
| Preceded by James B. McLeran | Member of the Wisconsin State Assembly from the Winnebago 1st district January 7, 1889 – January 5, 1891 | Succeeded by Gustav S. Luscher |
Wisconsin Senate
| Preceded by George H. Buckstaff | Member of the Wisconsin Senate from the 19th district January 5, 1891 – January 7, 1895 | Succeeded by Charles W. Davis |
Political offices
| Preceded by Joseph Stringham | Mayor of Oshkosh, Wisconsin; April 1882 – April 1885 | Succeeded by Andrew Haben |
| Preceded by Ephraim E. Stevens | Mayor of Oshkosh, Wisconsin; April 1890 – April 1891 | Succeeded by William Dichmann |
