= Prince Hubertus =

Prince Hubertus may refer to:

- Hubertus, Prince of Löwenstein-Wertheim-Freudenberg (1906–1984), German historian and political figure
- Prince Hubertus of Saxe-Coburg and Gotha (pilot) (1909–1943), German soldier
- Prince Hubertus of Prussia (1909–1950), third son of Crown Prince Wilhelm of Germany and Duchess Cecilie of Mecklenburg-Schwerin
- Prince Hubertus of Hohenlohe-Langenburg (born 1959), Mexican Alpine skier
- Hubertus Prinz von Sachsen-Coburg und Gotha (born 1961), eldest son of Ernst Leopold Prinz von Sachsen-Coburg und Gotha
- Hubertus Prinz von Sachsen-Coburg und Gotha (born 1975), eldest son of Andreas, Prince of Saxe-Coburg and Gotha
