= Lamprecht (name) =

Other names
- Related names: Lamberg

Lamprecht is a given name and surname. Notable people with the name include:

- Lamprecht, 12th-century German poet
- Chris Lamprecht (fl. 1990s), American hacker, first person to be banned from the Internet
- Christopher Lamprecht (b. 1985), German football player
- Frank Lamprecht (b. 1968), German chess International Master
- Günter Lamprecht (1930–2022), German actor
- Gerhard Lamprecht (1897–1974), German director
- Karl Gotthard Lamprecht (1856–1915), German historian

== See also ==
- Lamberg
- Lambert (name)
- Lambertus
- Lampert
