= Donald V. Bennett =

United States Army general

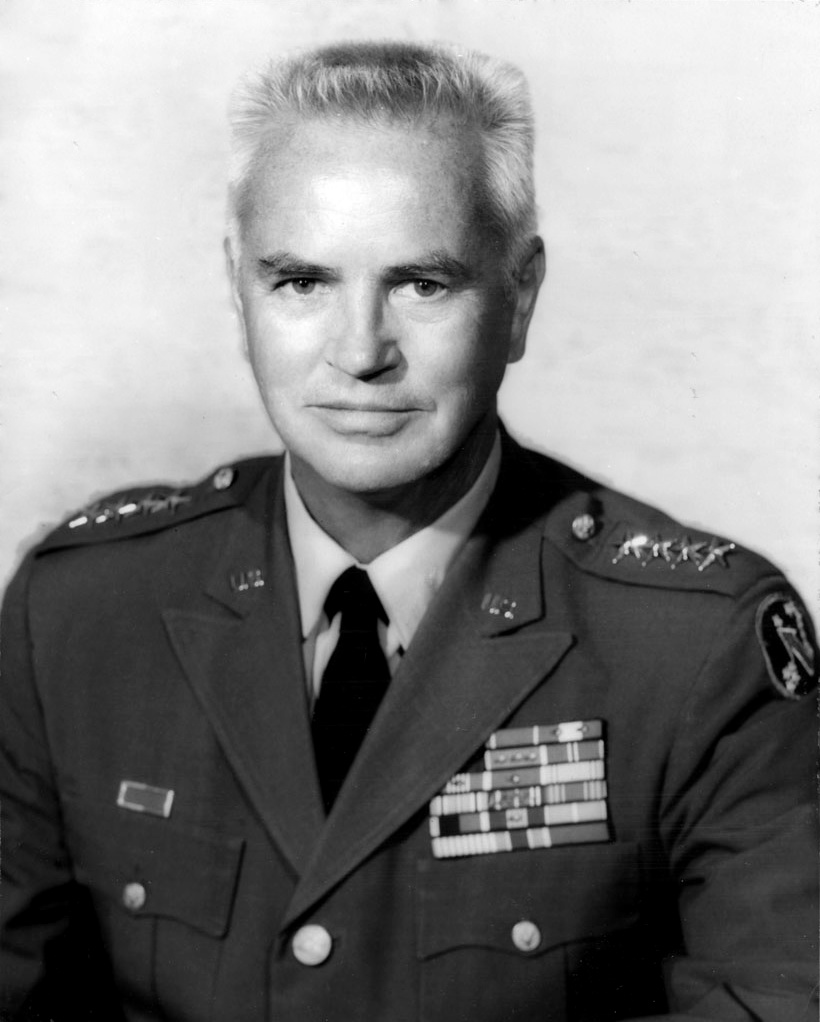
- General Donald V. Bennett
- Born: 9 May 1915; Lakeside, Ohio, US
- Died: 28 November 2005 (aged 90); Asheville, North Carolina, US
- Military career
- Allegiance: United States
- Branch: United States Army
- Service years: 1940–1974
- Rank: General
- Commands: U.S. Army Pacific Command; U.S. Forces Korea; Defense Intelligence Agency; United States Military Academy; 62nd Armored Field Artillery Battalion
- Conflicts: World War II
- Awards: Distinguished Service Cross; Army Distinguished Service Medal; Legion of Merit; Bronze Star; Purple Heart (2)

Donald Vivian Bennett (9 May 1915 – 28 November 2005) retired as a four-star general from the United States Army in 1974. He attended Michigan State University for two years, but then left to attend, and graduate from, the United States Military Academy in 1940. Bennett then served overseas in World War II in North Africa, Sicily, and in the invasion of the European continent. Bennett received the Distinguished Service Cross as well as two Purple Hearts for his service. He was born in Lakeside, Ohio and retired to Asheville, North Carolina. He entered military service from Ohio.

== Career ==
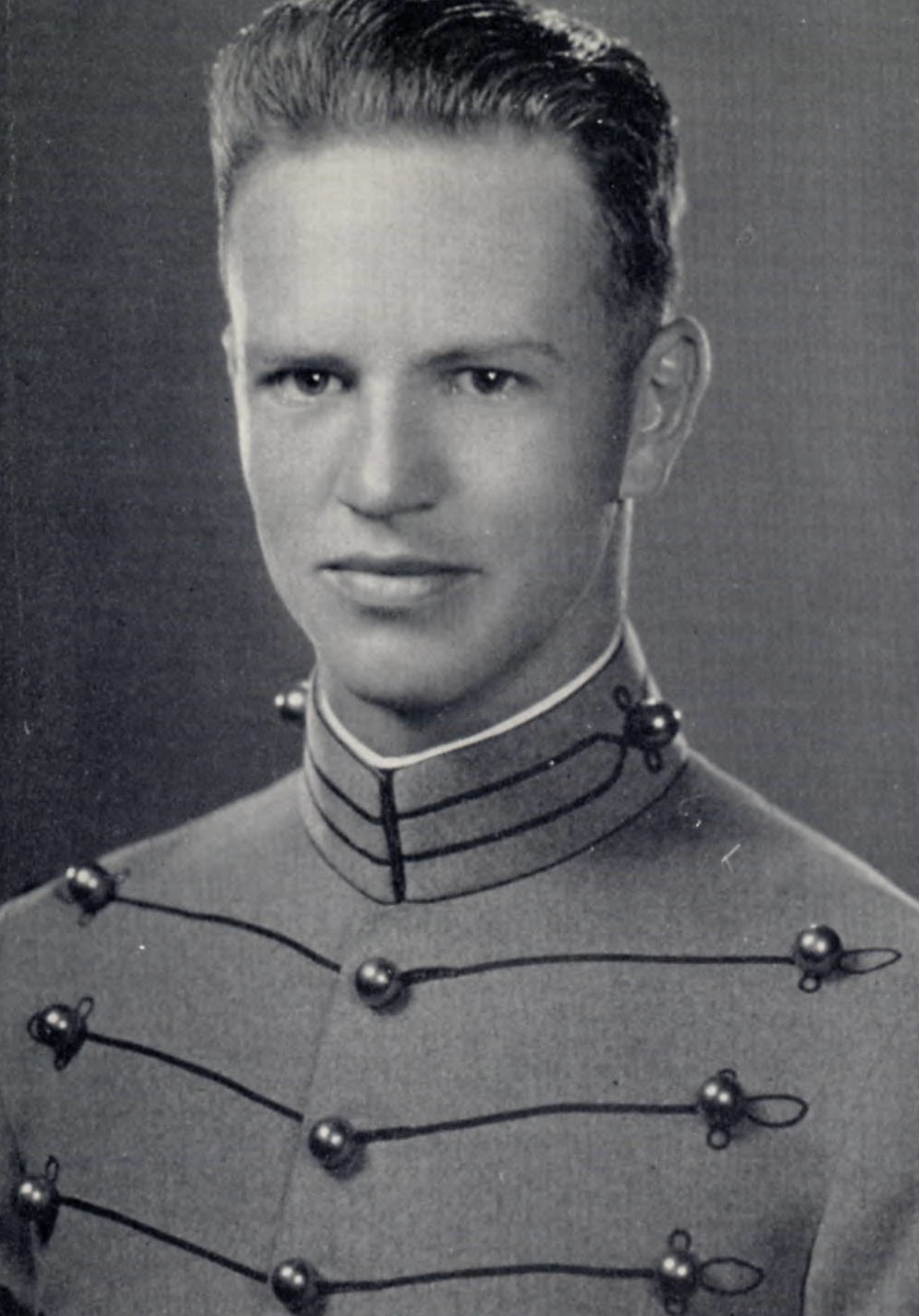
Bennett as a West Point cadet in 1940

On 6 June 1944, Lieutenant Colonel Bennett, along with the 62nd Armored Field Artillery Battalion which he commanded, landed with the second wave at 0720 on D-Day. His party was subjected to a tremendous volume of machine gun fire which inflicted 50 percent casualties before they reached the comparative safety of the shingle at the base of the cliff adjoining the beach. Observing that following units were pinned down on the beach, he immediately left his cover and moved about the beach under heavy fire in order to assemble and reorganize the infantry assault companies, four tanks, and an antiaircraft unit.

By redistributing the remaining officers and equipment; by emplacing the .50 caliber machine guns of the antiaircraft unit so as to give close support to the infantry; and by radioing for tank and artillery fire support from the LCTs, he organized a sizable force and, at about 1000 hours, successfully assaulted the ridge. He then continued moving about the beach under intense fire and succeeded in locating a protected place to bring his battalion and move it across the beach. Lieutenant Colonel Bennett, in disregarding his own safety under such heavy enemy fire throughout the day and in his clear thinking, contributed immeasurably to the establishment of the beachhead.

General Bennett recounts his World War II experience in his memoir, Honor Untarnished, published by Tom Doherty Associates, LLC in 2003. He graduated from the Command and General Staff College in 1951 and the Army War College in 1955. General Bennett also served as superintendent of the United States Military Academy from 1966 to 1969. He was Commander of VII US Corps from June 1968 until September 1969, Director of the Defense Intelligence Agency from September 1969 until August 1972 and Commander of U.S. Forces Korea from September 1972 until July 1973. He retired in 1974 as commanding general of the U.S. Army Pacific Command.

Bennett died on November 28, 2005, at the age of 90 and was buried at the United States Military Academy Cemetery in West Point, New York.

Gen. Bennett was inducted into the inaugural class of the Phi Kappa Tau Hall of Fame at the fraternity's centennial convention in 2006.

== See also ==
Military offices
Preceded by James Benjamin Lampert	Superintendents of the United States Military Academy; 1966–1969	Succeeded by Samuel William Koster
Government offices
Preceded by Joseph Carroll	Director of the Defense Intelligence Agency; 1969–1972	Succeeded by Vincent P. De Poix
