= Mühlhäuser =

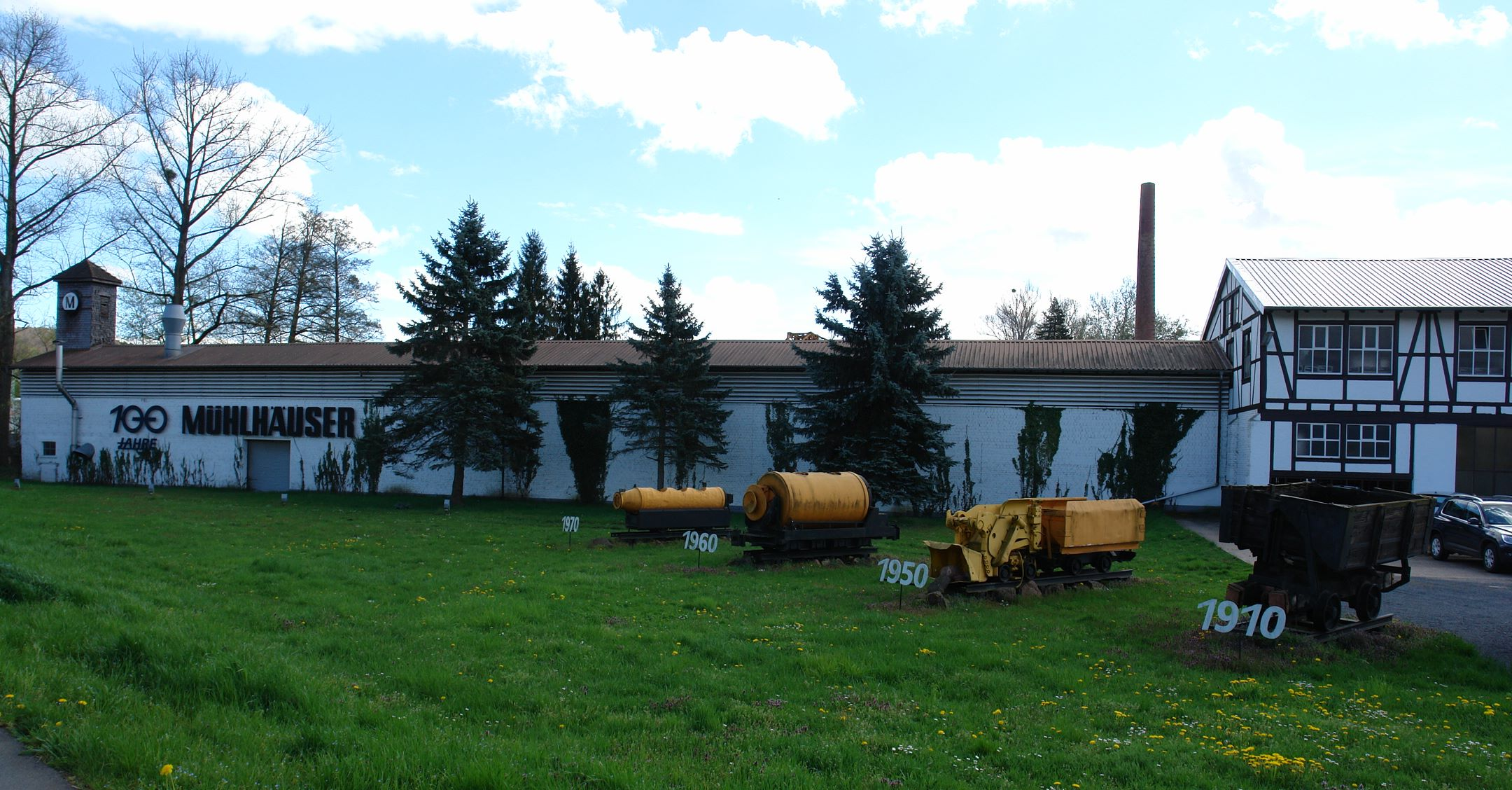
- 100 years of Mühlhäuser in Michelstadt
- Native name: _{Karl-H. Mühlhäuser GmbH & Co. KG, Mühlhäuser - Obermann GmbH, Mühlhäuser Holding GmbH and Mühlhäuser GmbH}
- Type: GmbH & Co. KG
- Industry: Railbound and trackless tunnel construction equipment
- Founded: 1907
- Headquarters: In den Dorfwiesen 23, Michelstadt, Germany
- Key people: Markus Rechner (CEO), Rainer Oestreicher (CFO) and Paul Zeder (Sales & Distribution)
- Website: http://khmtunnel.com/

Mühlhäuser was a manufacturer of railbound and trackless tunnel construction equipment, such as narrow gauge rolling stock, rails, and switches; conveyor belts, concrete, and grouting and formwork equipment; and off-road service vehicles on rubber wheels. Due to mismanagement, the company was declared bankrupt in 2019, And It was acquired by Mining Equipment Ltd. in 2020.

== History ==
Mühlhäuser was founded in 1907 by three Mühlhäuser brothers. In 2013, fourth-generation family member Hubertus Mühlhäuser took over the majority of the shares from his father, uncle and cousin, and later retired as managing director, in 2015. The company was later sold to Mining Equipment Ltd., in 2020.

Mühlhäuser provided equipment for the construction of the Elbe Tunnel, the New York City Subway, the Channel Tunnel and the Gotthard Base Tunnel. After the completion of the Channel Tunnel, Mühlhäuser bought back some of the used equipment and rented it out or sold it refurbished for other tunnel construction projects. For the Gotthard Base Tunnel they built bespoke ambulance trains, fire service trains and a big vacuum cleaner to remove any dust particles from the tunnel.
