= Charles W. Davis (politician) =

19th century American politician

Member of the Wisconsin Senate from the 19th district
- In office January 7, 1895 – January 2, 1899
- Preceded by: George White Pratt
- Succeeded by: Henry I. Weed

12th Mayor of Oshkosh, Wisconsin
- In office April 1868 – April 1869
- Preceded by: Joseph H. Porter
- Succeeded by: Joseph H. Porter

Personal details
- Born: January 5, 1827 Castleton, Vermont, U.S.
- Died: June 8, 1912 (aged 85) Oshkosh, Wisconsin, U.S.
- Resting place: Riverside Cemetery, Oshkosh
- Party: Republican
- Spouse: Christie A. McMillen (m. 1850; died 1883)
- Children: Julia (Jones)^{(b. 1851; died 1871)}; Sarah (Weed)^{(b. 1852; died 1931)}; Helen Davis^{(b. 1873; died 1920)}

Charles Wesley Davis (January 5, 1827 – June 8, 1912) was an American businessman, banker, and Republican politician from Oshkosh, Wisconsin. He was the 12th mayor of Oshkosh and served four years in the Wisconsin Senate, representing the 19th Senate district from 1895 to 1899.

== Career ==
Charles W. Davis was born in Castleton, Vermont, in 1827.

Davis was elected to the Senate in 1894. Additionally, he was Mayor of Oshkosh and Chairman of the Winnebago County, Wisconsin Board. He was a Republican. He served as president of the New German American bank in Oshkosh from 1892 to January 11, 1907, when he resigned, stating that man eighty years of age out to resign.

Davis died in his home in Oshkosh from heart disease at the age of 85.

== See also ==
- List of mayors of Oshkosh, Wisconsin

Wisconsin Senate
Preceded by George White Pratt	Member of the Wisconsin Senate from the 19th district January 7, 1895 – January 2, 1899	Succeeded by Henry I. Weed
Political offices
Preceded by Joseph H. Porter	Mayor of Oshkosh, Wisconsin; April 1868 – April 1869	Succeeded by Joseph H. Porter
