= West Salem High School (Salem, Oregon) =

School in Polk County, Oregon, U.S.

Location
- 1776 Titan Drive Northwest; Salem, Polk County, Oregon 97304; United States; 44.9594035°N 123.0846027°W

Information
- Type: Public
- Motto: It's a great day to be a Titan!
- Opened: 2002
- School district: Salem-Keizer School District
- Principal: Carlos Ruiz
- Teaching staff: 70.25 (on an FTE basis)
- Grades: 9-12
- Enrollment: 1,666 (2023-2024)
- Student to teacher ratio: 23.72
- Colors: Forest Green, Black, and Silver
- Athletics conference: OSAA 6A-6 Central Valley Conference
- Mascot: Titan
- Team name: Titans
- Rival: Sprague High School
- Feeder schools: Straub Middle School, Walker Middle School
- Website: West Salem Home Page

West Salem High School (WSHS) is a public high school of the Salem-Keizer School District located in Salem, Oregon, United States.

== Academics ==
In 2008, 82% of the school's seniors received a high school diploma. Of 339 students, 279 graduated, 29 dropped out, five received a modified diploma, and 26 were still in high school the following year.

In 2017, 1,732 students were enrolled at West Salem High School. At that time, its graduation rate was 89%.

The 2017 class of 414 had 37 dropouts, and 87% of the class graduated on time.

The size of the class of 2024 was the same as the class of 2017, with 414 students, with 93% of students graduating on time.

== Athletics ==
West Salem High School athletic teams compete in the OSAA 6A-6 Central Valley Conference (excluding Football, which competes in 6A-SD1). The athletic director is Wendy Stradley and the athletics secretary is Amy Hamilton.

=== State championships ===
State championships include:

- Band: 2010, 2011, 2012, 2013, 2014, 2015, 2016, 2018, 2019, 2022, 2023, 2024, 2025 (tie
- Boys Cross Country: 2026
- Boys Track and Field: 2018
- Cheerleading: 2024
- Choir: 2013, 2014, 2015, 2017, 2018, 2022, 2023, 2024, 2025
- Full Orchestra: 2013, 2016, 2017, 2018, 2019, 2022, 2023, 2026
- String Orchestra: 2011†, 2013, 2016, 2017, 2023

(†=Tied with 1 or more schools)

=== West Salem Football Stadium ===
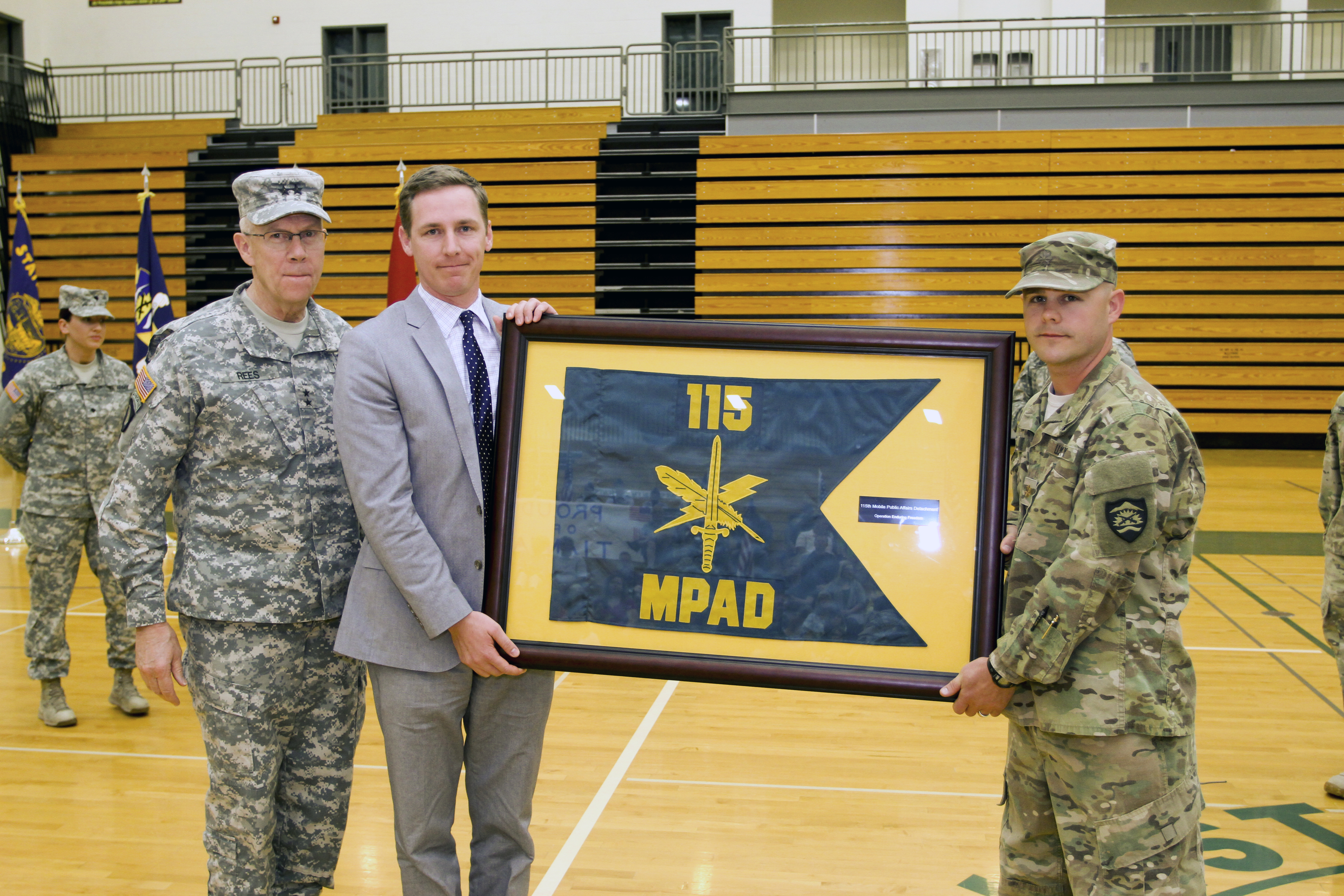
Oregon state and military officials participate in a demobilization ceremony for the 115th Mobile Public Affairs Detachment at West Salem High School, May 5, marking the unit’s return from Afghanistan.

In 2012, West Salem unveiled a new artificial turf field. Unlike other schools, which have green turf or green grass, West Salem's football field was black and nicknamed "The Black Hole." The black turf was one of a kind, and West Salem was the first school in the country to play on Black Turf. The turf cost $300,000. However, in 2020, West Salem raised $470,000 to remove the black turf and replace it with green turf.

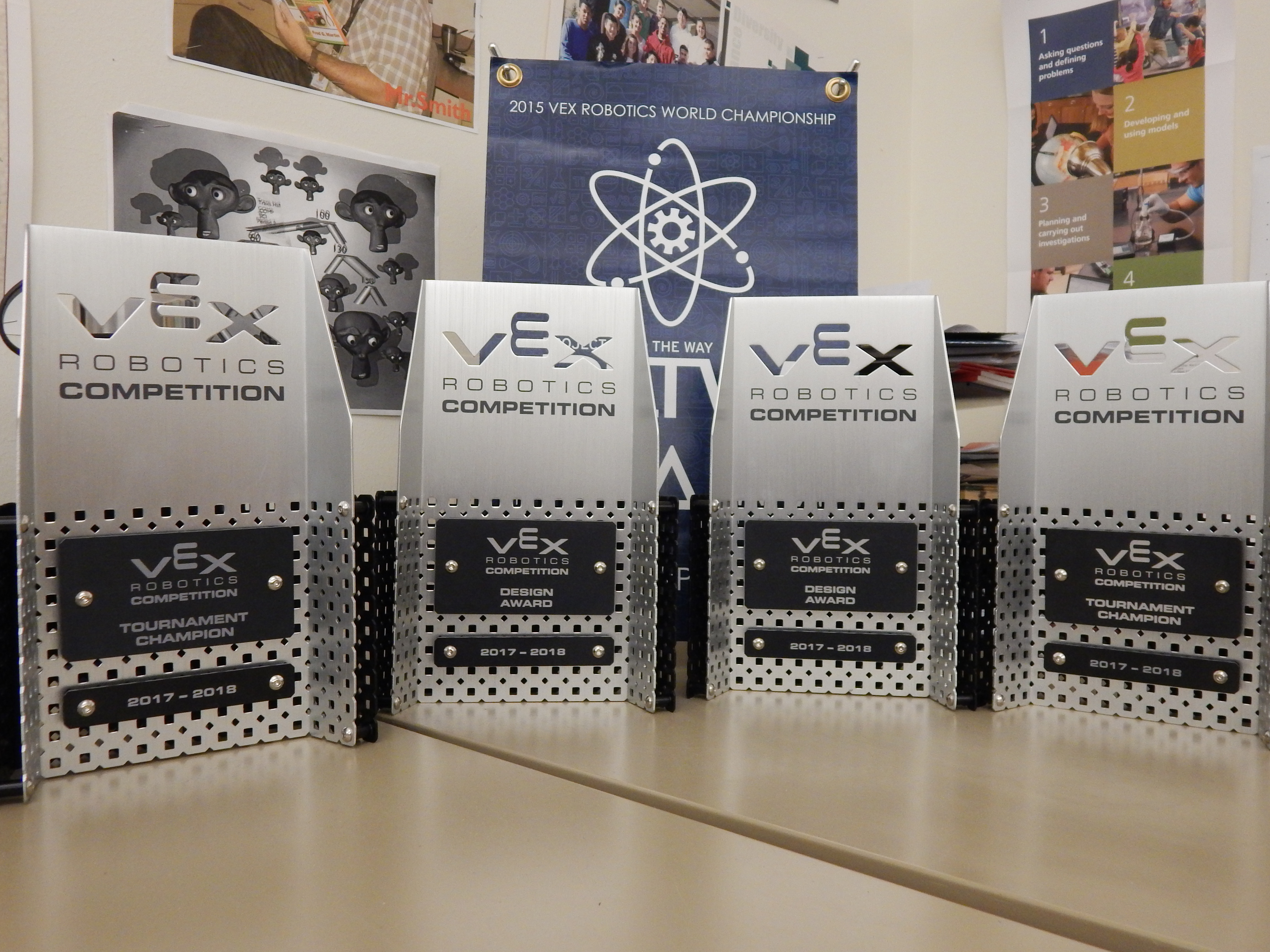
Awards from the VEX Robotics world championships

== Notable students ==
- Ryan Allen - American football player
- Brett Smith - American football player
- Anthony Gould - American football player

== See also ==
- Michael Stephen Lampert (former teacher)
- Micah Masei (alumnus)
