= James Benjamin Lampert =

United States Army general

James B. Lampert
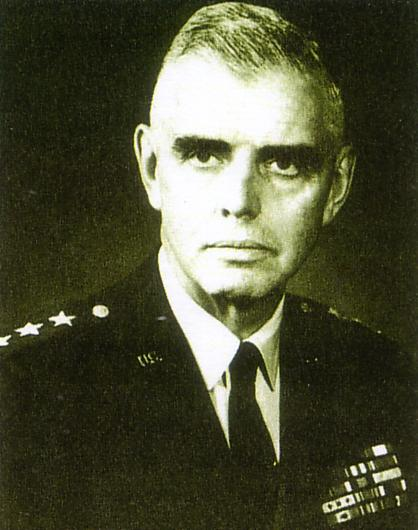
- James Benjamin Lampert

High Commissioner of the United States Civil Administration of the Ryukyu Islands
- In office 28 January 1968 – 14 May 1972
- Preceded by: Ferdinand Thomas Unger
- Succeeded by: Office abolished

Superintendent of the United States Military Academy
- In office 1963–1966
- Preceded by: William Westmoreland
- Succeeded by: Donald V. Bennett

Personal details
- Born: April 16, 1914 Washington, D.C., U.S.
- Died: July 10, 1978 (aged 64) Washington, D.C., U.S.
- Relatives: Florian Lampert (grandfather)
- Awards: Distinguished Service Medal (3); Silver Star; Legion of Merit; Bronze Star Medal

Military service
- Allegiance: United States
- Branch/service: United States Army
- Years of service: 1936–1972
- Rank: Lieutenant General
- Unit: U.S. Army Corps of Engineers
- Commands: Superintendent of the United States Military Academy
- Battles/wars: World War II; Vietnam War

James Benjamin Lampert (April 16, 1914 – July 10, 1978) was a United States Army Lieutenant General, Superintendent of the United States Military Academy (1963–1966), and early pioneer of nuclear weapons and nuclear power. Lampert was General Leslie Groves' executive officer as part of the Manhattan Project after World War II. Lampert was a grandson of Wisconsin U.S. representative Florian Lampert.

== Early life and education ==
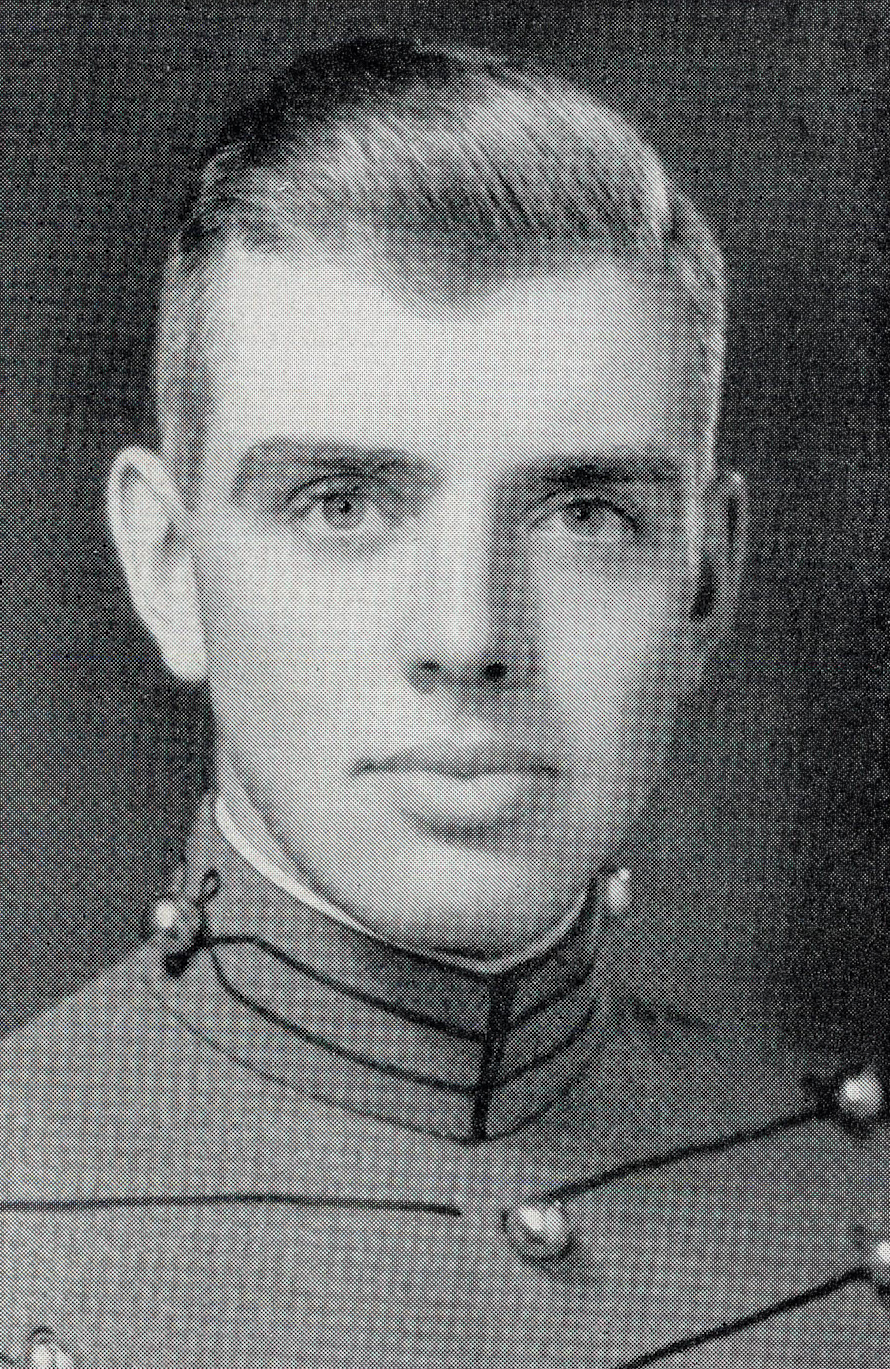
Lampert as a West Point cadet c. 1936

Born in Washington, D.C., on April 16, 1914, Lampert was the son of Lt. Col. James G. B. Lampert, USMA 1910, who died in January 1919 while serving with the American Expeditionary Forces in Europe. He spent his childhood in Wisconsin, where his mother moved after his father died. He received an appointment to West Point as a member of the class of 1936. Upon graduating 36th in his class of 276, he was commissioned as a Second Lieutenant in the Field Artillery branch, but within a year transferred to the Engineer branch. He studied civil engineering at MIT, earning his MS in 1939. His thesis was entitled A Study of Methods of Determining Flood Damages and of Evaluating Flood Control Benefits and his advisor was Harold K. Barrows.

== Early military career ==
With the onset of World War II, Lampert was assigned to the South Pacific where he commanded an engineer aviation battalion in the Fiji Islands and Solomon Islands. In January 1944 he became the XIV Corps chief engineer, where he participated in the invasion of Luzon, Philippines, and the subsequent liberation of Manila in March 1945. During the war, Lampert was awarded the Silver Star, Legion of Merit, and Bronze Star. Following the war, Lampert joined the Air Force's Special Weapons Project and became the executive officer to Lieutenant General Leslie R. Groves, who was chief of the Manhattan Project (1947–1949).

== Senior military career ==
Lampert was the chief district engineer in the Charleston, South Carolina, and Tulsa, Oklahoma, districts from 1949 to 1952. He returned to the field of nuclear energy in 1952, he became the Officer-in-Charge of the joint Nuclear Power Program. In 1957, Lampert attended the National War College. He then was assigned to Saigon, Vietnam, where he became Deputy Chief for Logistics for the Military Assistance Advisory Group-Vietnam (later MACV). After his tour in Vietnam, Lampert was assigned to the Pentagon as the director of military construction at the Office of the Chief of Engineers, a post he held until assuming command at West Point in as the 46th Superintendent (1963–1966). After leaving the academy, Lampert was Deputy Assistant Secretary of Defense for Manpower (1966–1968). In 1969 he became the commanding general and high commissioner of the Ryukyu Islands until his retirement in 1972.

== Post military ==
Lampert became vice president for Resource Development at MIT in 1972. He was a member of the Board of Directors of West Point's Association of Graduates (AOG) and became AOG's president in 1978. Lampert contracted cancer and died at Walter Reed Army Medical Center in Washington, D.C., in 1978.

== Personal ==
Lampert married Margery Frances "Gerri" Mitchell on June 26, 1937, at the Military Academy Cadet Chapel. Her father was Brig. Gen. William A. Mitchell. Their first child Margery Katharine died four months after birth. They later had two sons and another daughter. Lampert is buried with his wife and infant daughter at the West Point Cemetery.

== Bibliography ==
- Tucker, Todd (2009). Atomic America: How a deadly explosion and a feared admiral changed the course of nuclear history. Simon & Schuster. p. 93–94. ISBN 978-1-4165-4433-3.

Military offices
Preceded by William Westmoreland	Superintendents of the United States Military Academy; 1963–1966	Succeeded by Donald V. Bennett
