= George H. Buckstaff =

19th century American politician

Member of the Wisconsin Senate from the 19th district
- In office January 3, 1887 – January 5, 1891
- Preceded by: Thomas Wall
- Succeeded by: George White Pratt

Member of the Wisconsin State Assembly from the Winnebago 3rd district
- In office January 3, 1881 – January 1, 1883
- Preceded by: Hiram W. Webster
- Succeeded by: Carlton Foster

Personal details
- Born: March 8, 1837 Dumbarton Parish, New Brunswick
- Died: October 17, 1913 (aged 76) Oshkosh, Wisconsin, U.S.
- Resting place: Riverside Cemetery, Oshkosh, Wisconsin
- Party: Republican
- Spouse: Martha A. Murray (m. 1868–1913)
- Children: George E. Buckstaff, 2 others
- Relatives: George A. Buckstaff (nephew)
- Occupation: lumberman, politician

Military service
- Allegiance: United States
- Branch/service: United States Volunteers; Union Army
- Years of service: 1861–1864
- Rank: Sergeant, USV
- Unit: 1st Reg. Wis. Vol. Infantry
- Battles/wars: American Civil War

George Hardin Buckstaff (March 8, 1837 – October 17, 1913) was a British North America-born American lumberman, and Republican politician. He served four years in the Wisconsin State Senate and two years in the State Assembly, representing Winnebago County. During the American Civil War, he served in the Union Army and was wounded at the Battle of Chickamauga.

== Biography ==
Buckstaff was born on March 8, 1837, in Dumbarton Parish, New Brunswick. He came to Wisconsin in 1850 to work as a lumberman in Winnebago County.

After the outbreak of the American Civil War, he volunteered for service in the Union Army and was enrolled in Company A of the 1st Wisconsin Infantry Regiment. He served through the first three years of the war, participating in the battles at Perryville, Stones River, and Hoover's Gap. He was wounded at the Battle of Chickamauga, in September 1863, and mustered out of federal service at the end of his three year enlistment in October 1864.

He was a member of the Winnebago County Board of Supervisors in 1878 and 1879. He was elected to the Wisconsin State Assembly in 1880 and re-elected in 1881. He did not run for another term in 1882. In 1886, he ran for office again and was elected to the Wisconsin State Senate from the 19th State Senate district.

He died at his home in Oshkosh in 1913.

== Personal life and family ==
George H. Buckstaff was a son of John Buckstaff, Sr. His father and several brothers also moved to the Oshkosh area and were successful in the lumbering business. His nephew, George A. Buckstaff, also served in the Wisconsin State Assembly.

On October 21, 1868, Buckstaff married Martha Murray. They had three children.
