= John S. Durland =

American politician

John S. Durland was an American politician. He was a member of the Wisconsin State Assembly.

== Biography ==
Durland was born on December 1, 1847, in Chester, Orange County, New York. He finished his education in Bloomfield, New Jersey, before moving to Rushford, Minnesota, in 1869 and La Crosse, Wisconsin, in 1888.

== Career ==
Durland was a Republican member of the Assembly during the 1905 session. He was also a member of the city councils and boards of education of Rushford and La Crosse.
