= Julius H. Dennhardt =

American politician

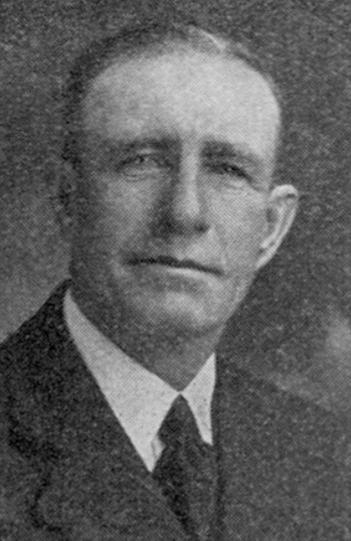

Mayor of Neenah, Wisconsin
- In office 1922–1923, 1926–1927

Member of the Wisconsin State Assembly
- In office 1911

Member of the Wisconsin State Senate
- In office 1918–1922

Personal details
- Born: February 5, 1869 Naumburg, Saxony, German Empire
- Died: March 19, 1929 (aged 60) Neenah, Wisconsin, US
- Party: Republican
- Occupation: Auctioneer, businessman, politician

Julius H. Dennhardt (February 5, 1869 – March 19, 1929) was an American auctioneer, businessman, and politician.

== Biography ==
Born in Naumburg, Saxony in what is now Germany, Dennhardt emigrated to the United States and settled in Wisconsin as a young man. He was in the implement business and was an auctioneer. Dennhardt served in the Wisconsin State Assembly in 1911 and was a Republican. He then served in the Wisconsin State Senate in 1919. Dennhardt served as mayor of Neenah, Wisconsin from 1922 to 1923, and from 1926 to 1927.

Dennhardt died of a stroke in Neenah, Wisconsin.
