= Michael Stephen Lampert =

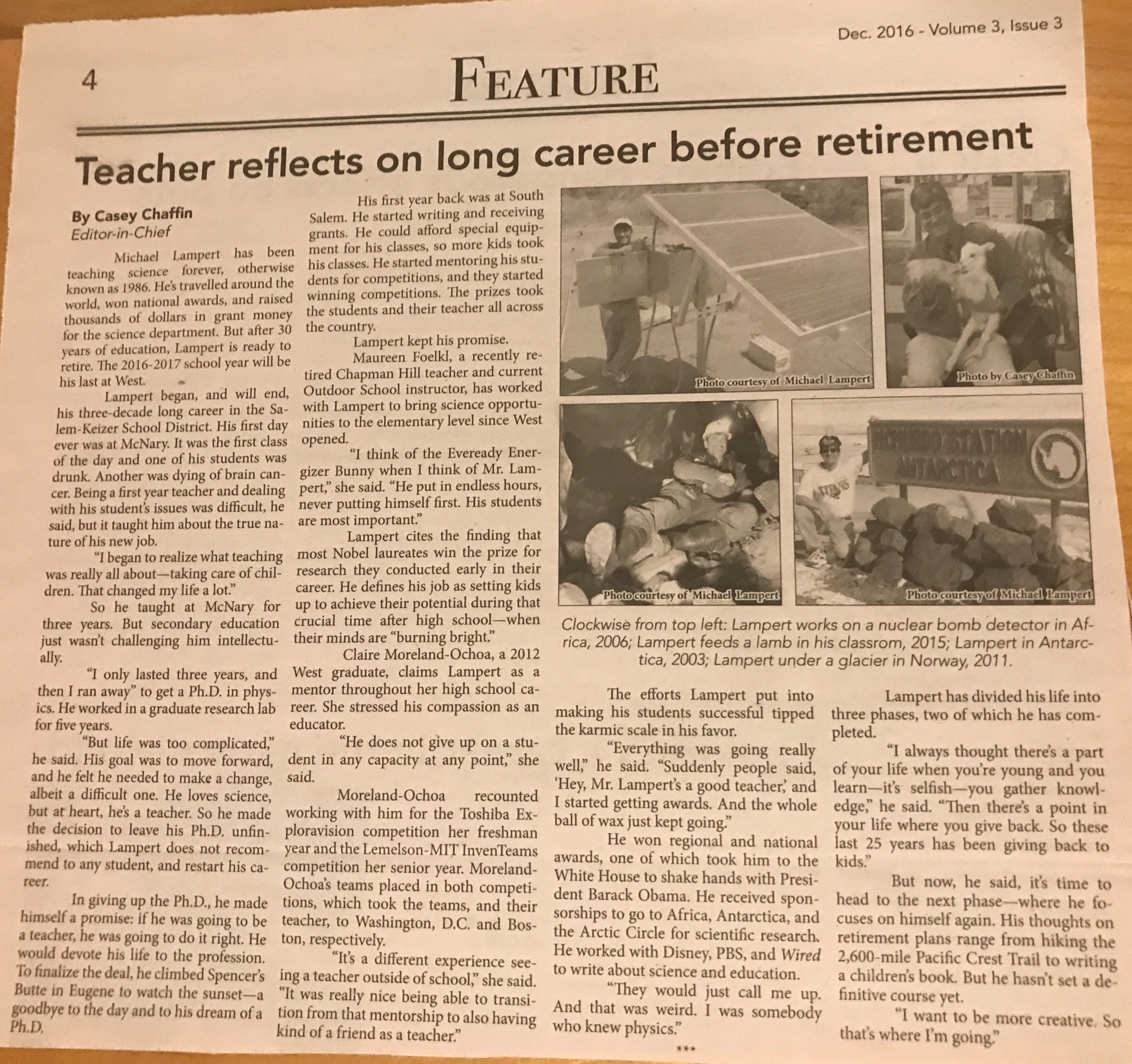

Michael Stephen Lampert was an American high school science teacher at West Salem High School in Salem, Oregon. Lampert graduated from UC Berkeley with a degree in Physics and pursued a PhD in Atomic Physics at Oregon State University before becoming a high school teacher. He has written numerous grants to fund innovative projects such as Airbag Physics, Sports Physics, and elementary school outreaches.

Lampert was one of 45 winners of the 2005 Disney Teacher Award. He was Oregon Teacher of the Year for 2008–2009, and the winner of the 2009 American Association for the Advancement of Science Leadership in Science Education Prize for High School Teachers. In 2010, he was one of ten winners of the PBS Teachers Innovation Awards, and the Society for Science and the Public listed him as one of ten SSP Fellows.
