= F. Badger Ives =

American politician

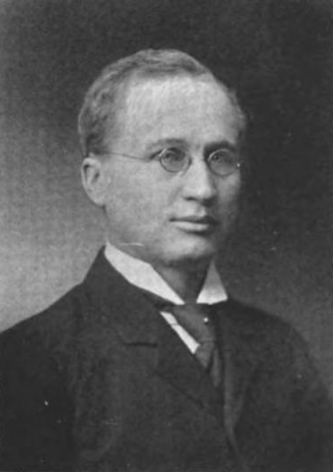

Member of the Wisconsin State Assembly
- In office 1899

Personal details
- Born: November 21, 1858 New London, Wisconsin
- Died: January 21, 1914 (aged 55) Oshkosh, Wisconsin
- Party: Republican
- Education: University of Chicago Law School
- Occupation: Businessman, politician

F. Badger Ives (November 21, 1858 – January 21, 1914) was an American businessman and politician.

== Biography ==
Born in New London, Wisconsin, Ives moved to Oshkosh, Wisconsin in 1871. He went to Oshkosh Business College and Oshkosh Normal School (now University of Wisconsin–Oshkosh). He was in the grocery and fruit business. Between 1890 and 1894, Ives lived in Chicago, Illinois and worked in the fruit business. He also went to the University of Chicago Law School. In 1894, Ives returned to Oshkosh and started his own business. Ives served on the Oshkosh Common Council and was a Republican. In 1899, Ives served in the Wisconsin State Assembly. He died in Oshkosh in 1914.
