= John A. Fridd =

American politician

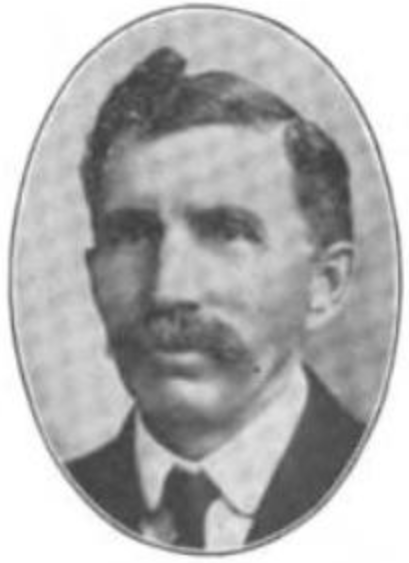

Member of the Wisconsin State Senate
- In office 1906–1910
- Constituency: District 19

Member of the Wisconsin State Assembly
- In office 1902–1906

Personal details
- Born: October 23, 1850 Winnebago County, Wisconsin
- Died: September 24, 1934 (aged 83) Fullerton, California
- Party: Republican
- Spouse: Addie Fridd (m. 1872)
- Education: Ripon College
- Occupation: Farmer, businessman, politician

John A. Fridd (October 23, 1850 – September 24, 1934) was a member of the Wisconsin State Assembly and Wisconsin State Senate.

== Biography ==
Fridd was born on October 23, 1850, in Winnebago County, Wisconsin. He attended Ripon College.

He married Addie Fridd in 1872.

== Career ==
Fridd was elected to the Assembly in 1902 and 1904. Other positions he held include town chairman, similar to mayor. He was a Republican. Fridd served in the Wisconsin State Senate from 1907 to 1911.

Fridd moved to California, where he died on September 24, 1934, in Fullerton.
