= William C. Cowling =

American politician

William C. Cowling was an American politician. He was a member of the Wisconsin State Assembly.

== Biography ==
Cowling was born on July 2, 1872, in Oshkosh, Wisconsin. For a time, he served as editor of the Oshkosh Northwestern.

== Political career ==
Cowling was elected to the Assembly in 1902. He was a Republican.
