= Frank T. Tucker =

American politician

Frank Tyler Tucker (June 11, 1864 – September 1, 1910) was an American politician and lawyer.

Frank Tyler Tucker was born June 11, 1864, in Macon Township, Lenawee County, Michigan. His parents were Dr. E. L. Tucker and Mary Frances Tyler Tucker.

Tucker moved to Omro, Winnebago County, Wisconsin. In 1886, Tucker graduated from the Northern Indiana Normal School and was principal of the schools in Omro and Winneconne, Winnebago County, Wisconsin. Tucker went to the University of Wisconsin Law School and was admitted to the Wisconsin bar. Tucker practiced law in Neillsville, Wisconsin, In 1893 and 1897, Tucker served in the Wisconsin State Assembly from Winnebago County, Wisconsin and was a Republican. Tucker was appointed law examiner in the office of the Wisconsin Attorney General and later was appointed assistant attorney general. Tucker drowned in the Wolf River in Oshkosh, Wisconsin while campaigning in the Republican primary for the office of Wisconsin Attorney General.
