= Hubertus, Prince of Löwenstein-Wertheim-Freudenberg =

German writer, historian and politician (1906–1984)

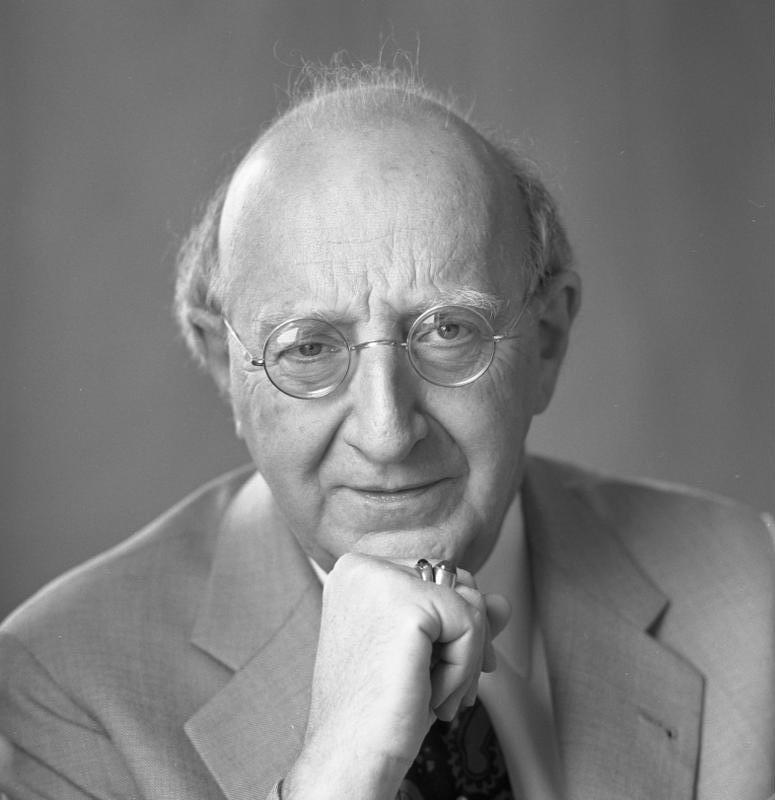
Prince Hubertus in 1971

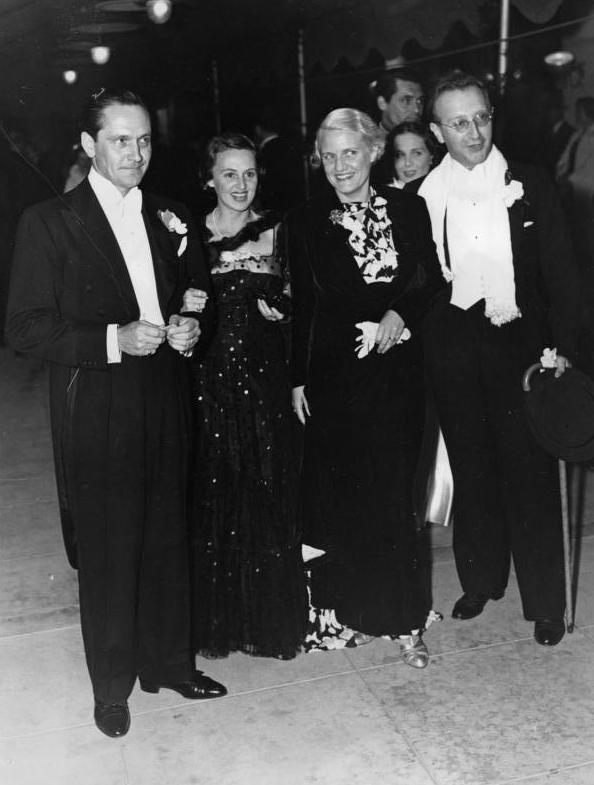
Left to right: Fredric March with his wife Florence Eldridge, Helga Maria zu Löwenstein-Wertheim-Freudenberg (born Schuylenburg) with husband Hubertus, Prince of Löwenstein-Wertheim-Freudenberg at the Premiere of Anthony Adverse on 29. July 1936 in Los Angeles

Prince Hubertus zu Loewenstein-Wertheim-Freudenberg (October 14, 1906 – November 28, 1984) was a German historian and political figure who was an early opponent of Adolf Hitler. He fled Germany and helped to promote anti-Nazism in the United States. He was a former member of Parliament, and was the author of over 40 books. He was the head of the Free German Authors Association, and was decorated by Pope John XXIII for work toward reconciliation between the Roman Catholic and the Greek Orthodox church.

He was the son of Count Maximilian of Löwenstein-Scharfeneck and Constance, daughter of Henry de Worms, 1st Baron Pirbright. Prince Hubertus was instrumental in returning the island of Heligoland to West Germany from Britain which used this high-sea island for bombing training after Britain occupied it after World War II.

== See also ==
- Löwenstein-Wertheim
