= Lambertus de Monte =

Dutch-born German philosopher (died 1499)

Lambertus de Monte, also Lambertus de Monte Domini or Lambert of Cologne (Dutch: Lambertus van 's-Heerenbergh; c. 1430/5–1499), was a medieval scholastic and Thomist.

Originally from 's-Heerenberg (Monte Domini), he went to the University of Cologne in 1450, where he was taught by his uncle Gerhardus de Monte, and received his Master of Arts in 1454, holding an arts professorship there from 1455 until 1473, when he became a doctor of theology. He then taught in the faculty of theology until his death.

He wrote several Thomist commentaries on Aristotle, including the Physics, De anima, and the logica nova, most of which were printed in Cologne during his lifetime or shortly thereafter. He was a defender of the Thomistic interpretation of Aristotle against that of Albert the Great and his followers. He was a member of the Schola Coloniensis of Thomists. Notably, he argued for Aristotle's salvation against the scholarly consensus that Aristotle was in Hell. He also wrote copulata (introductory logical analysis) of Peter of Spain. Besides Thomas and Gerhardus, he was influenced by Henry of Gorkum, Gerhardus' teacher. After Henry and Gerhardus, he was the third doctor of the bursa Montana, a college of students and faculty living in common.

== Works ==
- Copulata totius novae logicae Aristotelis
- Copulata super libros De anima Aristotelis ("Expositio ... circa tres libros De anima Aristotelis"), first published 1485, 1492
- Compilatio commentaria ... in octo libros Aristotelis De physico ("Prohemium Phisicorum"), first published 1493, 1498
- Copulata omnium tractatuum Petri Hispani etiam (syncategorematum et) parvorum logicalium ac trium modernorum secundum doctrinam Thomae Aquinatis cum textu
- De salvatione Arestotelis, first published c. 1498 (modern edition: Peter von Moos and Philipp Roelli (eds). Heiden im Himmel? Geschichte einer Aporie zwischen Mittelalter und früher Neuzeit, mit kritischer Edition der Quaestio de salvatione Aristotelis des Lambertus de Monte, Heidelberg 2014)
