= Gustav S. Luscher =

American politician

Gustav Samuel Luscher (February 12, 1856 – September 15, 1943) was an American businessman and politician.

Born in Oshkosh, Wisconsin, Luscher was an insurance agent. He was also in the real estate business. In 1893 and 1895, Luscher served in the Wisconsin State Assembly and was a Democrat. He died in Oshkosh, Wisconsin.
