= Henry I. Weed =

American politician

Henry Irwin Weed (February 10, 1861 – May 25, 1945) was an American lawyer, military officer, and politician.

Born in Livingston County, New York, his father was killed in the Battle of the Wilderness during the American Civil War. He then moved to Wisconsin in 1865 with his mother and grandparents and settled on a farm in the town of Utica, Winnebago County, Wisconsin. Weed went to the public schools. He then went to Lawrence University in Appleton, Wisconsin and to University of Wisconsin. Weed studied law and was admitted to the Wisconsin bar in 1882. Weed practiced law in Oshkosh, Wisconsin. Weed served as Oshkosh city attorney from 1890 to 1895. In 1896, Weed ran for the office of Wisconsin Attorney General on the Democratic Party ticket and lost the election. Weed served in the Wisconsin State Senate from 1899 to 1903. Weed served on the military staff of Wisconsin Governor George Wilbur Peck and was commissioned a lieutenant colonel. During World War I, Weed served on the judge's advocate staff. In 1908, Weed and several men started the Wisconsin National Life Insurance Company; Weed was involve with the company until his death. Weed died at his home in Oshkosh, Wisconsin.
