= Moscow (community), Wisconsin =

Moscow, Wisconsin
- Unincorporated community
- Location within Wisconsin Location within the United States
- Coordinates: 42°50′00″N 89°51′18″W
- Country: United States
- State: Wisconsin
- County: Iowa
- Town: Moscow
- Elevation: 840 ft (260 m)
- Time zone: UTC-6 (Central (CST))
  - Summer (DST): UTC-5 (CDT)
- Area code: 608
- GNIS feature ID: 1577735

Moscow is an unincorporated community in the town of Moscow, Iowa County, Wisconsin, United States.

== History ==
Moscow was named after the Mascouten (sometimes spelled Muscoutin) Indians who summered here. In 1847 Chauncey Smith built a grist mill on the Blue Mounds Branch of the Pecatonica River that runs through the community. The village was platted and recorded in 1850. A post office, blacksmith, hotel, school, cheese factory, broom factory, carding mill, and doctor all prospered here. At one time the population reached about 110. In 1887 the village was by-passed by the Illinois Central Railroad and declined slowly as people and businesses moved to Blanchardville or Hollandale.

By the 1870s the village had become an epicenter of activity for the surrounding Norwegian settlement. During this time, the Moscow Fremad Laseselsklab (Moscow Reading Society) brought accessible literature and intellectual events to the community. Annual Syttende Mai celebrations featured such well known guests as Rasmus B. Anderson and Ole Bull, the most famous Norwegian of his day.

Bjorn "Ben" Holland, was a businessman in Moscow before founding Hollandale.

Alvin Blanchard brought grain to the mill in Moscow before he founded Blanchardville.

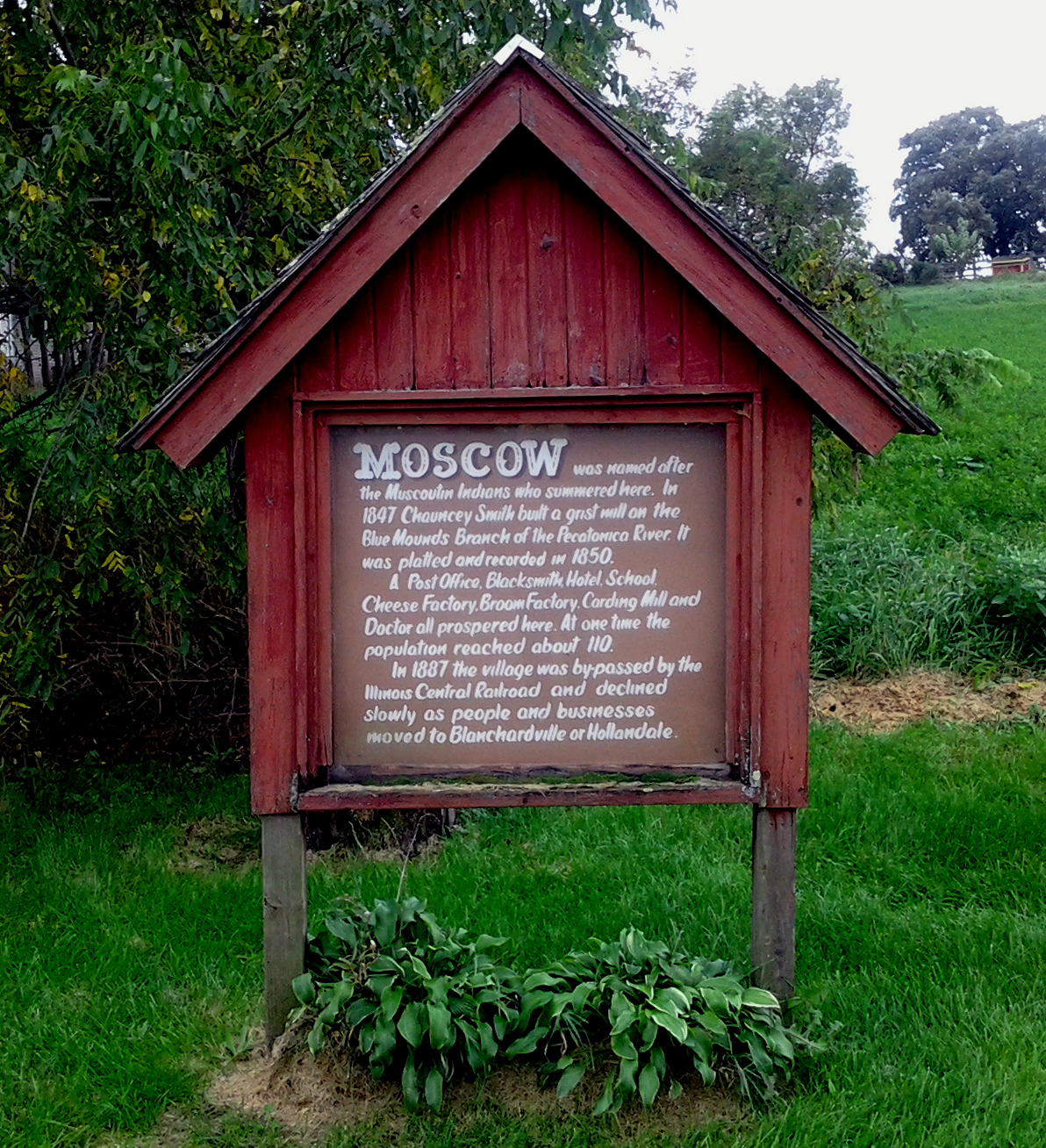
Moscow, WI marker 01

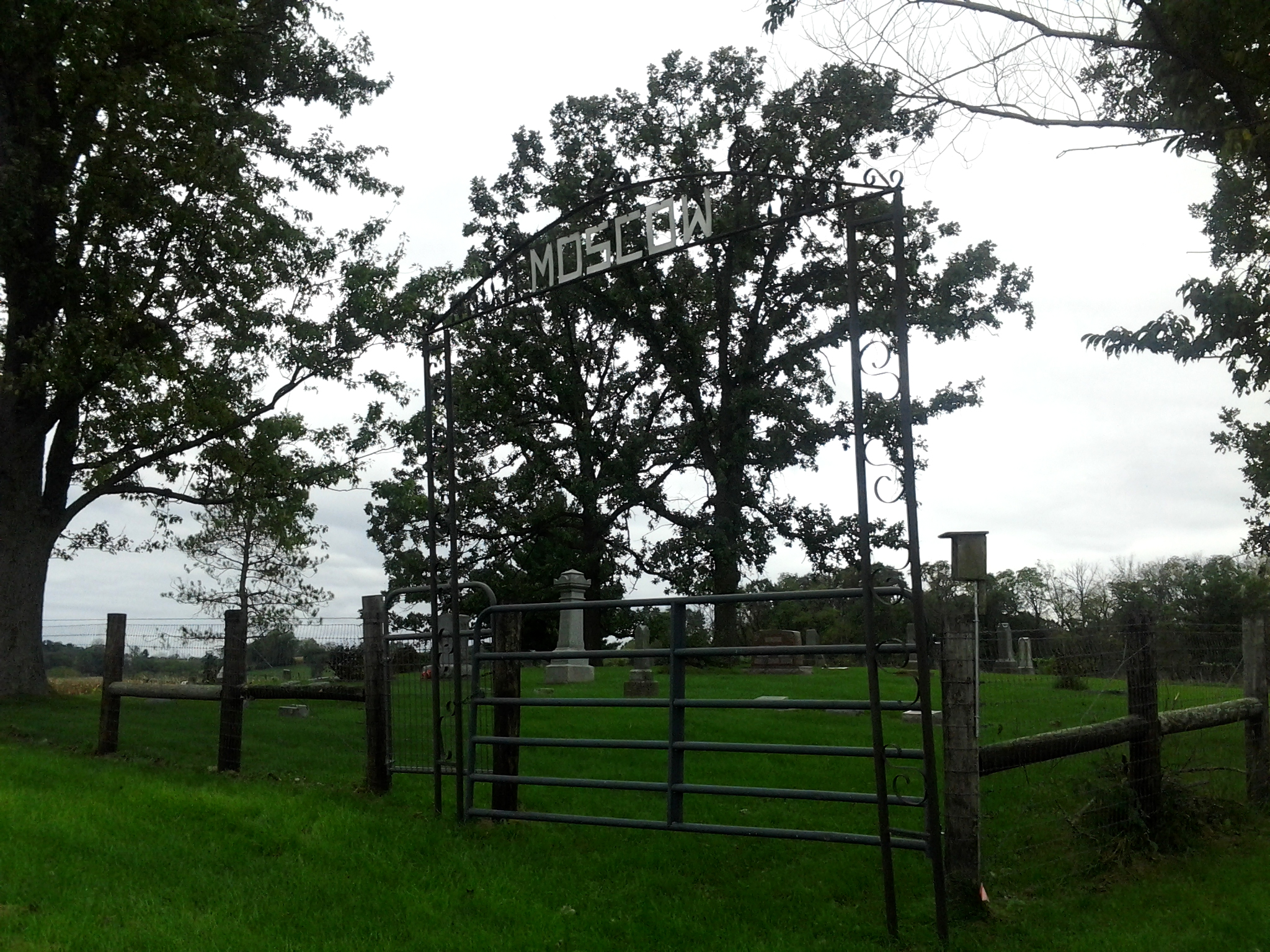
Moscow, WI marker 02
