= Almah Jane Frisby =

American physician (1857–1931)

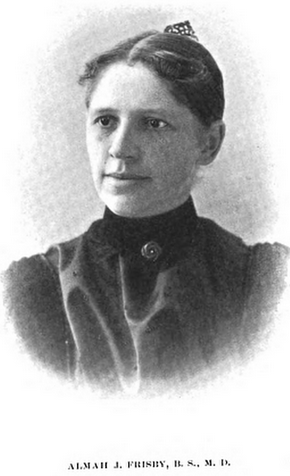
- Almah J. Frisby, from a 1900 publication.
- Born: July 8, 1857; West Bend, Wisconsin, U.S.
- Died: November 12, 1931 (aged 74); Santa Barbara, California, U.S.
- Resting place: Forest Home Cemetery, Milwaukee
- Education: University of Wisconsin; Boston University School of Medicine
- Known for: First woman appointed to the University of Wisconsin Board of Regents
- Father: Leander F. Frisby
- Relatives: Franklin L. Gilson (cousin)

Almah Jane Frisby (July 8, 1857 – November 12, 1931) was an American physician and professor at the University of Wisconsin.

== Early life and education ==
Almah Jane Frisby was born in West Bend, Wisconsin, the daughter of lawyer Leander F. Frisby and Frances E. Rooker Frisby. Judge Franklin L. Gilson was her cousin. She graduated from the University of Wisconsin in 1878; at the university's commencement ceremonies that year, both Almah Frisby and her sister Alice Frisby gave speeches. Almah Frisby trained as a physician at the Boston University School of Medicine, earning her medical degree in 1883.

== Career ==
Frisby had a private medical practice in Milwaukee, Wisconsin. In 1886 and 1887, she was resident physician at the Women's Homeopathic Hospital in Philadelphia, Pennsylvania, and in 1887, she spent a summer as resident physician at a hotel in the Catskills. She presented a paper to the Wisconsin State Homeopathic Medical Association in 1887, titled "Topical vs. Internal Medication in the Treatment of Uterine Disease." She was the first woman appointed to Wisconsin's State Board of Control; she served as a board member from 1905 to 1912, supervising the state's reformatories, prisons, hospitals, and charitable institutions. "She declares the judgment of women is necessary to determine healthful conditions, occupations, proper care, and education of women and girls in state institutions," explained a news report in 1905.

From 1889 to 1895, Frisby was a professor of "hygiene and sanitary science" and principal of Ladies' Hall at the University of Wisconsin, teaching and supervising women students. In 1897, she coauthored a report for the United States Department of Agriculture titled "Losses in Boiling Vegetables and the Composition and Digestibility of Potatoes and Eggs". She was the first woman appointed to the university's Board of Regents, a position she held from 1901 to 1906.

== Personal life ==
Almah Jane Frisby died in 1931, in Santa Barbara, California, aged 74 years. Her papers are archived in the Wisconsin Historical Society. There is a railroad station named for Almah J. Frisby in Marshfield, Wisconsin.
