= Manchester, Jackson County, Wisconsin =

Manchester, Wisconsin
- Town
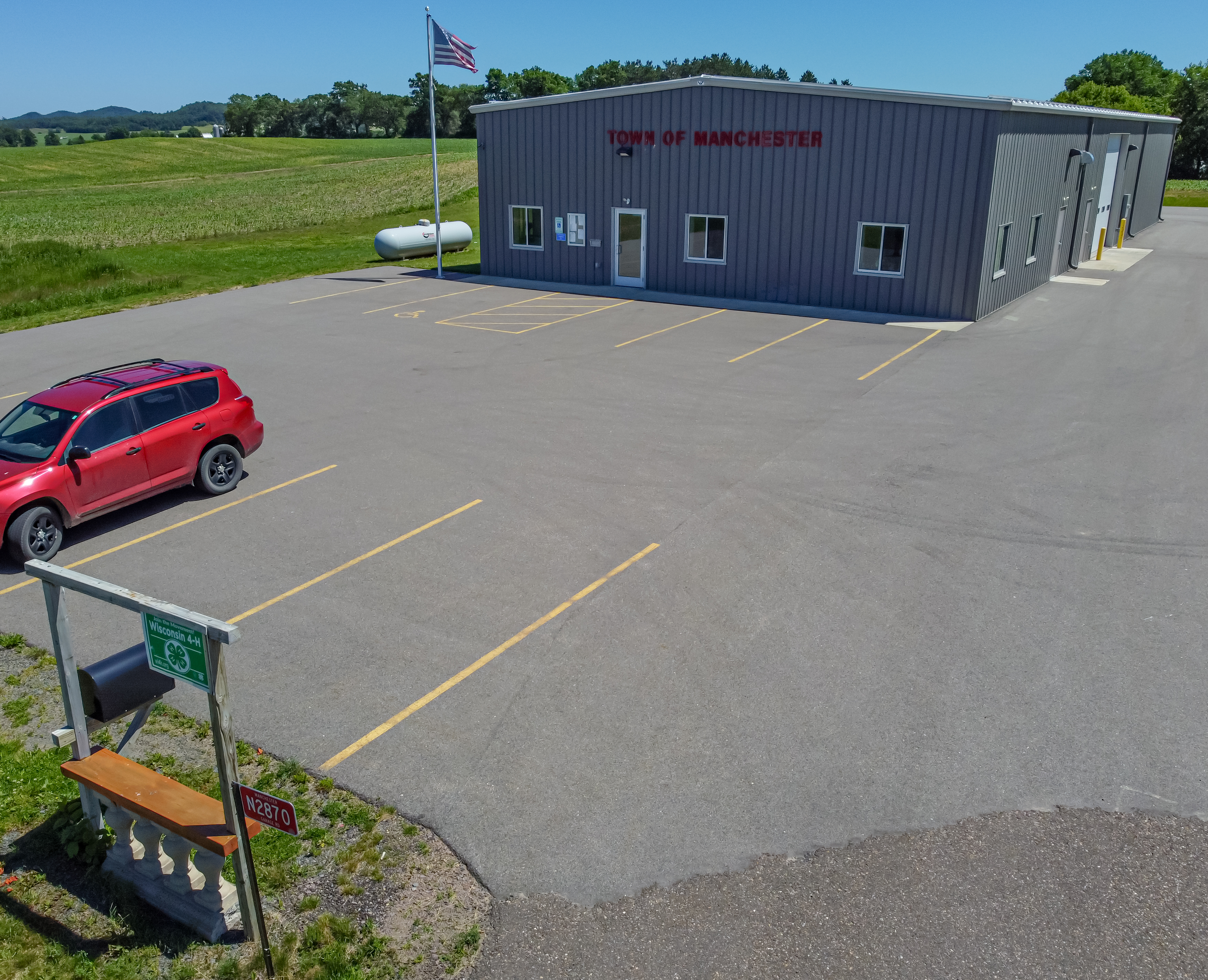
- Manchester Town hall

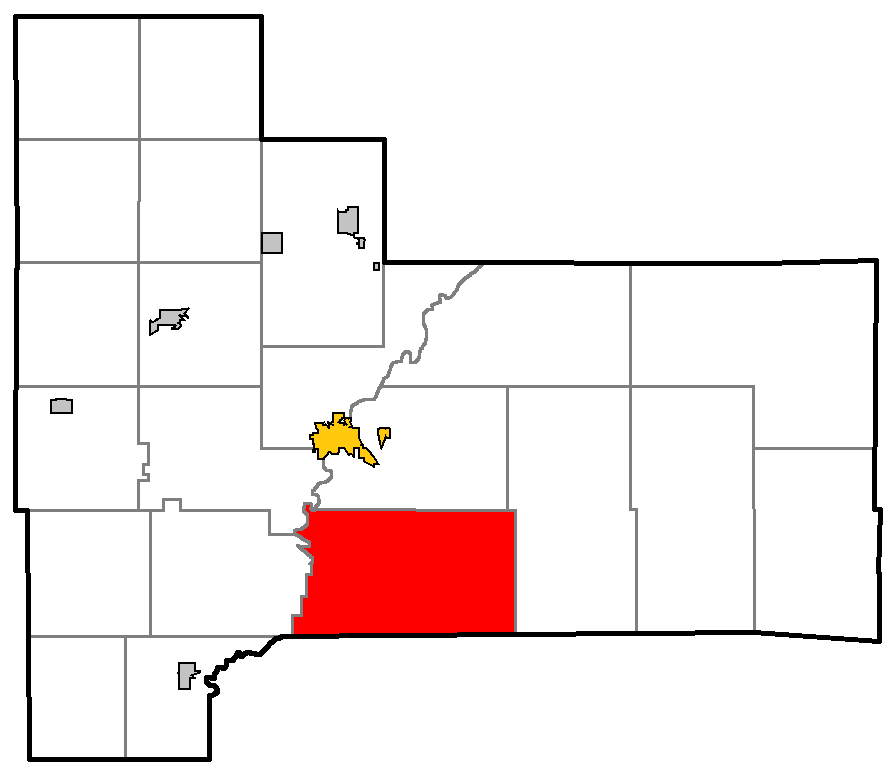
- Location of Manchester, Jackson County

- Location of Jackson County, Wisconsin
- Coordinates: 44°12′14″N 90°46′50″W
- Country: United States
- State: Wisconsin
- County: Jackson

Area
  - Total: 64.4 sq mi (166.9 km^{2})
  - Land: 64.2 sq mi (166.4 km^{2})
  - Water: 0.19 sq mi (0.5 km^{2})
- Elevation: 915 ft (279 m)

Population (2020)
  - Total: 825
  - Density: 12.8/sq mi (4.96/km^{2})
- Time zone: UTC-6 (Central (CST))
  - Summer (DST): UTC-5 (CDT)
- FIPS code: 55-48425
- GNIS feature ID: 1583634
- Website: https://manchesterwi.gov/

Manchester is a town in Jackson County, Wisconsin, United States. The population was 825 at the 2020 census. The unincorporated communities of Fall Hall Glen and Shamrock are located in the town.

== Geography ==
According to the United States Census Bureau, the town has a total area of 64.4 square miles (166.9 km^{2}), of which 64.2 square miles (166.4 km^{2}) is land and 0.2 square mile (0.5 km^{2}) (0.29%) is water.

== Demographics ==
As of the census of 2000, there were 680 people, 265 households, and 196 families residing in the town. The population density was 10.6 people per square mile (4.1/km^{2}). There were 322 housing units at an average density of 5.0 per square mile (1.9/km^{2}). The racial makeup of the town was 93.09% White, 0.15% African American, 5.88% Native American, 0.15% from other races, and 0.74% from two or more races. Hispanic or Latino of any race were 1.03% of the population.

There were 265 households, out of which 27.9% had children under the age of 18 living with them, 65.7% were married couples living together, 6.8% had a female householder with no husband present, and 25.7% were non-families. 19.6% of all households were made up of individuals, and 7.5% had someone living alone who was 65 years of age or older. The average household size was 2.57 and the average family size was 2.94.

In the town, the population was spread out, with 24.1% under the age of 18, 5.4% from 18 to 24, 28.7% from 25 to 44, 30.1% from 45 to 64, and 11.6% who were 65 years of age or older. The median age was 40 years. For every 100 females, there were 103.0 males. For every 100 females age 18 and over, there were 103.1 males.

The median income for a household in the town was $40,625, and the median income for a family was $45,179. Males had a median income of $30,625 versus $21,125 for females. The per capita income for the town was $18,184. About 1.9% of families and 5.0% of the population were below the poverty line, including 1.9% of those under age 18 and 11.8% of those age 65 or over.

== Notable people ==
- Thomas Brooks Mills, Wisconsin legislator and businessman, was born in the town
