= Thomas Brooks Mills =

American politician and businessman (1857–1930)

Thomas B. Mills
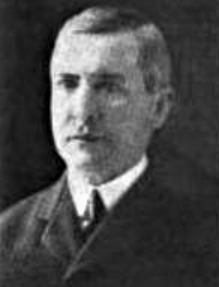

35th Speaker of the Wisconsin State Assembly
- In office January 12, 1887 – January 5, 1891
- Preceded by: Hiram Orlando Fairchild
- Succeeded by: James J. Hogan

Member of the Wisconsin Senate from the 11th district
- In office January 7, 1895 – January 2, 1899
- Preceded by: John T. Kingston
- Succeeded by: Edgar G. Mills

Member of the Wisconsin State Assembly from the Jackson district
- In office January 5, 1885 – January 5, 1891
- Preceded by: Ralza W. Button
- Succeeded by: James J. McGillivray

Personal details
- Born: October 12, 1857 Manchester, Jackson County, Wisconsin, U.S.
- Died: March 19, 1930 (aged 72) Clearwater, Florida, U.S.
- Resting place: Riverside Cemetery, Black River Falls, Wisconsin
- Party: Republican
- Occupation: Businessman, politician

Thomas Brooks Mills (October 12, 1857 – March 19, 1930) was an American politician and businessman. He was the 35th Speaker of the Wisconsin State Assembly, and also served in the Wisconsin State Senate in the 1890s.

== Biography ==
Born in the town of Manchester, Jackson County, Wisconsin, Mills went to the McMynn Academy in Racine, Wisconsin. In 1890, Mills moved to West Superior, Wisconsin and was in the real estate and lumber business.

He served in the Wisconsin State Assembly from 1885 to 1891 and was a Republican. He also served as speaker of the Wisconsin Assembly in 1887 and 1889. From 1895 to 1899, Mills served in the Wisconsin State Senate. While in the Wisconsin Legislature, Mills was able to help locate the Superior Normal School (now University of Wisconsin–Superior) in Superior, Wisconsin.

He served as grand exalted ruler of the Benevolent and Protective Order of Elks.

Mills died suddenly in Clearwater, Florida on March 19, 1930.
