= Hiram Orlando Fairchild =

19th century American lawyer & politician

Hiram O. Fairchild
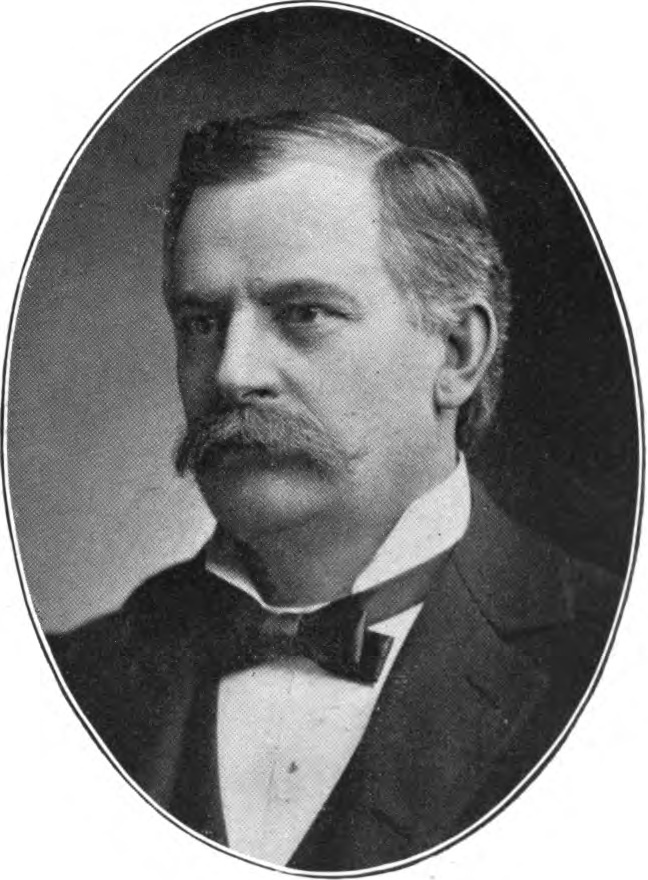
- From Notable Men of Wisconsin (1902)

District Attorney of Marinette County, Wisconsin
- In office January 2, 1893 – January 7, 1895
- Appointed by: William E. Smith
- Preceded by: Charles Edward McIntosh
- Succeeded by: Everett C. Eastman
- In office April 1879 – January 5, 1891
- Preceded by: Position established
- Succeeded by: Charles Edward McIntosh

34th Speaker of the Wisconsin State Assembly
- In office January 14, 1885 – January 3, 1887
- Preceded by: Earl Finch
- Succeeded by: Thomas Brooks Mills

Member of the Wisconsin State Assembly from the Florence–Marinette district
- In office January 1, 1883 – January 3, 1887
- Preceded by: District established
- Succeeded by: James L. Murphy

Personal details
- Born: August 14, 1845 Newtown, Indiana, U.S.
- Died: October 14, 1925 (aged 80) Green Bay, Wisconsin, U.S.
- Resting place: Woodlawn Cemetery, Marinette, Wisconsin
- Party: Republican
- Spouse: Emma Hough (m. 1871; died 1923)
- Children: Charles M. Fairchild^{(died in infancy)}; Caroline Hough (Kimball)^{(b. 1874; died 1960)}; Jean Fay Fairchild^{(b. 1876; died 1880)}; Arthur W. Fairchild^{(b. 1876; died 1956)}; Bertha Wheeler (Basche)^{(b. 1878; died 1920)}; Herbert Bigelow Fairchild^{(b. 1880; died 1962)}
- Relatives: Harlan P. Bird (brother-in-law)
- Education: Wabash College
- Profession: Lawyer

Hiram Orlando Fairchild (August 14, 1845 – October 14, 1925) was an American lawyer and Republican politician. He was the 34th speaker of the Wisconsin State Assembly and served as the first district attorney of Marinette County, Wisconsin. His name was often abbreviated as H. O. Fairchild.

== Biography ==
Hiram O. Fairchild was born in Newtown, Indiana, in August 1845. He was raised and educated there, attending high school in Wabash, Indiana. He went on to attend Wabash College, where he graduated in 1866. On his graduation from college, he moved to Fort Kearny, Nebraska Territory, where he was employed to work on behalf of the business interests of former Wisconsin judge Levi Hubbell.

After a year, he moved to Oconto, Wisconsin, and studied law under his brother, John B. Fairchild. He was admitted to the bar in May 1870 and moved to the city of Marinette, Wisconsin, where his father was living. In 1874, he was joined by his brother and they formed the law firm Fairchild & Fairchild. Their partnership would last until Hiram's departure from Marinette in 1895.

When Marinette County was organized in 1879, Fairchild was appointed the first district attorney for the county. He was subsequently elected to six more terms, serving from 1879 through 1891, and 1893 to 1895. Fairchild was a lifelong Republican, and his stretch as district attorney was only interrupted by the Democratic wave election of 1890.

While serving as district attorney, Fairchild distinguished himself with the prosecution of Charles E. Crockett over the 1879 killing of John Kelley. Crockett was a saloon owner in the area and claimed he shot Kelley in self defense after a dispute over payment. Crockett had many prominent Wisconsin attorneys on his defense team, and, through their considerable efforts, managed to get a change of venue, and, after his conviction, managed to get the verdict stayed by the Wisconsin Supreme Court. Fairchild was the sole prosecutor on the case and handled the oral arguments before the Wisconsin Supreme Court, where he prevailed in the case Crockett v. State, 52 Wis. 211 (1881), upholding his conviction of Crockett on manslaughter charges.

Running on the Republican ticket, he was also elected to two terms in the Wisconsin State Assembly, serving in the 1883 and 1885 sessions of the legislature. In the 1885 session, he was elected speaker of the Assembly by the Republican majority. He was also a delegate to the 1888 Republican National Convention.

In 1895, he moved to Green Bay, Wisconsin, where he formed a new law firm. In his later years, he was known as one of the most prominent and distinguished lawyers in Wisconsin, working as the senior partner of the law firm Fairchild, North, Parker, and Bie.

He argued the case of McDermott v. Wisconsin, 228 U.S. 115, before the U.S. Supreme Court, and succeeded in striking down part of Wisconsin's 1907 Pure Foods law. In the Wisconsin Supreme Court case State v. Redmon, 134 Wis. 89 (1907), he successfully argued for striking down a regulation on railroad car sleeping berths. And in Chicago & Northwestern Railway Co. v. State, 128 Wis. 553 (1906), he succeeded in striking down Wisconsin's attempts to implement an Ad valorem tax on railroad freight.

Fairchild died of heart failure on the morning of October 14, 1925, after a long period of declining health. At the time of his death, he was referred to as the dean of the Brown County Bar.

== Personal life and family ==
Hiram Fairchild was one of seven children born to Reverend John Fairchild and his wife Lorinda (née Bigelow). John Fairchild, was a Presbyterian minister and practiced at Marinette, Wisconsin, from 1863 until his death in 1885. Through his mother's Bigelow lineage, Fairchild was a distant cousin of U.S. President James A. Garfield.

Hiram's older sister, Sarah Jane, was married to Harlan P. Bird, who served eight years in the Wisconsin State Senate.

Hiram Fairchild married Emma Haugh of Crawfordsville, Indiana, on November 21, 1871. They had six children together, though two died in childhood. Another daughter, Bertha Basche, died in 1920, and Mrs. Fairchild died of pneumonia in 1923. Fairchild was survived by two sons and one daughter.

Aside from his legal pursuits, Fairchild was a prolific golfer; at the time of his death, he was known as the dean of the Wisconsin golfing community.

== Electoral history ==
=== Wisconsin Assembly (1882, 1884) ===
Wisconsin Assembly, Florence–Marinette District Election, 1882
Party	Candidate	Votes	%	±%
General Election, November 7, 1882
Republican	Hiram O. Fairchild	1,469	58.43%	
Prohibition	A. C. Merryman	1,045	41.57%	
Plurality		424	16.87%	
Total votes		2,514	100.0%	
Republican win (new seat)				

Wisconsin Assembly, Florence–Marinette District Election, 1884
Party	Candidate	Votes	%	±%
General Election, November 8, 1884
Republican	Hiram O. Fairchild (incumbent)	1,856	60.89%	+2.46%
Democratic	James W. Moore	1,095	35.93%	
Prohibition	James Ellis	97	3.18%	−38.38%
Plurality		761	24.97%	+8.10%
Total votes		3,048	100.0%	+21.24%
Republican hold				

Wisconsin State Assembly
New district established	Member of the Wisconsin State Assembly from the Florence–Marinette district January 1, 1883 – January 3, 1887	Succeeded by James L. Murphy
Preceded by Earl Finch	Speaker of the Wisconsin State Assembly; January 14, 1885 – January 3, 1887	Succeeded by Thomas Brooks Mills
Legal offices
New county established	District Attorney of Marinette County, Wisconsin; April 1879 – January 5, 1891	Succeeded by Charles Edward McIntosh
Preceded by Charles Edward McIntosh	District Attorney of Marinette County, Wisconsin; January 2, 1893 – January 7, 1895	Succeeded by Everett C. Eastman
