= John Montgomery Smith =

American politician (1834–1903)

J. M. Smith

Member of the Wisconsin State Assembly from the Iowa district
- In office January 2, 1893 – January 7, 1895
- Preceded by: Robert M. Crawford (1st dist.); Edmund Baker (2nd dist.)
- Succeeded by: William A. Jones

20th & 23rd Mayor of Mineral Point, Wisconsin
- In office April 1885 – April 1886
- Preceded by: William A. Jones
- Succeeded by: Charles Gillmann
- In office April 1879 – April 1882
- Preceded by: Calvert Spensley
- Succeeded by: Thomas Priestley

District Attorney of Iowa County, Wisconsin
- In office January 1869 – January 1873
- Preceded by: E. P. Weber
- Succeeded by: Richard L. Read

Personal details
- Born: February 26, 1834 Bedford County, Pennsylvania, U.S.
- Died: May 14, 1903 (aged 69) Mineral Point, Wisconsin, U.S.
- Resting place: Graceland Cemetery, Mineral Point
- Party: Democratic
- Parent: William Rudolph Smith (father)
- Profession: lawyer

John Montgomery Smith (February 26, 1834 – May 14, 1903) was an American lawyer, Democratic politician, and Wisconsin pioneer. He was a member of the Wisconsin State Assembly, representing Iowa County in the 1893 session, and served four terms as mayor of Mineral Point, Wisconsin. His father, William Rudolph Smith, was the 5th Attorney General of Wisconsin. In contemporaneous documents, his name was usually abbreviated as J. M. Smith.

== Early life ==
John Montgomery Smith was born in 1834, in Bedford Springs, Pennsylvania, and moved to the Wisconsin Territory with his parents at age 4. They settled in what would become Mineral Point, Wisconsin, where he was raised and educated. In 1852, he went to California but returned in 1855 and studied law. He was admitted to the Wisconsin bar in 1862.

== Political career ==
He became involved with the Democratic Party of Wisconsin and was elected to two terms as district attorney of Iowa County, Wisconsin, in 1868 and 1870. He was the Democratic nominee for Attorney General of Wisconsin in 1879, but fell far short of incumbent Republican Alexander Wilson.

He was subsequently elected to four terms as mayor of Mineral Point, in 1879, 1880, 1881, and 1885. He was delegate to the 1880 Democratic National Convention and 1888 Democratic National Convention. During the first administration of President Grover Cleveland, he negotiated treaties with the Ute Indians and then with the Chippewa Indians.

He was elected to the Wisconsin State Assembly from the Iowa County district in 1892, but did not stand for re-election in 1894. He ran again in 1896, but lost to Republican incumbent William A. Jones.

He died in Mineral Point, Wisconsin, in 1903.

== Electoral history ==
=== Wisconsin Attorney General (1879) ===
Wisconsin Attorney General Election, 1879
Party	Candidate	Votes	%	±%
General Election, November 4, 1879
Republican	Alexander Wilson (incumbent)	100,562	53.43%	+9.17%
Democratic	J. Montgomery Smith	74,821	39.75%	−1.64%
Greenback	Edward Q. Nye	12,846	6.82%	−7.54%
Plurality		25,741	13.68%	+10.81%
Total votes		188,229	100.0%	+7.75%
Republican hold				

=== Wisconsin Assembly (1892) ===
Wisconsin Assembly, Iowa District Election, 1892
Party	Candidate	Votes	%	±%
General Election, November 8, 1892
Democratic	John Montgomery Smith	2,358	47.45%	
Republican	Thomas F. Cody	2,264	45.56%	
Prohibition	A. S. Rowe	347	6.98%	
Plurality		94	1.89%	
Total votes		4,969	100.0%	
Democratic win (new seat)				

=== Wisconsin Assembly (1896) ===
Wisconsin Assembly, Iowa District Election, 1896
Party	Candidate	Votes	%	±%
General Election, November 3, 1896
Republican	William A. Jones (incumbent)	3,263	61.21%	+6.50%
Democratic	John Montgomery Smith	2,067	38.77%	+1.55%
Independent	N. H. Snow (write-in)	1	0.02%	
Plurality		1,196	22.43%	+4.95%
Total votes		5,331	100.0%	+3.09%
Republican hold				

Party political offices
Preceded by Joseph McKeen Morrow	Democratic nominee for Attorney General of Wisconsin; 1879	Succeeded by Melancthon J. Briggs
Wisconsin State Assembly
Preceded by Robert M. Crawford (1st dist.); Edmund Baker (2nd dist.)	Member of the Wisconsin State Assembly from the Iowa district January 2, 1893 – January 7, 1895	Succeeded by William A. Jones
Political offices
Preceded by Calvert Spensley	Mayor of Mineral Point, Wisconsin; April 1879 – April 1882	Succeeded by Thomas Priestley
Preceded by William A. Jones	Mayor of Mineral Point, Wisconsin; April 1885 – April 1886	Succeeded by Charles Gillmann
Legal offices
Preceded by E. P. Weber	District Attorney of Iowa County, Wisconsin; January 1869 – January 1873	Succeeded by Richard L. Read
