= Francis E. Leupp =

American politician and writer (1849–1918)

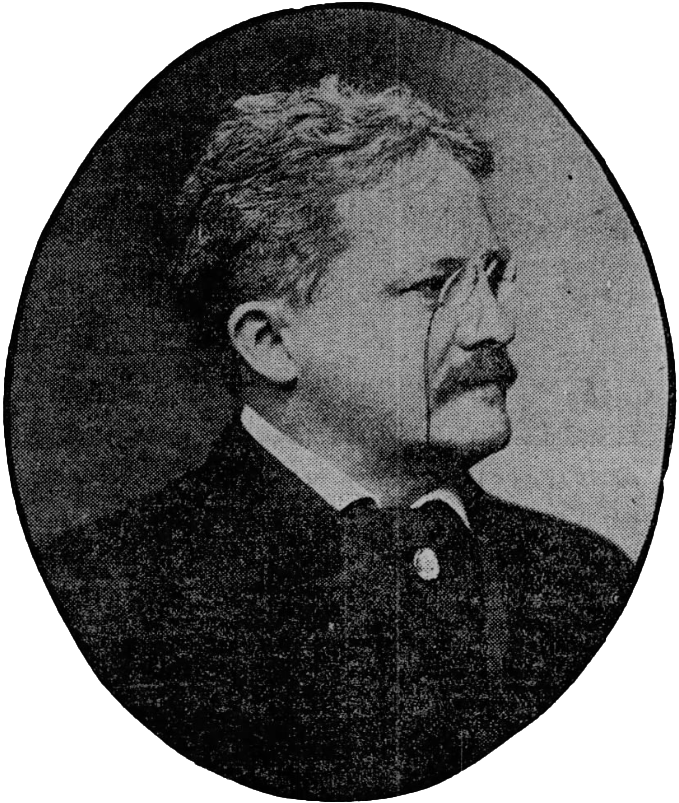
- Leupp in 1906 newspaper

28th Commissioner of Indian Affairs
- In office January 1, 1905 – 1909
- President: Theodore Roosevelt; William H. Taft
- Preceded by: William A. Jones
- Succeeded by: Robert G. Valentine

Personal details
- Born: Francis Ellington Leupp; January 2, 1849 New York, U.S.
- Died: November 19, 1918 (aged 69) Washington, D.C., U.S.
- Spouse: Ada Lewis Murdock
- Children: 4
- Education: Williams College (LLD); Columbia University (LLB)
- Occupation: Politician; writer; newspaper editor

Francis Ellington Leupp (January 2, 1849 – November 19, 1918) was an American politician, writer and newspaper editor. He served as Commissioner of Indian Affairs from 1905 to 1909.

== Early life ==
Francis Ellington Leupp was born on January 2, 1849, in New York. He graduated from Williams College with three degrees, including Doctor of Laws in 1910. Leupp graduated from the Columbia University in 1872 with a Bachelor of Laws.

== Career ==
=== Newspaper career ===
Leupp worked as assistant editor of the New York Evening Post. In 1878, Leupp bought an interest in The Syracuse Herald and served as its editor. In 1885, Leupp contributed articles to the New York Evening Post from Washington, D.C. He served as the Washington correspondent of the paper from 1889 to 1904. He stayed in that role for fifteen years. During that period, he also served as editor of Good Government, publication of the National Civil Service Reform League.

=== Writing career ===
Leupp was known as a biographical writer. He wrote under the pen name "Tatler" in a number of magazines. His works included:

- The Man Roosevelt: A Portrait Sketch (1904)
- The Indian and His Problem (1910)
- In Red Man's Land: A Story of the American Indian (1914)
- A Day With Father (1914)
- Walks About Washington (1915)
- George Westinghouse: His Life and Achievements (1918)
- A Biography of William Howard Taft
- The Presidents of the United States

=== Bureau of Indian Affairs ===
In 1886, Leupp traveled to the Pacific coast and visited a number of Indian reservations. In 1889, he made a similar trip.

In 1895, Leupp traveled to the Southern Ute Indian Reservation as a confidential agent of the U.S. Secretary of the Interior. He became a member of the commissioners of the Bureau of Indian Affairs in 1895. In 1896, Leupp toured Indian reservations in the Dakotas, Iowa, Kansas, eastern Colorado and the Indian territory. In 1897, he traveled again to Arizona and New Mexico. He was appointed by Theodore Roosevelt as successor of William A. Jones as commissioner of that body. He served in that role from January 1, 1905, to 1909.

== Personal life ==
Leupp married Ada Lewis Murdock of New York. They had four children, Harold, Ethel, Mrs. Laurence Todd and Mrs. Reginald Johnson. He was a member of the Gridiron Club and Cosmos Club.

Leupp lived at 1813 16th Street in Washington, D.C., for a time and had a summer home in Tyringham, Massachusetts. Leupp died on November 19, 1918, at his home on Stoneleigh Court in Washington, D.C.
