= Charles Edward McIntosh =

American politician (1836–1915)

Charles E. McIntosh

District Attorney of Marinette County, Wisconsin
- In office January 5, 1891 – January 2, 1893
- Preceded by: Hiram Orlando Fairchild
- Succeeded by: Hiram Orlando Fairchild

District Attorney of Florence County, Wisconsin
- In office April 1882 – June 1884
- Preceded by: Position established
- Succeeded by: William H. Clark Jr.

Member of the Wisconsin State Assembly from the Outagamie district
- In office January 4, 1869 – January 1, 1872
- Preceded by: Thomas R. Hudd
- Succeeded by: District abolished

Personal details
- Born: April 13, 1836 Goderich, Huron County, Upper Canada
- Died: July 25, 1915 (aged 79) King, Waupaca County, Wisconsin, U.S.
- Resting place: Central Wisconsin Veterans Memorial Cemetery, King, Waupaca County, Wisconsin
- Party: Democratic
- Spouses: Mary E. Conklin (m. 1864; div. 1888); Maria D. Durgan (Sweet) (m. 1888; div. 1894)
- Children: with Mary Conklin; Malcolm E. McIntosh; Montgomery E. McIntosh; Maggie E. McIntosh; Nathan McIntosh; Charlotte McIntosh; Donald McIntosh
- Education: University of Notre Dame
- Profession: Lawyer

Military service
- Allegiance: United States
- Branch/service: United States Volunteers; Union Army; United States Army
- Years of service: 1861–1864 (USV); 1865–1866 (USA)
- Rank: Corporal, USV; Sergeant, USA
- Unit: 7th Btry. Wis. Lt. Artillery; 2nd Reg. U.S. Infantry
- Battles/wars: American Civil War: Battle of Brice's Cross Roads; Second Battle of Memphis

Charles Edward McIntosh (April 13, 1836 – July 25, 1915) was a Canadian American immigrant, lawyer, Democratic politician, and Wisconsin pioneer. He was a member of the Wisconsin State Assembly, representing Outagamie County in the 1869, 1870, and 1871 sessions. He also later served as district attorney of Florence County and later Marinette County, Wisconsin. While serving as district attorney in Florence County in 1884, McIntosh was involved in a widely-reported dispute with the sheriff, James E. Readmon, in which they exchanged gunfire, nearly resulting in Readmon's death.

In historical documents, his name was often abbreviated as C. E. McIntosh.

== Early life ==
Charles E. McIntosh was born in Huron County, Ontario, in April 1836. As a child, he emigrated to the Wisconsin Territory with his family. They first settled at Milwaukee, then moved to New Berlin, in Waukesha County. In 1844, they moved to Ashippun, in Dodge County, where McIntosh received most of his education.

At age 19, in 1855, he moved to Oshkosh, Wisconsin, for work, before going the following year to Indiana to attend school at the University of Notre Dame. He returned to Dodge County, Wisconsin, in 1859 and taught school. He was elected superintendent of schools for Dodge County in 1861, but resigned to enter the Union Army after the outbreak of the American Civil War.

== Civil War service ==
He quickly volunteered for service in the Union Army and was enrolled as a private in the 7th Independent Battery Wisconsin Light Artillery. The 7th Battery was recruited in Milwaukee and mustered into service in Racine, Wisconsin, in October 1861. They were active in the western theater of the war. McIntosh rose to the rank of corporal, and during 1864, he was detailed as staff for the court martial at Memphis, Tennessee, until the end of his three-year enlistment.

He subsequently re-enlisted and served as a sergeant in the 2nd U.S. Infantry Regiment in the Army of the Shenandoah near the end of the war, and was camped at Winchester, Virginia, at the time of Lee's surrender. He returned with his regiment to Washington, D.C., and was present at the execution of Mary Surratt and other conspirators in the assassination of Abraham Lincoln. He was then assigned to Elmira, New York, as ordnance sergeant and mustered out of service on February 3, 1866.

== Political career ==
On his return to Wisconsin, he moved north to Appleton, Wisconsin. He became affiliated with the Democratic Party of Wisconsin, and was the Democratic nominee for Wisconsin State Assembly in Outagamie County in 1868. He won that election and was re-elected in 1869 and 1870.

During the 1871 session, redistricting was carried out and Outagamie County was divided between two districts under the new map. McIntosh ran for a fourth term in the new district, which comprised roughly the southern half of Outagamie County, but was defeated in the general election by Republican William H. H. Wroe.

Around the time of the Fall 1871 election, McIntosh attacked county judge Samuel Ryan Jr., who was participating in the vote count. It is not known what led to the sudden attack on Ryan, who was also a Democrat. A crowd quickly separated the two men and McIntosh was arrested.

== Legal career ==
After leaving office, McIntosh pursued a legal career and was admitted to the bar in 1874. He partnered for several years with William Kennedy, who was later district attorney. He moved further north in Outagamie County in the latter part of the decade and became one of the first city officers of Seymour, Wisconsin, after it was incorporated in 1879. He remained there until 1881, when he moved north to Florence County, Wisconsin, which was just in the process of being organized as a new county. He was elected the first district attorney of the county, and was then elected to a full two-year term in that office at the first general election in the Fall of 1882.

While serving as district attorney, McIntosh was involved in another public disturbance when, in June 1884, he and the county sheriff James E. Readmon, exchanged pistol fire in the streets. The sheriff was grievously wounded, while McIntosh escaped unharmed and was arrested. McIntosh was said to have fired the first shot, angry with the sheriff over accusations that he had accepted bribes and consorted with criminals. The sheriff lingered near death for several days, but ultimately survived. The duel became a scandal around the state, with papers from Appleton to Milwaukee denouncing both men. McIntosh soon resigned his office, facing prosecution. The case against him, however, was eventually abandoned.

McIntosh subsequently moved Iron Mountain, Michigan, then to Marinette, Wisconsin, where he continued to work as a lawyer in partnership with J. A. Parkhurst. McIntosh ran for district attorney again in Marinette County. He was defeated in 1888, but ran again in 1890 and won a two-year term.

He continued to practice law in Marinette County through the 1890s and, in 1904, he returned to Appleton. His later years were spent at the Wisconsin Veterans Home in King, Waupaca County, Wisconsin. He died there in 1915 and was buried at the Central Wisconsin Veterans Memorial Cemetery.

== Personal life and family ==
Charles McIntosh married Mary E. Conklin in 1864. They went on to have six children.

McIntosh petitioned for divorce from Conklin in 1888 in order to marry the widow Mrs. Maria D. Sweet (née Durgan). Conklin was awarded custody of the children and fifty dollars per month from him.

In addition to his infamy for his feuds with other elected officials, McIntosh received public scorn for horse-whipping his married adult step-daughter, Mrs. Irma Gault, in 1894. McIntosh and his second wife divorced later that year.

== Electoral history ==
=== Wisconsin Assembly (1869, 1870, 1871) ===
Wisconsin Assembly, Outagamie District Election, 1869
Party	Candidate	Votes	%	±%
General Election, November 2, 1869
Democratic	Charles E. McIntosh	1,513	64.16%	
Republican	H. G. Curtis	845	35.84%	
Plurality		668	28.33%	
Total votes		2,358	100.0%	
Democratic hold				

Wisconsin Assembly, Outagamie District Election, 1870
Party	Candidate	Votes	%	±%
General Election, November 8, 1870
Democratic	Charles E. McIntosh (incumbent)	1,387	50.34%	−13.82%
Republican	George H. Myers	1,368	49.66%	
Plurality		19	0.69%	-27.64%
Total votes		2,755	100.0%	+16.84%
Democratic hold				

Wisconsin Assembly, Outagamie 1st District Election, 1871
Party	Candidate	Votes	%	±%
General Election, November 7, 1871
Republican	William H. H. Wroe	1,174	56.36%	
Democratic	Charles E. McIntosh (incumbent)	909	43.64%	−6.71%
Plurality		265	12.72%	+12.03%
Total votes		2,083	100.0%	-24.39%
Republican gain from Democratic				

Wisconsin State Assembly
Preceded by Thomas R. Hudd	Member of the Wisconsin State Assembly from the Outagamie district January 4, 1869 – January 1, 1872	District abolished
Legal offices
New county government	District Attorney of Florence County, Wisconsin; April 1882 – June 1884	Succeeded by William H. Clark Jr.
Preceded by Hiram Orlando Fairchild	District Attorney of Marinette County, Wisconsin; January 5, 1891 – January 2, 1893	Succeeded by Hiram Orlando Fairchild
