= Earl Finch =

19th century American politician

33rd Speaker of the Wisconsin State Assembly
- In office January 10, 1883 – January 5, 1885
- Preceded by: Franklin L. Gilson
- Succeeded by: Hiram Orlando Fairchild

Member of the Wisconsin State Assembly from the Winnebago 1st district
- In office January 1, 1883 – January 5, 1885
- Preceded by: Andrew Haben
- Succeeded by: Andrew Haben

Personal details
- Born: October 27, 1830 Jay, New York, U.S.
- Died: June 11, 1888 (aged 57) Oshkosh, Wisconsin, U.S.
- Cause of death: Stroke
- Resting place: Riverside Cemetery, Oshkosh
- Party: Democratic
- Spouse: Anna E. Finch (died 1930)
- Children: Frederick Finch^{(died 1874)}; Herbert Guy Finch^{(b. 1863; died 1874)}; Earl P. Finch^{(b. 1865; died 1938)}
- Education: Union College
- Profession: lawyer

Earl Pierce Finch (October 27, 1830 – June 11, 1888) was an American lawyer, Democratic politician, and Wisconsin pioneer. He was the 33rd speaker of the Wisconsin State Assembly, and represented the city of Oshkosh.

== Biography ==
Born in the town of Jay, Essex County, New York, Finch graduated from Union College in 1856. He moved to Menasha, Wisconsin in 1856 and then settled in Oshkosh, Wisconsin. He practiced law and was involved with the Democratic Party. In 1883, Finch served in the Wisconsin State Assembly and was speaker of the Assembly. Finch died from a stroke at his home in Oshkosh, Wisconsin.

Wisconsin State Assembly
Preceded by Andrew Haben	Member of the Wisconsin State Assembly from the Winnebago 1st district January 1, 1883 – January 5, 1885	Succeeded by Andrew Haben
Preceded by Franklin L. Gilson	Speaker of the Wisconsin State Assembly; January 10, 1883 – January 5, 1885	Succeeded by Hiram Orlando Fairchild
