= William Robinson (Wisconsin politician) =

American politician

William Robinson (February 27, 1825 – September 15, 1895) was a member of the Wisconsin State Assembly.

== Biography ==
Robinson was born on February 27, 1825, in Northwich, England. He settled in Moscow, Wisconsin. During the American Civil War, he was drafted into the Union Army, serving in the 22nd Wisconsin Infantry Regiment. He died in Hollandale, Wisconsin, on September 15, 1895.

== Assembly career ==
Robinson was elected to the Assembly in 1872 and 1873. He was a Republican.
