= Shamrock, Wisconsin =

- Unincorporated community
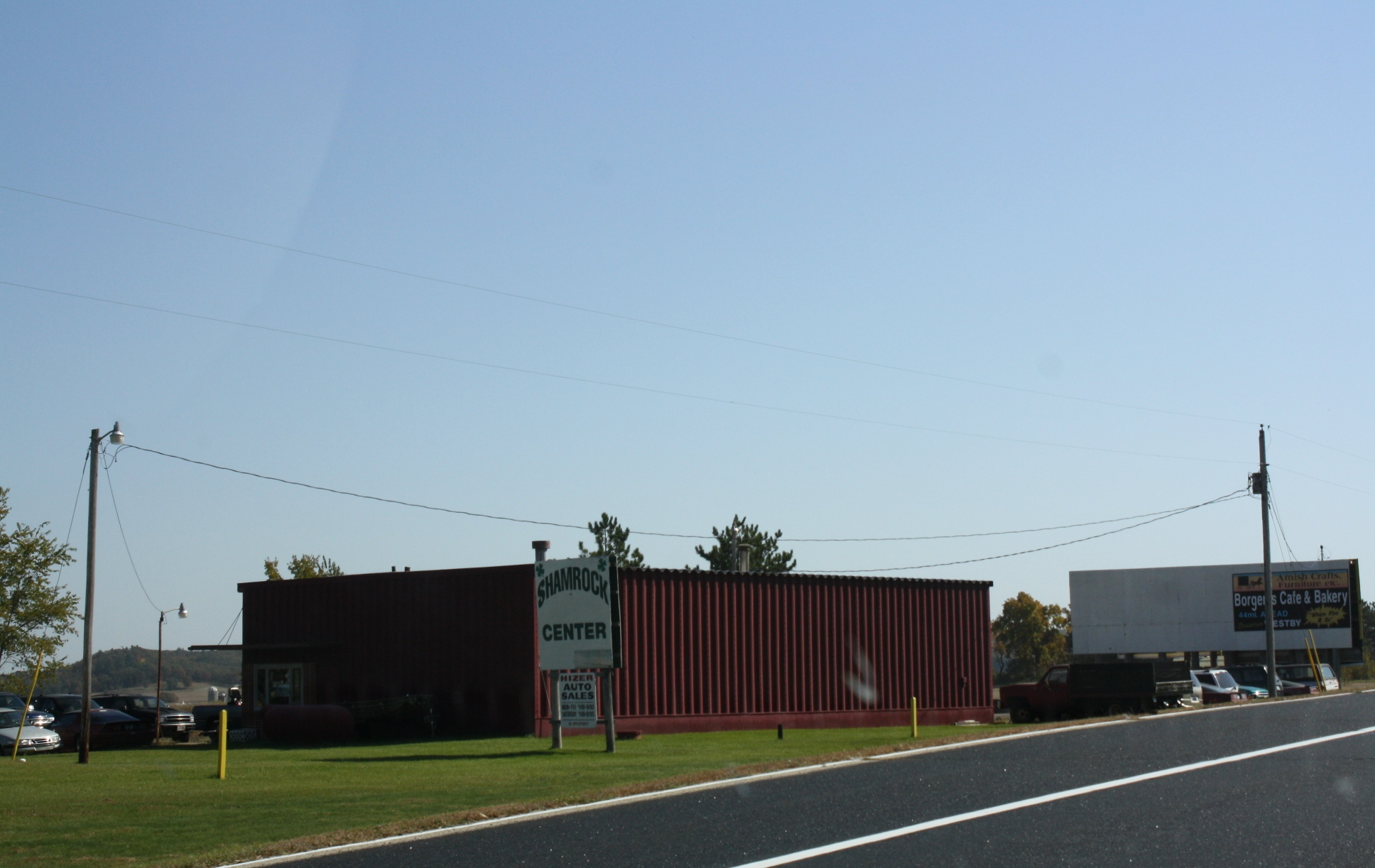
- Looking north in downtown Shamrock

- Location within Wisconsin Location within the United States
- Coordinates: 44°10′27″N 90°48′16″W
- Country: United States
- State: Wisconsin
- County: Jackson
- Town: Manchester
- Elevation: 840 ft (260 m)
- Time zone: UTC-6 (Central (CST))
  - Summer (DST): UTC-5 (CDT)
- Area codes: 715 & 534
- GNIS feature ID: 1573955

Shamrock is an unincorporated community located in the town of Manchester, Jackson County, Wisconsin, United States. Shamrock is located along Wisconsin Highway 27, 8.5 miles (13.7 km) south-southeast of Black River Falls.

== Images ==
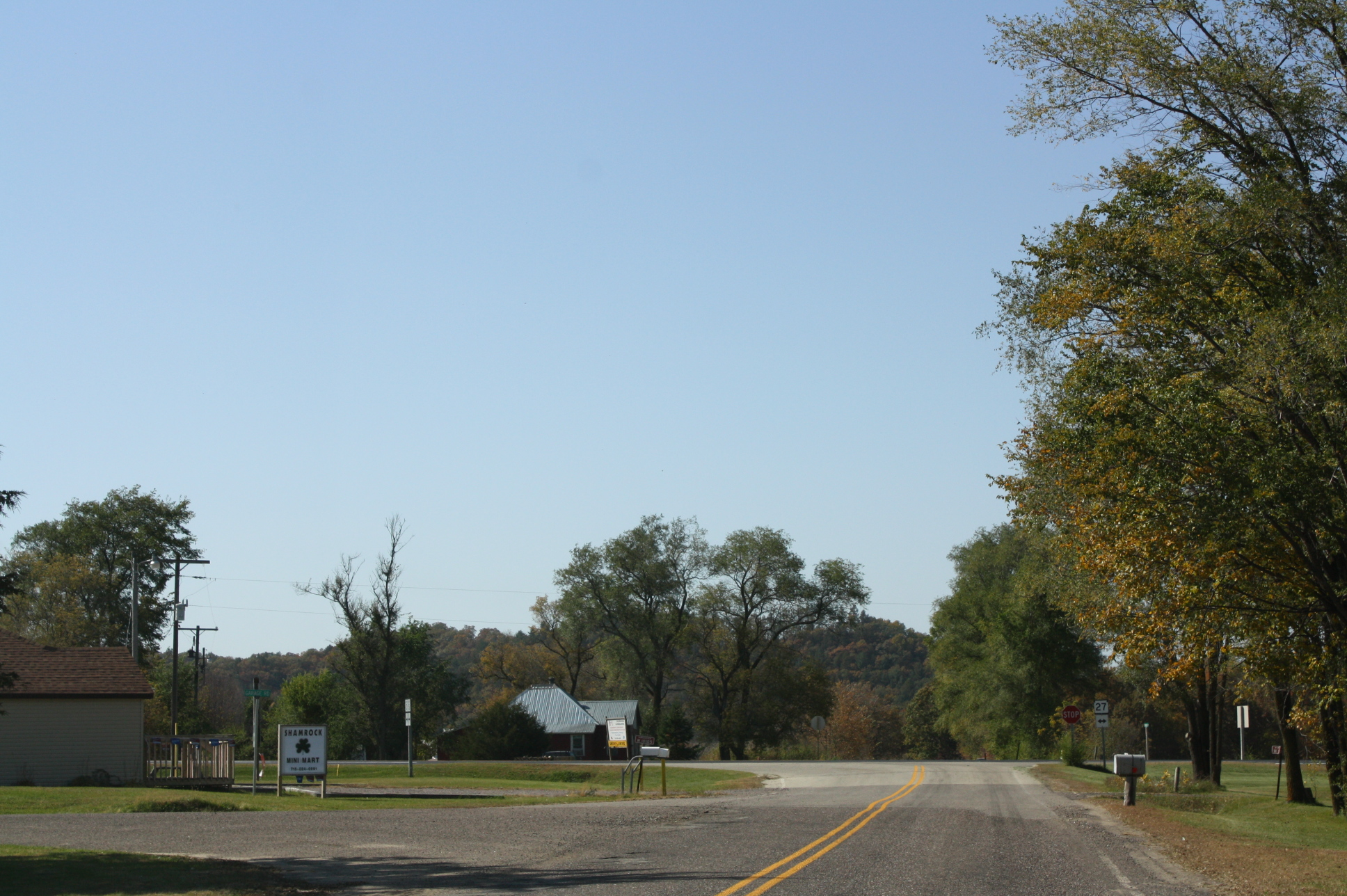
Looking west in downtown Shamrock
