= Leander F. Frisby =

19th century American lawyer, 13th Attorney General of Wisconsin

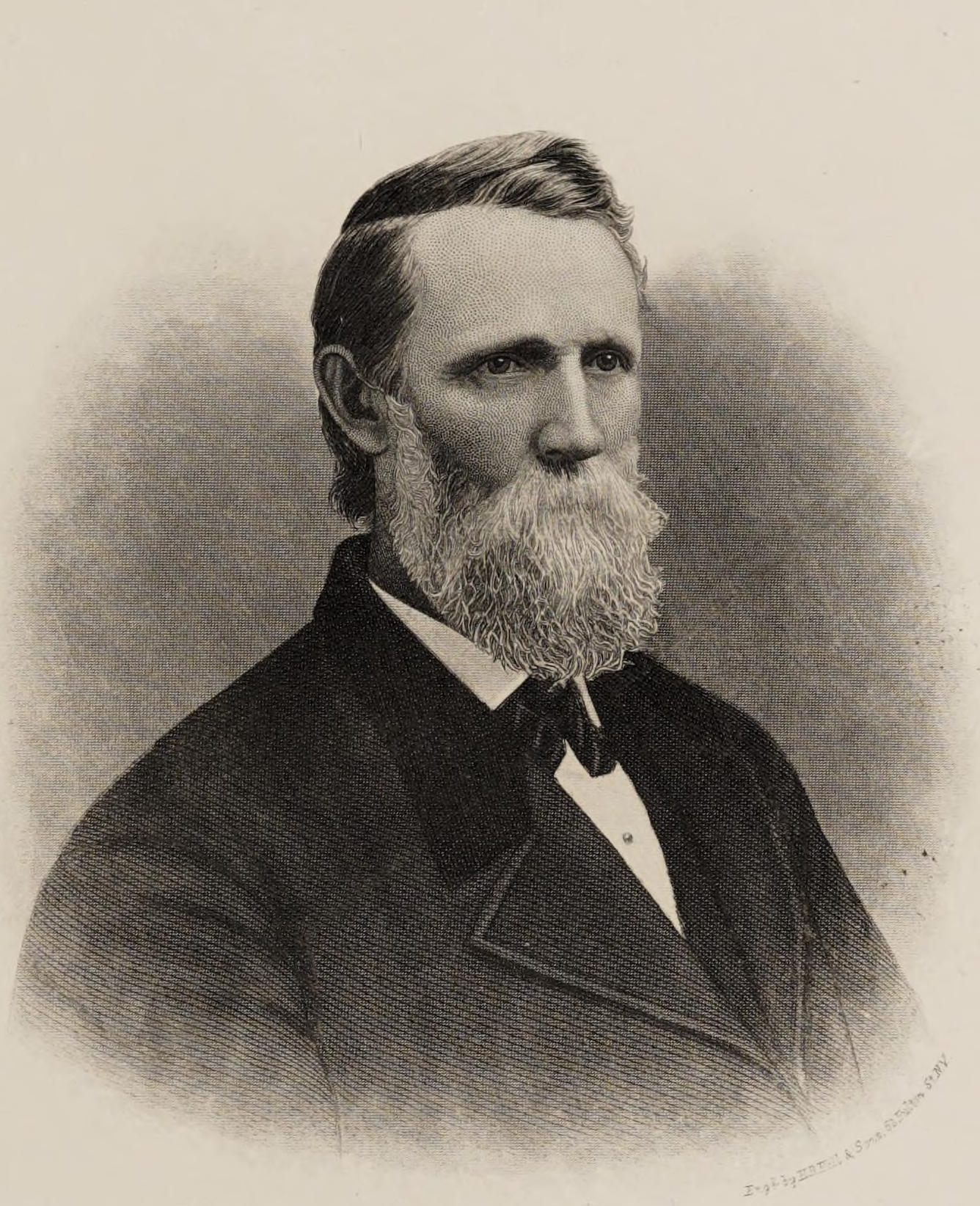

13th Attorney General of Wisconsin
- In office January 2, 1882 – January 3, 1887
- Governor: Jeremiah McLain Rusk
- Preceded by: Alexander Wilson
- Succeeded by: Charles E. Estabrook

Member of the Wisconsin State Assembly from the Washington 2nd district
- In office January 1, 1861 – January 1, 1862
- Preceded by: Matthias Altenhofen
- Succeeded by: Michael Maloy

Village President of West Bend
- In office 1876–1877
- Preceded by: Eckstein
- Succeeded by: Fred H. Haase

Personal details
- Born: Leander Franklin Frisby; June 19, 1825 Mesopotamia, Ohio
- Died: April 19, 1889 (aged 63)
- Resting place: Forest Home Cemetery; Milwaukee, Wisconsin
- Party: Republican
- Spouses: Frances E. Rooker; (m. 1854; died 1902)
- Children: Alice Frances Frisby^{(b. 1856; died 1883)}; Almah Jane Frisby^{(b. 1857; died 1931)}; Marion Clark Frisby^{(b. 1860; died 1883)}; Leander F. Frisby Jr.^{(b. 1862; died 1938)}; Ralph Eugene Frisby^{(b. 1865; died 1883)}
- Parents: Lucius Frisby (father); Lovina (Gary) Frisby (mother)
- Relatives: Franklin L. Gilson (nephew)

Leander Franklin Frisby (June 19, 1825 – April 19, 1889) was an American lawyer, Republican politician, and Wisconsin pioneer. He was the 13th Attorney General of Wisconsin (1882–1887) and served in the Wisconsin State Assembly, representing Washington County.

== Biography ==
Born in Mesopotamia Township, Trumbull County, Ohio, Frisby moved to Burlington, Wisconsin Territory, in 1846, where he taught school. In 1850, Frisby was admitted to the Wisconsin bar and moved to West Bend, Wisconsin. Frisby was the first district attorney of Washington County, Wisconsin. He was active in the Free Soil Party and then the Republican Party after 1854. In 1861, he served in the Wisconsin State Assembly. Frisby served as Wisconsin Attorney General from 1882 to 1887. Beginning in 1883, he practiced law with his nephew, Franklin L. Gilson.

His daughter Almah Jane Frisby was a physician and university professor. She was the first woman appointed to the University of Wisconsin Board of Regents, and to the Wisconsin Board of Control.

== Notes ==
Party political offices
Preceded by Stephen Steele Barlow	Republican nominee for Attorney General of Wisconsin; 1873	Succeeded by John R. Bennett
Preceded by Alexander Wilson	Republican nominee for Attorney General of Wisconsin; 1881, 1884	Succeeded by Charles E. Estabrook
Legal offices
Preceded by Alexander Wilson	Attorney General of Wisconsin; 1882 – 1887	Succeeded by Charles E. Estabrook
