= William A. Jones (politician) =

American politician

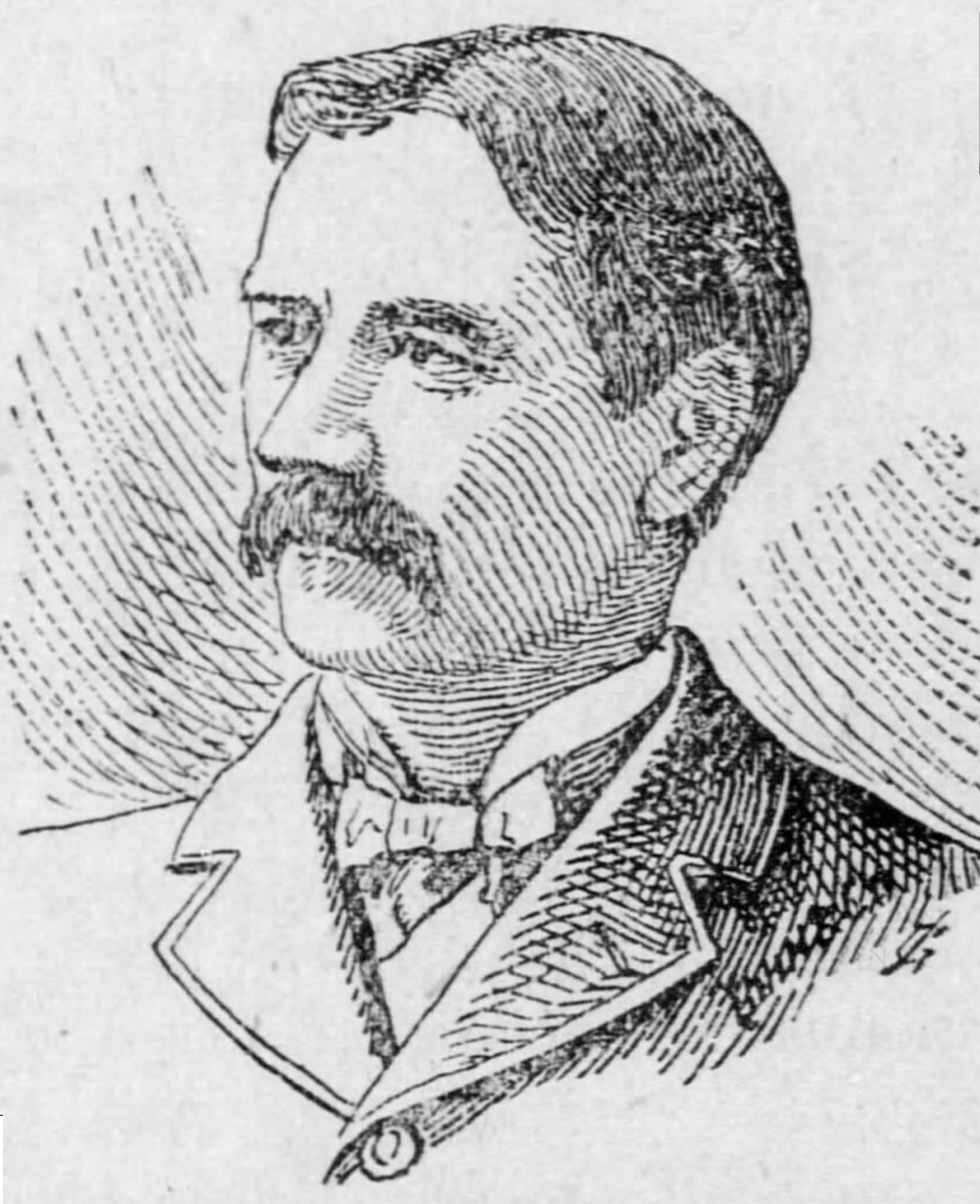
- Likeness from The Watertown News (Apr. 24, 1895)

27th Commissioner of Indian Affairs
- In office May 3, 1897 – December 31, 1904
- President: William McKinley; Theodore Roosevelt
- Preceded by: Daniel M. Browning
- Succeeded by: Francis E. Leupp

Member of the Wisconsin State Assembly from the Iowa district
- In office January 7, 1895 – April 1897
- Preceded by: John Montgomery Smith
- Succeeded by: Bjorn Holland

22nd Mayor of Mineral Point, Wisconsin
- In office April 1884 – April 1885
- Preceded by: Thomas Priestley
- Succeeded by: John Montgomery Smith

Personal details
- Born: September 7, 1844 Pembrokeshire, Wales
- Died: September 17, 1912 (aged 68) Mineral Point, Wisconsin, U.S.
- Resting place: Graceland Cemetery, Mineral Point
- Party: Republican
- Spouse: Sarah Cleary Ansley (m. 1881–1912)
- Children: William Ansley Jones^{(b. 1883; died 1962)}; Florence (Ansley)^{(b. 1889; died 1985)}; Agnes and Marion
- Education: Platteville State Normal School
- Occupation: farmer

William Arthur Jones (September 7, 1844 – September 17, 1912) was a Welsh American immigrant, educator, businessman, and Republican politician. He was the 27th Commissioner of Indian Affairs, serving in the administration of U.S. President William McKinley. Earlier, he was mayor of Mineral Point, Wisconsin, and represented Iowa County for two terms in the Wisconsin State Assembly.

== Biography ==
Jones was born on September 7, 1844, in South Wales. He moved to Iowa County, Wisconsin, in 1851 and settled in a Welsh immigrant community near Mineral Point. He was educated in the common schools there, then graduated from the Platteville State Normal School—now the University of Wisconsin-Platteville.

He went on to become principal of the Mineral Point high school and was elected to two terms as county superintendent of schools, serving from 1877 to 1881.

He became involved in a banking interest with Alex Wilson, known as Wilson & Jones in 1881, and one of the founders of the Mineral Point Zinc Company in 1882. He remained associated with the Zinc Company until his death. He subsequently became cashier and vice president of the First National Bank of Mineral Point, and was associated with the bank until 1897.

During this time, he was also active with the Republican Party of Wisconsin and was elected mayor and municipal judge of Mineral Point in the April 1884 election. He was elected to the Wisconsin State Assembly on the Republican ticket in 1894 and 1896. After the conclusion of the regular session of the 1897 session, he was appointed commissioner of Indian Affairs by newly-inaugurated U.S. President William McKinley.

Jones served as commissioner through McKinley's assassination in 1901, and continued as commissioner under McKinley's successor, Theodore Roosevelt. Jones resigned in July 1904 due to clashes over personnel with the Secretary of the Interior, Ethan A. Hitchcock, but continued in the office until the end of the year.

After returning to Wisconsin, Jones was general manager of the Mineral Point & Northern Railway, and later was president of the company.

He died at his home in Mineral Point on September 17, 1912.

== Personal life and family ==
William A. Jones had at least two brothers. He married Sarah Ansley on October 22, 1881. He was survived by his wife and four children.

== Electoral history ==
=== Wisconsin Assembly (1894, 1896) ===
Wisconsin Assembly, Iowa District Election, 1894
Party	Candidate	Votes	%	±%
General Election, November 6, 1894
Republican	William A. Jones	2,829	54.71%	+9.15%
Democratic	A. J. Doran	1,925	37.23%	−10.23%
Prohibition	George E. Plant	324	6.27%	−0.72%
Populist	Harvey Cushman	93	1.80%	
Plurality		904	17.48%	+15.59%
Total votes		5,171	100.0%	+4.07%
Republican gain from Democratic				

Wisconsin Assembly, Iowa District Election, 1896
Party	Candidate	Votes	%	±%
General Election, November 3, 1896
Republican	William A. Jones (incumbent)	3,263	61.21%	+6.50%
Democratic	John Montgomery Smith	2,067	38.77%	+1.55%
Independent	N. H. Snow (write-in)	1	0.02%	
Plurality		1,196	22.43%	+4.95%
Total votes		5,331	100.0%	+3.09%
Republican hold				

Wisconsin State Assembly
Preceded by John Montgomery Smith	Member of the Wisconsin State Assembly from the Iowa district January 7, 1895 – April 1897	Succeeded by Bjorn Holland
Political offices
Preceded by Thomas Priestley	Mayor of Mineral Point, Wisconsin; April 1884 – April 1885	Succeeded by John Montgomery Smith
Government offices
Preceded by Daniel M. Browning	Commissioner of Indian Affairs; May 3, 1897 – December 31, 1904	Succeeded by Francis E. Leupp
