= Mascouten =

Ethnic group

Total population
- descendants are part of the Kickapoo today

Regions with significant populations
- Michigan, Wisconsin and Illinois

Languages
- Algonquian

Religion
- traditional tribal religion

Related ethnic groups
- Piankeshaw and Kickapoo

The Mascouten (also Mascoutin, Mathkoutench, Muscoden, or Musketoon) were a tribe of Algonquian-speaking Native Americans located in the Midwest. They are believed to have dwelt on both sides of the Mississippi River, adjacent to the present-day Wisconsin-Illinois border, after being driven out of Michigan by the Odawa.

== Identification ==
The accounts of the Jesuit Relations frequently refer to the Mascouten as the "Fire Nation" or "Nation of Fire". One Jesuit wrote, "The Fire Nation is erroneously so called, its correct name being Maskoutench, which means 'a treeless country,' like that inhabited by these people; but as, by changing a few letters, this Word is made to signify 'fire,' therefore the people have come to be called the Fire Nation."

Their name apparently comes either from a Fox word meaning "Little Prairie People" or from the Sauk term Mashkotêwi ("Prairie") or Mashkotêwineniwa ("Plains Indians") and shkotêwi ("fire") which would fit the Jesuit’s statement. The Mascouten may have also been the Mush-co-desh, or Little Prairie People, referred to by Odawa historian, Andrew Blackbird. In the 17th century, Blackbird wrote, the Mush-co-desh occupied northern lower Michigan, but were massacred by the Odawa. Blackbird said that the Odawa, under the leadership of Saw-ge-maw, killed 40 to 50 thousand of them and drove the survivors south towards Indiana. Historians do not know what they called themselves (autonym). The Wendat knew them also as Atsistaeronnon ("people of the fire").

== History ==
They are first mentioned in historic records by French missionaries, who described the people as inhabiting the southern area of present-day Michigan. The missionaries reported the Mascouten as being more populous than all the Neutral, the Wendat, and the Haudenosaunee Nations put together. In 1712, the Mascouten united with the Kickapoo and the Meskwaki, after almost being exterminated by the French and the Potawatomi.

The survivors migrated westward. The Mascouten are last referred to as a band in historic records in 1779, when they were living on the Wabash River (in present-day Indiana) with peoples of the Piankeshaw and the Kickapoo. The surviving Mascouten are noted in United States records of 1813 and 1825 as being part of the Kickapoo Prairie Band.

The city of Mascoutah, Illinois, was named in 1839 after the Mascouten tribe.

The village of Moscow, Iowa County, Wisconsin, is said to have been named after the Mascouten tribe.
