= Bjorn Holland =

American politician (1841–1930)

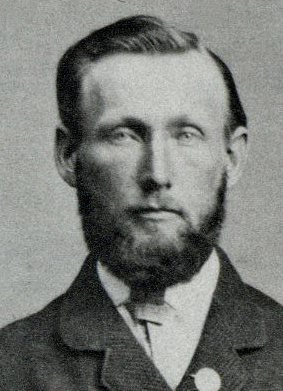

Member of the Wisconsin State Assembly from the Iowa district
- In office January 1899 – January 1903
- Preceded by: William A. Jones

Personal details
- Born: July 5, 1841 Rogaland, Sweden–Norway
- Died: April 7, 1930 (aged 88) Blanchardville, WI, United States
- Party: Republican
- Children: 7

Bjorn Sjursson Holland (July 5, 1841 – April 7, 1930) was a Norwegian American immigrant, farmer, merchant, teacher, and politician.

Also known as "Ben Holland," he was born July 5, 1841, in Rogaland, Norway. In 1846, his family emigrated to the United States and settled in the town of La Grange, Walworth County, Wisconsin Territory. The family soon moved to York, Green County, followed by Primrose, Dane County. Holland worked on neighboring farms and went to district schools before attending Albion Academy in Dane County, Wisconsin from 1861 to 1863. Following his studies, he was a teacher and a principal in a private school in Chicago, Illinois in 1865, 1867, 1871, and 1879. Between that position, he conducted a milling and merchandise business with his brothers in the villages of Moscow and Adamsville in Iowa County, Wisconsin, and served as town clerk of Moscow Township in 1867. In 1882, he purchased a farm upon which the Illinois Central Railroad soon built a line. A depot was established on his property and the village that grew, Hollandle, was named for him. He continued to work as a merchant, farmer, and cattle dealer here for more than 30 years. As a Republican, Bjorn Holland was elected to the Wisconsin Assembly, serving from 1899 to 1903. He died at his home in Blanchardville, Wisconsin after being in poor health. He outlived all seven of his children and left no known descendants.
