= Alexander Wilson (Wisconsin politician) =

American politician (1833–1888)

12th Attorney General of Wisconsin
- In office January 7, 1878 – January 2, 1882
- Governor: William E. Smith; Jeremiah McLain Rusk
- Preceded by: A. Scott Sloan
- Succeeded by: Leander F. Frisby

County Judge of Iowa County, Wisconsin
- In office December 9, 1867 – January 3, 1870
- Appointed by: Lucius Fairchild
- Preceded by: Luman M. Strong
- Succeeded by: Robert Wilson

District Attorney of Iowa County, Wisconsin
- In office January 2, 1865 – December 9, 1867
- Preceded by: Joseph H. Clary
- Succeeded by: E. P. Weber
- In office January 7, 1861 – January 5, 1863
- Preceded by: Joseph H. Clary
- Succeeded by: Joseph H. Clary

Personal details
- Born: August 16, 1833 Westfield, New York, U.S.
- Died: March 4, 1888 (aged 54) Lincoln, Nebraska, U.S.
- Resting place: Wyuka Cemetery, Lincoln, Nebraska
- Party: Republican

Alexander Wilson (August 16, 1833 – March 4, 1888) was an American lawyer and Republican politician. He was the 12th Attorney General of Wisconsin, serving from 1878 through 1882, and served several years as a district attorney and county judge in Iowa County, Wisconsin.

== Biography ==
Born in Westfield, New York, Wilson graduated from Union College in 1854, studying the science and civil engineering course. He taught school for two winters at Huntley, Illinois, then moved to Dubuque, Iowa, where he read law and worked as a land surveyor. He was admitted to the bar in the Fall of 1855, and moved to Wisconsin later that year.

He settled at Mineral Point, Wisconsin, in Iowa County, and worked for several years as a teacher, served on the board of education, and was elected city superintendent of schools. While teaching, he read law in the offices of Cobb & Messmore. In 1860, he began his own law practice in partnership with E. P. Weber. He was elected district attorney at the fall 1860 general election and was elected to the office again in 1864 and 1866. In December 1867, he was appointed county judge of Iowa County, replacing Luman M. Strong, who died in office.

In 1874, he established a private bank in partnership with Edward Harris. The bank later developed into the City Bank of Mineral Point.

He was elected Attorney General of Wisconsin in the general election of 1877 and was re-elected in 1879. The Wisconsin Bar Association described Wilson as conservative, patient, and safe.

After leaving office in 1882, Wilson returned to his private law practice. He died in March 1888 in Lincoln, Nebraska, while en route to California. He is buried in Wyuka Cemetery in Lincoln.

== Electoral history ==
Wisconsin Attorney General Election, 1877
Party	Candidate	Votes	%	±%
General Election, November 6, 1877
Republican	Alexander Wilson	77,304	44.25%	−5.22%
Democratic	Joseph M. Morrow	72,300	41.39%	
Greenback	Henry Hayden	25,090	14.36%	
Plurality		5,004	2.86%	+1.80%
Total votes		174,694	100.0%	+2.96%
Republican gain from Liberal Republican				

Wisconsin Attorney General Election, 1879
Party	Candidate	Votes	%	±%
General Election, November 4, 1879
Republican	Alexander Wilson (incumbent)	100,562	53.43%	+9.17%
Democratic	J. Montgomery Smith	74,821	39.75%	−1.64%
Greenback	Edward Q. Nye	12,846	6.82%	−7.54%
Plurality		25,741	13.68%	+10.81%
Total votes		188,229	100.0%	+7.75%
Republican hold				

Party political offices
Preceded by John R. Bennett	Republican nominee for Attorney General of Wisconsin; 1877, 1879	Succeeded by Leander F. Frisby
Legal offices
Preceded by Joseph H. Clary	District Attorney of Iowa County, Wisconsin; January 7, 1861 – January 5, 1863	Succeeded by Joseph H. Clary
Preceded by Joseph H. Clary	District Attorney of Iowa County, Wisconsin; January 2, 1865 – December 9, 1867	Succeeded by E. P. Weber
Preceded by Luman M. Strong	County Judge of Iowa County, Wisconsin; December 9, 1867 – January 3, 1870	Succeeded by Robert Wilson
Preceded by A. Scott Sloan	Attorney General of Wisconsin; January 7, 1878 – January 2, 1882	Succeeded by Leander F. Frisby
