= Franklin L. Gilson =

19th century American lawyer and judge, 32nd Speaker of the Wisconsin Assembly

The Honorable Franklin L. Gilson
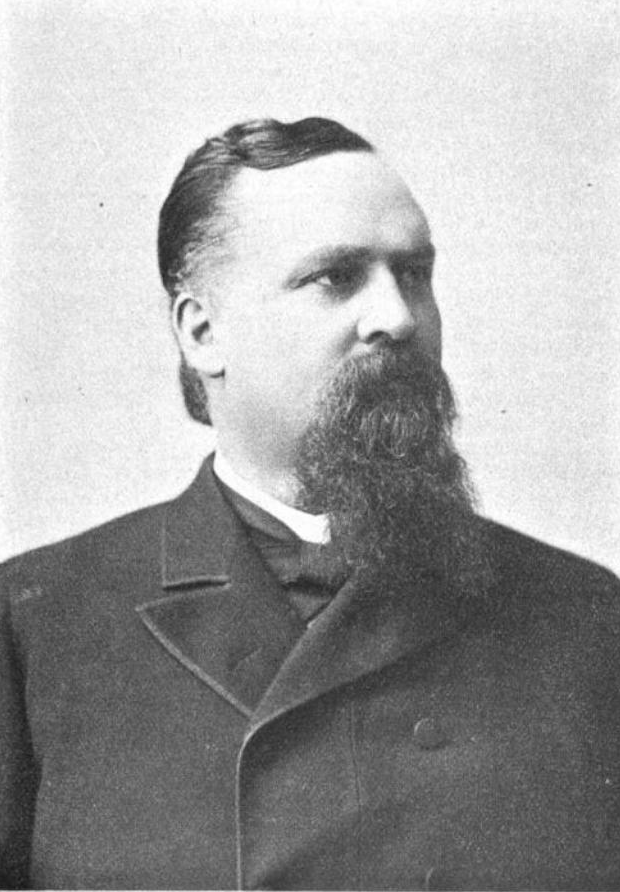

Judge of the Milwaukee Superior Court Branch 1
- In office 1890 – June 14, 1892
- Appointed by: William D. Hoard
- Preceded by: George H. Noyes
- Succeeded by: John C. Ludwig

32nd Speaker of the Wisconsin Assembly
- In office January 11, 1882 – January 10, 1883
- Preceded by: Ira B. Bradford
- Succeeded by: Earl Finch

Member of the Wisconsin State Assembly from the Pierce district
- In office January 3, 1881 – January 1, 1883
- Preceded by: Nils P. Haugen
- Succeeded by: John Day Putnam

District Attorney for Pierce County
- In office January 1, 1875 – January 3, 1881
- Preceded by: Edward H. Ives
- Succeeded by: F. A. Ross

Personal details
- Born: Franklin Leander Gilson; October 22, 1846 Middlefield, Ohio
- Died: June 7, 1892 (aged 45) Milwaukee, Wisconsin
- Cause of death: Heart attack
- Resting place: Forest Home Cemetery; Milwaukee, Wisconsin
- Party: Republican
- Parents: Willard H. Gilson (father); Sylvia Lavina (Frisby) Gilson (mother)
- Profession: lawyer, judge

Franklin Leander Gilson (October 22, 1846 – June 7, 1892) was an American politician and jurist. He was the 32nd Speaker of the Wisconsin State Assembly, and for the last two years of his life, he was judge of the Milwaukee Superior Court. Earlier in his career, he served as district attorney for Pierce County for six years. he died of a heart attack on June 7, 1892 at age 45

== Biography ==
Born in Middlefield, Ohio, Gilson studied at Hiram College and Oberlin College, but did not graduate. In 1870, he moved to West Bend, Wisconsin, in Washington County, and studied law with his uncle Leander F. Frisby. In 1872, Gilson was admitted to the State Bar of Wisconsin and practiced law in Ellsworth, Wisconsin, in far west Pierce County.

Gilson served as district attorney of Pierce County, Wisconsin, from 1875 to 1881. A member of the Republican Party, Gilson was a delegate for Wisconsin to the 1880 Republican National Convention. That same year, he was elected to represent Pierce County in the Wisconsin Assembly. He was re-elected in 1881, and in the 1882 session, he was chosen by his caucus as Speaker of the Assembly.

In 1883, Gilson moved to Milwaukee, Wisconsin, to practice law with his uncle Leander Frisby. In 1890, Gilson was appointed judge of Milwaukee Superior Court serving until his death in 1892.

== Notes ==
Political offices
Preceded by Ira B. Bradford	Speaker of the Wisconsin State Assembly; 1882 – 1883	Succeeded by Earl Finch
Legal offices
Preceded by Edward H. Ives	District Attorney for Pierce County, Wisconsin; 1875 – 1881	Succeeded by F. A. Ross
Preceded by George H. Noyes	Judge of the Milwaukee Superior Court Branch 1; 1890 – 1892	Succeeded by John C. Ludwig
